= Television in Spain =

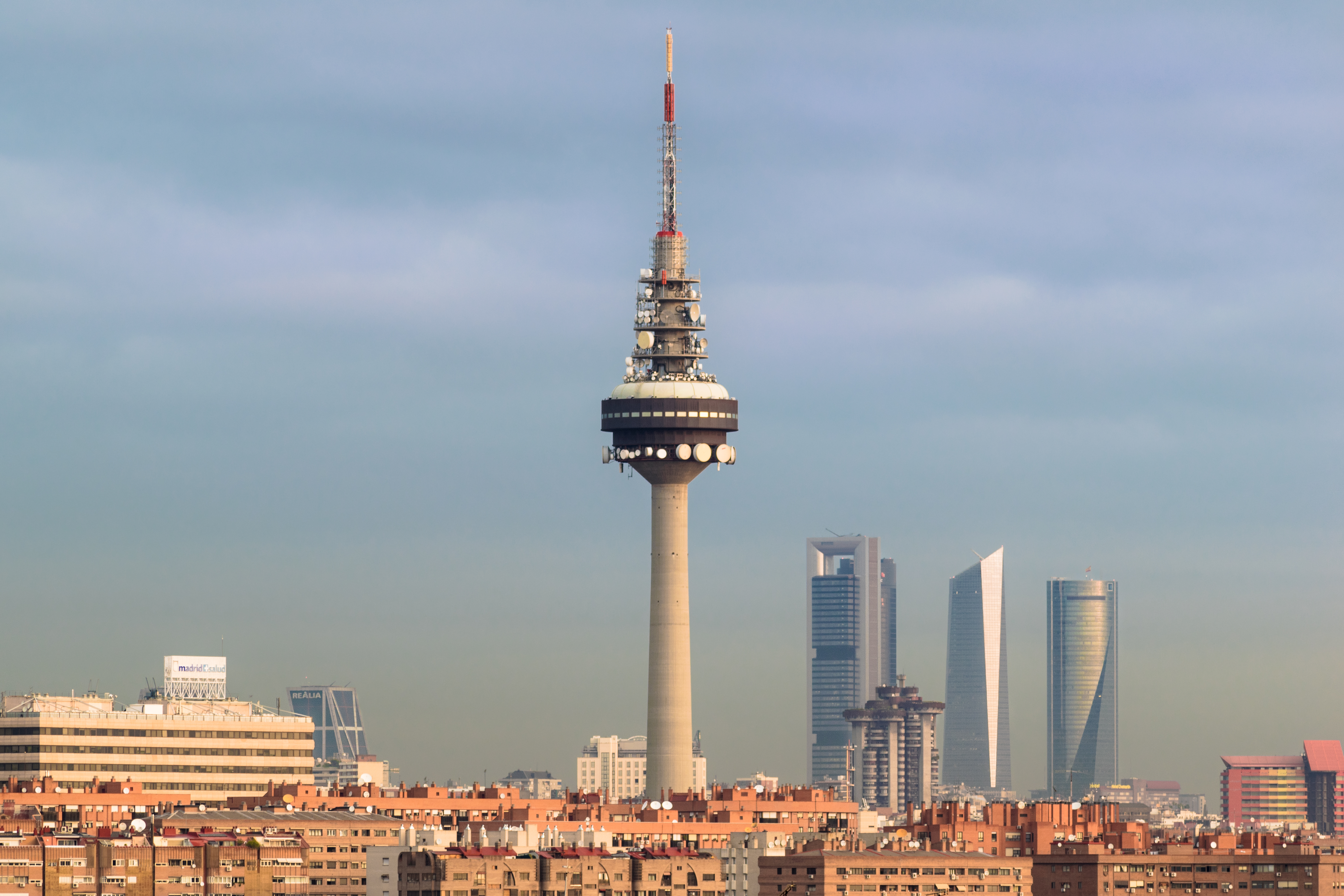
Torrespaña, located in Madrid, is the central and main transmission node of the terrestrial television and radio networks in the country.

Television in Spain was introduced in 1956, when the national state-owned public service television broadcaster Televisión Española (TVE) started regular analog free-to-air terrestrial black and white broadcasts. Colour transmissions started in 1972 after two years of test transmissions, with all programming transmitted in color in 1977, and colour commercials starting in 1978. TVE held a monopoly on television broadcasting until regional public channels were launched during the 1980s and commercial television started nationwide in 1990. Digital terrestrial television was launched on 30 November 2005 with analog service discontinued on 3 April 2010. Currently, television is one of the leading mass media of the country, and by 2008 was in 99.7% of households in Spain according to INE statistics.

Until recently terrestrial television was considered an essential public service. Broadcasting is managed both directly by the State and indirectly, through controlled concessions to private companies. The Audiovisual Law of 2010 changed this by defining radio and television as commercial services that individuals pay for, fostering liberalization within some constraints.

== History ==
=== Early broadcasts ===
Although television in Spain did not commence regular broadcasts until the 1950s, certain transmissions had taken place a couple of decades earlier. In 1932, engineer Vicente Guiñau received several foreign television signals in Barcelona using a television set acquired in England. In 1934, the first telecommunications graduate in Spain, Joaquín Sánchez Cordovés, conducted several public broadcasts from the Sala Werner in Barcelona with equipment he had constructed himself. After the Spanish Civil War, during the 1948 Fira de Barcelona, Dutch company Philips simultaneously retransmitted the signal received from a nearby studio where various performers and singers were appearing. That same year, using the same technology, a bullfight was broadcast from the Vista Alegre bullring in Madrid.

=== 1950s ===
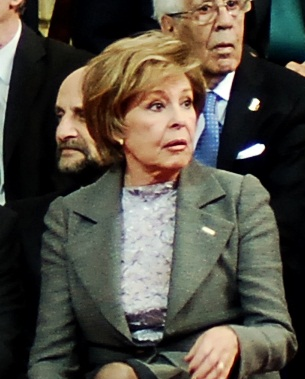
Laura Valenzuela was the first female TV presenter in Spain

Between 1 November 1950 and the spring of 1952, the first experimental broadcasts were carried out in a laboratory of Radio Nacional de España (RNE) at Paseo de La Habana in Madrid; these transmissions were received by only fifteen television sets in the city. Starting in October 1952, test broadcasts were established under the auspices of RNE, and were therefore referred to as ‘Televisión de Radio Nacional de España'.

Initially, programs were occasional and produced on commission once a week. On 13 February 1953, broadcasts began to air twice a week for a couple of hours. During this period, the first television broadcast of a Spanish football match took place, featuring a game between Real Madrid and Racing de Santander on 24 October 1954. Broadcasts progressively grew in both duration and variety until the summer of 1955, at which point they were suspended to allow for the installation of more advanced equipment, in anticipation of the launch of Televisión Española.

Televisión Española officially began broadcasting on 28 October 1956 at 6:15 p.m. CET, from the modest studios at Paseo de La Habana in Madrid. TVE launched its programming to approximately 600 television sets, all located in Madrid. During its first months, daily broadcasts did not exceed three hours, reaching four hours in 1957. Programming was transmitted mostly live. The news service was renamed Telediario on 15 September 1957. The remainder of the programming was devoted to variety shows, including comedy, drama, televised theater, and even some foreign films, mainly from the United States.

On 15 February 1959, Televisión Española began broadcasting in Barcelona, coinciding with the transmission of a football match between Real Madrid and FC Barcelona. A few months later, on 14 July 1959, the Miramar Studios were inaugurated in the city.

=== 1960s ===
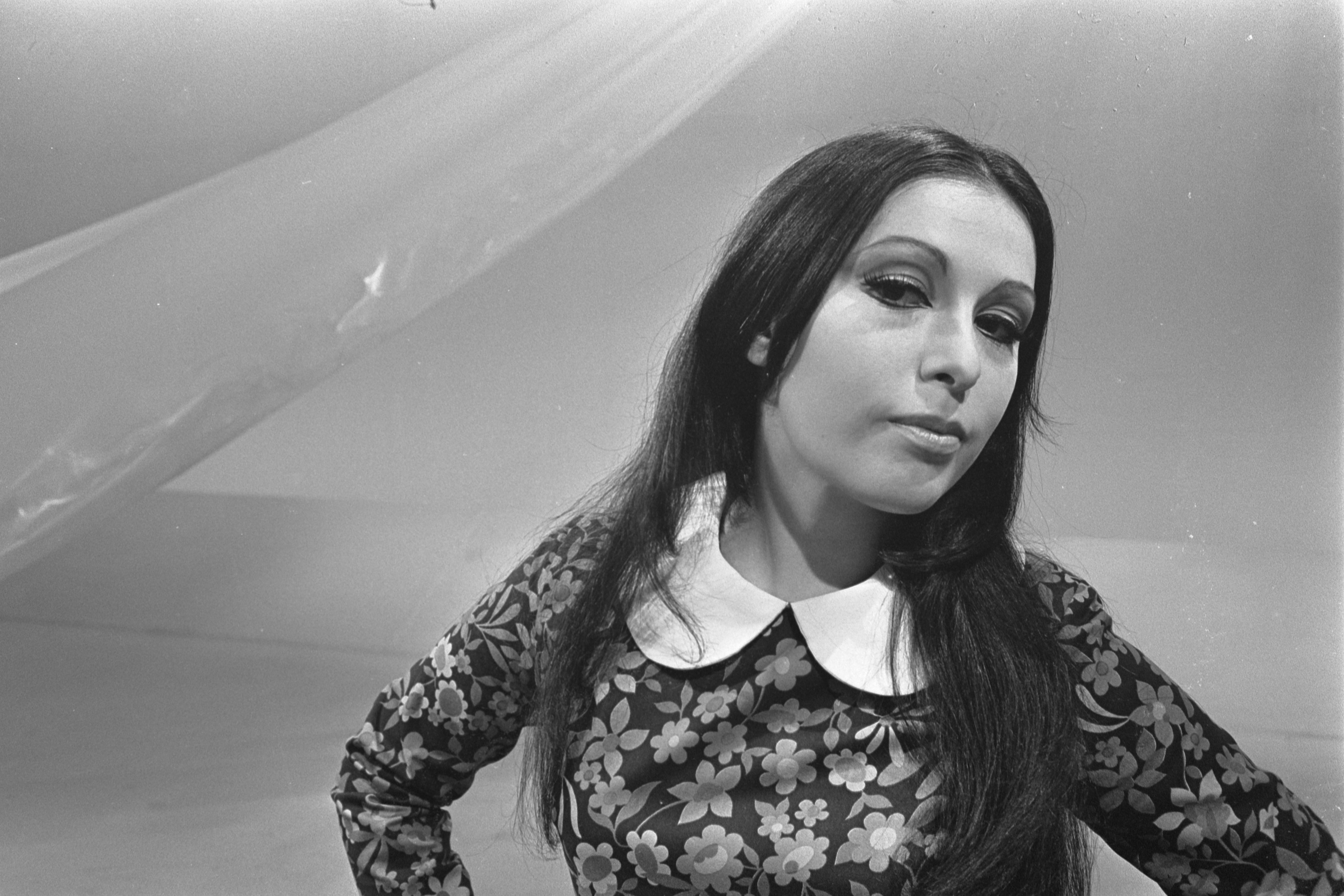
Massiel's victory at the 1968 Eurovision Song Contest resulted in TVE hosting the festival the subsequent year, which led to investments in equipment for conducting color transmissions.

On 15 December 1960, the wedding of Baudouin of Belgium and Fabiola de Mora y Aragón marked the first time that TVE broadcast live content produced by a foreign country, demonstrating its integration into the European Broadcasting Union. The Prado del Rey Studios were officially inaugurated on 18 July 1964 to replace the Paseo de la Habana headquarters in Madrid, with the new studios being nearly three times larger than the original ones.

During this decade, TVE expanded its broadcasts to the rest of peninsular Spain. TVE also launched two regional channels that operated autonomously by its territorial production centers as they had no television link with peninsular Spain: TVE Canarias was launched on 12 February 1964 in the Canary Islands, and operated autonomously until 25 April 1971 when connected to the main channel; and TVE Guinea was launched on 20 July 1968 in the autonomous region of Equatorial Guinea, and closed shortly after the country declared independence on 12 October 1968.

On 1 January 1965, test broadcasts began for TVE’s second channel, La 2, which officially launched on 15 November 1966. Named UHF at the time, it was a channel with a smaller audience, focused on areas such as culture, sports, and music.

The first color broadcast took place during the 1969 Eurovision Song Contest, held in Madrid following Spain’s victory the previous year. Nevertheless, the majority of Spain’s television sets at the time, still fairly limited in number, lacked the capability to receive color broadcasts.

=== 1970s ===
TVE started regular colour transmissions in 1972 after over two years of test transmissions, with all programming transmitted in color in 1977, and colour commercials starting in 1978.

=== 1980s ===
These were the only authorized television channels in Spain, as TVE held a monopoly on television broadcasting, until the first regional public television channel was launched on 16 February 1983, when Euskal Telebista started broadcasting in the Basque Country. It was followed on 11 September 1983 by TV3 in Catalonia, on 24 July 1985 by Televisión de Galicia (TVG) in Galicia, on 28 February 1989 by Canal Sur in Andalusia, on 2 May 1989 by Telemadrid in Madrid and on 9 October 1989 by Canal Nou in the Valencian Community. The full liberalization of television with the law of 1989 permitted the establishment of private commercial channels.

=== 1990s ===
Commercial television was launched on 25 January 1990, when Antena 3 started broadcasting nationwide. It was followed by Telecinco on 3 March 1990 and Canal+ on 14 September 1990. Both Antena 3 and Telecinco were free-to-air analog terrestrial channels while Canal+ was a pay analog terrestrial channel obliged to broadcast six free-to-air hours a day. Sogecable's pay analog satellite multichannel television provider Canal Satélite was launched on 1 January 1994. Two pay digital satellite multichannel television providers were launched in 1997, Canal Satélite Digital on 31 January (controlled by PRISA) and Vía Digital on 15 September (controlled by Telefónica, TVE Temática, Televisa and minority shareholders), only to merge six years later, on 21 July 2003, to form Digital+, renamed Canal+ on 17 October 2011 after its flagship channel.

Through the 1990s and 2000s, more regional channels (most of them public, but some of them private) were launched. A number of them created FORTA, a union of public regional broadcasters. Many local channels were also launched, some of them created the Localia Network. During the 1990s, dozens of local channels started broadcasting without a license. The government declared that channels that proved to be operating for a long time could go on working, but blocked new unlicensed channels.

=== 2000s ===
In the 2000s, the analog national and autonomic channels started simulcast on digital terrestrial television. In 2005, Canal+ stopped its analog service to move to Digital Plus and was substituted by Cuatro. Some weeks later, the last analog national private channel, La Sexta, started testing broadcasts, to begin its regular analog schedule in 2006. In 2009, the analog service started its closure in a process that lasted one year. The development of digital terrestrial television was very similar to the failure of ITV Digital in the United Kingdom. Digital terrestrial television was introduced in the country by the pay per view platform Quiero Television. In May 2002, statewide operators were required to start broadcasting in DVB-T. Yet, Quiero TV ceased transmissions in 2002 after a commercial failure. Unlike the UK, the three and half multiplexes left by the platform were not reassigned to other operators, and so 5 channels were squashed into a single multiplex.

On 30 November 2005, digital terrestrial television was relaunched as a free service with 20 channels and 14 radio stations, along with 23 regional- and local-language channels in their respective areas. Currently about 95% of the population can receive DTT. Each multiplex has a minimum of 4 SD channels each or one HD channel. Televisió de Catalunya and Aragón Televisión are using spare bandwidth in their own digital multiplex to broadcast test HD streams.

=== 2010s ===
==== Modern free-to-air digital terrestrial television sector ====
Analog service was officially discontinued on 3 April 2010. Since then, all national and regional terrestrial channels are digital. Together with the TDT transition and the process of absorption of channels in the late-2000s to early-2010s amid the Spanish financial crisis, the removal of commercials from RTVE by means of its 2009 Funding Law facilitated the creation of the duopoly formed by Mediaset España and Atresmedia, that secures a 57% share of the audience and a 90% of advertising procurement.

==== 2013 Supreme Court ruling ====
On 28 April 2014, the Supreme Court of Spain ordered the immediate shutdown of 9 of 24 private television stations, considering the Ministry of Industry, then held by the first government of Mariano Rajoy from the People's Party, had not yet enforced a ruling issued on 18 December 2013. The ruling stated that these television channels had been granted their licenses without a public tender in 2010, under the second government of José Luis Rodríguez Zapatero from the Spanish Socialist Workers' Party, despite the requirements of the Audiovisual Communication General Law that came into force a few months prior. As such, the Supreme Court ruled in favor of a company that appealed that decision and declared the license permits null and void. The ruling affected 3 Atresmedia channels (Nitro, Xplora and laSexta 3), 2 from Mediaset España (LaSiete and Nueve), 2 from NET TV (MTV Spain, which remained on cable television, and Intereconomía TV) and 2 from Unidad Editorial (AXN and Marca TV).

A strong campaign was then launched by private companies to prevent the closure of the channels. One of the most controversial cases was that of Mediaset España, which aired a powerful protest spot on all its channels where two of them, personified as part of a family, were run over by a speeding car, ending with the phrase 'They all killed them together.' The ad, which sparked major controversy, removed the hit-and-run scene on May 1.

The channels ceased broadcasting on 6 May 2014, with the Supreme Court arguing that the closure of the channels did not violate freedom of expression.

The Council of Ministers, still under the government of Mariano Rajoy, approved a new public tender to obtain the licenses on 17 April 2015. The tender was resolved on 16 October 2015, granting one HD license to Atresmedia, Mediaset, and Real Madrid each, and one SD license to the Spanish Episcopal Conference, KISS Media (then Radio Blanca), and TEN Media (then Central Broadcaster Media) each.

=== 2020s ===
==== Transition into 4K and DVB-2 ====
The first television channel to fully broadcast in 4K in Spain was La 1 UHD, available on satellite television since 2015. It was followed by Andalusia's Canal Sur 4K on 25 April 2017 and Castile-La Mancha's CMM TV 4K on 11 December 2019. All of them were inaugurated as test-broadcast channels. During these test broadcasts, the channels do not air the regular programming of their respective channels, but instead show their own content prepared in 4K.

UHD Spain was founded on 26 January 2021 as a non-profit association made up of more than 30 major broadcasting companies (both public and private), with their goal being to achieve transition to a fully 4K television using the DVB-T2 standard by 2030. On 11 February 2024, La 1 UHD ended the test broadcasts and started to air La 1’s regular programming in 4K.

Transition to HD finished on 14 February 2024 when all standard-definition versions of generalist channels were shut down and the remaining channels increased their resolution to 1080p.

Since 27 March 2025, all televisions over 40 inches sold in Spain must have a resolution of 4K or higher and be compatible with the DVB-T2 standard. One day later, on 28 March 2025, Galician TVG became the first regional channel to broadcast in 4K on free digital television. Basque channels ETB 1 and ETB 2 started 4K broadcasting on 12 June 2025 via HbbTV.

On 16 October 2025, the third government of Pedro Sánchez approved the public tender for a new television license, the first in 10 years.. Mediaset España and the newly-founded consortium Servicios Integrados de Entretenimiento Televisivo (SIETE) submitted bids, with the license awarded to the latter on 26 May 2026. SIETE officially announced its channel La Séptima on 7 July 2026. That same day, a reorganization of the Digital Terrestrial Television bandwidth will allow Atresmedia and Mediaset to broadcast 4K variants of their main channels. As part of the country’s television frequency realignment, La Séptima will begin broadcasting on 5 November 2026, alongside the launch of Ultra-high-definition versions of generalist channels La 2, Antena 3 and Telecinco.

== Nationwide broadcasters ==
=== Television Española ===

Televisión Española is the national state-owned public television broadcaster and the oldest television service in the country. Founded in 1956, it currently has five channels. It is one of the few state-run broadcasters in the European Union where citizens do not pay a licence fee to fund it, as it is financed through public subsidies and direct taxes on private television and mobile phone operators. As of 2026, it ranks as the third leading audiovisual group in terms of audience, although its flagship channel, La 1, is the second most-watched TV channel. La 1 is also the only nationwide channel broadcast in 4K resolution. Besides its main headquarters in Madrid, RTVE operates two production centers in Catalonia and the Canary Islands. It also offers regional news broadcasts for each of Spain's 17 autonomous communities. José Pablo López serves as Chair of RTVE since 2 December 2024.

Channel	Type	Launch date	Average audience share (2025)
La 1	Generalist	28 October 1956	11.1%
La 2	Generalist	1 January 1965	3.0%
Teledeporte	Sports	12 February 1994	0.6%
24h	Newscast	15 September 1997	1.1%
Clan	Children	12 December 2005	0.8%
TVE Internacional	Generalist	1 December 1989	N/A
RNE Accesible	Generalist	5 November 2026	N/A
Televisión Española		28 October 1956	16.6%

=== Atresmedia ===

Atresmedia, which has been the largest free-to-air television network in terms of audience since 2022, emerged in 2011 from the merger of two major broadcasters: Grupo Antena 3 and GIA La Sexta . It is owned by the Grupo Planeta. and it is composed of 6 channels. Antena 3 and La Sexta are generalist channels, while the rest are focused on different target groups.

Grupo Antena 3 traces its origins to those of its flagship channel, Antena 3, one of the nationwide private television networks that received a broadcasting licence in 1989. Antena 3 airs general programs such as news, movies, reality shows, sport events and quizzes. Antena 3 has been the most-watched television channel in Spain since November 2021 (except summer 2024, when the title was claimed by La 1).

The network's secondary generalist channel, laSexta, traces its origins to the granting of another private license in 2005. It was then jointly owned by the Mexican giant Televisa (40%) and the Grupo Audiovisual de Medios de Producción (60%), which was in turn participated by Grupo Árbol-Globomedia (40%), Mediapro (38%), Drive (10%), El Terrat (7%) and Bainet (5%).

Channel	Type	Launch date	Average audience share (2025)
Antena 3	Generalist	25 January 1990	12.8%
La Sexta	Generalist	25 November 2005	6.2%
Nova	Female-audience	30 November 2005	2.0%
Neox	Entertainment	30 November 2005	1.8%
MEGA	Male-audience	1 July 2015	1.3%
Atreseries	TV shows	22 December 2015	1.9%
Atresmedia		14 December 2011	26.0%

=== Mediaset España ===

Mediaset España has its origins in the Gestevisión Telecinco, a society created in 1989 that was granted one of the first licenses for private free-to-air analogic terrestrial TV private channels in Spain: Tele 5 (later branded as Telecinco). It was founded by Italian media tycoon Silvio Berlusconi's Fininvest (25%), Grupo Anaya (25%), ONCE (25%) and other shareholders (25%). In 2009, already in the TDT transition era, Gestevisión agreed with PRISA's Sogecuatro to merge their businesses (most notably their flagship channels Telecinco and Cuatro), with Gestevisión absorbing Sogecuatro in exchange of a minor participation of PRISA as shareholder of Gestevisión. In 2011, the media conglomerate was renamed Mediaset España Comunicación S.A. PRISA eventually sold its remaining shares in 2015. Owned by the Berlusconi family, Mediaset España is part of MediaForEurope since 3 May 2023, which also includes the Italian group Mediaset S.p.A.

The flagship channel of the network remains Telecinco, which is the third most-watched television channel in Spain. Telecinco experienced its best audience figures throughout much of the 2000s and 2010s, during which it remained the most-watched channel in the country. Its programming was focused on gossip and reality shows. The channel had a bad reputation due to accusations of ‘trash TV’, but still managed to achieve high audience ratings. After Paolo Vasile stepped down as CEO in 2023, the group decided to revamp the programming of its channels, moving away from any shows or content that might be considered controversial and aiming to offer family-friendly content. Since then, Telecinco's audiences have plummeted, falling from the most-watched channel in Spain to third place. As the second generalist channel in the Mediaset network, Cuatro airs general programs such as news, movies, documentaries, reality shows, sport events and quizzes. Mediaset has 7 television channels, more than any other group in the country. Mediaset remains as the second most-watched television group.

Channel	Type	Launch date	Average audience share (2025)
Telecinco	Generalist	3 March 1990	9.4%
Cuatro	Generalist	7 November 2005	5.8%
FDF	Entertainment	18 February 2008	2.4%
Boing	Children	1 September 2010	1.0%
Divinity	Female-audience	1 March 2011	1.4%
Energy	Male-audience	9 January 2012	2.5%
Be Mad	Movies	21 April 2016	1.8%
Mediaset España		14 April 2011	24.3%

=== Unidad Editorial ===
Unidad Editorial is a Spanish media company, emerged from the merger of Unedisa (controlled by Italian media conglomerate RCS MediaGroup) and Grupo Recoletos. Unidad Editorial is the owner of some of the major Spanish newspapers, such as El Mundo, Expansión and MARCA, as well as some radio channels such as esRadio. It has two nationwide television licenses, operated by its subsidiary Veo Televisión, which leases them to other companies.

Channel	Type	Owners	Launch date	Average audience share (2025)
DMAX	Variety	Unidad Editorial and Warner Bros. Discovery EMEA	12 January 2012	1.7%
Veo7	Generalist	Unidad Editorial and Mediapro	18 June 2025	0.6%
Unidad Editorial			2007	2.3%

=== NET TV ===

Sociedad Gestora de Televisión NET TV, S.A., received its first national television license in 2000, which was used to broadcast local contents from Vocento, its major shareholder. In 2005, NET TV receives two more licenses, which would later become Fly Music and Intereconomía. By 2008, The Walt Disney Company becomes one of the major shareholders in the company, replacing Fly Music with Disney Channel, the first free-to-air Disney Channel in the world. In the early 2010s, the group uses one of its licenses for both La Tienda en Casa teleshopping channel and Paramount Channel, before finally choosing the latter in 2012. In May 2014, it lost one of its licenses (MTV) after a ruling from the Supreme Court of Spain. In 2021, Squirrel Media buys most of the group's shares from both Vocento and The Walt Disney Company. After Disney Channel's closure in 2025, Squirrel Media operates its first television channel: Squirrel. Following Paramount Network's closure on 1 January 2026, Squirrel launches its second channel: Squirrel 2.

Channel	Type	Owner	Launch date	Average audience share (2025)
Squirrel	Movies	Squirrel Media	7 January 2025	0.9%
Squirrel 2	Movies	Squirrel Media	1 January 2026	-
NET TV			2002	2.2%

=== Spanish Episcopal Conference ===

The Spanish Episcopal Conference is an administrative institution of the Catholic Church in Spain. It has operated one of the major radio stations in Spain since 1979: COPE. The institution first leased a television license to Unidad Editorial in 2010, launching its first television channel: 13tv. In 2015, it was among the six companies chosen to receive its own broadcasting license. As such, 13tv was relaunched as TRECE, basing its programming on information, cinema, and religious affairs about Catholic Church and the Pope.

Channel	Type	Launch date	Average audience share (2024)
TRECE	Generalist	29 November 2010	1.9%
Conferencia Episcopal Española		1966	1.9%

=== KISS Media ===

Originally founded as Radio Blanca in 1989, KISS Media Group operates radio stations such as Kiss FM and Hit FM. The company's first television channel was Kiss TV in 2005, available via pay television and later becoming free-to-air in some autonomous communities. It was one of the six companies to receive a nationwide broadcasting license in 2015. Ever since, KISS Media is in a joint-venture with Discovery Communications (now part of Warner Bros. Discovery), launching a co-branded channel together called DKISS.

Channel	Type	Launch date	Average audience share (2025)
DKISS	Variety	28 April 2016	1.2%
Grupo KISS Media		21 April 1989	1.2%

=== TEN Media ===

TEN Media was founded as Central Broadcaster Media in 2007 by a former major shareholder of Secuoya Content Group, the owner of many major radio stations such as Cadena SER, LOS40 and DIAL. It was one of the six companies to receive a nationwide broadcasting license in 2015. The channel imports content from other countries, such as reality shows, game shows, and television series. Starting in the mid-2020s, the group also focuses on celebrity news formats and sports programming.

Channel	Type	Launch date	Average audience share (2025)
TEN	Entertainment	28 April 2016	1.1%
TEN Media		2 May 2007	1.1%

=== Real Madrid CF ===
Real Madrid TV was originally founded by Sogecable, part of PRISA in 1999. Since 2001, the channel has been directed entirely by Real Madrid CF. In 2016, it was granted a nationwide broadcasting channel. Despite its name, the channel not only broadcasts football matches, but also basketball matches from Real Madrid's male and female teams. It also broadcasts movies. It is, however, the least-watched nationwide television channel in Spain.

Channel	Type	Launch date	Average audience share (2025)
Real Madrid TV	Sports and movies	1 May 2016	0.6%
Real Madrid TV		14 February 1999	0.6%

=== SIETE ===
SIETE (acronym for Servicios Integrados de Entretenimiento Televisivo) is a consortium promoted by shareholders of PRISA, officially established on 5 November 2025, to take part in the public tender for a new nationwide television license. Its first television channel, La Séptima, will begin broadcasting on 5 November 2026. Its main promoter is José Miguel Contreras, founder of the television production company Globomedia and known for leading the channel La Sexta in its early days in the 2000s. The group revealed their plans on 7 July 2026, aiming to offer generalist content, with news and entertainment as its main programming.

Channel	Type	Launch date	Average audience share (2026)
La Séptima	Generalist	5 November 2026	N/A
SIETE		5 November 2025	N/A

== Regional broadcasters ==
Many of the Spanish regions (comunidades autónomas) have their own network service. Most of these channels (popularly known as "las (cadenas) autonómicas") are public-owned and integrated in FORTA ("Federación de Organismos de Radio Televisión Autonómicos"), an association of 12 public regional network services allowing them to share their content and produce new formats together. Despite private regional broadcasters being allowed, most autonomous communities do not have one. On the other hand, four autonomous communities have a single private-owned regional broadcaster: Castile and León, Cantabria, Navarra and La Rioja, these channels cannot be integrated into FORTA, since it requires them to be public-owned. Canal Extremadura Televisión is the only public regional broadcaster not integrated in FORTA.

Regional broadcasters have their own programming adapted to the regions they broadcast. For instance, Televisión Canaria uses Western European Time, the local time zone. Some other broadcasters, such as Catalonia's TV3, Balearic IB3, Galicia's TVG, Basque Country's ETB 1 and Valencian Community's À Punt mostly broadcast in their regional language, instead of Spanish.

Since the 2010s, most regional broadcasters have plummeted in terms of audience. Regional broadcasters still have high audience rates in Catalonia (which is the only region were the regional generalist broadcaster has a higher audience share than national broadcasters), Galicia, Aragon, the Basque Country and Andalusia.

Channel	Type	Regions	Language	Ownership	Owner	Launch date	Average audience share (2025)
Canal Sur	Generalist	Andalusia; Ceuta; Melilla; Gibraltar	Spanish	Public	RTVA	28 February 1989	9.5%
Canal Sur 2	Sign-language simulcast of Canal Sur	Andalusia; Ceuta; Melilla; Gibraltar	Spanish	Public	RTVA	5 June 1998	N/A
Andalucía TV	Generalist	Andalusia; Ceuta; Melilla; Gibraltar	Spanish	Public	RTVA	28 February 2015	0.4% (2024)
Aragón TV	Generalist	Aragon	Spanish	Public	CARTV	21 April 2006	12.2%
TPA 7	Generalist	Asturias	Spanish and Asturian	Public	RTPA	20 December 2005	4.3%
TPA 8	1-hour timeshift of TPA 7	Asturias	Spanish and Asturian	Public	RTPA	26 May 2007	0.8%
IB3	Generalist	Balearic Islands	Catalan and Spanish	Public	ERPTVIB	1 March 2005	4.8%
Fibwi4	Generalist	Balearic Islands	Catalan and Spanish	Private	Fibwi	2 July 2021	N/A
Televisión Canaria	Generalist	Canary Islands	Spanish	Public	RTVC	21 August 1999	6.2%
TV3	Generalist	Catalonia; Andorra	Catalan and Aranese	Public	CCMA	10 September 1983	14.2%
SX3 (daytime); 33 (nighttime)	Kids and teens (daytime); Culture (nighttime)	Catalonia; Andorra	Catalan and Aranese	Public	CCMA	10 October 2022; 10 September 1998	0.7% (2024)
3CatInfo	News	Catalonia; Andorra	Catalan and Aranese	Public	CCMA	11 September 2003	1.6%
Esport3	Sports	Catalonia; Andorra	Catalan and Aranese	Public	CCMA	5 February 2011	1.3% (2024)
La 2 Cat	Generalist	Catalonia; Andorra	Catalan	Public	RTVE	13 October 2025	N/A
La 7	Generalist	Castile and Leon	Spanish	Private	CyLTV	9 March 2009	1.4%
La 8	Generalist	Castile and Leon	Spanish	Private	CyLTV	9 March 2009	1.1% (2024)
CMM TV	Generalist	Castile-La Mancha	Spanish	Public	CMM	13 December 2001	5.9%
Canal Extremadura	Generalist	Extremadura	Spanish	Public	CEXMA	15 February 2006	4.8%
TVG	Generalist	Galicia; Northern Portugal	Galician and Spanish	Public	CSAG	24 July 1985	8.4%
tvG2	Generalist	Galicia; Northern Portugal	Galician and Spanish	Public	CSAG	2 February 2009	1.0%
Telemadrid	Generalist	Madrid	Spanish	Public	RTVM	2 May 1989	5.1%
LaOtra	Generalist	Madrid	Spanish	Public	RTVM	19 March 2001	0.9%
La 7	Generalist	Murcia	Spanish	Public	TAM	14 April 2006	3.2%
Navarra Televisión	Generalist	Navarra	Spanish and Basque	Private	Promecal	14 May 2012	N/A
Navarra TV 2	Generalist	Navarra	Spanish and Basque	Private	Promecal	14 May 2012	N/A
TVR	Generalist	La Rioja	Spanish	Private	Vocento	1997	N/A
À Punt	Generalist	Valencian Community	Valencian and Spanish	Public	Valencian Media Corporation	25 April 2018	2.9%
ETB1	Generalist	Basque Country; Navarre	Basque	Public	EITB	31 December 1982	2.1%
ETB2	Generalist	Basque Country; Navarre	Spanish	Public	EITB	31 May 1986	8.3%
ETB1 On	Kids and teens Contents from ETB 1	Basque Country; Navarre	Basque	Public	EITB	10 October 2008 (ETB3) 18 March 2026 (ETB1 On)	0.2%
ETB2 On	Sports and entertainment from ETB 2	Basque Country; Navarre	Basque and Spanish	Public	EITB	29 October 2014 (ETB4) 18 March 2026 (ETB2 On)	1.0% (2024)
BOM Cine	Movies	Andalusia; Madrid; Murcia; Valencian Community	Spanish	Private	Squirrel Media	30 April 2014	0.3%
El Toro TV	Generalist	Balearic Islands; Madrid; Valencian Community	Spanish	Private	Intereconomía Corporation	14 March 2019	N/A

== Defunct channels ==
=== Nationwide defunct channels ===
The following table lists the television channels that have ceased broadcasting in Spain. Green color indicates that the channel continued its broadcasts on pay television.

Channel	Type	Owner	Launch date	Closing date	Replaced by
Canal Nostalgia	Archive programming	RTVE	15 September 1997	30 November 2005	TVE 50 Años
TVE 50 Años	Archive programming	RTVE	30 November 2005	1 January 2007	Clan
Telehit	Music	Televisa and GIA La Sexta	18 June 2006	31 July 2007	Hogar 10
Telecinco Estrellas	Entertainment	Gestevisión Telecinco	30 November 2005	17 February 2008	FDF
Telecinco Sport	Sports	Gestevisión Telecinco	30 November 2005	17 February 2008	Telecinco 2
Net TV (Spain)	Generalist	NET TV	1 June 2002	3 March 2008	Intereconomía TV
Fly Music	Music	NET TV	30 November 2005	30 June 2008	Disney Channel
Docu	Documentary	RTVE	10 October 1994	23 April 2009	Cultural·es
Telecinco 2	Mixed-format	Gestevisión Telecinco	18 February 2008	18 May 2009	La Siete
Hogar 10	Entertainment	GIA La Sexta	31 July 2007	14 August 2009	Gol Televisión
Sony TV en VEO	Entertainment	Sony Channel and Veo Televisión	12 June 2006	1 May 2010	AXN (Spain)
40 Latino	Music	PRISA	23 April 2009	23 August 2010	None
Cultural·es	Documentary	RTVE	23 April 2009	10 September 2010	None
Canal Clásico	Classical music	RTVE	8 January 1994	10 September 2010	None
CNN	News	PRISA	27 January 1999	28 December 2010	Gran Hermano 24 horas
Gran Hermano 24 horas	Reality show	Gestevisión Telecinco	28 December 2010	1 March 2011	Divinity
La 10	Generalist	Vocento	22 March 2010	30 March 2012	Paramount Channel
La Sexta 2	Varieties	GIA La Sexta	1 October 2010	1 May 2012	Xplora
MARCA TV	Sports	Unidad Editorial and Mediapro	28 August 2010	31 July 2013	La Tienda en Casa
TVE HD	Generalist test-channel	RTVE	6 August 2008	31 December 2013	La 1 HD
La Sexta 3	Movies	GIA La Sexta	1 November 2010	6 May 2014	Shut down after a ruling by the Supreme Court of Spain
La Siete	Entertainment	Mediaset España	18 May 2009	6 May 2014	Shut down after a ruling by the Supreme Court of Spain
MTV	Music	Paramount Global	10 September 2000	6 May 2014	Shut down after a ruling by the Supreme Court of Spain
Nitro	Male-audience	Atresmedia	23 August 2010	6 May 2014	Shut down after a ruling by the Supreme Court of Spain
Nueve	Entertainment	Mediaset España	31 December 2012	6 May 2014	Shut down after a ruling by the Supreme Court of Spain
Xplora	Documentary	Atresmedia	1 May 2012	6 May 2014	Shut down after a ruling by the Supreme Court of Spain
AXN (Spain)	Movies and TV series	Sony Pictures	5 November 1998	6 May 2014	Shut down after a ruling by the Supreme Court of Spain
Gol Televisión	Sports	Mediapro and Atresmedia	19 September 2008	30 June 2015	MEGA
Intereconomía TV	Generalist	Intereconomía Corporation	1 July 2005	14 March 2019	El Toro TV
Disney Channel	Animation and TV series	The Walt Disney Company	17 April 1998	7 January 2025	Squirrel
GOL PLAY	Sports and TV series	Mediapro	1 June 2016	17 June 2025	Veo7
Paramount Network	Movies	Paramount Global	30 March 2012	31 December 2025	Squirrel 2
Disney Jr.	Childrens	The Walt Disney Company	11 June 2011	1 April 2026	Disney Channel

=== Defunct regional channels ===
Channel	Type	Autonomous community	Owner	Launch date	Closing date
Nou 2	Generalist	Valencian Community	Radiotelevisió Valenciana (Public)	9 October 1997	5 July 2013
Nou	Generalist	Valencian Community	Radiotelevisió Valenciana (Public)	9 October 1989	29 November 2013 (succeeded by À Punt in 2018)
Nou 24	News	Valencian Community	Radiotelevisió Valenciana (Public)	3 February 2009	29 November 2013
8tv	Generalist	Catalonia; Andorra	Emissions Digitals de Catalunya (Private)	23 April 2001	17 October 2023
Televisión Murciana	Generalist	Region of Murcia	Grupo Zambudio (private)	circa 1995	31 March 2024

=== Relaunched channels ===
As of 2026, only three television channel have been re-released after its shutdown.

Channel	Type	Owner	Launch date	Closing date	Relaunch date
La Tienda en Casa	Teleshopping	El Corte Inglés and several broadcasters	15 December 2006 (as La Tienda en Casa by Unidad Editorial)	29 November 2010 (replaced by Trece); 30 September 2010 (Shut down for legal reasons); 1 April 2011 (replaced by Paramount Channel); 31 December 2012 (replaced by Nueve); 6 May 2014 (Shut down after a ruling by the Supreme Court of Spain)	1 January 2008 (as Cincoshop by Gestevisión Telecinco); 2008 (as Promo then Canal Club by PRISA); 1 January 2010 (by Vocento); 1 April 2011 (by Mediaset España); 1 August 2013 (as Tienda by Unidad Editorial); 14 February 2014 (as LTC by Vocento)
Veo7	Generalist	Veo Televisión	30 November 2005	1 January 2012 (replaced by DMAX)	18 June 2025 (replacing GOL PLAY)
Disney Channel	Children’s	The Walt Disney Company	17 April 1998	7 January 2025	1 April 2026 (replacing Disney Jr.)

== Streaming platforms ==
Streaming platforms available in the country consist of foreign video-on-demand platforms and Spanish platforms (mostly subscription-based), as well as television channel platforms (free in the case of public channels, and operating under a mixed model for private channels).

Platform	Owner	Type	Launch date
Filmin	Filmin	Paid subscription	October 2008
Movistar Plus+	Telefónica	Paid subscription	8 July 2015
Netflix	Netflix, Inc.	Paid subscription	20 October 2015
Amazon Prime Video	Amazon	Paid subscription	14 December 2016
Rakuten TV formerly Wuaki.tv (2010-2018)	Rakuten	Free, with paid subscription content	24 May 2018
FlixOlé	FlixOlé	Paid subscription	8 November 2018
DAZN	Access Industries	Paid subscription	27 February 2019
Atresplayer formerly Nubeox (2013-2019)	Atresmedia	Free, with paid subscription content	8 September 2019
Disney+	Disney Streaming	Paid subscription	24 March 2020
Pluto TV	Paramount Skydance	Free, with paid subscription content	26 October 2020
RTVE Play formerly RTVE a la carta (2008-2021)	RTVE	Free	22 June 2021
HBO Max formerly HBO España (2016-2021)	HBO	Paid subscription	26 October 2021
CanalSur Más	Radio y Televisión de Andalucía	Free	15 March 2022
SkyShowtime	Comcast; Paramount Skydance	Paid subscription	28 February 2023
3Cat	Corporació Catalana de Mitjans Audiovisuals	Free	30 October 2023
Mediaset Infinity formerly Mitele (2011-2025)	Mediaset España	Free, with paid subscription content	24 June 2025

== Cable ==
Digital cable is slowly replacing the aging analog service of the major cable provider Vodafone. Telecable, a cable ISP operating in Asturias has begun trials for 1000 mega bytes per second service and is the first to broadcast HD channels. R, a cable operator in Galicia, has completely switched pay TV to digital (DVB-C) by 2008 but free channels are simulcast as analog services, so users without a set-top box can watch them (including most free-to-air channels available on digital terrestrial TV in each location).

== Satellite ==
Digital satellite services has existed since 1997 from Astra and Hispasat satellites. The Movistar Plus+ pay platform has carried some HDTV tests on Astra 19.2°E on 16 June 2005. This platform (before Canal+) has a lot of exclusives channels as "#0" by February 2016 without having to pay the licence of the brand Canal+.

A high definition version of Canal+ 1 (Canal+ 1 HD) formerly called "#0"; started on 29 January 2008, and ended on 31 July 2023, which is now replaced by Movistar Plus+, which is started broadcasting on 1 August 2023, together with HD versions of Canal+ Deportes (now Movistar Deportes) and Canal+ DCine (now Movistar Drama) broadcast from Astra 1KR.

== Teletext ==
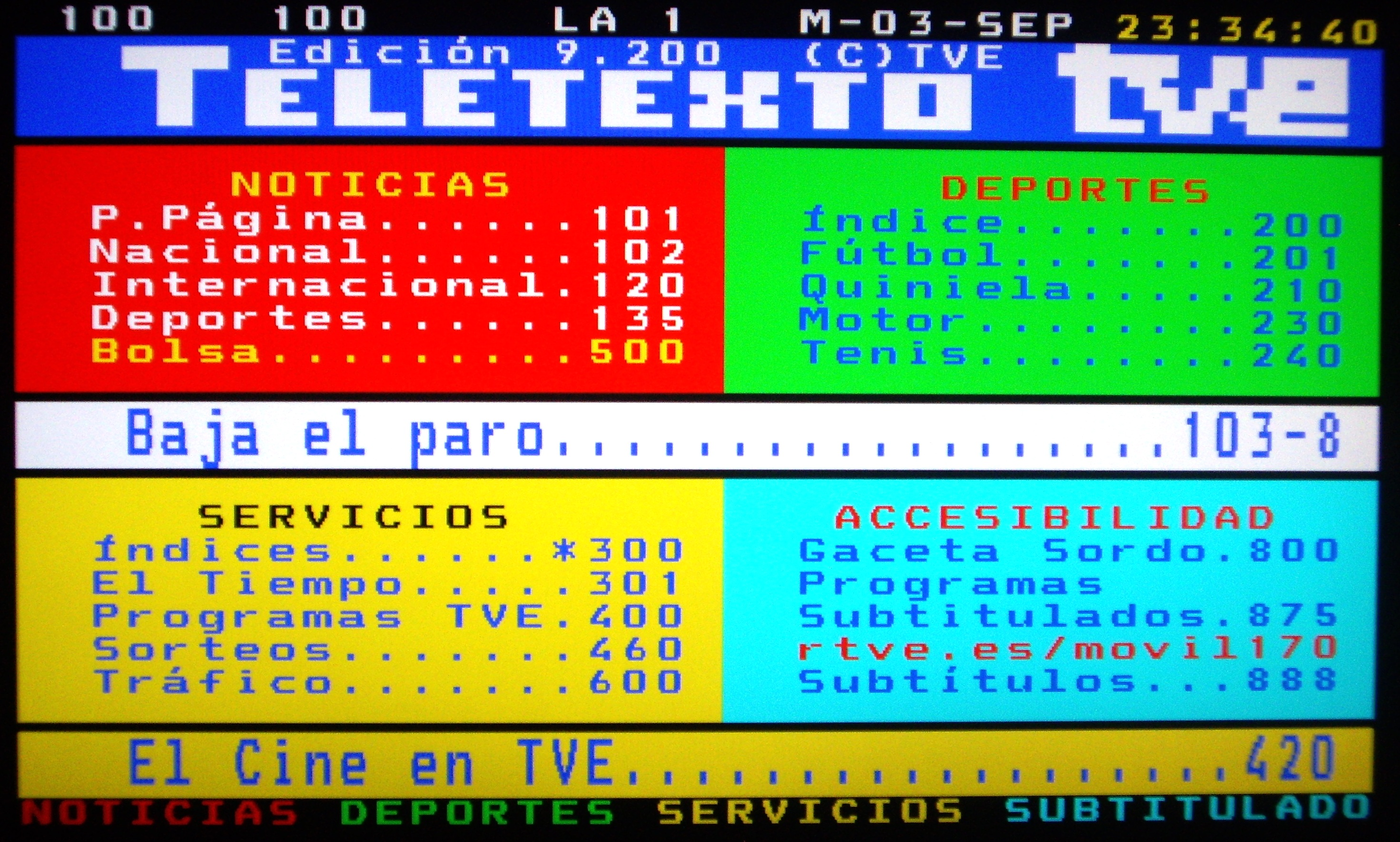
Page 100 of La 1 Teletext on 3 September 2013

Teletext was officially introduced in Spain on 16 May 1988 for RTVE channels. The corporation had invested over 500 million pesetas since the tests began during the 1982 FIFA World Cup. The system is based on a palette of eight colors and 24 lines of 40 characters each, with pages extending from 100 to 899. Teletext content typically includes current news, stock market values, weather forecasts, horoscopes, channel programming and cultural content. In the 1990s, Antena 3, Telecinco and most regional channels created their own versions. During its first few years, over 10 million people accessed teletext daily.

Teletext popularity fell by the 2010s. In 2013, Telemadrid's Teletext was closed since most of its information was already available on their webpage. In 2018, RTVE Teletext was maintained by 10 workers, whose main focus was immediacy in the news rather than creating exclusive content. By the end of the decade, over 99.7% of the Spanish population had access to Teletext, but only 2 million people used it daily, mainly for access to subtitles for people with hearing impairments. RTVE invested €20,570 for the renewal of Teletext system in 2025.

== Programming ==
=== News broadcasts ===
Telediario is the longest running programme in the history of Spanish television, broadcasting daily since 15 September 1957

Antena 3 Noticias is the leading news programme in Spain since 2020

Spain's main news programmes are La 1's Telediario, Antena 3's Antena 3 Noticias and Telecinco's Informativos Telecinco. They are among the most watched TV programmes in the country and have a fixed place in the daily programming, with Antena 3 Noticias leading since 2020. They are broadcast three times a day at 6:00 AM, 3:00 PM and 9:00 PM. The morning edition is not broadcast on weekends. Telediario also broadcasts regional news on weekdays at 1:55 PM (25 minutes) and 3:40 PM (10 minutes). News programs usually begin with political news (unless there is other breaking news), then move on to general news and sports news, finishing with a weather forecast for a total duration of between 45 minutes and 1 hour. Most newscasts make use of advanced graphics, including augmented reality.

La Sexta Noticias, Noticias Cuatro and most regional channel news programmes are typically broadcast one hour earlier than the main news programmes, so as not to coincide with them. Channel 24 Horas is RTVE's public 24-hour news rolling service and its news are also broadcast on La 1 during programming gaps. Most generalist channels interrupt their regular programming to broadcast special reports when necessary.

=== Game shows ===
Despite their introduction in the late 1950s, game shows were not particularly popular in Spain until the 1970s, when Un, dos, tres... responda otra vez debuted on RTVE channels. Saber y ganar (1997–present), La 2's flagship quiz show, is the longest-running quiz show on Spanish television, being broadcast daily since 1997. Its host, Jordi Hurtado, is also the longest-running TV game show host in Spain. Cifras y letras has been broadcast on both RTVE channels (1991-1996, 2024–present) and regional channels (2002-2013). Atrápame si puedes has had several regional versions on FORTA channels since 2014.

Some internationals adaptations have been broadcast on several channels, such as El precio justo (1988-1993, 1999-2001, 2021), an adaptation of the American format The Price is Right, La ruleta de la suerte (1990-1997, 2006-), an adaptation of the American format Wheel of Fortune or ¿Quién quiere ser millonario? (1999-2001, 2005-2009, 2020-present) an adaptation of the British format Who Wants to Be a Millionaire?. Pasapalabra is the most popular TV game show in Spain and one of the very few that are not broadcast on prime time (airing instead at 8:00 PM, just before Antena 3 Noticias).

On the other hand, Antena 3's Tu cara me suena is the most popular Spanish TV game show worldwide, with over 45 adaptations in different countries under the Your Face Sounds Familiar franchise.

Since the 2020s, some broadcasters have focused on international adaptations rather than original productions, such as Antena 3's Mask Singer and La 1's The Floor.

=== Reality shows ===
Gran Hermano, the Spanish adaptation of Big Brother was first broadcast in 2000 and quickly became one of the most popular TV shows in the country. It is one of the international adaptations with the most seasons, with more than 30. Telecinco, one of the main three generalist channels, is also widely known as a reality show channel. In addition to Gran Hermano, the channel also broadcasts the Spanish versions of Survivor (Supervivientes, 2000–present) and Temptation Island (La Isla de las Tentaciones, 2020–present).

=== Talent shows ===
Operación Triunfo, the very first edition of Star Academy, was first broadcast in Spain in 2001. It is one of the most important talent shows in the country. Its many seasons have been broadcast on La 1, Telecinco and Amazon Prime Video.

There has also been several adaptations of international talent shows, such as La Voz (2012–present), based on Dutch format The Voice; Factor X (2007-2008, 2018, 2024), an adaptation of British format The X Factor; Fama, ¡a bailar! based on the Chilean format Fama, or Got Talent España (2016–present).

=== Fiction ===
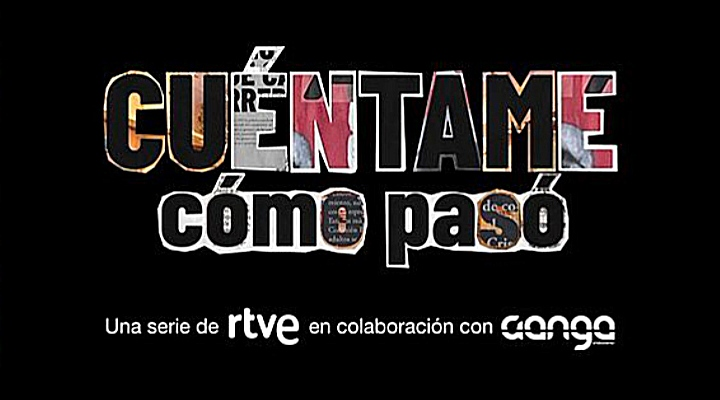
Cuéntame cómo pasó (2001-2023) is the longest-running Spanish series.

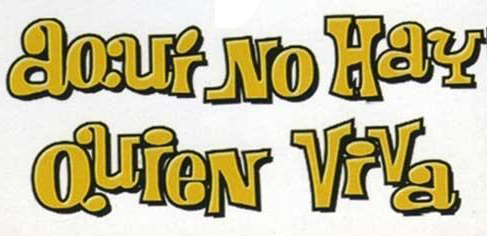
Aquí no hay quien viva remains widely popular and is still broadcast daily on Spanish television, despite the series ending in 2006.

Money Heist was broadcast on Spanish TV channel Antena 3 before it was bought by Netflix.

During the more than three decades of TVE's monopoly over TV broadcasting, TVE delivered a diverse fiction offer, both in terms of dramas and comedies as well as different production standards, although there was no special interest in an extended run of their series, and many of them simply often fit a prototypical one season & 13 episode profile. TVE also imported fiction series from the United States.

During the 1960s and 1970s, the scope of domestic fiction focused on theatrical and literary adaptations as well as region-themed fiction; in the particular case of comedy, productions underpinned the sense of costumbrismo and everyday life. Verano azul (1981-1982), broadcast on La 1 (then one of two television channels in Spain), is the most-watched television series in the country's history, with up to 20 million viewers.

By the early 1990s, in the context of the entry of the private channels, domestically produced comedy fiction series seized on the prime time slot, until then a dominion of game shows, foreign series and domestic dramas. A tendency to lengthen the duration of the episodes of comedy series manifested in this transitional period.

Most of Spain's most popular national fiction series were released in the 1990s and 2000s, such as Médico de familia (1995-1999), Cuéntame cómo pasó (2001-2023), Los Serrano (2003-2008), Aída (2005-2014), El Internado (2007-2010), Aquí no hay quien viva (2003-2006) and its spiritual successor: La que se avecina (2007–present)

After its kickstart in 2018, Turkish soap operas had become popular in Spain by 2021. Also in the 2020s, low-budget "uplifting" German films had become a staple of the sobremesa timeslot on weekends (on TVE and Antena 3). Driven by appeals to nostalgia, 2021 saw a number of projects remaking or reviving former Spanish fiction series. Despite evening Spanish soap operas such as La Promesa and Sueños de libertad gathering great audience figures on La 1 and Antena 3, national fiction on prime time has mainly lost its popularity in the 2020s, with television channels broadcasting movies, game shows or live shows instead. Spanish fiction has moved to Internet platforms, such as Amazon Prime Video and Netflix, with series like Élite, Money Heist and Alpha Males.

== See also ==
- List of Spanish-language television channels
- List of Catalan-language television channels
- List of television stations in Spain
- Media of Spain
- List of newspapers in Spain
- List of radio stations in Spain
- Internet in Spain
- Telecommunications in Spain
