= CincoMAS =

- Country: Spain
- Network: Mediaset España
- Headquarters: Madrid

Programming
- Picture format: 1080i HDTV (downscaled to 16:9 576i/480i for the SDTV feed)

Ownership
- Owner: Mediaset España
- Sister channels: Telecinco; Cuatro; Factoría de Ficción; Boing; Divinity; Energy; Be Mad

History
- Launched: 22 January 2016
- Closed: 21 May 2020

Links
- Website: https://www.cincomas.com

CincoMAS was an international pay television channel owned by Mediaset España. The channel was available in the Americas. It was officially launched on 22 January 2016.

== History of CincoMAS ==
After the international success of Spanish channels such as TVE Internacional, Antena 3 Internacional and Atreseries Internacional, on 2015 Mediaset España decided to launch its own international channel. CincoMAS was launched on January 22, 2016. In November 2017, Olympusat added the channel to its VEMOX platform in the United States.

In May 2020 Mediaset España decided to end the channel's broadcasts to integrate its offer into a new international streaming platform.

== Programming ==
Cincomas offered a variety of programming including TV series, entertainment, news, and sports. Including successful programs from Mediaset Spain channel, such as Telecinco and Cuatro.

TV series

- Aída
- Ángel o demonio
- B&b
- El padre de Caín
- El Príncipe
- Ella es tu padre
- La que se avecina
- Tierra de lobos
- Lo que escondían sus ojos

Entertainment/reality shows

- Gran Hermano Dúo
- Sálvame
- Sálvame Deluxe
- Sábado Deluxe
- Mujeres y hombres y viceversa
- Cámbiame
- Mi casa es la tuya
- Mi casa es la vuestra
- Hay una cosa que te quiero decir
- Viva la vida
- Robin Food
- Convénzeme
- Volverte a ver
- Sopa de Gansos
- Desafío en el abismo
- Chester
- Las Campos
- Los Gipsy Kings

News Programs

- 21 días
- Amores que duelen
- Callejeros
- Callejeros Viajeros
- Conexión Samanta
- Desafío Extremo
- Fuera de Cobertura
- El programa de Ana Rosa
- Informativos y Deportes Telecinco
- Partido a Partido
- Samanta y…
- Frank de la jungla
- Malas Pulgas
- Hotel, Dulce Hotel
- Planeta Calleja
- Volando Voy

== See also ==
- Mediaset
- Telecinco
