= Nuria Marín Font =

Spanish television presenter

Nuria Marín
- Born: Nuria Marín Font; 29 September 1981 (age 44); Vielha e Mijaran, Lleida, Spain
- Occupation: Television presenter
- Years active: 2004–present
- Employer: Mediaset España

Nuria Marín Font (Vielha e Mijaran, Lleida, September 29, 1981) is a Spanish television presenter, journalist, scriptwriter, editor and program coordinator who has spent most of her career at Mediaset España.

== Biography ==
Nuria studied journalism at Ramon Llull University between 1999 and 2003 and started working as a scriptwriter for the program Kaos on Citytv. She linked this job with that of editor for Super Pop magazine, where she worked for 3 years. Later, in 2008, she started working as a scriptwriter for the program Condició Femenina on Canal Català.

After a short time at the autonomous channel, she began working as coordinator of entertainment programs at La Fábrica de la Tele. For this company, she has worked on programs such as Sálvame, La Caja, El quinto poder, El comecocos or Dale al REC, all on Mediaset España. Her debut as a presenter was in 2013 by the hand of Cazamariposas and, together with Nando Escribano, a program broadcast daily on Divinity and some days on Telecinco and Cuatro, in which she remained until its cancellation in 2020. She also presents and covers various galas and events on Divinity.

Her signing as a collaborator of Hable con ellas on Telecinco was announced in 2016. In July 2017, she signed on as a presenter of Mad in Spain, alongside Jordi González on Telecinco. She joined Sábado Deluxe as a temporary collaborator in January 2018, and on August 3 of that year, she debuted as a substitute presenter of Sálvame.

In February 2020, she began presenting the new Divinity and Cuatro program, La habitación del pánico. That same year, she presented Más tiempo de descuento and La casa fuerte, in addition to co-presenting the programs Hormigas blancas and La última cena.

== Career ==
Year	Title	Channel	Role
2008–2010	El quinto poder	La Siete	Presenter
2013	Concierto «Por Ellas»	Divinity	Reporter
2013–2020	Cazamariposas	Divinity and Cuatro	Presenter
2014–2015	Cazamariposas VIP	Telecinco	Presenter
2015–2016	Preuvas	Divinity	Presenter
2016	Hable con ellas	Telecinco	Collaborator
2017	A tota pantalla	TV3	Collaborator
2017	Especial: La Voz 5	Be Mad	Presenter
2017	Mad in Spain	Telecinco	Presenter
2017–present	Socialité	Telecinco	Presenter
2018–2022	Sálvame	Telecinco	Presenter/Collaborator
2018–2020; 2022–2023	Sábado Deluxe	Telecinco	Collaborator
2018	Hechos reales	Telecinco	Collaborator
2020	Más tiempo del descuento	Telecinco	Presenter
2020	La habitación del pánico	Cuatro and Divinity	Presenter
2020	La casa fuerte	Telecinco	Presenter
2020	Hormigas blancas	Telecinco	Co-Presenter
2020–2021	La última cena	Telecinco	Co-Presenter
2023–present	Està passant	TV3	Collaborator
Upcoming	Love Cost	TV3	Presenter
