= Nueve (Spanish TV channel) =

Spanish television network

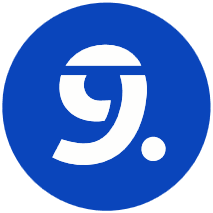
- Country: Spain
- Broadcast area: Spain; Andorra

Programming
- Language: Spanish
- Picture format: 16:9

Ownership
- Owner: Mediaset España Comunicación
- Sister channels: Telecinco; Cuatro; FactoríaDeFicción; LaSiete; Boing; Divinity; Energy

History
- Launched: January 21, 2013
- Closed: May 5, 2014
- Replaced by: La Tienda en Casa

Links
- Website: www.telecinco.es/nueve

Availability

Terrestrial
- Digital: Channel: 67

Nueve was a private Spanish television channel owned by Mediaset España Comunicación. Their programming was aimed at women. Nueve officially began broadcasting its programming on January 21, 2013 (20 days after starting the test broadcasts). The channel used the song "Sweet About Me" by Gabriella Cilmi for its jingle and theme.

== History ==
=== Prospective channel ===
With the expansion of the number of channels in 2010, before the merger of Telecinco and Cuatro, Telecinco was considering launching a free channel dedicated to women. The channel would have been launched on September 1, 2010, as "LaNueve" (The Nine) corresponding to its logical channel number on digital terrestrial television. Its programming would have included: current affairs, entertainment, fiction series and informative spaces for women.

A month after the announcement, Telecinco rescinded the project and replaced it with a children's channel, Boing.

=== Reconfiguration and launch of the channel ===
On December 10, 2012, Mediaset España Comunicación decided to start taking the necessary steps back towards the recovery of the "project LaNueve", throwing a new channel (La Tienda en Casa) to act as a relay station occupying the appropriate signal—Nueve. The chosen name was Nueve, a channel specially aimed at a more conventional female audience. This gamble made by Mediaset would compete directly with the younger and urban focusing Nova channel. One of the more notable things about the "Nueve's" beginnings is that the channel started its official broadcasts on January 21, 2013, just 20 days after its test broadcasts, speaking to its immediate popularity. However, from the outset, the launching was announced for two days later.

=== Closure ===
The channel ceased broadcasting on 5 May 2014, as a consequence of a decision by the Supreme Court that annulled the concessions for nine channels broadcasting in DTT, because their permissions for frequencies were granted without the required public consensus and assignments system according to the Audiovisual Law.

== Programming ==
Nueve's programming was especially aimed at a more conventional female audience, with a daily schedule consisting of miniseries, telenovelas, TV-series, news programs, talent shows and a live 12-hour broadcasting of the Big Brother Spain house.
