= La pecera de Eva =

Television series

- Genre: Teen drama
- Starring: Alexandra Jiménez
- Country of origin: Spain
- Original language: Spanish
- No. of seasons: 4
- No. of episodes: 247

Production
- Production company: Isla Producciones

Original release
- Network: Telecinco; LaSiete; Factoría de Ficción
- Release: 10 January 2010 – 4 December 2012

La pecera de Eva (lit. 'Eva's Fish Tank') is a Spanish television series produced by Isla Producciones starring Alexandra Jiménez as Eva Padrón, a psychologist working in a high school. Its four seasons aired from January 2010 to December 2011 on Telecinco, LaSiete and Factoría de Ficción.

== Premise ==
The fiction focuses on how Eva Padrón (Alexandra Jiménez), a psychologist entering to work in a high school (the Instituto Unamuno), deals with the issues troubling the students who attend to her consultation, including the likes of abortions, suicides, murders, deficits in social functioning, exclusion, bullying, obesity, masturbation or stuttering.

== Cast ==
- Alexandra Jiménez as Eva Padrón.
- María Ballesteros as María Padrón.
- Juan Luppi as Martín.
- Ana del Rey as Olivia.
- Marta Jurado as Maca.
- Joel Bosqued as Nacho.
- Javier Sesmilo as Hugo.
- Nacho Aldeguer as Fernando.
- Belinda Washington as Fernando's mother.
- Nasser Saleh as Leo.
- Aura Garrido as Esther.

Introduced in season 2

- Vicky Luengo as Ariadna Solano, "Ari".
- Miriam Raya as Carla Berlanga.
- Carlos Martínez as Jacobo Suárez, "Jaki".
- Jorge Clemente as Manuel Zafra, "Manu".

Introduced in season 3

- Marta Poveda as La López.
- Antonio Muñoz de Mesa as César Camacho.
- Susana Abaitúa as Ana.
- Rubén Mascato.
- María Hervás as Sonia.
- Ayoub El Hilali as Taher.
- Ahmed Younoussi.
- Eduardo Ferré.

Introduced in season 4

- Ángel Muñiz as Poli.
- Nacho Montes as Juan.
- Cristina Llorente as Andrea.
- Beatriz Pascual as Bea.
- Melanie Blanco as Pilar.
- Sergio Parralejo as Rober.

== Production and release ==
Produced by Isla Producciones, shooting began by November 2009. Following its release on Telecinco on 10 January 2010, the series was moved to the sister channel LaSiete, starting to be broadcast from Monday through Friday. The series was again moved to Factoría de Ficción (FDF) for its fourth season. The broadcasting run ended after 247 episodes, on 4 December 2011.

Series	Episodes	Originally released			Ref.
Series	Episodes	First released	Last released	Network	Ref.
1	65	10 January 2010	23 May 2020	Telecinco/LaSiete	
2	65	24 May 2010	22 August 2010	LaSiete	
3	65	30 August 2010	26 November 2010	LaSiete	
4	52	17 September 2011	4 December 2011	Factoría de Ficción	
