= Hogar 10 =

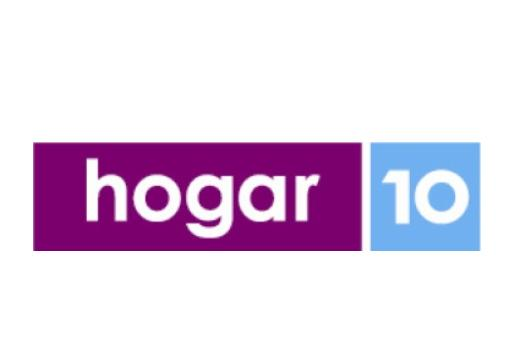

Programming
- Picture format: 576i (4:3 SDTV)

Ownership
- Owner: Gestora de Inversiones Audiovisuales La Sexta

History
- Launched: 31 July 2007; 17 years ago
- Closed: 14 August 2009; 15 years ago
- Replaced by: Gol Televisión

Hogar 10 was a channel of the Spanish Digital Terrestrial Television and replaced Telehit emissions starting 31 July 2007 at 8.30 pm with the first program "Hoy cocinas tú" (You cook today), presented by Eva Arguiñano. This channel owned by laSexta and aired by DTT through the multiplex 69 (with Antena 3, Neox and Nova).

On 14 August 2009, Hogar 10 was replaced by Gol Televisión.

== Programming ==
The programming consisted of craft programs, cooking shows, soap operas, health programs, contests, humor programs, etc. The channel also opted for soap operas like Esmeralda and That's them, from laSexta Productions partner, Televisa.

The channel featured a diverse programming and with the goal of reaching all audiences. Through programs like Taste of Home deal with every day issues related to leisure, gastronomy, decoration, health, family, or Internet. One of the strongest betting Hogar 10, was his food program, led by Eva Arguiñano, where different menus kitchen through you cookToday. The program Do not know, no answer, hosted by Miki Nadal, also became popular among the public.

This channel also hosted the party Liga: Recreativo de Huelva – Sevilla FC, the first Spanish soccer game that was only issued in DTT. The network hosted this party at the time of the so-called soccer war between LaSexta/Mediapro, Cuatro/Sogecable and Telecinco.

This chain reissued on 3 April 2010 with the advent of analogue switch to be in a multiplex next laSexta and Gol Televisión
