= Canal+ 2 =

- Country: Spain
- Broadcast area: Nationwide
- Headquarters: Madrid, Spain

Programming
- Language: Spanish
- Picture format: 576i (SDTV)

Ownership
- Owner: Telefónica
- Sister channels: Canal+ 1

History
- Launched: July 21, 2003; 22 years ago (in Digital+); August 23, 2010; 15 years ago (DTT)
- Replaced: 40 Latino
- Closed: July 8, 2015; 10 years ago

Links
- Website: http://www.plus.es

Canal+ 2 (Spanish: Canal+ Two) was a Spanish television channel in operated by Telefonica. It was available through the satellite platform Canal+. It was available through Digital terrestrial television from 2010 to 2011.

== History ==
On July 21, 2003, with the birth of Digital+, Canal+ 2 launched as a merge between Canal+ Rojo and Canal+ Azul into Canal+ 2.

After the leak of the news in various forums, rumors of a new entertainment channel for DTT under the Canal+ label spread, in January 2010 it was announced that 40 Latino would cease its free-to-air broadcasts on August 23, 2010. Prisa TV later confirmed in a press release that, after much speculation, Canal+ 2 would become Canal+ Dos to make the transition to DTT with new and diverse content.

However, Canal+ 2 stopped broadcasting on DTT on December 19, 2011, due to the lack of success of Premium DTT and it was replaced by Energy, owned by Mediaset España.

On July 8, 2015, after the birth of Movistar+, the channel was relaunched as Canal+ Series Xtra.
