= Factoría de Ficción (TV channel, 2000–2007) =

- Country: Spain
- Broadcast area: Spain; Andorra

Programming
- Language(s): Spanish

Ownership
- Owner: Globomedia, Grupo Antena 3, Gestevisión Telecinco
- Sister channels: Antena 3, La Sexta, Neox, Nova, Telehit, Telecinco, Telecinco Estrellas, Telecinco Sport

History
- Launched: May 19, 2000
- Closed: July 1, 2007

Links
- Website: factoriadeficcion.com

Factoría de Ficción (lit. 'Factory of Fiction') was a Spanish specialty television channel specialised in drama series, available on satellite and cable TV providers. It started operations on 19 June 2000, and was available through satellite platform Digital+ and cable operator ONO. The channel was owned by Globomedia, Grupo Antena 3 and Gestevisión Telecinco.

Factoría de Ficción broadcast mostly Spanish TV shows but also some international programming. The episodes of Spanish series were broadcast by this channel about 1–2 weeks after they premiered on Antena 3 and Telecinco.

It broadcast series such as 7 vidas, Los Serrano, Mis adorables vecinos, Hospital Central, Motivos Personales and The Tribe, as well as older series like Manos a la Obra and Antivicio and the Canadian series Are You Afraid of the Dark?.

The channel closed on 1 June 2007 due to contract renewal problems with Digital+. On 18 February 2008, Gestevisión Telecinco relaunched its free-to-air TV channel Telecinco Estrellas as FDF Telecinco, and later as the new Factoría de Ficción.
