= FDF =

FDF may refer to:

- Djiboutian Football Federation (French: Fédération Djiboutienne de Football)
- Dominican Football Federation (Spanish: Federación Dominicana de Fútbol)
- Factoría de Ficción, a Spanish free-to-air television channel
  - Factoría de Ficción (TV channel, 2000–2007), a defunct Spanish specialty television channel available on cable and satellite TV providers
- Fascist Defence Force, the paramilitary section of the British Union of Fascists (BUF)
- Federal Department of Finance, in Switzerland
- Finished dosage form
- Finnish Defence Forces, Finnish military
- Food and Drink Federation, a British trade association
- Forms Data Format, a file format associated with Portable Document Format (PDF)
- Francophone Democratic Federalists, known earlier as the Democratic Front of Francophones (Front Démocratique des Francophones), a political party in Belgium
- Frivilligt Drenge- og Pige-Forbund, a Danish youth organization
- Martinique Aimé Césaire International Airport, on Martinique
