= Mediaset Infinity =

Mediaset Infinity may refer to:

- Mediaset Infinity (Italy), an Italian video streaming service
- Mediaset Infinity (Spain), a Spanish video streaming service
