= Hidden Murder =

- Theatrical release poster
- Spanish: Parecido a un asesinato
- Directed by: Antonio Hernández
- Screenplay by: Rafael Calatayud Cano
- Based on: Parecido a un asesinato by Juan Bolea
- Produced by: Ramiro Acero
- Starring: Blanca Suárez; Eduardo Noriega; Tamar Novas; Claudia Mora; Joaquín Climent; Marian Álvarez; Raúl Prieto
- Cinematography: Guillem Oliver
- Edited by: Antonio Frutos
- Music by: Luis Ivars
- Production companies: Sunrise Pictures; Parecido a un asesinato la película AIE; Prisma Cine
- Distributed by: Vértice 360
- Release dates: 23 September 2025 (Zinemaldia); 3 October 2025 (Spain)
- Running time: 111 minutes
- Countries: Spain; Argentina
- Language: Spanish

Hidden Murder (Spanish: Parecido a un asesinato, lit. 'murder-alike') is a 2025 psychological thriller film directed by Antonio Hernández from a screenplay by Rafa Calatayud based on the novel by Juan Bolea. It stars Blanca Suárez, Eduardo Noriega, Tamar Novas, and Claudia Mora.

== Plot ==
The seemingly joyful life of Eva, now living with writer Nazario and the latter's teen daughter Alicia is threatened by the harassment of her former partner José, who abused Eva in the past.

== Cast ==
- Blanca Suárez as Eva
- Eduardo Noriega as Nazario Goyena
- Claudia Mora as Alicia
- Tamar Novas as José
- Marian Álvarez as Celia
- Raúl Prieto as Javi
- Joaquín Climent as Ezequiel

== Production ==
The film was produced by Sunrise Pictures alongside Parecido a un asesinato la película AIE and Prisma Cine, with the association of Telespan 2000 (Squirrel), and the participation of RTVE, Amazon Prime Video, À Punt, and Aragón TV. It was shot in Valencia and in the Pyrenees sector belonging to the province of Huesca.

== Release ==
The film was presented in a RTVE gala at Cines Príncipe during the 73rd San Sebastián International Film Festival in September 2025. Distributed by Vértice 360, it is set to be released theatrically in Spain on 3 October 2025.

== Reception ==
Miguel Ángel Sánchez of HobbyConsolas gave the film 70 points ('good'), deeming it to be a solvent thriller while pointing out that it abuses of some forces dialogue lines in order to spoonfeed things over.

Javier Ocaña of El País considered that the film ostensibly improves during its second third with a "phenomenal" Novas after a questionable first third with bad acting work and stiffness in the collective scenes, otherwise finding the film to be reminiscing of 1990s psychological thrillers such as Cape Fear and Sleeping with the Enemy.

== Accolades ==
Year	Award	Category	Nominee(s)	Result	Ref.
2025	8th Lola Gaos Awards	Best Original Score	Luis Ivars	Nominated	
2025	8th Lola Gaos Awards	Best Original Song	"Caminar el tiempo" by Blanca Paloma and Luis Ivars	Won	
2026	40th Goya Awards	Best Original Song	"Caminar el tiempo" by Blanca Paloma Ramos, Jose Pablo Polo, Luis Ivars	Nominated	

== See also ==
- List of Spanish films of 2025
