= Paramount Network (disambiguation) =

Paramount Network is an American basic cable television channel.

Paramount Network may also refer to:

- Paramount Network (international), a brand of international channels that were previously known as Paramount Channel, and are currently broadcast in some countries in Latin America, in Europe and in Asia-Pacific.
- Paramount Television Network, a short-lived ad-hoc television network operated by Paramount from 1948 to 1956
- Paramount Television Service, a proposed but unrealized network which was scheduled to launch in 1978
- United Paramount Network, which operated from 1995 to 2006 (and which briefly planned a name change to Paramount Network in 2000)
- Paramount Network (Spain), a Spanish version of Paramount Network launched in June 2018 that was originally the first incarnation of the Paramount Channel
- Paramount Network (British TV channel), the British equivalent of Paramount Network which launched in July 2018
