= Spanish television =

Spanish television may refer to:

- Television in Spain
- Televisión Española, the national state-owned public-service television broadcaster in Spain.
