= LaSiete =

- Country: Spain
- Broadcast area: Nationwide

Programming
- Language: Spanish
- Picture format: 576i (SDTV)

Ownership
- Owner: Mediaset España
- Sister channels: Telecinco; Cuatro; FactoríaDeFicción; Boing; Divinity; Energy; Nueve

History
- Launched: 18 February 2008
- Replaced: Telecinco Sport
- Closed: 5 May 2014
- Former names: Telecinco 2 (2008-2009)

Links
- Website: telecinco.es/lasiete (Close Website)

Availability

Terrestrial
- Digital: Mux 68

LaSiete (English: The Seven), formerly known as Telecinco 2, was a Spanish digital terrestrial television channel, operated by Mediaset España. It began its broadcasts on 18 February 2008, replacing Telecinco Sport. On 18 May 2009, Telecinco 2 changed its name to LaSiete. In early February 2014, it was confirmed that LaSiete would become a telenovela channel. On February 14, 2014, LaSiete officially became a new telenovelas channel and broadcast telenovelas until its closure in May.

== Closure ==
The channel ceased broadcasting on 5 May 2014, as a consequence of a decision by the Supreme Court that annulled the concessions for nine channels broadcasting in DTT, because their permissions for frequencies were granted without the required public consensus and assignments system according to the Audiovisual Law.

== Logos ==
18 February 2008 to 8 September 2008

8 September 2008 to 25 July 2009

25 July 2009 to 6 February 2012

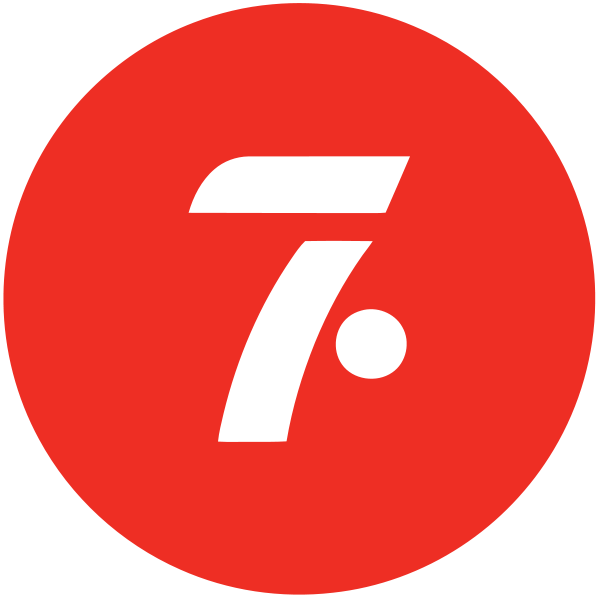
6 February 2012 to 14 February 2014

14 February 2014 to 5 May 2014

== Telenovelas ==
- La Tempestad (February 14-April 21, 2014)
- Mentir para Vivir (February 14-April 22, 2014)
- Destilando Amor (February 17-May 5, 2014; Canceled)
- Teresa (February 17-May 5, 2014; Canceled)
- Mi Pecado (February 17-May 5, 2014; Canceled)
- Rosalinda (March 31-May 5, 2014; Canceled)
- Porque el Amor Manda (February 14-May 5, 2014; Canceled)
- La madrastra (February 17-May 5, 2014; Canceled)
