= Sobremesa =

Spanish tradition

Sobremesa (Spanish: "upon the table") is the Spanish tradition of relaxing at the table after a meal.

During sobremesa, conversation is freely had. Depending on the habits of the area or country in question, coffee, tea, or a small liqueur or aguardiente (in a shot glass) is generally served, or a cigar may be smoked.

The 'sobremesa hour' is one of Spain's main TV primetimes.
