= Telecinco Sport =

- Country: Spain
- Broadcast area: Nationwide

Programming
- Language: Spanish
- Picture format: 576i (SDTV)

Ownership
- Owner: Gestevisión Telecinco
- Sister channels: Telecinco, Telecinco Estrellas

History
- Launched: 30 November 2005
- Closed: 17 February 2008
- Replaced by: Telecinco 2

Links
- Website: telecinco.es/sport

Availability

Terrestrial
- Digital: Mux 69

Telecinco Sport was a Spanish sport channel available on TDT, and owned by Gestevisión Telecinco.

On 18 February 2008, the channel was closed, and the frequency was given to Telecinco 2.

== Programming ==
Programmes of Telecinco Sport were provided by Eurosport News, that provided news bulletins related to national and international sporting events in a schedule between 7.30 a.m. and 1 a.m. Initially it transmitted sport news every 15 minutes, and repeats of Formula One races and Superbikes
