= Ana del Rey =

Spanish actress

- Born: 6 April 1985 (age 41); Alicante, Spain
- Other name: Anita del Rey
- Occupation: Actress
- Website: anitadelrey.com

Ana del Rey (born 6 April 1985), also known as Anita del Rey, is a Spanish television, film, and stage actress known for her roles in La pecera de Eva, El tiempo entre costuras, Muñecas, and Acacias 38.

== Biography ==
Del Rey was born in Alicante, Valencia, Spain. She worked in productions of the musical Hoy No Me Puedo Levantar, and had minor roles in the TV series' Un paso adelante, Arrayán, and Bicho malo (nunca muere) before landing the role as Olivia Gómez in La pecera de Eva. Since 2015, Del Rey has played one of the main characters, Trini Crespo, in the long-running Spanish TV drama Acacias 38, which attracts over 1 million viewers.

Del Rey has appeared on stage in Nacho López' comedy Elige tu propio bankero alongside Virginia Rodríguez and Wanda Obreke.

== Filmography ==
- Un paso adelante (2003, TV series)
- Arrayán (2009, TV series)
- Bicho malo (nunca muere) (2009, TV series)
- La pecera de Eva (2010–11, TV series)
- Rotos (2012, short)
- The Time in Between (2013–14, El tiempo entre costuras)
- Sue (2015, short)
- Ánima (2015, TV series short)
- Executive (2015, short)
- Fuera de foco (2015)
- Acacias 38 (2015–19, TV series)
- Muñecas (2016, TV series short)
- Telepasión: Va de cine (2016, TV special)
