= Eva Marcela Rodriguez =

Television anchor

- Born: Monterrey, Mexico
- Occupations: Presenter; TV personality; talk show host; sport presenter; broadcast journalist

Eva Marcela Rodriguez is a television anchor originally from Mexico. She works with various international media outlets including CNN, beIN Sports, TV Azteca, and Mexican TV public news. She is known for her work hosting for La Liga, and other Association sport-related TV broadcasts.

== Career ==
Eva Marcela Rodriguez was born in Monterrey, Mexico. She started studying dance professionally at 9 years of age at the Institute of Fine Arts (Mexico). In 2004, she started working as a broadcast journalist and radio announcer. In 2005 she worked as a TV host in TV Azteca Noreste (Azteca7). She later became the host and producer of two radio shows, and was later promoted to head anchor of the Daily Morning News. In 2008 she worked on Ganamania, an interactive game show produced by Azteca Mexico TV. She was later selected as the host of an interactive TV show produced by ProSiebenSat.1 and TV Azteca. In 2014, Rodriguez was hired by Bein Sport USA as a television host. In 2016, she presented La Liga Awards, which was broadcast in more than 180 countries. She is currently collaborating with Gol Televisión and beIN Sports in Spain.

== Education ==
Rodriguez attended the National Institute of Fine Arts in 2003. In 2005 she obtained a bachelor's degree in Information Services and Communications from University of Monterrey. In 2010 she received a master's degree in Communications and Media from Universidad Complutense de Madrid in Spain.

== Personal life ==
Rodriguez currently resides in Miami, Florida, United States.
