= CNN+ (TV network) =

1999–2010 Spanish news channel

- Country: Spain
- Broadcast area: Nationwide
- Headquarters: Tres Cantos

Programming
- Language: Spanish
- Picture format: 576i (4:3 SDTV)

Ownership
- Owner: Time Warner; Sogecable
- Sister channels: CNN en Español

History
- Launched: 27 January 1999; 27 years ago
- Closed: 28 December 2010; 15 years ago
- Replaced by: On DTT: Gran Hermano 24 horas (28 December 2010 – 1 March 2011); Divinity (1 March 2011–present)

Availability

Terrestrial
- Digital: Mux 67

CNN+ (CNN Plus) was a Spanish 24-hour television news channel. Launched in 1999 as a joint venture by Sogecable (a subsidiary of Prisa) and Turner Broadcasting System (a unit of Time Warner which owned CNN), it went off the air at the end of 28 December 2010. The management announced that CNN+ would be closed on 31 December 2010 because of low ratings and financial losses.

The slogan was Está pasando, lo estás viendo (It's happening, you're watching it). By 2008, there were other 24-hour television channels — Intereconomía TV and TVE 24h — and CNN+ was no longer the audience leader in this type of general information. Also, CNN+'s ratings were low, peaking at 0.6%.

On 18 December 2009, the channels of Sogecable, a Prisa business, merged into the Gestevisión Telecinco, which already controlled Spain's Telecinco channel.

The channel went off the air at 11:59 p.m. (Spanish time) on 28 December 2010. On digital terrestrial television (DTT), it was temporarily replaced with Gran Hermano 24 horas, a television channel dedicated to the 24-hour coverage of the reality show Gran Hermano, the Spanish version of Big Brother franchise (see also Gran Hermano (Spanish season 12)). This channel was in turn replaced by Divinity on 1 March 2011.
