= Lists of Spanish-language television channels =

The following articles contain lists of Spanish-language television channels:

- Television in Latin America
- List of Mexican television networks
- List of Spanish-language television networks in the United States
- Television in Spain
