= Vértice 360 =

Spanish entertainment company

- Company type: Subsidiary
- Industry: Entertainment
- Founded: October 2006; 19 years ago
- Headquarters: Calle Agastia, 80, Madrid, Spain
- Services: Distribution; production
- Owner: Squirrel Capital
- Parent: Squirrel Media

Vértice 360 is a Spanish audiovisual production and distribution company. It is a division of Squirrel Media.

== History ==
Vértice 360 (also Vértice 360º) was created in October 2006 from Telson, and consisted of 17 assets including Videoreport, Manga Films, Telespan and Notro Films. Notro Films' president José María Irisarri then assumed executive chairman duties. Around the time of its stock exchange entry in December 2007, Avanzit owned a 43% of the capital.

In 2009, Vértice 360º merged Manga Films and Notro Films to create the distribution label Vértice Cine.

In 2011, Irisarri announced his resignation due to disagreements with major shareholder Ezentis, the new brand identity of Avanzit. (Note: Avanzit renamed to Ezentis in 2010.) Vértice 360 filed for voluntary insolvency proceedings in 2014.

In 2016, Ezentis agreed to divest its shareholding in the company and sell its 25.4% share of stocks to Squirrel Inversiones.

In 2021, with Pablo Pereiro Lage as the CEO and chairman, Vértice 360 was renamed to Squirrel Media (self-billed as a company dedicated to "Advertising, Media, Contents and Audiovisual Services"); the name Vértice 360 was restricted from then on to the production and distribution businesses of the company.

== Film releases ==
2020s

Vértice 360 films released in the 2020s
Release date (Note: The listed date refers to the film's theatrical release in Spain by Vértice 360, not necessarily its first screening or when it premiered.)	Title	Director(s)	Ref.
21 May 2021	Polyamory for Dummies	Fernando Colomo	
10 December 2021	Wetland	Iñaki Sánchez Arrieta	
18 February 2022	Mothering Sunday	Eva Husson	
7 October 2022	On the Fringe	Juan Diego Botto	
17 November 2023	The Hunger Games: The Ballad of Songbirds & Snakes	Francis Lawrence	
24 May 2024	Stories	Paco Sepúlveda	
14 June 2024	Mothers' Instinct	Benoît Delhomme	
20 September 2024	Ellipsis	David Marqués	
11 October 2024	Strange Darling	J.T. Mollner	
9 May 2025	Enemies	David Valero	
3 October 2025	Hidden Murder	Antonio Hernández	
21 November 2025	Dracula	Luc Besson	
