= Audiovisual Sport =

Audiovisual Sport (AVS) was a Spanish company dedicated to "buy, manage, exploit and administer Spanish football Liga and Copa del Rey rights."

The company was created in 1997 as a joint venture of the three main soccer TV rights owners in Spain, namely Sogecable (40%), Telefónica de Contenidos (a subsidiary of Telefónica) (40%), and the Catalan government TV network (Corporació Catalana de Mitjans Audiovisuals, or CCMA) (20%). AVS enjoyed a monopoly on Spanish soccer rights, which caused an investigation by the European Commission, cleared in 2003.

In 2003 Sogecable bought Telefónica's stake, therefore increasing its share to 80%.

In 2007 a row erupted between AVS and the other main owner of Spanish soccer rights, namely Mediapro.
