= Sogecuatro =

Spanish media company

Sociedad General de Televisión Cuatro, S.A.U
- Company type: Sociedad Anónima Unipersonal
- Founded: February 12, 2010
- Defunct: June 21, 2011
- Fate: Merged
- Headquarters: Tres Cantos, Spain
- Services: Television broadcasting
- Parent: Mediaset España Comunicación

Sociedad General de Televisión Cuatro, S.A.U. (Sogecuatro) was a Spanish media company that operated the Spanish television channel Cuatro. It operated as a subsidiary of the audiovisual division (Sogecable) of the Spanish media conglomerate PRISA.

On May 28, 2010, the Council of Ministers authorised the transfer of the broadcasting license from Sogecable to their subsidiary.

On December 28, 2010, parent company PRISA TV sold Sogecuatro to Gestevisión Telecinco, now known as Mediaset España Comunicación, for 485 million euros and a 17.3% stake in the buying company.
