= Paolo Vasile =

Italian businessman and producer

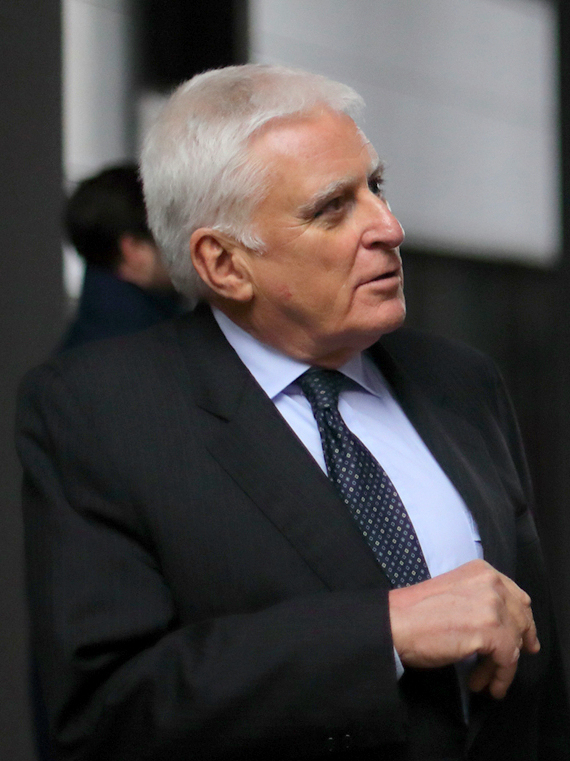
- Vasile on 1 March 2018
- Born: 23 June 1953; Rome
- Occupation: Composer
- Father: Turi Vasile

Paolo Vasile (born 1953) is an Italian businessman and film and television producer. He was the CEO of Gestevisión Telecinco/Mediaset España from 1999 to 2022.

== Biography ==
Born in Rome in 1953, Vasile was the last of four siblings, son to producer, screenwriter, director, author and critic Turi Vasile and Silvana Gualdi. He studied Anthropology and worked as film producer for ten years.

An acquaintance of media tycoon Silvio Berlusconi since the early 1980s, Vasile switched cinema for television, reportedly encouraged by his wife Ana Lisa. He became deputy director general of Mediaset and responsible for the production facilities of the company in Rome.

Berlusconi sent him to Spain in 1998 in order to get Telecinco back on track, becoming Berlusconi's right-hand man in Spain. After Vasile was appointed CEO of Gestevisión Telecinco (later Mediaset España) on 30 March 1999, Telecinco consolidated as the leading TV channel in Spain in terms of viewership. He led the company when it went public in 2004 and during the merging deal agreement with PRISA.

After the runaway success of Gran Hermano in 2000, Vasile started to modify Telecinco's programming to focus more on reality shows and tabloid journalism. While this was popular and helped Telecinco win regular ratings battles, it turned him into a figurehead for the rise of the so-called telebasura ("trash TV") in Spain. Former presenters such as Paula Vázquez, who was unexpectedly ordered to leave the network by Vasile in 2002, and well-known weatherman Mario Picazo, who was removed when Vasile decided to outsource Telecinco's weather forecasts in 2008, also complained of his ruthless management techniques.

In 2022, amid consistently decreasing viewership figures and being beaten in the ratings by Antena 3 for the first time, Vasile left his position at Mediaset España after 23 years. After his departure, Telecinco renovated its programming to focus less on tabloid-style chat and reinvent itself as a family-friendly and public service network, with mixed results.
