= La Tienda en Casa =

- Country: Spain

Programming
- Language(s): Spanish

History
- Launched: 1 April 2011 (original); 7 May 2014 (relaunch)
- Closed: 31 December 2012 (original)
- Former names: Canal Club (September 2007-April 1, 2011); Nueve (January 21, 2013-May 6, 2014)

Links
- Website: www.latiendaencasa.es

Availability

Terrestrial
- Digital: MUX 2

La Tienda en Casa (literally The Shop At Home) is a home-shopping channel run by department store El Corte Inglés and is broadcast in Spain. Available through satellite and cable, it broadcasts recorded infomercials in the Spanish language 24 hours a day. In addition to the channel, La Tienda en Casa also broadcasts some shorter infomercials during the day on nationally available Spanish networks.
