= Eva Arguiñano =

Spanish chef and television presenter (born 1960)

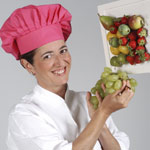
- Born: 4 April 1960 (age 66); Beasain, Gipuzkoa, Spain
- Culinary career
- Television show: Hoy cocinas tú
- Website: http://www.hoycocinastu.com

Eva Arguiñano (born 4 April 1960) is a Spanish chef and television presenter.

She is the sister of Karlos Arguiñano and began working for him in his restaurant and television shows. Since 27 March 2006 she has presented Hoy cocinas tú ('You're cooking today') on the Spanish network laSexta. She has published several cookbooks, mainly about desserts.

== Life ==
Eva started working in the kitchen at 16 years old, as an assistant pastry chef, along with her brother. After studying several training courses cooking, she managed to improve her technique, focusing on pastries, and later became head pastry chef, at a restaurant opened by her father.

She made her television debut in 1991 in the TVE program "cuisine every day", which featured her brother, taking care of related dessert recipes, and remained in the following seasons. In 1998, coinciding with a temporary stay of his brother in Argentina, she participated in the program "Telecinco kitchen", and then again coincided with Karlos Arguiñano Karlos program "in your kitchen," Channel Thirteen of the Andean country.

In 2006 she got her own program on the television channel La Sexta, presenting "Today your kitchens", a program in which she depicted a person how to develop a menu that will later perform properly for their invitation. Eva remained at the forefront until 2009; the program also presented in the same channel, "temptations of Eve" (2007).

During the years 2009 and 2010, she conducted several special programs for television "Hogarutil as Eve" and "Christmas with Enrique" (with Enrique Fleischmann) or "Breakfast and snacks Eva Arguiñano". Between 2011 and 2013s, he presented a culinary reality show called "Kitchen with new feeling".

On 18 April 2013 the confectioner was admitted to the intensive care unit of the Donostia Hospital in San Sebastian, after suffering a heart attack. A week later she was transferred to the Polyclinic in the same city, where she recovered from heart surgery.
