= Cuatro (TV channel) =

Spanish television channel

- Country: Spain
- Broadcast area: Spain and Andorra, reaching bordering regions via overspill of the Spanish terrestrial network
- Headquarters: Madrid

Programming
- Language: Spanish
- Picture format: 1080i HDTV

Ownership
- Owner: Mediaset España (MFE - MediaForEurope)
- Sister channels: Telecinco; Factoría de Ficción; Boing; Divinity; Energy; Be Mad

History
- Launched: 7 November 2005; 21 years ago
- Founder: PRISA
- Replaced: Canal+ (analogue television)

Links
- Website: www.cuatro.com

Availability

Terrestrial
- Digital terrestrial television: Mux 25 (Madrid); Mux 34 (Barcelona); Mux 36 (Andorra); Mux 29 (Gibraltar)

Streaming media
- Mediaset Infinity: Watch live

Cuatro (stylized as cuatro°, "Four") is a Spanish free-to-air television channel that was launched in November 2005. Owned by Mediaset España, it is broadcast on TV frequencies licensed to the previous owner PRISA TV in 1990 and previously used by them for the analogue transmission of their subscription channel Canal+.

== History ==
In 1990, Canal+ began broadcasting in Spain, however, due to their license conditions, they could only broadcast six hours on free-to-air television, while accessing the programming for the rest of the day required payment of a monthly fee. 15 years later, Sogecable, the company that owned the channel at that time, began efforts to change its transmission licence and be able to broadcast 24 hours a day for free. In July 2005, the Government of Spain approved the request.

On November 7, 2005, at 8:44 p.m., Cuatro began broadcasting, replacing Canal+. After the launch program Nace Cuatro, the first edition of Noticias Cuatro followed.

In 2006, Cuatro scored a massive coup by striking a deal with the Royal Spanish Football Federation and Spain's national football team, allowing it to show all of the team's matches, and it also agreed with rival channel LaSexta to share the rights to broadcast the games of general interest in the 2006 FIFA World Cup. It snatched this licence from TVE, who had held the rights to the national team's matches for years. In 2008, together with satellite platform Canal+, owned by the same company, Cuatro secured the rights to broadcast the UEFA Euro 2008 championship, scoring the highest ratings in the history of Spanish television (since 1992). The two broadcasters also won rights to broadcast matches of the 2010 FIFA World Cup.

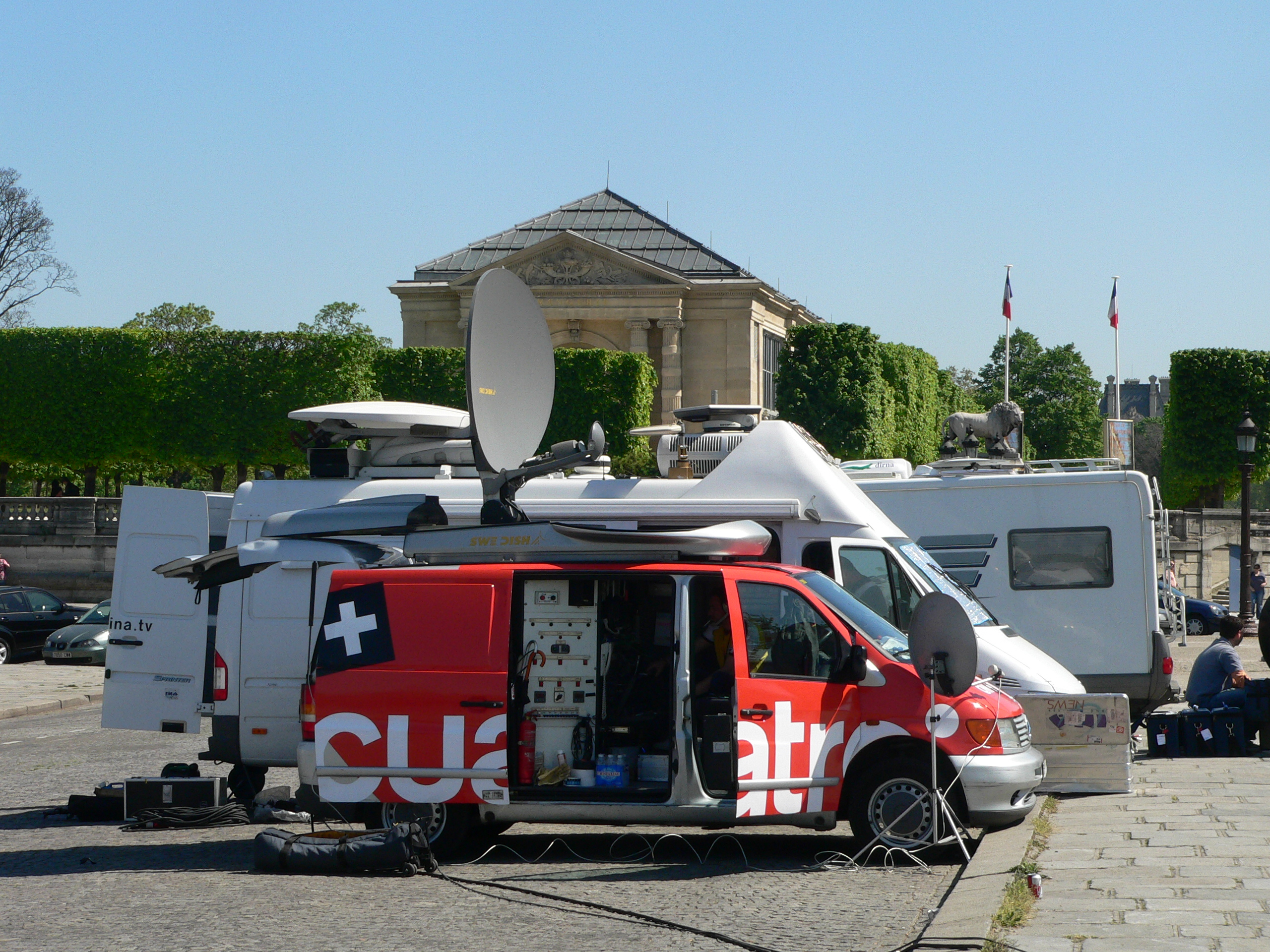
Cuatro mobile unit in Paris.

On 18 December 2009, Mediaset, the controlling shareholder of Mediaset España and PRISA, proprietor of PRISA TV, presented an agreement to merge their television channels (Telecinco and Cuatro). After the merger, Cuatro and its broadcasting licence Sogecable separated, and the company - Sogecuatro - was purchased in full by Mediaset España. Along with this act, PRISA bought newly issued shares of Mediaset España, 18% of the equity of this company. This agreement makes Mediaset España the largest television network in Spain by audience share. In total the group has a total of seven channels, in Terrestrial Television in Spain: Telecinco, Cuatro, LaSiete, Factoría De Ficción, Boing, Canal+Dos, CNN+, Telecinco HD and Canal Club.

The president of the resulting string (which will keep the brands and editorial of both chains) is Alejandro Echevarria, with two CEOs who are Paolo Vasile (Contents) and Giuseppe Tringali (Advertising). PRISA also has two CEOs and holds the vice presidency of the operator.

Before this agreement, formalized the entry of Mediaset in the shareholding of Canal+, with 22% of the shares.

== Programming ==
Cuatro's programming is general, however, it is mainly aimed at a male audience, which is why the spaces for information, sports, entertainment and reality shows stand out, as well as films and series. Since the merger with Telecinco, the channel has become the group's second in importance, so its programming is more experimental and alternative, intending to compete Atresmedia's LaSexta. Occasionally the channel also broadcasts some live events such as sports or news coverage.

Cuatro programming includes Supermax, Las mañanas de Cuatro, Cuarto milenio, Tulli, La Liga, 9-1-1, SpongeBob SquarePants, Siren and Castle.

== Production ==
Cuatro currently broadcasts in 16:9 for most of the programmes, but in 4:3 for a minority of programming including films and older TV series.
