= Mediaset Infinity (Spain) =

Spanish video streaming service

- Official logo
- Website type: Streaming media
- Available in: Spanish
- Area served: Spain
- Founder: Mediaset España
- Editor: Telecinco
- Products: TV programs
- Parent: Mediaset España
- Website: www.mediasetinfinity.es
- Commercial: Yes
- Launched: November 16, 2011; 14 years ago
- Current status: Active

Mediaset Infinity (formerly Mitele) is a Spanish streaming platform for viewing streaming content via the Internet, both live and on demand. The platform is published by Telecinco and owned by Mediaset.

It is also available as an app for Android, iOS and for Smart TVs with MHP or HbbTV technology.

== History ==
Following the completion of the merger of Gestevisión Telecinco and Sogecuatro in January 2011, in November of the same year, Mediaset España announced the launch of Mitele, the audiovisual group's streaming platform featuring content from all its networks, including programs, series, films, miniseries, movies, news, sports, documentaries, and music, as well as the 24-hour Big Brother channel during the contest months. It also has the exclusive channels Fun, Unplugged, and Wala!, the former broadcasting a compilation of the best comedy content aired on Mediaset; the latter, series and programs that made history for the audiovisual group; and the third, content aimed at children and young people.

In May 2025, Mediaset announced that Mitele would be renamed Mediaset Infinity, following its Italian counterpart, starting June 24.

== Infinity+ ==
Infinity+

Infinity+ (formerly Mitele Plus) is the paid offer of Mediaset Infinity.

Available as a subscription, it allows you to watch the exclusive content of the platform.

== Logos ==
Mitele 2011-2025

Mediaset Infinity 2025–present

== See also ==
- Mediaset España
- Mediaset Group
- Telecinco
