= Squirrel Capital =

Spanish holding company

- Type: Private
- Industry: audio-visual and advertising
- Founded: 2003; 23 years ago
- Founder: Pablo Pereiro Lage
- Headquarters: Madrid, Spain
- Subsidiaries: Squirrel Media
- Website: squirrelcapital.es

Squirrel Capital is a Spanish audio-visual and advertising group founded in 2003. It is the owner of Squirrel Media (previously Vértice 360) which was acquired by the holding in 2016.

== History ==
Squirrel Capital was founded by Pablo Pereiro Lage in September 2003 as a holding company focused on communication, real estate, and professional services.

In 2013 Squirrel Capital entered the Italian market with two new companies: Best Option Media Italia and Best Option Products Italia.

In 2016, his company Squirrel Capital acquired a 25% stake in Vértice 360, an audiovisual production and distribution company founded in October 2006 from Telson, and consisted of 17 assets including Videoreport, Manga Films, Telespan and Notro Films. It was undergoing insolvency proceedings. In a year, the company get out of bankruptcy, was again listed on the stock market, and signed film distribution contracts with national and international producers.

In 2019, he continued working in media sector and added the theme TV channels Nautical Channel, Horse TV or Class TV.

In September 2021, Vértice 360 was rebranded as Squirrel Media, and its ticker on the Madrid Stock Exchange became SQRL. His company acquired production companies Grupo Ganga, known for the series Cuéntame cómo pasó, La Comercial, which produces Madrileños por el mundo, BF Distribution, the film distributor in Latin America, and OTT platform CanalDeporte. His company also initiated the acquisition of Mondo TV Studios.

In 2024, Squirrel Media acquired IKI Group, an advertising group in Spain, and Design Thinking Sweden, followed by the acquisition of The Hook in summer of the same year.

Squirrel Media manages the distribution business of Squirrel Capital, including properties released under the label Vértice 360.
