= Gestora de Inversiones Audiovisuales La Sexta =

Gestora de Inversiones Audiovisuales La Sexta, S.A
- Company type: Sociedad Anónima
- Industry: Media
- Founded: July 21, 2005
- Defunct: October 1, 2012
- Fate: Acquired by Grupo Antena 3
- Headquarters: Barcelona; Madrid
- Key people: Emilio Aragón (Chairman); José Miguel Contreras (CEO)
- Products: laSexta, Gol Televisión
- Number of employees: 650

Gestora de Inversiones Audiovisuales La Sexta, S.A. was a Spanish television production company that operated the Spanish terrestrial television channel laSexta.

In 2012, the channel was acquired by Grupo Antena 3.

== Ownership ==
- 51% GAMP (Grupo Audiovisual de Medios de Producción), made up of:
  - 69.95% Grupo Árbol-Globomedia (Emilio Aragón) and Mediapro
  - 9.8% Bilbao Bizkaia Kutxa (Basque bank)
  - 8.25% El Terrat (Andreu Buenafuente)
  - 12% Bainet (Karlos Arguiñano)
- 40% Televisa (a Mexican media conglomerate)
- 9% smaller investors such as Gala Capital George Soros
