= Be Mad =

Private Spanish entertainment television channel

- Country: Spain
- Broadcast area: Spain
- Headquarters: Madrid

Programming
- Language(s): Spanish
- Picture format: 1080i HDTV

Ownership
- Owner: Mediaset España
- Sister channels: Telecinco; Cuatro; Factoría de Ficción; Divinity; Energy; Boing

History
- Launched: 21 April 2016

Links
- Website: www.bemad.es

Availability

Terrestrial
- DVB-T: Check local frequencies

Streaming media
- Mediaset Infinity: Direct

Be Mad is a Spanish free television channel, belonging to Mediaset España and was launched on 21 April 2016. Its programming is cinema and film.

== History ==
In October 2015, Mediaset España was announced as one of the winning companies of a high definition digital terrestrial television license. Initially, the owner company transmitted HD versions of the Boing and Energy channels on that signal. In March 2016, it was announced that this signal would be occupied by a new channel called Be Mad, which finally began broadcasting on 21 April 2016.

== Programming ==
Between April 2016 and August 2022 the channel's programming was based on topics related to sports, adventure and action. There were several programmatic blocks in which the different contents of the channel were categorized: Be Mad Travel, Be Mad Nature, Be Mad Mechanic, Be Mad Planet, Be Mad Investigation, Be Mad Extreme, Be Mad Food, Be Mad Live!, Be Mad History, Be Mad Movies, Be Mad Science, Be Mad Mystery and Be Mad Sports. Most of the channel's programming was based on content that had previously been broadcast on Telecinco or Cuatro, which met the thematic criteria related to the Be Mad's idea.

As of September 2022, the programming of Be Mad was reformed, so it became a channel dedicated to cinema, taking advantage of the agreements that Mediaset España has with various production companies such as Walt Disney Pictures, Sony Pictures, Universal Pictures, Warner Bros. or StudioCanal, in addition to the films made by Telecinco Cinema. Some of the programmes of Be Mad include: Be Mad Stars: The Thin Red Line, Be Mad Stars: The Impossible, Action Mad: Behind The Enemy Line.
