= Paramount Network (Spain) =

Defunct Spanish free-to-air television network

- Paramount Network's final logo as of 2025
- Broadcast area: Spain, Andorra
- Headquarters: Madrid, Spain

Programming
- Picture format: 1080i HDTV

Ownership
- Owner: Paramount Networks EMEAA
- Sister channels: MTV; Comedy Central; Nickelodeon

History
- Launched: March 30, 2012; 14 years ago
- Closed: December 31, 2025; 6 months ago
- Replaced by: Pluto TV (on Streaming Services); Squirrel Dos (on DTT)
- Former names: Paramount Channel (2012–2018)

Links
- Website: http://paramountnetwork.es

Paramount Network (formerly Paramount Channel) was a Spanish free-to-air television network primarily programmed in a general entertainment format. The terrestrial license was held by Net TV. It was originally launched on March 30, 2012, as Paramount Channel, primarily broadcasting films from the 1980s and 1990s, as well as recent television series.

In May 2018, Viacom announced that the Spanish version of the channel would relaunch as Paramount Network (itself a relaunch of the former U.S. network Spike) on 10 June 2018, switching to a general entertainment format with television series and films.

On January 18, 2024 it was announced Paramount Network Spain would upgrade from its 576i resolution to 1080i on February 14, 2024, due to the shutdown of SD signals on terrestrial television in Spain on that same day.

Paramount Network logo without the mountain, used until April 2025

On October 22, 2025 it was announced that Paramount Network would shut down in Spain on December 31, as part of a global adjustment program by Paramount Skydance Corporation. In response to this, a version of Paramount Network was launched on Pluto TV Spain on December 1, 2025. On 1 January 2026, the channel ceased broadcasting at midnight. On DTT, its frequencies were then taken over by Squirrel Dos.

== Final programming ==
- Agatha Christie's Miss Marple
- Agatha Christie's Poirot
- Alaska y Mario
- Alice Nevers
- Atrapa a un ladrón
- Candice Renoir
- Cazatesoros
- Central de cómicos
- Charmed
- Cinexpress
- Columbo
- Diagnosis: Murder
- Don Matteo
- Endeavour
- Father Brown
- Fotogramas TV
- The Fresh Prince of Bel-Air
- Gotham
- Grantchester
- Houdini & Doyle
- Informe criminal
- La Señora
- The Librarians
- Little House on the Prairie
- Los vecinos en guerra
- Los crímenes de Cassandre
- Man in an Orange Shirt
- Mary Higgins Clark
- Midsomer Murders
- Miss Fisher's Murder Mysteries
- MovieBerto
- Murder, She Wrote
- Murdoch Mysteries
- NCIS: Los Angeles
- NCIS: New Orleans
- Papel pintado
- Pata negra
- Peliculeros
- Scorpion
- Section de recherches
- Sherlock
- Un passo dal cielo
- Waco
- Yellowstone
