= Boing (Spanish TV channel) =

Spanish children's television channel

- Country: Spain
- Broadcast area: Spain, reaching bordering regions via overspill of the Spanish terrestrial network
- Network: Telecinco

Programming
- Language: Spanish
- Picture format: 1080i HDTV

Ownership
- Owner: Mediaset España (50%); Skydance Corporation (50%)
- Sister channels: List: Mediaset España Telecinco Cuatro Divinity Energy Factoría de Ficción Skydance Corporation Warner TV Spain TCM CNN International

History
- Launched: 28 November 2008; 17 years ago (as a programming block); 1 September 2010; 16 years ago (as a channel)

Links
- Website: www.boing.es

Availability

Terrestrial
- Digital terrestrial television: Channels may vary

Boing is a Spanish free-to-air television channel launched in 2010 and owned as a joint venture of Mediaset España and Skydance Corporation through its International unit. When Cartoonito and Cartoon Network were shut down on 30 June 2013, Boing became their primary channel, alongside new Boomerang programmes. Some series on the channel are also available in English via a secondary audio feed.

Additional Boing feeds are available in Italy and Sub-Saharan Africa, with Cartoon Network, Cartoonito and Boomerang also available in those territories.

== History of Boing Spain ==
Programming block logo (2008–2010)

On 28 November 2008, Telecinco and Turner, reached an agreement to introduce a children's programming block on the Telecinco channel, with some 42 hours of weekly programming. Three days later, the Boing drawing container began in Telecinco and Telecinco 2.

Months later, on 11 May 2009, Boing went from Telecinco 2 to Factoría de Ficción, of the same group, with the same content and similar schedules, since Telecinco 2 became La Siete and changed part of its programming.

On 2 August 2010, Telecinco announced the launch of Boing as its fourth free-to-air television channel, moving from a series container to an open-themed channel. It would be dedicated 24 hours a day to the youngest in the house, with Turner star products. In its first weeks of broadcasting, Boing offered a six-hour programming loop that hosted the animated series Geronimo Stilton, Beyblade: Metal Fusion, Dinosaur King, Powerpuff Girls Z, Ben 10: Alien Force, Bakugan Battle Brawlers and Inazuma Eleven. In the followings weeks, it incorporated progressively fictional content aimed at children and adolescent viewers.

On 9 August 2010, it began its test broadcasts showing a letter of adjustment and on 23 August a promotional loop of series that would be broadcast in its premiere on 1 September of the same year.

Logo 2010–2011

On 1 September 2010, its official broadcasts began with a programme that included a welcome selection of the Turner factory's star products. Telecinco's new children's channel premiered with a 0.58% quota. With the arrival of the new channel, Boing, the series container of Telecinco and Factoría de Ficción was renamed SuperBoing. On 1 January 2011, it ceased broadcasting on both channels, after the merger with Cuatro. Its contents were shown exclusively on the Boing channel.

On 28 November 2010, the channel premiered La gran película de Ed, Edd y Eddy, an animated film from the series Ed, Edd n Eddy. Although its official release had been one year and 22 days earlier (6 November 2009) on the private and pay-TV network Cartoon Network, it was the first film broadcast on Boing and the first feature of a previous series broadcast on the network.

On 31 May 2011, the cable operator ONO incorporated the Boing channel in its basic package (which already had 17 children's channels) on dial 64, so all subscribers to the operator have access to that channel.

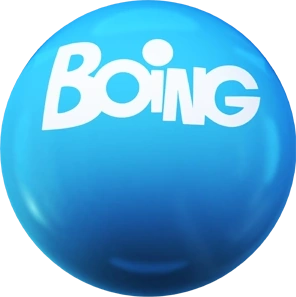
Logo 2011–2016

On 20 June 2011, Boing's creative and advertising group, Time Warner and Publiespaña, changed the channel's corporate image with new advertising blocks, adding animated curtains in the presentation of the series and more information. The logo was also modified to a darker tone and with a spherical shape.

On 28 June 2011, Mediaset Spain announced that, from the fourth quarter of the year, Publiespaña would launch a commercial policy in the channel with Desayuna y merienda con Boing containers. Both are presented by the EVA robot.

On 16 August 2011, pay-TV operator Movistar TV added the Boing channel on its 63 dial. It later changed to 69 dial. In 2015 it became Movistar+, so it is now on 97 dial.

On 7 September 2011, Boing's official website renewed the content of the website, transforming it to its new corporate image and creating new sections. These sections include a games section, a series section, a video and photo portal and a blog where users are informed daily of the new releases that come to the channel.

On 16 September 2011, Grupo Zeta launched the first issue of Boing Magazine to the kiosks. After an agreement between Grupo Zeta and the communication groups Turner Broadcasting System and Mediaset España, the publication was born with the same drive as the young children's channel.

On Saturday, 4 February 2012, Mediaset Spain's children's channel reached its daily audience record with a 1.8% screen share, and was even one tenth (1.9%) away from Neox, Atresmedia's thematic channel. One month after making history, on 3 March of the same year, it obtained a 2% screen share, two tenths away from its main competitor Disney Channel (2.2%). Finally, weeks after reaching the daily maximum with a quota of 2.0%, on Saturday 14 April it repeated its success by giving the channel an audience share of 2.5% of the screen in total day and reaching the historic maximum since its premiere. Almost two months later, on 2 June, the children's channel of Mediaset Spain broke a new record on Saturday, giving the group a quota of 2.6% daily screen share.

In July 2012, Boing achieved the monthly maximum in DTT with a share of 2.1%, surpassing its great competitor Disney Channel by 3 tenths. The channel gets the best result of its history thanks to films such as Ice Age. In terms of audience, it is the second most watched channel among children from 4 to 12 years with a commercial target of 14.1%.

Since November 2015, one month after being awarded a new HD channel by the government, Mediaset broadcast Boing in HD temporarily until 7 January 2016 Being replaced by Energy HD, and this was replaced on 21 April by Be Mad TV, the new channel of Mediaset Spain.

Logo 2016–2020

On 29 March 2016, the channel renewed its corporate image, adapting to the worldwide image of the channel that premiered its Italian version on 7 March of the same year.

On 14 February 2024, it returned to HD broadcasting, this time definitively, as required by Royal Decree 16/2023 of 17 January, which forces all DTT channels to broadcast in high definition.

== See also ==
- Boing (Italy)
- Boing (Africa)
- Cartoon Network (Spain)
