= Energy (TV channel) =

- Country: Spain
- Broadcast area: Spain, reaching bordering regions via overspill of the Spanish terrestrial network

Programming
- Language: Spanish
- Picture format: 1080i HDTV

Ownership
- Owner: Mediaset España
- Sister channels: Telecinco; Cuatro; Factoría de Ficción; Boing; Divinity; Be Mad

History
- Launched: 9 January 2012; 14 years ago
- Replaced by: Canal+ 2

Links
- Website: www.energytv.es

Energy (Stylized as E.) is a private Spanish television channel owned by Mediaset España. Its programming is aimed towards a male audience. It began test broadcasts on 27 December 2011 before fully launching on 9 January 2012.

== History ==
In 2010, after the merger between Gestevisión Telecinco and Sogecuatro, the newly formed group was able to add two television channels to its offer, which would be occupied by a channel aimed at women and another at men. The first channel was called Divinity and it was launched in April 2011, while in the male case the project was frozen.

In November 2011, the group's men's channel project was revived with the announcement of two possible names for the channel: Vertigo and Energy. Finally the second name was chosen for the channel.

The channel began broadcasting on 9 January 2012, occupying the space of Canal+ 2, in its beginnings, the channel broadcast programming based on series, documentaries, reality shows, sports and movies.

In November 2015, the channel was reformed to focus on the transmission of television series.

In August 2022, the channel became the most watched in Spain with respect to thematic channels created to be broadcast in Digital Terrestrial Television, a position it has held since that moment. In the months of March, April, May and August 2023, Energy achieved its best audience record by obtaining 3.1% of the television share.

== Programming ==
Logo since 2012

Energy airs syndicated television series, both international and local, most of them reruns of series previously aired on sister channels Telecinco and Cuatro. Previously the channel also broadcast sports, news documentaries and movies.

In its beginnings the channel also dedicated its transmission of events like Grand Prix motorcycle racing, the UEFA European Football Championship, Copa del Rey, the UEFA Europa League and the UEFS Futsal Men's Championship; NBA basketball and the Ultimate Fighting Championship.

In November 2015, the channel was reformed to focus on the transmission of television series, especially from the US, this was due to the launch of Atreseries by Atresmedia and the low audience numbers achieved in the original format, the channel also added documentaries and films to its programming, although they were later transferred to other channels of Mediaset such as Be Mad or Cuatro.

Some of the series broadcast by Energy are: CSI Miami, CSI Las Vegas, CSI New York, Hawaii Five-0, Criminal Minds, The Rookie or FBI: Most Wanted.
