= Divinity (TV channel) =

- Country: Spain

Programming
- Language: Spanish
- Picture format: 1080i HDTV

Ownership
- Owner: Mediaset España
- Sister channels: Telecinco; Cuatro; Factoría de Ficción; Boing; Energy; Be Mad

History
- Launched: 1 March 2011
- Replaced: CNN+ and Gran Hermano 24 horas (on DTT)

Links
- Website: www.divinity.es

Divinity is a private Spanish television channel owned by Mediaset España, whose programming is aimed at women. Divinity began test broadcasts on 1 March 2011 before fully launching on 1 April 2011.

== LaNueve project ==
With the expansion of the number of channels in Spain in 2010, before the merger of Telecinco and Cuatro, Telecinco was considering launching a free channel dedicated to women. The channel would have been launched on 1 September 2010 as "LaNueve" (The Nine) corresponding to its logical channel number on digital terrestrial television.

Its programming would have included: current affairs, entertainment, fiction series and informative spaces for women.

A month after the announcement, Telecinco announced that the project was dropped and replaced by a children's channel, Boing.

The project was finally resumed and La Nueve started broadcasting on 2 January 2013. The programmes are mainly repeats of series previously shown on the other Mediaset channels, especially Telecinco and Divinity.

== Divinity ==
On 23 February 2011, several internet portals echoed the launch of two new channels by Telecinco, one for men and the other for women, which suggested the comeback of LaNueve.

The next day on 24 February 2011, Telecinco confirmed by a press release that a new channel aimed at women was to launch.

The new channel was named Divinity, with programming similar to that of LaNueve.

On 1 March 2011, Telecinco began test broadcasts of Divinity, before its launch on 1 April 2011. Divinity uses the channel space previously occupied by CNN+ on digital terrestrial television (DTT): between CNN+'s closure on 28 December 2010 and Divinity's launch on 1 March 2011, Gran Hermano 24 horas took its place (see also Gran Hermano (Spanish season 12)).
