= Mediaset España =

Spanish media company

Grupo Audiovisual Mediaset España Comunicación, S.A.U.

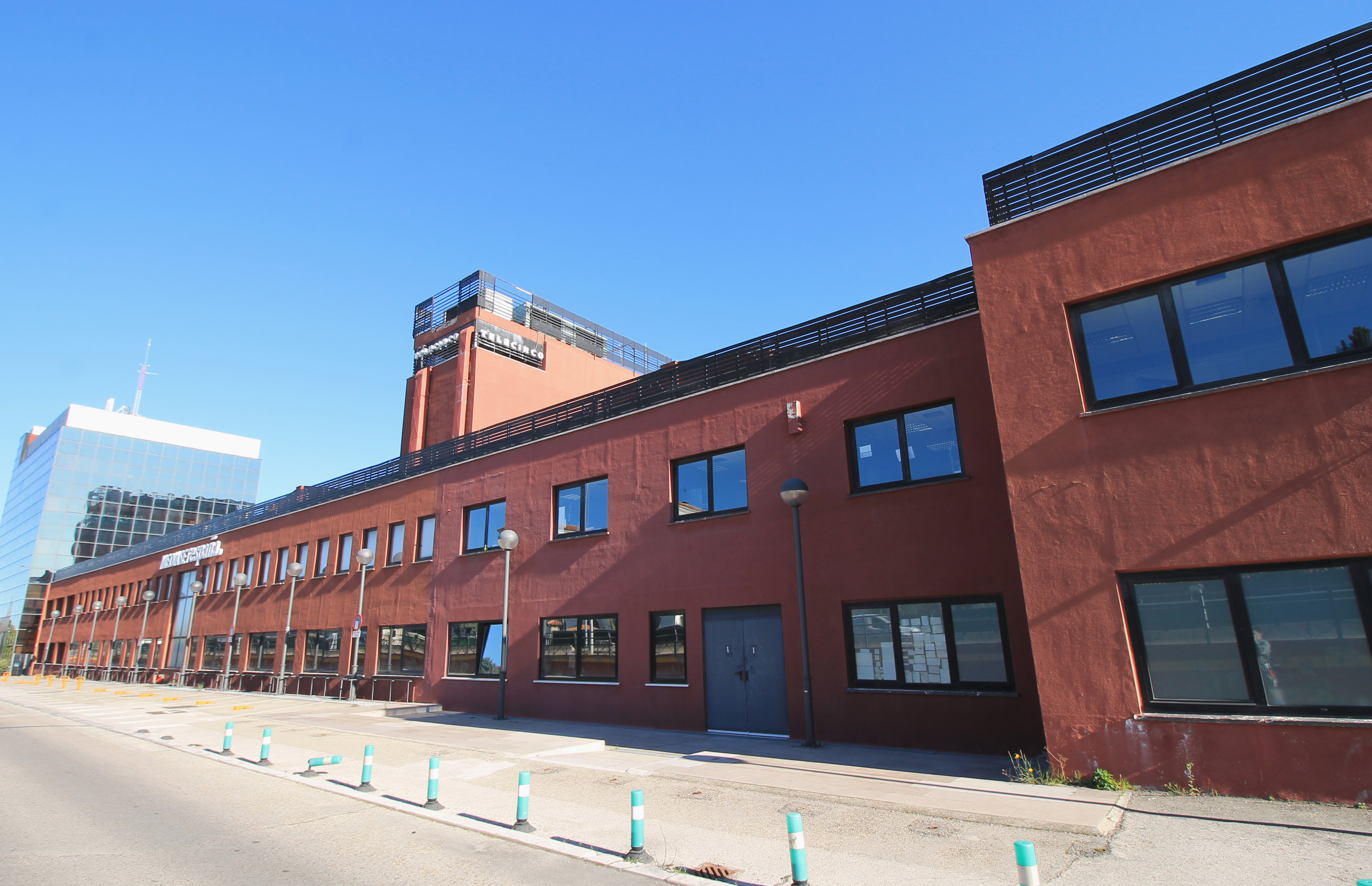
- Headquarters in Madrid
- Formerly: Gestevisión Telecinco, S.A. (1989–2011); Mediaset España Comunicación, S.A. (2011–2023)
- Type: Subsidiary
- Industry: Media
- Founded: 10 March 1989
- Headquarters: Fuencarral-El Pardo, Madrid, Spain
- Area served: Spain
- Key people: Cristina Garmendia (Chair); Alessandro Salem (CEO) (Advertising); Massimo Musolino (CEO Management & Operations)
- Products: Television and online content
- Revenue: ▲€957.89 million (2015)
- Operating income: ▼€766.74 million (2015)
- Net income: ▲€205.18 million (2015)
- Total assets: ▼€1.386 billion (2015)
- Total equity: ▼€1.069 billion (2015)
- Owner: Fininvest
- Number of employees: ▼1,266 (2015)
- Parent: MFE - MediaForEurope
- Subsidiaries: Telecinco Cinema; Publiespaña
- Website: www.mediaset.es

Grupo Audiovisual Mediaset España Comunicación, S.A.U. (formerly Gestevisión Telecinco, S.A. and Mediaset España Comunicación, S.A.) is a Spanish media company, controlled by MFE - MediaForEurope, which is majority-owned by Berlusconi family's Fininvest Group. Its divisions include the generalist free-to-air TV channels Telecinco and Cuatro, thematic channels and a film production subsidiary, Telecinco Cinema.

Created in 1989 as Gestevisión Telecinco, it was then granted one of the first licenses for private free-to-air analogic terrestrial TV broadcasting in Spain. In 2009, already in the TDT transition era, Gestevisión agreed with PRISA's Sogecuatro to merge their businesses (most notably their flagship channels Telecinco and Cuatro), with Gestevisión absorbing Sogecuatro in exchange of a minor participation of PRISA as shareholder of Gestevisión. In 2011, the media conglomerate was renamed to Mediaset España Comunicación PRISA eventually sold its remaining shares in 2015.

== History ==
=== 1989–1993: The early years ===
Gestevisión Telecinco was established on 10 March 1989, to participate in the government auction of broadcasting licenses announced by Felipe González's government following the Ley de Televisión Privada (Law of Commercial Television). Its first president was Germán Sánchez Ruipérez and, with a capital of 250 million pesetas, its shareholding was distributed as follows:

- Fininvest, presided by Silvio Berlusconi (25%);
- Divercisa, belonging to the Organización Nacional de Ciegos de España (ONCE), presided by Miguel Durán (25%);
- Sociedad Europea de Comunicación e Información (CECISA), belonging to Ediciones Anaya, presided by Germán Sánchez Ruipérez (25%);
- Juan Fernández Montreal, owner of Chocolates Trapa (15%);
- Promociones Calle Mayor, of the property developer Ángel Medrano Cuesta (10%).

On 25 August 1989 Gestevisión Telecinco, along with Antena 3 Televisión and PRISA TV, were issued a 10-year broadcasting license to operate a national, free-to-air, commercial television channel. On 3 March 1990 Tele5 (as it was known then) began its initial broadcast.

In 1997 Silvio Berlusconi's Mediaset Group acquired the majority of shares in Telecinco.

The main director of Atlas, Chema Baptist, added maximum responsibility of Telecinco's internet area and new business multiplatform to his duties. This decision was part of the company's policy of harnessing content creation and management in new technologies, and it took place immediately after the repurchase of 50% of his internet branch was finalised by Orange in 2001.

In 1998, after the arrival of Paolo Vasile as chief executive officer, Telecinco became more prominent in Spain. On 10 March 2000, the Spanish government renewed the concession for a further 10 years.

In 2003, Mediaset Group increased its stake in Telecinco and became the major shareholder with 50.1% of the shares. Gestevisión Telecinco was listed on the stock exchange on 24 June 2004.

In 2008, Gestevisión Telecinco entered the North American market with the acquisition of a 29.2% stake in Caribevision, an American broadcaster for the country's Spanish-speaking population.

=== 2009–present: Telecinco-Cuatro merger ===
On 18 December 2009, Mediaset, the controlling shareholder of Gestevisión Telecinco, and PRISA, parent company of Sogecable, presented an agreement to merge their television operations (Telecinco and Cuatro). Following this merger, Cuatro would be purchased in full by Telecinco. As part of the deal, PRISA would buy newly issued shares of Gestevisión Telecinco, giving it an 18% stake in the company.

This agreement made Gestevisión Telecinco the largest television network in Spain by audience share. In total the group would operate eight free-to-air channels: Telecinco, Cuatro, LaSiete, FactoríaDeFicción, LaNueve, CNN+ and CincoShop.

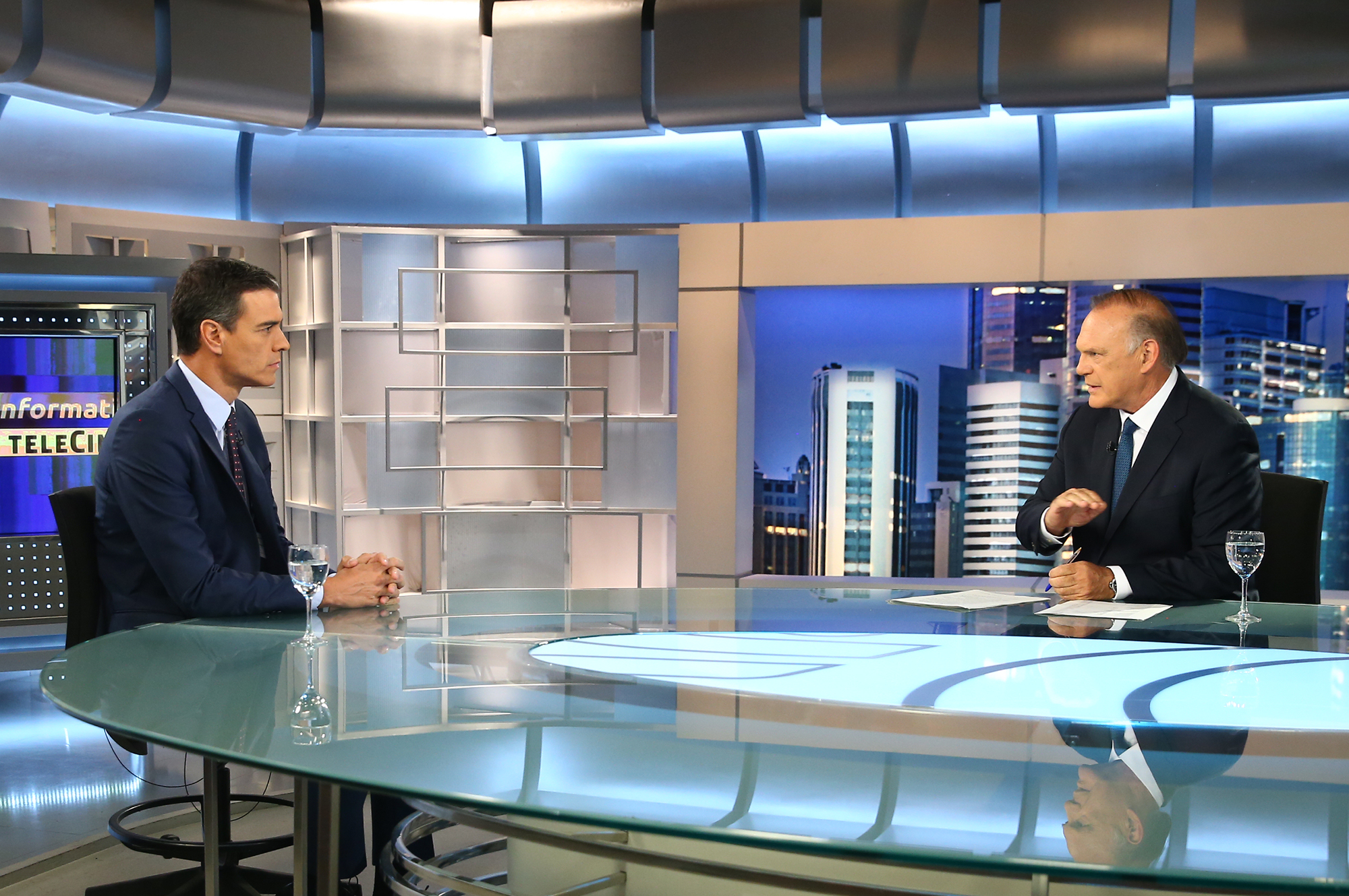
Pedro Piqueras interviewing Pedro Sánchez on Mediaset's flagship channel Telecinco (2019)

The board of directors of the enlarged Gestevisión Telecinco (which would keep the brands and editorial structure of both Telecinco and Cuatro) has Alejandro Echevarria as a chairman and Juan Luis Cebrián as a vicechairman, both non-executives; with two CEOs, Paolo Vasile (programming) and Giuseppe Tringali (advertising). PRISA also has two CEOs and nominates the vice-chairman of the operator.

As part of the agreement, Gestevisión Telecinco would take a 22% shareholding in the Digital+ platform.

The Comisión Nacional de la Competencia (the Spanish antitrust commission), with a resolution dated 28 October 2010, authorised the acquisition by Gestevision Telecinco S.A. of exclusive control of Sociedad General De Television Cuatro S.A.U. (Sogecuatro) through the purchase of 100% of its share capital, subordinate to certain conditions. Telecinco, having met the suspension conditions to which it was subjected, acquired a 22% stake in DTS Distribuidora de Televisión Digital SA (Digital+) and 100% of the share capital of Sogecuatro, which operated the free-to-air channel Cuatro.

On 11 March 2011, following the purchase of Cuatro and the creation of its newest channel, Divinity, the company informed the Comisión Nacional del Mercado de Valores to amend the corporate name of the company from Gestevision Telecinco to Mediaset España Comunicación.

Mediaset España is a supporter of the Hybrid Broadcast Broadband TV (HbbTV) initiative that is promoting and establishing an open European standard for hybrid set-top boxes for the reception of broadcast TV and broadband multimedia applications with a single user interface, and has run pilot HbbTV services.

In 2022, after a bid for the 44% pool of shares it did not already hold, MFE — MediaForEurope (the former "Mediaset Group") completed the takeover of Mediaset España, ending up with roughly an 83% of shares of the company, with the following stated goal being the full merger of Spanish operations with the Milan-based company.

In November 2022, Mediaset España disclosed a restructuring of its senior management, with the appointment of Alessandro Salem and Massimo Musolino as the company's new CEOs, respectively tasked with the areas of Advertising, and Management & Operations, as well as the delegation of certain executive powers in the area of External & Institutional Relations to chairman Borja Prado.

In late January 2023, MFE announced that it would go ahead with Mediaset España merger plan, and offered to pay €3.2687 per share in the Madrid-based broadcaster. It also announced that it will give seven MFE class A shares per one Mediaset España share to investors who backed the merger. On 14 March 2023, MFE offered to buy a 1.05% stake in Mediaset España held by Vivendi for €10.7 million. The following day, 15 March 2023, the shareholders of Mediaset España approved MFE's absorption plan in an extraordinary general meeting, but José Antonio del Barrio Colmanarejo accused the managers of "failing to defend the interests of shareholders in the face of what he saw as an undervaluation of the company".

On 28 April 2023, it was reported that MFE's absorption of Mediaset España was expected to be completed on 3 May. 2 May 2023 was Mediaset España's last day of trading; the Spanish subsidiary's final stock price was €2.89 per share, before the company was delisted from Spanish stock exchanges on the following day, 3 May. Mediaset España's shareholders were offered seven newly issued class A shares of MFE per one Mediaset España share. In total, 220,934,896 new class A shares were issued, with a nominal value of €0.06 each.

On 21 May 2024, Cristina Garmendia was appointed to replace Borja Prado as the new chair of the company.

== Ownership ==
As of May 2023, Mediaset España is fully owned by MFE - MediaForEurope.

== Group responsibilities ==
- Grupo Editorial Tele 5, S.A.U. (Spain)
- Agencia de Televisión Latino-Americana de Servicios y Noticias España, S.A.U. (Spain)
- Telecinco Cinema, S.A.U. (Spain)
- Publiespaña, S.A.U. (Spain)
- Cinematext Media, S.A. (Spain)
- Conecta 5 Telecinco, S.A.U. (Spain)
- Mediacinco Cartera, S.L. (Spain)
- Canal Factoría de Ficción, S.A.U. (Spain)
- Atlas Media, S.A.U. (Spain) — News agency responsible for providing news content for Telecinco's daily news bulletins.
- Agencia de Televisión Latino-Americana de Servicios y Noticias País Vasco, S.A.U. (Spain)
- MiCartera Media, S.A.U. (Spain)
- Publimedia Gestión, S.A.U. (Spain)
- Advanced Media, S.A.U. (Spain)
- Cinematext Media Italia, S.R.L. (Italy)
- Telecinco Factoría de Producción, S.L.U. (Spain)
- Sociedad General de Televisión Cuatro, S.A. (Spain) — Defunct subsidiary responsible for operating Cuatro.
- Compañía Independiente de Noticias de Televisión, S.A. (Spain) — News agency responsible for providing content for the now defunct CNN+ news channel.
- Sogecable Media, S.L. (Spain)

== Channels ==
=== Current ===
Domestic

- Telecinco
- Cuatro
- Factoría de Ficción
- Boing (50% with Warner Bros. Discovery)
- Divinity
- Energy
- Be Mad

=== Former ===
- LaSiete
- Nueve

International

- CincoMAS
