= PRISA TV =

Spanish Pay TV company

PRISA Televisión, S.A.U.
- Type: Sociedad Anónima Unipersonal
- Industry: Media
- Founded: 1989; 37 years ago
- Headquarters: Avenida de los Artesanos, 6, 28760, Tres Cantos
- Key people: Pedro García Guillén (CEO), Manuel Polanco (chairman of the board)
- Services: Television networks, TV and film production
- Revenue: €1.810 billion (2007)
- Operating income: ▲€176.2 million (2007)
- Owner: PRISA
- Number of employees: 1,870 (2007)
- Website: www.prisa.com

PRISA Televisión, S.A.U (PRISA TV) is a pay TV Spanish company in Spain.

== History and profile ==
PRISA TV was established in 1989 and controlled (as of 2007) by PRISA. It was amongst the pioneer companies in the market to introduce interactive systems and specially digital television in Spain. In October 2010 the company changed its name from Sogecable to PRISA TV.

The company mainly manages and acquires audio-visual rights, but also distributes and produces channels. Another of its main activities is the production and distribution of cinematographic exhibitions.

Its restructuring process began in October 2003, and finished in December 2004, with the integration of Vía Digital. They were trying this way to reorder Sogecable's activities absorbing the commitments with thematic channels, suppliers with audio-visual rights and other services. With this, restructuring the company contributed to the audio-visual recovery in Spain.

The producer of Sogecable is Sogecine. It is one of the principal distributors and producers in the Spanish territory, with special importance in the last years.

Sogecable's facilities are in Tres Cantos, in Madrid, producing every day 23 television channels, including nine versions of Canal+ and other 14 channels that are specialised in, sports, cinema, documentaries, children and music. These are watched and distributed across Digital+ (via satellite), cable and ADSL.

In 2005, the group offered a new free television channel, the fifth one in Spain. Its name is Cuatro and occupies the same frequency that Canal+ did up to then. Canal+ then passed to form part only in Digital+ on 7 November 2005.

In 2006 PRISA made a public acquisition bid on 20% of Sogecable's actions to increase its participation up to almost 50%. Prisa increased its stake above the 50% mark in late 2007, triggering a mandatory (by Spanish law) bid for the remainder of the shares. At the close of the offer period on 12 May 2008, Prisa announced that it held over 95% of Sogecable's share capital.

Sogecable is also the main shareholder in Audiovisual Sport (AVS), which owns the TV rights of most Spanish La Liga soccer games. AVS is the company responsible for the lack of Spanish Primera football international coverage after a dispute with Mediapro. Sogecable claims that it is owed €58 million and will not allow Real Madrid or Barcelona games from being played internationally until this debt is paid by Mediapro.

In 2006, Rodolfo Martín Villa was appointed chairman of Sogecable. His term ended in 2010 and Manuel Polanco replaced him in the post.

On May 6, 2014, Telefónica presented a binding offer to acquire the 56% that PRISA had in Canal+, in exchange for paying around €725 million. The following day, PRISA accepted the offer. In addition, it announced that "for a period of thirty days" since then, it would negotiate with Telefónica to continue with the purchase process, which would be regulated and analyzed by the CNMC and Brussels, so that there would be no monopoly or certain conditions would be established negative for competition. The closing of this sale is subject to obtaining the required authorization from the competition authorities and approval by a representative panel of PRISA's financing banks.

On June 18, 2014, Telefónica presented a binding offer to acquire the shares of Mediaset España in Canal+ for €295 million, which represented 22% of the operator's shareholding. On July 4, Mediaset España accepted the offer.

One year later, on April 22, 2015, the CNMC approved the sale of Canal+ to Telefónica. Canal+ began the merger process with Movistar TV on July 7, 2015. As a result, it changed its name to Movistar+, which was officially launched on the market on July 8. In this way, Prisa TV ceases to exist.
