= Telecinco =

Spanish television channel

- Logo since 2024.
- Country: Spain
- Broadcast area: Spain and Andorra, reaching bordering regions via overspill of the Spanish terrestrial network
- Headquarters: Madrid

Programming
- Picture format: 1080i HDTV

Ownership
- Owner: Mediaset España (MFE - MediaForEurope)
- Sister channels: Cuatro; Factoría de Ficción; Boing; Divinity; Energy; Be Mad

History
- Launched: 10 March 1989; 37 years ago (experimental transmissions); 3 March 1990; 36 years ago (official launch)
- Former names: Tele 5 (1989–1997)

Links
- Website: www.telecinco.es

Availability

Terrestrial
- Digital terrestrial television: Mux 25 (Madrid); Mux 34 (Barcelona); Mux 28 (Andorra)

Streaming media
- Mediaset Infinity: Watch live

Telecinco is a Spanish free-to-air television channel operated by Mediaset España. The channel was previously known as Tele 5, because it had first begun its experimental transmissions on 10 March 1989, and a year later, it was officially launched on 3 March 1990, becoming the fifth of the national terrestrial television channels and the second private channel in Spain. In 1997, Tele 5 was rebranded as Telecinco, dropping the biscione-absent flower logo seen in other Mediaset channel logos.

== History ==
On 4 April 1986, the Council of Ministers of Spain approved private television in the country, the legislation was approved in 1988. On 25 August 1989, the contest was held to issue three private television licenses, which were granted to Gestevisión Telecinco, Grupo Antena 3 and Sogecable.

Tele 5 began transmissions experimentally in 1989 to officially begin broadcasting on 3 March 1990, although with limited coverage in Madrid and Barcelona. In January 1991, it achieved national coverage by starting broadcasts in the Canary Islands.

From its foundation until 1994, Tele 5 was directed by Valeriu Lazarov. During this period, a television channel similar to Canale 5 was made, with a lineup based mainly on entertainment programmes such as game, variety and comedy shows, in addition to some serials and movies, leaving the newscasts as 15-minute programmes broadcast at dawn and at night. With this formula the channel achieved its first audience successes.

In 1994, Maurizio Carlotti was appointed as the new director of the network, this with the aim of improving the financial and programme situation, as Tele 5 had lost audiences and advertisers to Antena 3. Carlotti opted for an increase in the production of series and programme formats that had not been tried out in Spain, such as late-night chat shows. In 1997, the channel was reformed so that the links with Canale 5 were scrapped (Telecinco became the first Mediaset channel to drop its trademark flower logo) and news output was increased. It was also at this time the channel re-branded from Tele 5 to Telecinco.

In 1999, Carlotti became the vice president of Telecinco and acted as CEO of Mediaset, so the direction of the channel passed to Paolo Vasile, who ran the channel from that year until October 2022. With the arrival of the new millennium, Telecinco began broadcasting reality shows and sporting events - the final of the first series of Gran Hermano remains Telecinco's highest rated broadcast ever. In 2004 the channel began trading on the Madrid Stock Exchange and that same year, it won the title of most-watched channel from La 1. During this period, the channel began to be accused of trash TV due to the proliferation of spaces dedicated to gossip and related entertainment, which were present in Telecinco from its creation until 2023.

On 30 November 2005, Telecinco launched Telecinco Estrellas and Telecinco Sport, the network's thematic channels dedicated to the consolidation of the brand in Spanish digital terrestrial television, which was released on the same day. On 20 September 2010, Telecinco began transmissions in HD.

In 2009 Gestevisión Telecinco and PRISA TV began the procedures for the merger of the open television divisions of both companies. The agreement took effect on 1 January 2011, the new company resulting from this process was renamed Mediaset España Comunicación.

After the merger, Mediaset came to control eight channels: Cuatro; LaSiete; Factoría de Ficción; Divinity; Boing; Energy and Nueve, so part of its programming was allocated to the grids of the rest of the group's channels. In May 2014, LaSiete and Nueve were closed due to a court order. In 2016 Telecinco launched Be Mad.

In 2017, the channel was involved in a scandal due to an alleged sexual abuse that occurred during Gran Hermano, the local version of Big Brother. The crisis resulted in the abandonment of some advertisers due to the network's handling of the crisis, which was accused of acting late, exposing the victim to reliving the situation and trying to silence the information related to the act.

In 2022, Telecinco began to suffer from an exhaustion in its programming, which resulted in the loss of leadership in favor of Antena 3. For this reason, Mediaset initiated a reform in the channel's programming, Paolo Vasile left his position after twenty-three years and was replaced by Alessandro Salem, who assumed greater responsibility in the position.

In 2023 Telecinco started to eliminate gossip and social affairs programmes for more family-oriented content such as game and reality shows, in addition to establishing a series of guidelines for presenters and collaborators on the channel, to which they prohibited them from issuing political ideas on entertainment programs or criticising other programs on the network and some celebrities. Its new slogan, Contigo siempre, was intended to reflect the new family-friendly style. The channel had been criticised for chat shows such as Sálvame taking up the vast majority of the channel's daytime output, and questionable scheduling, such as programmes with a 16+ rating aired across daytime slots.

== Programming ==
In 2014, Telecinco was the most viewed channel in Spain with a share of 14.5%. Telecinco is a general channel catering to all audiences. It shows popular films, series, and entertainment shows.

The channel's programming includes such series as La que se avecina, Sin tetas no hay paraíso, and Aída, as well as entertainment shows such as Crónicas marcianas and Hay una cosa que te quiero decir and the talent show The Voice. For many years the channel had a reputation for celebrity gossip and daytime chat shows such as Sálvame and El programa de Ana Rosa, however after the channel's reformatting in 2023, which saw Sálvame axed and Ana Rosa moved to a more competitive afternoon timeslot, this has started to decrease.

The channel is also known for its reality shows, having produced a number of popular series in the last decade – Gran Hermano, Supervivientes, Hotel Glam, and Operación Triunfo, amongst others. Reality shows made up much of the content of the channel's other programmes. All of these programmes experienced a substantial ratings boost thanks to the so-called Reality Effect.

== Production ==
Telecinco has digitalised their production facilities. It allowed them to broadcast their channels in up to Spanish and original language, stereo sound, interactive services and high-definition television.
