= Factoría de Ficción =

- Country: Spain
- Broadcast area: Spain, reaching bordering regions via overspill of the Spanish terrestrial network

Programming
- Language: Spanish
- Picture format: 1080i HDTV

Ownership
- Owner: Mediaset España
- Sister channels: Telecinco; Cuatro; Boing; Divinity; Energy; Be Mad

History
- Launched: 10 November 2005; 21 years ago
- Former names: Telecinco Estrellas (30 November 2005–17 February 2008); FDF Telecinco (18 February 2008–25 July 2009)

Factoría de Ficción (lit. 'Factory of Fiction'; formerly Telecinco Estrellas and then FDF Telecinco) is a Spanish free-to-air television channel owned by Mediaset España. It is a 24-hour channel and airs both acquired and original television series and films. It is available on free-to-air digital television, and cable television.

== History ==
Gestevisión Telecinco launched the channel as Telecinco Estrellas on 30 November 2005, broadcasting drama and comedy programmes from around the world. The channel broadcast on Digital terrestrial television (DTT), as well as on satellite and cable.

On February 18, 2008, Gestevisión Telecinco relaunched the channel as FDF Telecinco, reinstating the FDF brand previously associated with Factoría de Ficción, a specialty television channel which Gestevisión jointly operated with Grupo Antena 3 and the production company Globomedia from 2000 until 2007. At the relaunch, the channel broadcast drama series of Gestevisión's own production or from its catalog of series acquired abroad. On 25 July 2009, the channel was renamed Factoría de Ficción, a name it has kept since then.

In November 2015 Mediaset España relaunched Energy as the company's second channel dedicated to television series, so FDF's programming began to focus on Spanish drama series and films, as well as some general entertainment programs, while most of the foreign series acquired by Mediaset España began to be broadcast on Energy.

== Programming ==
Factoría de Ficcion airs acquired television series, both international and local, most of them reruns of series previously aired on sister channels Cuatro and Telecinco.

From 11 May 2009, the channel also used to broadcast the children programming block Boing in weekdays, but in 2010, Boing became a full channel, and the block disappeared after 2010. Boing is a joint-venture from Gestevisión Telecinco and Turner Broadcasting System.
