= Telecommunications in Spain =

Telecommunications in Spain is accomplished through the transmission of information by various types of technologies within Spain.

== History ==
Telephone calls began being made in Spain in the late 19th century, around the time when the state took control of phone services, which in turn granted the operation of the service to private bodies.

In the early and mid 20th century, Compañía Telefónica Nacional de España (CTNE) effectively monopolised Spanish telecommunications, which was founded in 1924. The same year, a submarine telephone cable connecting Algeciras with the territory of Ceuta facilitated cross-strait communication during the Rif War. In 1926, two switchboards were set up in Santander and Madrid, the latter by Alfonso XIII.

During his rule, Francisco Franco became a major shareholder in CTNE, and recentralised state control of telecommunications. In 1957, the Madrid-Zaragoza-Barcelona fibre optic cable was installed. However, public telephones were not installed until the 1960s. As of 2015, there were around 25,000 remaining public phones in Spain.

== Telephones (landline and cellular) ==
=== Companies ===
- Telephones - main lines in use: 18,431,000 (2023)
- Telephones - mobile cellular: 55,740,000 (2012)
- Telephone system: generally adequate, modern facilities
  - domestic: NA
  - international: 22 coaxial submarine cables; satellite earth stations - 2 Intelsat (1 Atlantic Ocean and 1 Indian Ocean), NA Eutelsat; tropospheric scatter to adjacent countries

=== Major providers ===
Logo	Operator	Subscribers (in millions)	Ownership
	Jazztel	16,187,000 mobile	Orange
	Movistar	41,547,000	Telefonica
	Vodafone	8,000,000	Vodafone
	Massmovil	14,000,000 movile	Massmovil

== Radio ==
- Radio broadcast stations: AM 208, FM 715, shortwave 1 (1998)
- Radios: 13.1 million (1997)
- RNE is Spain's national public radio broadcaster and operates six stations:
  - Radio Nacional - General service of mostly speech-based programming
  - Radio Clásica - Classical music and concerts
  - Radio 3 - Music outside the mainstream scene
  - Ràdio 4 - Regional service broadcasting in the Catalan language
  - Radio 5 (Todo Noticias) - 24-hour news channel
  - Radio Exterior de España - International, external broadcasting service

== Television ==
- Television broadcast stations: 228 (plus 2,112 repeaters); note - these figures include 11 television broadcast stations and 89 repeaters in the Canary Islands (September 1995)
- Televisions: 16.2 million (1997)

== Internet ==
- Internet service providers (ISPs): 49 (1999)
- Internet hosts: 3,264 million (2008)
- Internet users: 33.7 million (2012)
- Country code (Top-level domain): ES

== See also ==
- History of telecommunication
- Internet in Spain
- Media of Spain
  - Television in Spain
  - Radio in Spain
  - Newspapers in Spain
- Outline of telecommunication
- Telefónica
