= TVE Internacional =

International feed of TVE

- Logo used since 2026
- Country: Spain
- Broadcast area: Worldwide
- Network: Televisión Española (TVE)
- Headquarters: Prado del Rey, Pozuelo de Alarcón (Madrid)

Programming
- Language: Spanish
- Picture format: 1080i HDTV (downscaled to 16:9 576i/480i for the SDTV feed)

Ownership
- Owner: Radiotelevisión Española (RTVE)
- Sister channels: La 1 La 2; 24 Horas; Clan; Teledeporte; Star TVE

History
- Launched: 1 December 1989; 36 years ago

Links
- Website: TVE Internacional

Availability

Terrestrial
- ZAP (Angola): Channel 163
- Neosat (Bulgaria): Channel 437
- YES (Israel): Channel 125
- T-Home (Hungary): Channel 127
- MEO and NOS (Portugal): Channel 221
- Azam TV (Tanzania): Channel 250
- Cignal TV (Philippines): Channel 168
- Rogers Cable (Canada): Channel 2329

Streaming media
- Sling TV: Internet Protocol television

TVE Internacional is a Spanish satellite free-to-air and pay television channel owned and operated by Televisión Española (TVE), the television division of state-owned public broadcaster Radiotelevisión Española (RTVE). It is the corporation's international television service, and is known for broadcasting mainstream, generalist and cultural programming, including Telediario news bulletins, primetime drama and entertainment from both TVE's La 1, La 2, Clan and 24 Horas.

It was launched on 1 December 1989. It broadcasts to Latin America, Western Sahara, Equatorial Guinea, Americas and the Philippines, in which the vast majority of Spanish-speaking people are located.

Several news bulletins are provided during the day, covering a mixed Spanish and International agenda. Telediario is a bulletin produced for and also broadcast in Spain, simulcast on the international station. However, editions of Telediario Internacional are also produced specially for the channel.

A limited number of advertisements are shown on the channel. More usually, network commercial breaks on programmes broadcast live in Spain are covered with a clock and short information films about Spain and its wildlife, although sometimes the advertisements are shown.

== History ==
TVE Internacional began its test broadcasts on 1 December 1989 and officially on 1 December 1990. In its early years, the channel broadcast a single program for America and Europe, consisting of a re-broadcast of slots premiered on La 1 and La 2. From 15 April 1991, differentiated programming was designed for one and other continents. Since 1992, TVE Internacional has been broadcasting via the Astra and Hispasat satellites for Latin America.

The signal of TVE Internacional has been received in Asia and Oceania since December 1995 and in Africa since 12 October 1999.

== Signal structure ==
TVE Internacional is geographically distributed in three separate feeds, each with the programming schedule adapted to the time zones of the corresponding area:

- America: covers all Latin American and the Caribbean countries, as well as the United States and Canada. Use as reference the time zones of Argentina (UTC-3), Mexico (UTC-6) and Miami (UTC-5/-4 DST).
- Europe-Africa: covers the entire European continent including Spain, the Middle East and Africa. Use as reference the time zones of Central Europe (UTC+1/+2), Moscow (UTC+3) and the United Arab Emirates (UTC+4).
- Asia-Oceania: Part of the Arabian Peninsula, Central Asia, Southeast Asia, Australia, New Zealand and the Pacific Islands.

== Distribution ==
In Europe, it is available free-to-air on Eutelsat Hot Bird 13° East. Due to economic reasons, it moved its satellite distribution for Europe to Astra 19.2°E along with 24 Horas and the RTVE radios (RNE Radio Nacional, RNE Radio Clásica, RNE Radio 3, RNE Ràdio 4, RNE Radio 5, Radio Exterior) between January 2014 and February 2020.

The channel no longer is seen in Britain and Ireland through the Sky television platform on Eutelsat 33C at 28.5° East. In the Americas, it is available as part of RTVE's Digital Package for America on Hispasat 1C (encrypted). In Asia, it is available on AsiaSat 5 at 100.5° E and Intelsat 19 at 166° E (both unencrypted).

== See also ==
- List of international broadcasters
- Cubavision International
- Las Estrellas Internacional
- Ve Plus
