= 24 Horas (Spanish TV channel) =

Spanish TV news channel

Canal 24 Horas
- Country: Spain
- Broadcast area: Worldwide
- Network: Televisión Española (TVE)
- Headquarters: Torrespaña, Madrid

Programming
- Language: Spanish
- Picture format: 1080i HDTV (downscaled to 16:9 480i/576i for the international feed)

Ownership
- Owner: Radiotelevisión Española (RTVE)
- Sister channels: La 1 La 2 Clan; Teledeporte; TVE Internacional; Star TVE

History
- Launched: 15 September 1997; 29 years ago

Links
- Website: www.rtve.es/noticias

Availability

Terrestrial
- Digital terrestrial television (United States): WORA-TV channel 5.3 (Mayaguez, PR)

Streaming media
- RTVE website: Watch live

Canal 24 Horas (Spanish pronunciation: [bejntiˈkwatɾo ˈoɾas], lit. '24 Hours Channel') is a Spanish free-to-air television channel owned and operated by Televisión Española (TVE), the television division of state-owned public broadcaster Radiotelevisión Española (RTVE). It is the corporation's all-news television channel, and is known for its 24-hour rolling news service and its live coverage of breaking news.

It was launched on 15 September 1997 as the first 24-hour rolling television news service in Spain. It was the only one until 27 January 1999, when CNN+ started broadcasting. When CNN+ ceased transmissions on 28 December 2010, Canal 24 Horas became the only nationwide rolling television news service.

Its rolling news service is produced by TVE's news services at its Torrespaña facilities, at the foot of the communications tower. News items are produced, with the footage taken by their own camera operators, by the central newsroom in Torrespaña, by the newsrooms of TVE territorial centers across Spain, by TVE foreign correspondents around the world or by on-the-scene special reporters. They also produce the flagship Telediario news bulletins and factual programmes (such as Informe Semanal) for La 1, La 2 and TVE Internacional, which are also broadcast on Canal 24 Horas. Its simulcasts of Telediario provide sign language interpretation.

== Distribution ==
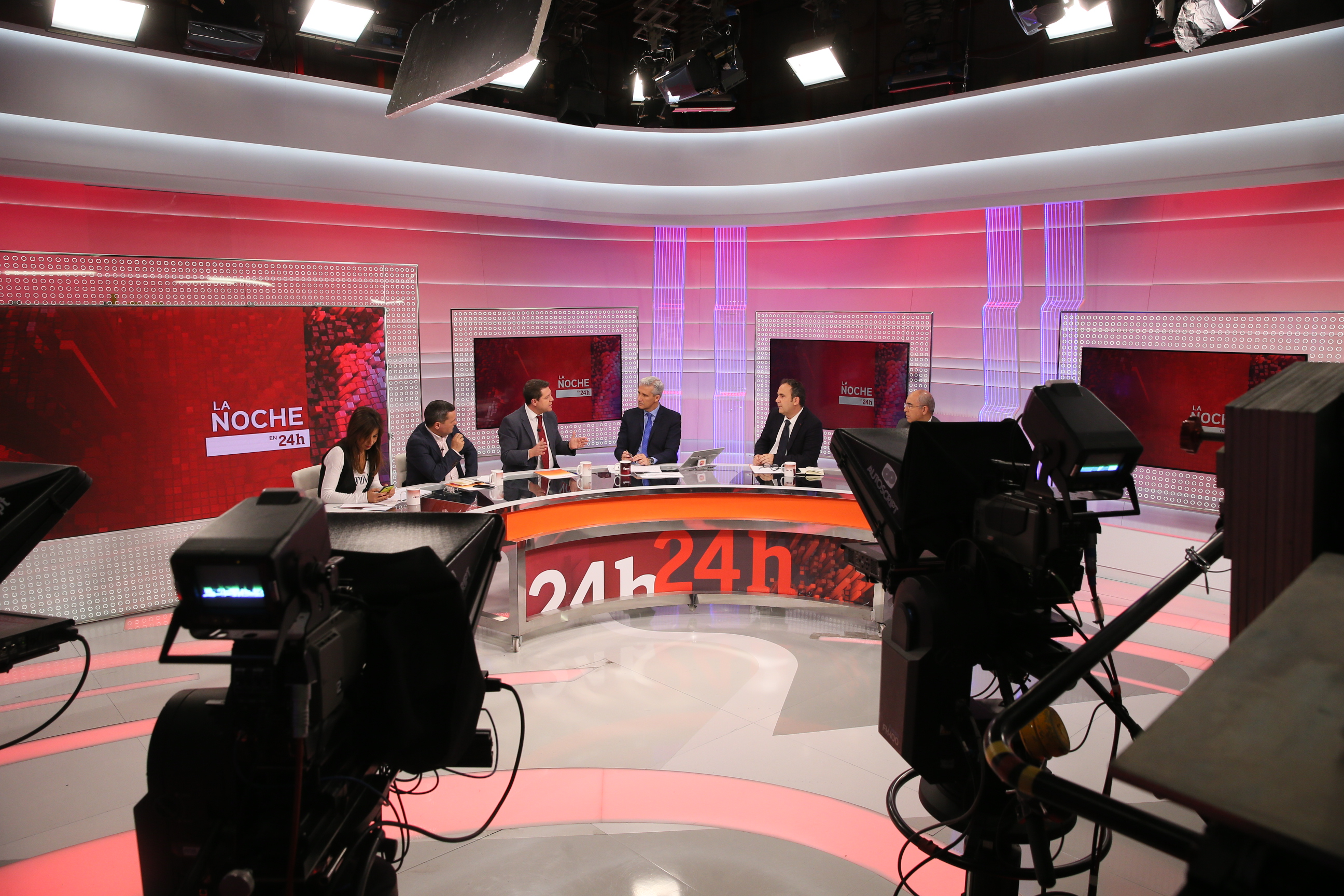
Canal 24 Horas studio in 2017

It was initially available on the Vía Digital digital satellite package on the Hispasat satellite at 30° West, and was encrypted, and thus mainly aimed to Spain, although it could also be seen simulcasted by TVE Internacional at certain times of the day. However, it eventually started simulcasting on the SES Astra and Eutelsat Hot Bird satellite systems in the clear, moving later to free-to-air digital transmissions on the same satellite at a later date.

Currently, the channel is available on the Astra 1KR and Hispasat 1D satellites at 19.2°E and 30°W respectively as part of the Digital + package for Spain only, on the Eutelsat Hot Bird satellite at 13°E for the whole of Europe, and the Hispasat 1C satellite at 30°W for the Americas until March 2006. Afterward, it will only be possible to receive TVE through Spanish packages offered by Dish Network and DirecTV in the Americas with 24 Horas also being available on Charter Spectrum.

Since November 2005, it has also been available on digital terrestrial television in Spain. La 1 simulcasts the channel between 04:00 or 05:00 (local time) and 06:30. During the public holidays or the summer break, it simulcasts until 10:05.

In Europe, it is available free-to-air on Eutelsat Hot Bird 13° East. Due to economic reasons, it moved its satellite distribution for Europe to Astra 19.2°E alongside TVE Internacional and the RTVE radios (RNE Radio Nacional, RNE Radio Clásica, RNE Radio 3, RNE Ràdio 4, RNE Radio 5 and Radio Exterior de España) between January 2014 and January 2020. Since July 1, 2019, it is also available terrestrially in parts of Puerto Rico over the second subchannel of television station WORA-TV.

== Presenters ==
=== Diario 24h (weekdays 10 am – 3 pm), La tarde en 24h (weekdays 5 – 8 pm), weekday and weekend news bulletins ===
- Ángeles Bravo
- Lluís Guilera
- Beatriz Pérez-Aranda
- Marta Solano
- Olga Lambea
- Desirée Ndjambo-León
- Ana Belén Roy
- Miriam Moreno

=== Nightly news bulletins of the weekdays (12:05 am – 2:30 am and then repeat until 6:00 am) ===
- Moisés Rodríguez

=== Nightly news bulletins of the weekend (9 pm – 2 am and then repeat until 7 am) ===
- Pedro Carreño
- Jesús Amor

=== La noche en 24h (from monday until thursday, 10 pm – 12:05 am) ===
- Xabier Fortes

=== Weather ===
- Silvia Laplana
- Nuria Seró
- Ana de Roque
- Irene Santa
- Marc Santandreu

== Logo history ==
September 1997 – December 2005	December 2005 – August 2008	August 2008 – January 2026	January 2026–present
