= List of radio stations in Spain =

This is a list of radio stations broadcast in Spain.

== National public radio service ==
RNE is Spain's national public radio broadcaster and operates six stations:

- Radio Nacional - General service of mostly speech-based programming
- Radio Clásica - Classical music and concerts
- Radio 3 - Music outside the mainstream scene and cultural
- Ràdio 4 - Regional service broadcasting in the Catalan language
- Radio 5 (Todo Noticias) - 24-hour news channel
- Radio Exterior de España - International, external broadcasting service

== National commercial networks ==
The following groups operate commercial radio networks broadcasting across Spain:

=== PRISA Radio ===
- Cadena SER - Generalist radio station featuring mostly news, talk and sports.
- Los 40 - Contemporary hit radio station. Comparable to Capital or BBC Radio 1.
- Cadena Dial - Spanish adult-contemporary radio station.
- Los 40 Classic - Oldies music station dedicated to the hits from mostly the 1980s and '90s.
- Los 40 Dance - Electronic dance music station dedicated to a wide variety of its sub-genres.
- Los 40 Urban - Urban contemporary music station dedicated to reggaeton and trap music.
- Radiolé - Music station dedicated to copla, rumba, flamenco and sevillanas.

=== Radio Popular ===
- Cadena COPE - Generalist radio station featuring mostly news, talk and sports with a religious appeal.
- Cadena 100 - Adult-contemporary radio station. Comparable to Heart.
- MegaStar FM - Youth-focused hybrid pop/dance music station that includes limited recurrent rotation.
- Rock FM - Classic rock music station.

=== Atresmedia Radio ===
- Onda Cero - Generalist radio station featuring news, talk and sports.
- Europa FM - Contemporary hit radio station dedicated to pop-rock hits since the 2000s.
- Melodía FM - Oldies music station dedicated to the hits from the 1970s, '80s and '90s.

=== Kiss Media ===
- Kiss FM - Oldies music station dedicated to the hits mostly from the 1980s and '90s, sometimes from the 1970s and 2000s, and sporadically from today. Comparable to Magic Radio
- Hit FM - Youth-focused mostly-current international contemporary hit radio station.

=== Unidad Editorial ===
- Radio Marca - Sports radio station. Comparable to Talksport or ESPN Deportes Radio.

=== Libertad Digital ===
- esRadio

=== Intereconomía Corporación ===
- Radio Inter
- Radio Intereconomía

=== Others ===
- Capital Radio
- Costa Del Mar - Chillout radio desde Ibiza since 2012.

== Current FM band in Madrid ==
This is a list of radio stations in Madrid, Spain. There are 47 radio stations in Madrid.

- 87.7: Ushuaia Radio
- 87.9: Espy FM
- 88.2: RNE Radio Nacional
- 88.6: La Kalle
- 89.0: Los 40 Classic
- 89.5: Pepe Radio
- 89.9: Hit FM
- 90.3: RNE Radio 5
- 91.0: Europa FM
- 91.7: Cadena Dial
- 92.4: Los 40 Dance
- 92.9: Radio China FM
- 93.2: RNE Radio 3
- 93.5: Radio Inter
- 93.9: Los 40
- 94.2: Vida FM
- 94.8: COPE Más Madrid
- 95.1: Radio Intereconomía
- 95.4: Radio Intercontinental
- 96.0: Loca FM
- 96.5: RNE Radio Clásica
- 97.2: Radio María
- 98.0: Onda Cero
- 99.1: esRadio
- 99.5: Cadena 100
- 99.8: Sol Radio
- 100.4: Vaughan Radio
- 100.7: MegaStar FM
- 100.9: Onda del Plata FM
- 101.3: Onda Madrid
- 101.7: Rock FM
- 102.1: Decisión Radio
- 102.4: Factory FM
- 102.7: Kiss FM
- 103.0: Unika FM
- 103.2: Capital Radio
- 103.5: Radio Marca
- 103.9: Los 40 Urban
- 104.3: SER+
- 104.5: Informa Radio
- 105.1: Costa Del Mar FM
- 105.4: Cadena SER
- 106.3: Cadena COPE
- 106.8: Melodía FM
- 107.2: Suena FM
- 107.5: Radio Vallekas
- 108.0: Rec Radio

== English-language radio stations ==
Name	Frequencies	Website
Almeria Radio	FM 107.5 Albox & The Almanzora Valley	http://almeriaradio.live
Bay Radio	FM 88.4 Moraira, 89.0 Torrevieja, 89.2 Valencia-Denia, 89.4 Alicante-Calpe, 91.5 Turre, 98.5 Javea-Calpe	http://www.bayradio.fm
BeachGrooves Radio	FM 102.0 Fuengirola, 103.1 Malaga, 103.5 Marbella	http://www.beachgrooves.com
Big FM	FM 89.9 & 91.1 South Costa Blanca	http://www.bigradiospain.com
Breeze 97.7	FM 97.7 Almanzora Valley	http://www.breezefm.es
Central FM	FM 98.6 Motril-Calahonda, 103.9 Calahonda-Gibraltar	http://www.centralfm.com
Chilli FM	FM 91.5 Marbella, FM 102.8 Gibraltar - Sotogrande and FM 100.9 Malaga	http://www.chilli.fm
Costa Calida International Radio	FM 90.0, 100.0 Costa Calida	http://www.costacalidaradio.com
Fresh Radio Spain	FM 97.0 Benidorm & FM 96.7 Orihuela Costa	http://www.freshradiospain.com
Fresh Radio Gold	FM 90.1 Benidorm	http://www.freshradiospain.com
Global Radio	FM 93.6 Nerja-Gibraltar	http://www.global.fm
Heat Mallorca	FM 88.2 to 88.6 Mallorca	https://www.heatmallorca.com/
Hot FM Gold	FM 96.2 Calpe to El Campello	http://www.hotfm.fm
Mallorca Sunshine Radio	FM 106.1 Mallorca	http://www.mallorcasunshineradio.com
Mix 106 FM	FM 106 Gibraltar to Nerja	https://radiomix106.com/
Redz fm Costa del Sol	FM 96.2 Marbella	http://www.redzfm.net
Spectrum FM	Costa Blanca South FM 106.3 / Costa Blanca North FM 90.2 / Costa Calida / Costa Del Sol FM 97.6, 91.3 / Mallorca FM 105.2 / Costa Almeria FM 96.1, 97.3, 106.8	http://www.spectrumfm.net
Sunshine FM	FM 102.8 Costa Blanca	http://www.sunshineradio.fm
Sunshine Radio Costa Del Sol	FM 92.1 Costa Del Sol	http://www.sunshineradio.es
Talk Radio Europe	FM 91.9 Costa del Sol West, 104.4 Costa del Sol East, 105.5 Axarquia 98.7 Algeciras, Gibraltar, San Roque, Sotogrande, Casares, Sabanillas, 96.3 Costa Blanca North, 104.8 Mallorca	http://www.tre.radio
TKO FM	FM 91.9 Torrevieja	http://www.tko.fm
Total Star Med	FM 101.3, 94.6, 104.1 Costa Calida	http://www.totalstarmed.com

== English-language radio stations in Canary Islands ==
Name	Frequencies	Website
Centreforce	FM 89.1 Tenerife	http://www.centreforceradio.com
Coast FM Classic Gold	FM 91.5 South Tenerife and DAB Digital radio	http://www.coastgold.es
Coast FM	97.9 North Tenerife, 105.5 Santa Cruz Tenerife, 102.8 South Tenerife and La Gomera, 102.5 West Tenerife and La Gomera, 102.8 El Hierro, 102.3 West Gran Canaria, 103.0 Puerto Rico Gran Canaria, 102.6 South Gran Canaria, 103.2 Maspalomas Gran Canaria, DAB Digital radio	http://coast.fm
Energy FM	FM 106.0 Tenerife, 106.6 Gran Canaria, DAB Digital radio	http://www.dancemusicradio.net
Coast FM Rock	DAB digital radio	http://www.coast.fm
Oasis FM	FM 106.6 South Tenerife	http://www.oasisfm.com
Power ON FM Tenerife	FM 89.8 South Tenerife	http://www.poweronfm.com
Power ON FM Lanzarote & Fuerteventura	FM 99.2 & 92.2	http://www.poweron.fm
Radio Brian	FM 96.8 South Gran Canaria	https://www.facebook.com/profile.php?id=100031152258318
Smooth Radio	DAB+ Gran Canaria, Tenerife, Fuerteventura, Lanzarote & La Gomera / 103.7 Southern Gran Canaria	http://www.mysmoothradio.com

== Other foreign-language radio stations ==
German

Name	Frequencies	Website
Inselradio	FM 95.8, FM 96.9 Mallorca	http://www.inselradio.com

Dutch

Name	Frequencies	Website
JammFM Radio Costa del Sol	FM 90.5 Coastline, FM 97.1 Marbella, FM 104.8 Guadalhorce, DAB+	https://www.jammfmradio.com
Holland FM	FM 90.7 Gran Canaria	http://www.hollandfm.es
XtraFM Costa Blanca Radio	FM 92.7 Alicante - Altea, 88.4 Calpe - Denia	https://xtrafm.es/

Catalan

Name	Frequencies	Website
Ona de Sants-Montjuïc	FM 94.6	http://onadesants.cat/wp/

Russian

Name	Frequencies	Website
РУССКОЕ 105 FM	FM 105.0 Tenerife	http://russkoe-105fm.ru

Nordic

Name	Frequencies	Website
Radio Finlandia (now FugeFM)	FM 102,6 Fuengirola	https://fugefm.fi/

Ukrainian

Name	Frequencies	Website
Ucrania FM	FM 106.8 & 94.1 Alicante, FM 97.5 Benidorm, FM 97.0 Elche, FM 91.6 Torrevieja, FM 98.8 Gandia, FM 97.9 Valencia	https://ucraniafm.com/

== See also ==
- Media of Spain
- Internet in Spain
- Television in Spain
- Newspapers in Spain
- List of Spanish media groups
