= Ona =

Ona or ONA may refer to:

== Anthropology ==
- Ona or Selkʼnam people, an indigenous people of southern Argentina and Chile
  - Ona or Selkʼnam language, once spoken in Isla Grande de Tierra del Fuego
- Ona, a pre-Aksumite culture in Sembel, Eritrea

== Geography ==
- Ona, Møre og Romsdal, an island in Møre og Romsdal county, Norway
- Ona, Vestland, an island in Øygarden, Norway
- Ona River or Biryusa, a river in Irkutsk Oblast, Russia
- Ona, West Virginia, a community in the United States
- Ona, Florida, a community in the United States
- Ona River, in Russia
- Ona Ara, a local government area in Nigeria
- Ona Ona, a former neighborhood of Mount Bindango, Queensland, Australia
- Ona Station, a railway station in Kita-ku, Japan
- Ona Beach State Park, in Oregon, United States
- Oña, a town in Castile and León, Spain
- Oña Canton, a canton in Ecuador

== Transportation ==
- Ona (yacht), former name of Al Raya
- Ontario (Amtrak station) (station code), in Ontario, California, United States
- Overseas National Airways, a defunct U.S. airline
- Winona Municipal Airport (IATA code), in Winona, Minnesota, United States

== Organizations ==
- Office of National Assessments, an Australian intelligence agency
- Oficina Nacional Antidrogas, a Venezuelan anti-drug agency
- Office of Net Assessment, a U.S. defense agency
- Oman News Agency, an Omani government news agency
- ONA Group, a defunct Moroccan holding company
- Online News Association, a professional online journalists organization
- Ontario Nurses' Association, a Canadian trade union for registered nurses
- Open and affirming, a United Church of Christ program
- Order of Nine Angles, a Satanist organization

== Other uses ==
- Ona (name)
- Ona (Blake), daughter of Urizen in William Blake's mythology
- ONA (restaurant), the first vegan restaurant in France to win a Michelin star
- O.N.A., a Polish heavy metal band
- Ona de Sants-Montjuïc, a radio station in Barcelona, Spain
- Ona Kantheeswarar Temple, a Hindu temple in Tamil Nadu, India
- Original net animation, an anime title directly released onto the Internet
- "Ona to zna", a song by the Serbian band Idoli
- Ona Lukoszaite, a character in the novel The Jungle by Upton Sinclair

== See also ==
- Onna (disambiguation)
