= Tírame de la lengua =

- Logo
- Presented by: Ana Belen Roy
- Country of origin: Spain
- Original language: Spanish

Production
- Running time: 30 minutes
- Production company: Televisión Española

Original release
- Release: 1997

Host Ana Belen Roy with young contestants

Tirame de la Lengua (Make Me Speak or, literally, Pull My Tongue) is a TV game show broadcast on Televisión Española (TVE) and TVE Internacional. The teams are the Lenguetazos and Lenguetones. Children between 9 and 12 years old participate, and slide down an enormous tongue to enter the set. During the half hour show, the contestants play games like Letter Soup and Trabalenguas (tongue twisters) with a lollipop in their mouths. An animated Miguel de Cervantes judges the results of the teams.

The host is Ana Belen Roy, a journalist from Madrid who joined Televisión Española in 1997, where she has worked as an announcer and a reporter.
