= Miguel Álvarez-Fernández =

Spanish sound artist, composer and theorist

Miguel Álvarez-Fernández (born 28 November 1979 in Madrid, Spain) is a sound artist, composer, filmmaker, theorist and curator working between Madrid and Berlin, where he has taught at the Electronic Music Studio of Technische Universität Berlin. He also lectures regularly at the Department of Art History and Musicology of the University of Oviedo (Spain), and at the European University of Madrid as a specialist in Sound Art and Electroacoustic music.

His artistic and theoretical work addresses problematic concepts like the relationships between sexuality and music (both understood as socio-cultural constructions, rather than 'natural categories'), or the connections between interactive processes and the illusion of control. Álvarez-Fernández has explored these issues in his sound installations and musical compositions, both alone and as a member of the art group DissoNoiSex.

== Career ==
The works of Álvarez-Fernández have been presented in several venues in Europe and America, including the Museo Nacional Centro de Arte Reina Sofía, the National Auditorium of Music and the Residencia de Estudiantes (where Álvarez-Fernández was composer-in-residence from 2002 to 2005) in Madrid, Technische Universität Berlin, The Huset gallery in Copenhagen, Harvard University, New York University, the Eyebeam Gallery in New York and O'culto da Ajuda in Lisbon, among many others. He has also composed music for different audiovisual productions, including the film "A via láctea", by Brazilian director Lina Chamie, premiered at the Cannes Film Festival in 2007.

As a musicologist and sound-art theorist, Álvarez-Fernández has lectured (and his writings have been published) in Spain, Germany, Italy, France, Denmark, Sweden, Macedonia, Serbia, Lithuania, Russia and the United States, among other countries.

His work as a sound-art curator is widely recognized in Spain. For the project "Itinerarios del sonido" (co-curated along with María Bella) fourteen internationally recognized artists were invited (in many cases, for the first time) to Madrid, in order to create a new sound piece that later would be listened to in specific bus-stops around the city. Participants of this project included Vito Acconci, Jorge Eduardo Eielson, Julio Estrada, Luc Ferrari, Bill Fontana, Susan Hiller, Christina Kubisch, Adrian Piper and Trevor Wishart, among others. In 2007, Álvarez-Fernández curated in Berlin "Offener Klang / Sonido Abierto" as part of the "Linux Audio Conference", with concerts and workshops at Technische Universität Berlin and at the Instituto Cervantes Berlin. In April 2011 he curated, along with Chema de Francisco and Rubén Gutiérrez del Castillo, the "SON" Festival, which presented for the first time at the Auditorio Nacional de Música (Madrid) the newest generation of Spanish sound artists in a series of concerts, performances and sound installations.

Also in 2011, Miguel Álvarez-Fernández received the IV "Cura Castillejo" prize, awarded at the Nits de Deshielo i Art Festival, organized in Valencia by sound artist Llorenç Barber (the three previous recipients of the award being Francisco López, Fátima Miranda and sound installation pioneer Luis Lugán).

In 2015 he directed, in collaboration with Luis Deltell, the feature-length documentary "No escribiré arte con mayúscula" ("I will not write art with a capital letter"), devoted to the life and works of Spanish pioneer of conceptual art Isidoro Valcárcel Medina, premiered at the Festival Punto de Vista (Pamplona).

In 2008 Miguel Álvarez-Fernández became host at Radio Clásica/Radio Nacional de España for the weekly radio broadcast Ars Sonora, a cult program (founded in 1985) devoted to sound art and experimental music.

== Bibliography ==
- Álvarez Fernández, Miguel. 2005a. "Dissonance, Sex and Noise: (Re)Building (Hi)Stories of Electroacoustic Music". In ICMC 2005: Free Sound Conference Proceedings, International Computer Music Conference, Escola Superior de Musica de Catalunya, Barcelona, Spain, September 4–10, 2005. Barcelona: International Computer Music Conference; International Computer Music Association.; SuviSoft Oy Ltd.
- Álvarez Fernández, Miguel. 2005b. "Disonancia y emancipación: comodidad en/de algunas estéticas musicales del siglo XX". Taller Sonoro: Revista cuatrimestral de música contemporánea 4 (January). ISSN 1887-2093
- Álvarez-Fernández, Miguel. 2005c. "El comisariado como metodología de investigación musicológica". Revista de Musicología 28, no. 2:1425–34. ISSN 0210-1459
- Álvarez-Fernández, Miguel. 2007a. "Posibilidades (e imposibilidades) de los "nuevos medios tecnológicos" en la creación sonora". Sul Ponticello. Revista on-line de estudios musicales 7 (January). ISSN 1697-6886
- Álvarez-Fernández, Miguel. 2007b. "The Sound of Meaning: Aesthetical Approaches to the Manipulation of Speech Sounds" (seminar syllabus).
- Anon. [n.d.]. "Miguel Álvarez-Fernández" Spanish Wikipedia article.
- Bandrés, Jon. 2011. "Nace SON, festival para la nueva generación de artistas sonoros españoles". RTVE.ES, 8 April 2011.
- Correa, Sergio. 2007. "Nuevos instrumentos para música nueva". BBC MUNDO.COM, 27 March 2007.
- Prieto, Ruth. 2013. "No puedo entender la música como algo distinto de la política, interview with Miguel Álvarez-Fernández". El Compositor Habla, April 2013.
- Reverter, Arturo. 2011. "SON. Músicadhoy se asoma a la cantera". El Cultural 8 April 2011.
- Sánchez, Sergio. 2013. "España electroacústica, interview with Miguel Álvarez-Fernández". Blog del experto FNAC, 2 August 2013.
- Scaravaggi, Silvia. [n.d.] "Alvarez-Fernandez: Sound Amateur". Digimag 27, sept 07.
