= Star (TVE channel) =

Star TVE
- Logo used since 2026
- Country: Spain
- Broadcast area: Spain; Worldwide
- Network: Televisión Española (TVE)
- Headquarters: Prado del Rey, Pozuelo de Alarcón (Madrid)

Programming
- Language: Spanish
- Picture format: 1080i HDTV

Ownership
- Owner: Radiotelevisión Española (RTVE)
- Sister channels: La 1 La 2; 24 Horas; Clan; Teledeporte; TVE Internacional

History
- Launched: 1 August 2015; 11 years ago (test); 18 January 2016; 10 years ago (regular)

Links
- Website: RTVE

Star TVE is a Spanish international subscription television channel, which broadcasts entirely in high definition since its inception. The channel broadcasts a wide array of TVE productions to an international audience, entirely in Spanish. Most of its target audience is concentrated in Latin America. In addition to TV series, it also airs factual programming concerning the social diversity of Spain. It launched a test service on 1 August 2015, becoming official on 18 January 2016.

== History ==
Coinciding with the 25th anniversary of TVE Internacional, RTVE started broadcasting a new channel called Star HD in early August 2015 (initially running on an eight-hour programming wheel), targeting the Americas. From the definitive launch in the first semester of 2016, the channel would be encrypted, like TVE Internacional and 24h, and distributed to pay-TV companies in the Americas.

The attractive point of its channel were its series which only aired at least once on TVE Internacional, and in native HD. At the time of NATPE 2016, in mid-January 2016, the channel attracted interest from cable companies in Argentina, Chile, Central America, Puerto Rico and the United States. In an initial phase, the channel only aired a promotional eight-hour wheel.

On 20 August 2019, it launched in Switzerland through UPC Cablecom (now Sunrise) and in France on Free Telecom. On 16 September of that year, the channel arrived to Luxembourg through POSTTV, owned by Post Luxembourg. The negotiations were mediated by Alteox.

On 6 April 2022, as part of a strategic plan at MIPTV 2022, RTVE announced that it would start selling the channel to Africa while also strengthening the penetration of its main international channel there. In July that year, it launched on Movistar TV in Peru.
