= RTVE =

Spanish state-owned public corporation

- Logo used since 2008

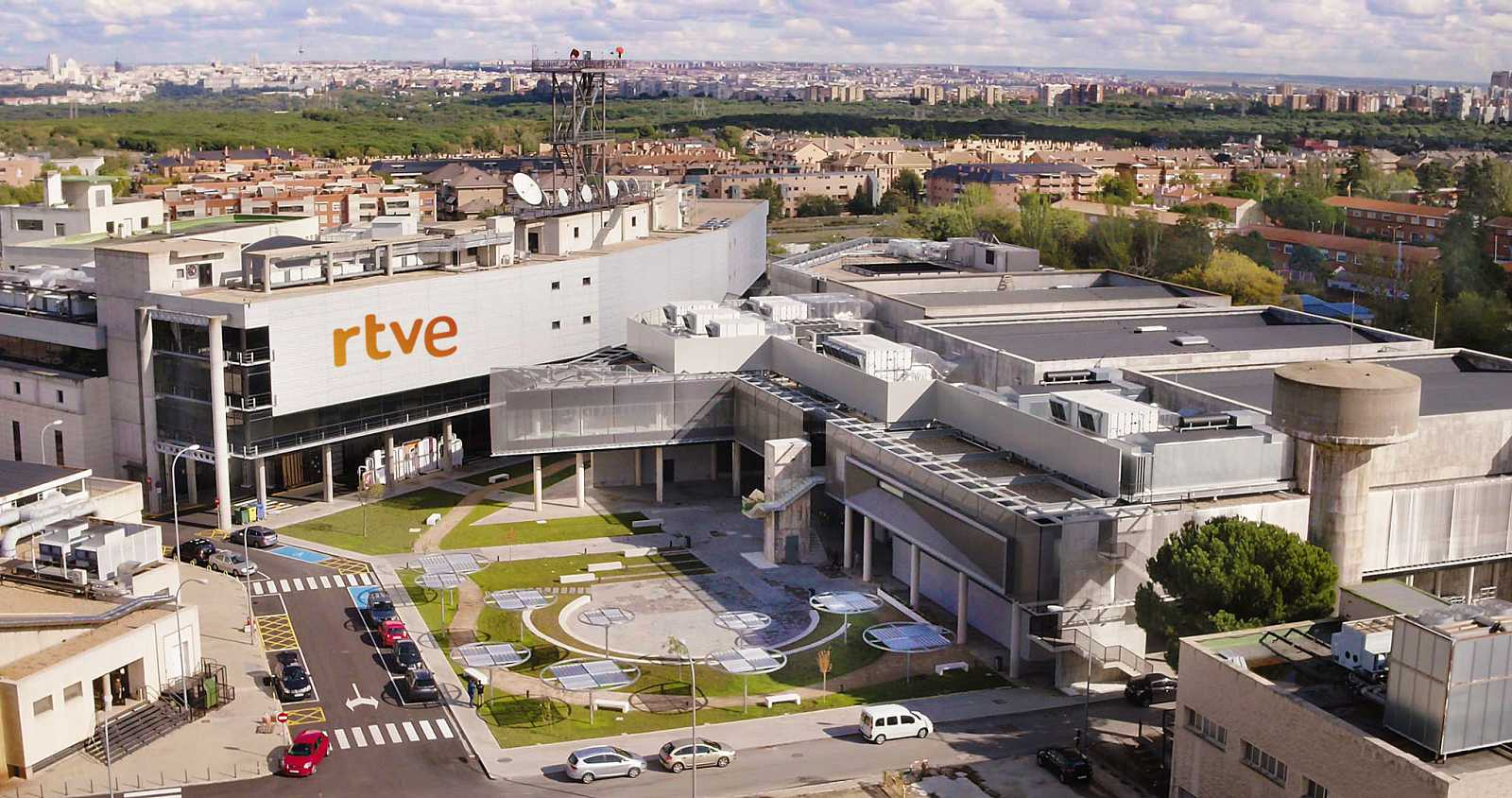
- RTVE headquarters (2020)
- Trade name: Radiotelevisión Española
- Type: Sociedad Anónima; Sociedad mercantil estatal
- Industry: Mass media
- Genre: Public service broadcasting
- Founded: 11 October 1973; 53 years ago (as Centralised Public Service); 1 January 2007; 19 years ago (as Corporation)
- Headquarters: Prado del Rey, Pozuelo de Alarcón, Spain
- Key people: José Pablo López (chair)
- Services: Television; Radio; Internet
- Revenue: ▲€1.25 billion (2024)
- Net income: ▲ (€12.8 million) (2024)
- Total assets: ▲€1.52 billion (2024)
- Owner: SEPI
- Number of employees: ▲6,770 (2024)
- Divisions: Televisión Española; Radio Nacional de España; RTVE.es; RTVE Instituto; Orchestra and Choir
- Website: rtve.es

Corporación de Radio y Televisión Española (Spanish: [koɾpoɾaˈθjon de ˈraðjoj teleβiˈsjon espaˈɲola]; lit. transl. Spanish Radio and Television Corporation), known as Radiotelevisión Española (acronym RTVE), is the Spanish national radio and television public broadcaster. It provides multi-station television (Televisión Española) and radio services (Radio Nacional de España), as well as online and streaming services (RTVE Play).

The current corporation is a state-owned enterprise formed in 2007 to succeed the Ente Público Radiotelevisión Española (RTVE Public Entity). Since the entry into force of the RTVE Financing Act of 2009, RTVE is primarily funded by a combination of subsidies from the General State Budget and a fee levied on the private agents' gross revenue (3.0% for private free-to-air channels, a 1.5% for private subscription channels and a 0.9% for telecom companies).

RTVE is a full member of the European Broadcasting Union (EBU). The corporation's central headquarters, Prado del Rey, are located in Pozuelo de Alarcón.

== History ==
=== Precedents ===
Spanish state-wide public broadcasting services have undergone numerous restructurings and reorganisations throughout its history, and have assumed several identities. Their history may be traced back to the first radio broadcasts of Radio Nacional de España (RNE) from Salamanca, developed as a propaganda tool for the Rebel faction during the Spanish Civil War. RNE was founded on 19 January 1937 and was subservient to the State Delegation for Press and Propaganda led by Vicente Gay Forner.

Throughout the Francoist dictatorship, the national radio service depended successively on the FET y de las JONS's Vice-Secretariat for Popular Education (VSEP), on the Ministry of National Education (since 1945) and on the Ministry of Information and Tourism, since the creation of the latter in 1951. In July 1945, in the wake of the transfer of responsibilities over Press and Propaganda to the Ministry of National Education, radio broadcasting became a standalone directorate general: the Dirección General de Radiodifusión ('Directorate General for Radio Broadcasting').

After some time on trial, the first regular Televisión Española (TVE) signal was broadcast on 28 October 1956 from the Paseo de la Habana in Madrid, reaching the roughly 600 television receivers existing in the city at the time. On 11 October 1973, the two networks for respectively radio and television broadcasting, RNE and TVE, were consolidated into the Servicio Público Centralizado Radiotelevisión Española ('RTVE Centralised Public Service'). Up until the 1980s, with the creation of regional broadcasters ETB and TV3, TVE held the monopoly on television broadcasting in the country.

Further consolidations followed in 1977, at which time RTVE became an organismo autónomo. In 1979, TVE and RNE were joined by Radiocadena Española (RCE), an old radio service that, unlike RNE, could broadcast commercials. Under the purview of the 1980 Statute of the Radio and Television, the public broadcasting services were configured as a legal public entity (ente público) with its own jurisdiction, the Ente Público Radiotelevisión Española. The former cinema newsreels service NO-DO was merged into RTVE to be dismantled in 1981. Since then, the NO-DO archives are property of RTVE and its conservation is in their hands and Filmoteca Española's. In 1989, RCE was dismantled and its radio service was merged into RNE.

=== RTVE Corporation ===
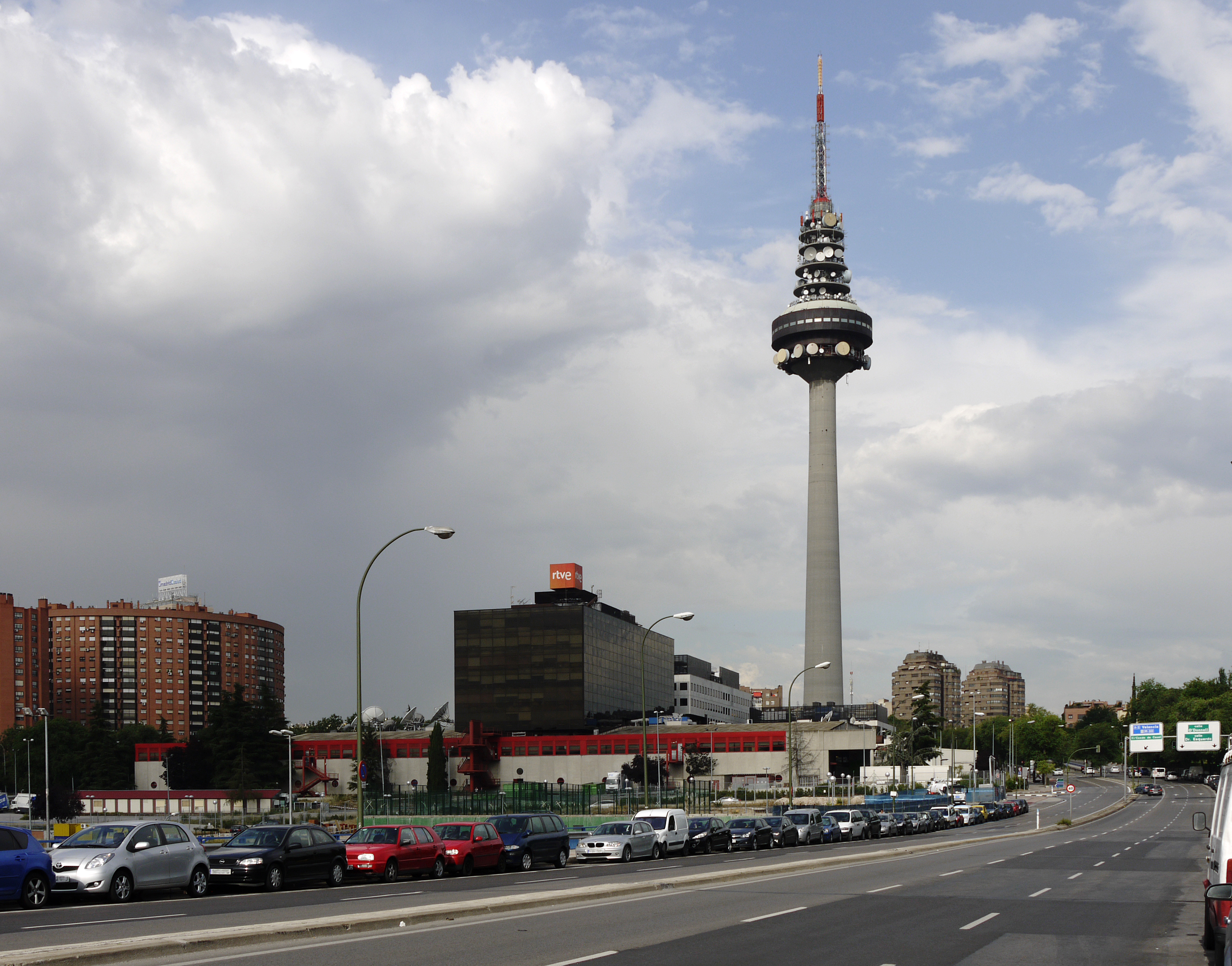
TVE's central news services are located at the foot of Torrespaña. The tower was inaugurated in 1982 and belonged to TVE until 1989.

In accordance with the Law of State Radio and Television of 5 June 2006, and in the face of an enormous deficit, the RTVE Public Body and the companies TVE, S.A. and RNE, S.A. were dissolved, and on 1 January 2007, Corporación RTVE came into existence. RTVE was thus constituted as a fully autonomous sociedad mercantil estatal, assuming the corporate form of a sociedad anónima fully participated by the State. For the first time, the chair of the public broadcasting services was appointed by the Cortes Generales (the legislative) rather than by the Government of Spain (the executive), as it had been previously the case with the directors-general of the ente público and the servicio público de radiodifusión.

As part of the 2007 restructuring, a controversial plan was implemented to reduce the workforce by 4,855 through attrition and retirement incentives.

In 2012 political tensions associated with the austerity policies enacted by the ruling right-leaning People's Party (PP) resulted in departures of personnel, which were interpreted by interviewed journalists as an effort to purge critical political comment from RTVE's content. In 2012 the PP began staffing RTVE with party veterans. Considerable controversy was caused when Ana Pastor was fired.

On 11 June 2013, RTVE was one of the few known European broadcasters to condemn and criticize the closure of Greece's state broadcaster ERT.

In December 2018, RTVE launched a web with Filmoteca Española, which is available via Internet with more than 4000 videos of Spanish films and documentaries.

Amid the inability to reach a parliamentary agreement for the renovation of the administration board of RTVE, Rosa María Mateo was appointed as Provisional Sole Administrator in July 2018. In February 2021, the renovation was unblocked and José Manuel Pérez Tornero was shortlisted as the future chairman of the corporation. Thus, the new board was constituted on 26 March 2021.

In October 2021, the corporation's decision to deny a travel of a group of RTVE journalists to Tindouf to attend an event organised by the Polisario Front and thus be presumably able to interview Brahim Ghali stirred controversy and led to the renunciation of both TVE and RNE heads of the international informative services.

RTVE did not participate or broadcast the Eurovision Song Contest 2026, after 65 years of uninterrupted Spanish participation, because the Israeli Public Broadcasting Corporation was allowed to participate despite the behavior of its delegation and the interference of the Israeli government in the preceding contests, and the Israeli offensive in the Gaza war.

=== Corporate identity ===
From 1973 to 1991

From 1991 to 2008

Since 2008

== Services ==
=== Television ===
TVE

RTVE's television service comes under its Televisión Española (TVE) division. Although almost all the programming of its channels is in Spanish and is the same for all of Spain, TVE has territorial centers in every autonomous community and produces and broadcasts some local programming in regional variations in each of them in the corresponding co-official language such as the broadcast of Catalan-language segments for Catalonia produced in its production center in Sant Cugat del Vallès.

The domestic offer provided by TVE through the digital terrestrial television comprises two generalist channels (La 1 and La 2) and three thematic channels: Teledeporte (sports programming), 24 Horas (news), and Clan (children's programming). All available only in high-definition in 1080i, except for La 1 that is also available in ultra-high-definition in 4K resolution.

Regarding international broadcasting, TVE provides TVE Internacional, 24h Internacional, Star and Clan Internacional.

=== Radio ===

RTVE's radio stations come under its Radio Nacional de España (RNE) division. RNE has also territorial centers in every autonomous community and produces and broadcasts some local programming in regional variations in each of them.

The domestic offer provided by RNE includes the following radio stations: Radio Nacional (generalist radio station), Radio Clásica (classical music), Radio 3 (cultural and alternative programming aimed at young people), Ràdio 4 (Catalan-language station broadcast in Catalonia and Andorra), and Radio 5 (24-hour radio news station).

Radio Exterior (REE) is the RNE's international broadcasting service on short wave, with an audience of eighty million listeners (surpassed only by the BBC and Vatican Radio). This station is also transmitted via DAB for Spain and by satellite. Besides Spanish, REE also transmits programming in French, Arabic, Ladino, Portuguese, Russian, and English.

=== Internet ===
The online website's logo

Logo of one of the online services, RTVE Play is a free streaming service.

RTVE's online portal is located at 'rtve.es'. The website is managed by RTVE's Interactive Media department (Interactivos RTVE). It hosts the corporation's over-the-top media service, RTVE Play, which replaced the old 'RTVE a la carta' in June 2021, adding additional features. RTVE streams content in the Americas on the 'RTVE Play+' pay subscription service.

Besides the catalogue from the RTVE Archive, it allows users to listen and watch live feeds of the network's radio and television stations, as well as original programming from Playz, a hub of streaming content aimed towards a young audience. The RTVE.es portal also features blogs and news stories.

=== Other ===
RTVE is also responsible for the RTVE Instituto and the RTVE Symphony Orchestra and Choir. RTVE (as RNE) was admitted to full active membership of the European Broadcasting Union in 1955. TVE joined the Eurovision Network in 1960. The corporation has contributed to the production of more than 300 films, many of which have received awards at international film festivals around the world. From 1979 to 1987, a second radio network known as Radiocadena Española was also a part of RTVE. RCE stations, unlike RNE, showed advertising. RCE was merged into RNE between 1987 and 1989. NO-DO was also merged into RTVE in 1980. Since NO-DO's closure in 1982, RTVE and Filmoteca Española are responsible for maintaining NO-DO's archives.

== Management ==
Pursuant to the 2006 Law of State Radio and Television, management of the national public service is entrusted to Corporación RTVE. The Board (Consejo de Administración) of the RTVE is the main body of RTVE, and appoints the executive officers of RTVE and its companies, approves its organisation, and approves most major activities. The Board is composed of twelve members; eight members are chosen by Congress and four by the Senate, each by two-thirds majority and each for a non-renewable mandate of six years, and two members appointed by Congress must be proposed by the two main trade unions at RTVE.

The chair has operational control of day-to-day operations, in order to execute the decisions and guidance of the Board. The chair is appointed by, and may be dismissed by, Congress. Before the 2006 Act, this position was filled by the role of the Director General, which had a de facto total control of RTVE. In practice, the Director General had been chosen by the Government for their political profile.

Corporación RTVE is described as a "state mercantile society" (sociedad mercantil estatal) with special autonomy and independence from the government and the general state administration, and it performs its functions through Televisión Española (TVE) and Radio Nacional de España (RNE).

Most staff are civil servants. The News Council is an internal supervisory body composed of RTVE journalists with the aim of safeguarding RTVE's independence.

The current RTVE board, constituted on 2 December 2024, is chaired by José Pablo López.

== Funding ==
Since the entry into force of the Ley de Financiación de RTVE in 2009, RTVE is primarily funded by a combination of subsidies from the General State Budget and a fee levied on the private agents' gross revenue (3.0% for private free-to-air channels, a 1.5% for private subscription channels and a 0.9% for telecom companies).

As of 2021, a preliminary draft for the Ley General de Comunicación Audiovisual reportedly foresees the extension of the 1.5% fee on gross revenues to international streaming platforms offering services in Spain (such as Netflix, HBO, Disney+, Amazon Prime Video or YouTube) and the drop of the 0.9% fee for telecom companies. However, the latter will continue contributing in terms of the fee levied for the occupation of the spectrum. RTVE will also be able to monetize limited forms of advertising, such as sponsorships and advertising in its international channels.

== Bibliography ==
- Pérez Gómez, Alberto (2007). Nikoltchev, Susanne (ed.). Iris Special: The Public Service Broadcasting Culture. Strasbourg: European Audiovisual Observatory. ISBN 978-92-871-6188-8.
- Ruiz de Apodaca Espinosa, Ángel María (2009). "El régimen jurídico de la nueva corporación de RTVE" (PDF). Revista Digital Facultad de Derecho (1). ISSN 1989-6085.
