= Onna (disambiguation) =

Onna is a Local Government Area in Akwa Ibom State, Nigeria.

Onna may also refer to:

- Onna (L'Aquila), a town in Abruzzo, Italy
- Onna, Okinawa, Japan
- Onna, Hampshire, England, UK

== People with the given name ==
- Onna White (1922–2005), Canadian choreographer and dancer

== See also ==
- Ona (disambiguation)
- Onna-musha, a type of female warrior belonging to the Japanese upper class
