= Šest dana juna =

Soundtrack album by Idoli
- Released: July 12, 1985
- Recorded: June 1984 – April 1985
- Genre: Rock, chanson, folk, blues
- Length: 31:09
- Label: Jugoton

Idoli chronology
Čokolada (1983)	Šest dana juna (1985)

Professional ratings
Review scores
Source	Rating
Džuboks	Unfavorable

Šest dana juna is the soundtrack album for the movie with the same title. It was the last release by Serbian new wave band Idoli. The album was not a commercial success as fans were expecting a new release, which did not come out as the group disbanded.

== History ==
After the Ljubljana show in 1984 Idoli decided to split up. In the meantime, Jugoton asked Vlada Divljan to work with Idoli on the soundtrack album for Dinko Tucaković's movie Šest dana juna. Divljan agreed to write the music, but he insisted to record it separately from other Idoli members who would record their parts.

The album was released in 1985 and credited as an Idoli album. The musicians involved with the project were Idoli members Srđan Šaper (vocals), Kokan Popović (drums), both bassists Zdenko Kolar and Branko Isaković and guests Piko Stančić and Boban Đorđević (both on drums), keyboardists Đorđe Petrović and Dragan Ilić, guitarist Dragomir Mihajlović Gagi and saxophonist Vuk Vujačić. The script demanded one chanson and one folk music number, so Mišo Kovač and Jahija Gračanlić (also known as the Cosmic Bosnian) appeared on the album and in the movie with the tracks "Da je duži moj dan" and "Ja je zovem meni da se vrati". The rest of the tracks were Idoli songs except "Samo me gledaj i budi tu", which is a cover of Gilbert Bécaud's hit, “Je t'appartiens.”

Since the movie is set in the 1960s, the band recorded tracks at various locations to get the music similar to the sixties sound. Instrumental tracks on the album are a short acoustic intro "Mala tema filma", "Tema groblja" (which is done in a gothic vocal manner) and "Tema fabrike" (an instrumental version of the Čokolada track "Udri bogataša"), "Ljubavna tema" and "Bluz". The most notable tracks are "Ona to zna" and "Ljubavi" released on a single given away as a present with a copy of Džuboks magazine.

== Track listing ==
All tracks are written by Vlada Divljan.

No.	Title	Length
1.	"Mala tema filma" (Little Movie Theme)	0:26
2.	"Ona to zna" (She Knows That)	2:54
3.	"Samo me gledaj i budi tu" (Just Look At Me And Be There)	2:55
4.	"Znaš da neću da pobegnem" (You Know I Don't Want To Run Away)	3:35
5.	"Tema groblja" (Cemetery Theme)	0:48
6.	"Tema fabrike" (Factory Theme)	1:21
7.	"Ja je zovem meni da se vrati" (I'm Calling Her Back To Me)	3:33
8.	"Ljubavi" (Hey, Love)	3:33
9.	"Ljubavna tema" (Love theme)	2:36
10.	"A kad te vidim ja" (And When I See You)	2:08
11.	"Da je duži moj dan" (If My Day Was Longer)	3:20
12.	"Bluz" (The Blues)	4:00

== Personnel ==
- Vlada Divljan — guitar, piano, vocals
- Srđan Šaper — vocals
- Mišo Kovač — vocals
- Jahija Gračanlić — vocals on "Ja je zovem meni da se vrati"
- Zdenko Kolar — bass
- Branko Isaković — bass
- Dragomir Mihajlović Gagi — guitar
- Kokan Popović — drums
- Ivan Stančić Piko — drums
- Boban Đorđević — drums
- Đorđe Petrović — keyboards
- Dragan Ilić — keyboards
- Vuk Vujačić — saxophone

== Sources and references ==
- EX YU ROCK enciklopedija 1960-2006, Janjatović Petar; ISBN 978-86-905317-1-4
- Vlada Divljan interview (Serbian)
