= Mass media in Spain =

Spain is home to the second most spoken language in the world, with approximately 427 million native Spanish speakers across 20 countries. As a result, many Spanish media outlets design content with a global audience in mind, anticipating international reach. Despite this, the national market remains the core focus, with media catering not only to Spanish speakers but also to the country's co-official languages—Catalan, Galician, and Basque. Catalan alone is spoken by over 11 million people, while Galician and Basque are spoken by around two million and one million, respectively.

The media sector plays a significant role in Spain's economy, which ranks 12th largest globally. In 2014, the culture sector accounted for 2.5% of the country's Gross Domestic Product (GDP), with book publishing and the press contributing the most economically. The audiovisual and multimedia industries, including television, radio, film, and music, are also major players, collectively accounting for over 27% of the cultural sector's output.

Spanish media ownership is concentrated among a few large corporations, including Atresmedia, Mediaset España, PRISA, and Vocento, which dominate the nationwide market. Additionally, regional media groups such as Grupo Godó, Grupo Zeta, and Corporación Voz de Galicia operate within specific territories, offering a balance between national and regional media representation. This coexistence between large national media conglomerates and smaller regional outlets provides a diverse media landscape.

Despite its broad reach and cultural significance, Spain lags behind other European countries in terms of media regulation and institutional development. Media oversight is predominantly handled by the state and judicial system, which monitors and responds to complaints, often penalizing abusive practices. However, the absence of a robust independent media responsibility framework has been a point of concern when compared to other European nations with more developed media regulation systems.

== Mass media groups ==
Press:

• El Mundo: Madrid-based daily

• El País: Madrid-based daily

• ABC: Madrid-based daily

• La Razón: Madrid-based daily

• La Vanguardia: Barcelona-based daily

• El Periódico de Catalunya: Barcelona-based daily

Television:

• TVE: Public, includes La 1, La 2, 24 Horas, Clan

• Telecinco: National, commercial

• Antena 3: National, commercial

• Cuatro: National, commercial

• La Sexta: National, commercial

Radio:

• RNE: Public, includes Radio Nacional, Radio Clásica, Radio 3, Radio 5

• Cadena SER: Commercial, operates 50+ stations

• Onda Cero: Commercial

• Cadena COPE: Church-controlled

• esRadio: Commercial, national network

News Agencies:

• EFE: Government-owned

• Europa Press: Private

• Colpisa: Private

• Servimedia: Private

Digital Media:

• Webedia Spain: Second-largest publishing group in Spain (2024), managing digital platforms like IGN España, SensaCine, and Trendencias

Note: Many of these media groups operate across multiple mediums and fields, with some, like Prisa and Vocento, holding significant influence in press, television, and digital media. The trend of media convergence is evident, as companies expand their reach across various platforms to cater to a wider audience, such as Webedia Spain’s dominance in digital content

== Magazines ==
Many in Spain read ¡Hola!.

== Newspapers ==
The most widely read newspaper in Spain is El País.

== Internet ==
Spain has a high level of internet connectivity, with over 90% of the population having access to the internet as of 2020. Fixed broadband coverage is also high, with over 80% of the population having access, and mobile broadband coverage is also relatively high, with over 50% of the population having access. There are several providers of fixed and mobile broadband services, including Movistar, Orange, Vodafone, and MÁSMÓVIL. The government of Spain does not generally restrict access to the internet, but there have been complaints about internet censorship related to the narrowing of the definition of fair use. In general, the government respects freedom of speech and press, but there are laws in place to prohibit the dissemination of certain types of information, such as hate speech.

== See also ==
- Censorship in Spain
- Cinema of Spain
- Telecommunications in Spain
- List of Spanish media groups
- Spanish literature
- History of the press in Spain
- Open access in Spain

== Bibliography ==
in English

- Alonso, Paul. Hybrid Alternative Digital-Native Media in Latin America during the Pandemic: Two Peruvian Cases of Entrepreneurial Journalism Hosted from Spain. Journal of Latin American Communication Research, 2022.
- Rosario de Mateo (2004). "Spain". In Euromedia Research Group; Mary Kelly; et al. (eds.). Media in Europe (3rd ed.). SAGE Publications. pp. 224–235. ISBN 978-0-7619-4132-3.
- "Spain: Directory: the Press". Europa World Year Book 2004. Europa Publications. 2004. p. 3902+. ISBN 1857432533. (includes broadcasting)
- Ross Eaman (2009). "Spain". Historical Dictionary of Journalism. Scarecrow Press. ISBN 978-0-8108-6289-0.
- Angel Smith (2009). "Press". Historical Dictionary of Spain (2nd ed.). Scarecrow Press. ISBN 978-0-8108-6267-8.
- "Spain", Freedom of the Press, US: Freedom House, 2016, OCLC 57509361

in Spanish

- Juan González Castaño, ed. (1996). La prensa local en la región de Murcia (1706-1939) (in Spanish). Universidad de Murcia. ISBN 84-7684-755-6.
