= Vice-Secretariat for Popular Education =

The Vice-Secretariat for Popular Education (Spanish: Vicesecretaría de Educación Popular; VSEP) was an internal body of FET y de las JONS existing during the early stages of the Francoist dictatorship in Spain. It took over press and propaganda duties in the country from 1941 up until its dissolution in 1945.

== History ==
The Vice-Secretariat for Popular Education was created on 20 May 1941. Its inception dates back to the period when José Luis Arrese helmed the Secretariat-General of FET y de las JONS, with the new body falling under direct control of the Secretariat General. In September 1941, ultracatholic falangist Gabriel Arias Salgado assumed the leadership of the vice-secretariat. This entailed minister Ramón Serrano Suñer losing control over press and propaganda, hitherto dependent on the Ministry of Governance, now falling under control of the single party.

The VSEP, which was hierarchically the matrix of the national delegations for Press, Propaganda, Cinematography and Theatre, and Radio Broadcasting, assumed the powers hitherto dependent on the Ministry of Governance's Under-Secretariat for Press and Propaganda. The scope of the VSEP included mass media (press, publishing, film industry), as well as the censorship within those areas. It also controlled the State-owned media, including the so-called Prensa del "Movimiento" or Red de Emisoras del "Movimiento". Parallel to the decline of the Axis in World War II, the Francoist regime re-formulated press and propaganda. Upon the defeat of Nazi Germany in 1945, and under the purview of a 27 July 1945 decree, the VSEP was thus dissolved, with its operations and services being transferred to the Under-Secretariat for Popular Education, which was part of the Ministry of National Education, dominated by traditional Catholic right elements rather than by pure falangists within the regime. The decree-law was ratified on 31 December by a law coming from the Head of State, even if the incoming leaders for press and propaganda did not swear on their posts until January 1946.
