= Ona to zna =

Single by Idoli

from the album Šest dana juna
- B-side: "Ljubavi"
- Released: 1985
- Recorded: 1985
- Genre: Pop; Rock
- Length: 2:55
- Label: Jugoton
- Songwriter: Vlada Divljan

"Ona to zna" is the fourth and last single by Serbian band Idoli. The single was given as a present with Džuboks magazine issue. The song appeared on the Šest dana juna soundtrack album. A live version of the song appeared on the Vlada Divljan live album Odbrana i zaštita.

== Track listing ==
1. "Ona to zna" (2:55)
2. "Ljubavi" (3:35)

== Personnel ==
- Vlada Divljan (guitar, vocals)
- Srđan Šaper (vocals, backing vocals)
- Zdenko Kolar (bass)
- Branko Isaković (bass)
- Ivan Stančić Piko (drums)
- Boban Đorđević (drums)
- Đorđe Petrović (keyboards)
- Dragan Ilić (keyboards)
- Dragomir Mihajlović Gagi (guitar)
- Vuk Vujačić (saxophone)
