= Radio 5 (Spanish radio station) =

All-news national radio station in Spain

- Spain
- Broadcast area: Spain
- Frequencies: Spain (FM: various, DAB, DVB-T); Worldwide via Satellite

Programming
- Format: All news
- Network: RNE

Ownership
- Owner: RTVE
- Sister stations: Radio Nacional; Radio Clásica; Radio 3 Ràdio 4 Radio Exterior

History
- First air date: 1 January 1989; 37 years ago
- Former names: Radio 5 Todo Noticias (1994–99); Radio 5 Información (2012–13)

Links
- Website: Radio 5

Radio 5 is a Spanish free-to-air radio station owned and operated by Radio Nacional de España (RNE), the radio division of state-owned public broadcaster Radiotelevisión Española (RTVE). It is the corporation's all-news radio station, and is known for its 24-hour rolling news service and its live coverage of breaking news.

It was launched on 1 January 1989 as the first 24-hour rolling radio news service in Spain. It was known as "Radio 5 Todo Noticias" (1994–99) and "Radio 5 Información" (2012–13). It is the only nationwide rolling news radio service in Spain.

Its headquarters and main production center is in Casa de la Radio at Prado del Rey in Pozuelo de Alarcón. Although almost all its programming is in Spanish and is the same for all of Spain, RNE has territorial centers in every autonomous community and produces and broadcasts some local news bulletins in regional variations in each of them in the corresponding co-official language.

== History ==
It began broadcasting on 1 January 1989, following a reorganization of public radio services that took place after the dissolution of Radiocadena Española, and in its early years it included both conventional and local entertainment programming. In 1994, when Jesús Vivanco was director of the station, it adopted the format of a news radio station specializing in public service and current affairs under the name Radio 5 Todo Noticias.

From a June-2016 survey, Radio 5 received 289,000 listeners daily. According to EGM Radio 5, in June 2019 it had 238,000 daily listeners.

== Directors ==
- Jesús Vivanco
- Gabriel Sánchez Rodríguez
- Juan Izquierdo
- Juan Carlos Morales
- Pedro Roncal
- Remedios Villa
- María Luisa Moreno de Viana Cárdenas
- Pedro Carreño
- José María Forte
- Fernando Martín (current)

== Selected frequencies ==
City	FM (MHz)
A Coruña	95.8
Alicante	103.6
Badajoz	99.5
Barcelona	99.0
Bilbao	96.3
Córdoba	99.8
Las Palmas	88.6
Logroño	103.3
Madrid	90.3
Málaga	92.5
Murcia	92.1
Oviedo	99.6
Palma de Mallorca	104.5
Pamplona	95.7
Santander	105.0
Seville	90.0
Valencia	88.2
Valladolid	95.1
Vigo	96.0
Vitoria-Gasteiz	89.4
Zaragoza	100.0

== Former logos ==
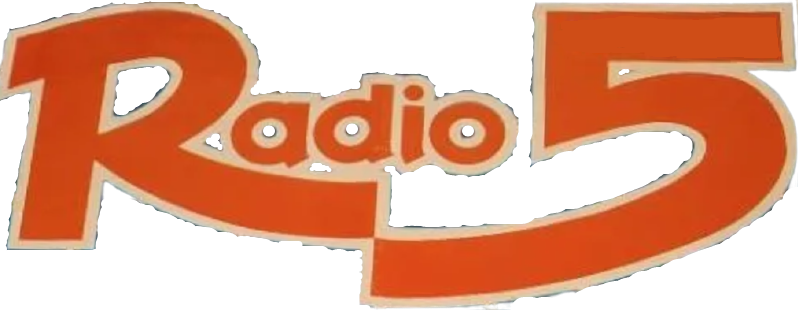
1981–1984

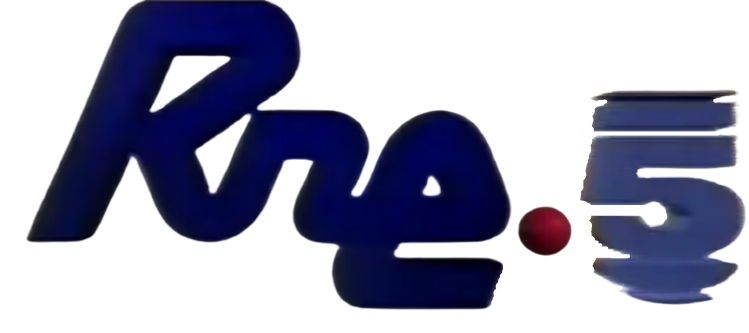
1989–1991

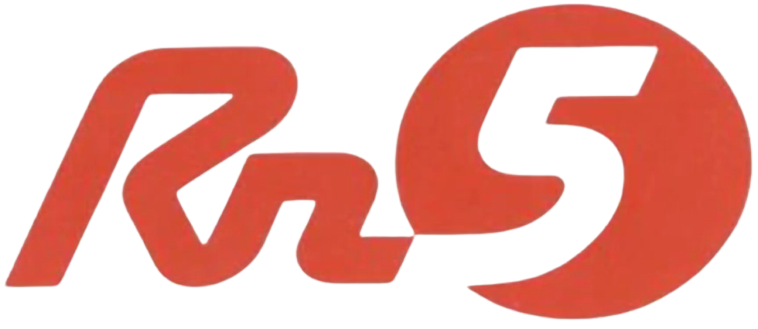
1991–1994

1994–1999

1999–2008

2008–2016

== See also ==
- Radio Nacional de España
- List of radio stations in Spain
