= Radio Nacional de España =

National public-service radio network of Spain

- Logo used as of 2026
- Type: Radio broadcasting
- Country: Spain
- Availability: Spain; Andorra; Worldwide (international station and online)
- Radio stations: Radio Nacional; Radio Clásica; Radio 3; Ràdio 4; Radio 5
- Headquarters: Prado del Rey, Pozuelo de Alarcón (Madrid)
- Parent: Radiotelevisión Española (RTVE)
- Launch date: 19 January 1937; 89 years ago
- International station: Radio Exterior
- Official website: rtve.es/radio

Radio Nacional de España (acronym RNE, branded rne, lit. transl. "National Radio of Spain") is the national state-owned public service radio broadcaster in Spain.

RNE is the radio division and Televisión Española (TVE) is the television division of Radiotelevisión Española (RTVE), the public corporation which has the overall responsibility for the national broadcasting public services under a Parliament-appointed president who, in addition to being answerable to a board of directors, reports to an all-party committee of the national parliament, as provided for in the Public Radio and Television Law of 2006.

RNE launched its first station on 19 January 1937. It is currently headquartered at Casa de la Radio at Prado del Rey in Pozuelo de Alarcón.

== History ==
=== Origins ===
RNE officially came into existence in Salamanca on 19 January 1937, at the height of the Spanish Civil War (1936–39), and was dependent upon the recently created Delegación de Estado para Prensa y Propaganda (State Delegation for Press and Propaganda). The station's studios were in Palacio de Anaya, the headquarters of the Oficina de Prensa y Propaganda (Office for Press and Propaganda), whose first directors were also those of RNE.

RNE's first transmitter, which had a broadcasting power of 20 kW and was constructed by Telefunken, was a gift from the government of the Third Reich to Francoist Spain.

It was at this time that the immense propaganda potential of radio became apparent, and from 14 June 1937 RNE became the nationalists' leading radio station. That distinction had until then been held by Radio Castilla de Burgos, which produced the information and propaganda that all of the radio stations that had fallen into the hands of the nationalist forces were obliged to carry.

=== After the Spanish Civil War ===
On 6 October 1939, at the conclusion of the Spanish Civil War, the leader of the victorious Nationalist forces, General Francisco Franco, issued an order subjecting private radio broadcasting to censorship by the official political party of the state, FET y de las JONS, and furthermore granting RNE the exclusive right to transmit news bulletins.

In consequence, all broadcasters (private as well as public) were obliged to connect twice daily with RNE and re-transmit the government-approved news bulletins produced by the official radio channel. These bulletins, normally broadcast in the early afternoon at 14.30 and in the late evening at 22.00, were officially entitled Diario Hablado, although – given their origin in the war dispatches (partes de guerra) of 1936–1939 and their continued militaristic tone – they were long popularly referred to as El Parte.

The only other sources of information available to radio listeners in Spain at that time were the Spanish-language bulletins broadcast by the BBC and by French Radio from Toulouse, as well as the programmes of Radio España Independiente, which was a radio station established by the Communist Party of Spain in exile in Moscow (although known as La Pirenaica since it was believed to broadcast from a location somewhere in the Pyrenees).

Although from the time of the Civil War there had already been foreign broadcasts in various languages, it was not until April 1945 that the installation of the central short wave transmitter at Arganda del Rey (Madrid) would provide 40 kW of broadcasting power, which was very strong for this period. Foreign broadcasting thus acquired a great importance, with transmissions (in Spanish as much as in English) directed especially at America.

In 1940, RNE's headquarters were transferred to Madrid. During this post-Spanish Civil War and early Second World War era – before the Allied arrival in Italy in 1943 and the German retreat from Stalingrad – RNE collaborated with the Axis powers in retransmitting in Spanish news from the official radio stations of Germany and Italy.

It was from this moment on that the slow journey of Spanish public radio began, motivated by the poor quality of the media on the one hand, and the international block on the other which impeded, until 1955, the entry of RNE into the European Broadcasting Union.

The end of the 1950s and beginning of the 1960s saw the introduction of advanced technologies such as frequency modulation (FM) and transmissions in stereo. A parallel commercial channel, Radio Peninsular, was also created.

=== The 1960s and 1970s: a time of growth ===
1964 was the first year of a major restructuring exercise at RNE which was to see the establishment of a network of regional broadcasting centres equipped with powerful 250 to 500 kW mediumwave transmitters. These gave RNE full coverage of not just the national territory but a good part, too, of the rest of Europe (especially at night). The regional transmitters normally all broadcast the same signal, relayed from the main studios in Madrid, although provision was made for them to opt out at certain times of day and transmit regional news from their own local studios. This was the foundation of today's Radio 1 (now Radio Nacional).

In November 1965 RNE opened a second network, using FM transmitters and specializing in music – taking advantage of the superior sound quality offered by this method of transmission. This network eventually became the RNE channel which is today known as Radio Clásica.

In 1971 a new shortwave transmitter was inaugurated at Noblejas in the province of Toledo. Intended for the broadcasting of RNE's external services (now Radio Exterior), this transmitter was much more powerful than its predecessor sited at Arganda del Rey. These services were to undergo a far-reaching reform in 1975 when broadcasts in Russian and other Slavic languages, directed at audiences behind the "Iron Curtain", were withdrawn in favour of programmes intended for Spaniards and other Spanish-speaking people abroad.

=== The democratic era ===
The arrival of democracy to Spain after the death of Franco in 1975 produced several changes. One of these was the end, on 25 October 1977, of the private broadcasters' obligation to connect with RNE for the transmission of daily news bulletins. From then on, each broadcaster was free to determine the content of its own news programmes.

By the end of the 1970s, the broadcasts of Tercer Programa (now Radio 3), which until then had only been transmitted in Madrid, were extended to the whole of Spain. RNE 3 offered educational and cultural programming, which was enlarged to include programmes on musical themes.

Throughout Francoist Spain a number of semi-official radio stations (autorizadas) had functioned in parallel with the private broadcasters and RNE, and belonged to organisations such as Confederación Nacional de Sindicatos (National Confederation of Trade Unions), Movimiento, and Organización Juvenil Espanola (The Spanish Youth Organisation). These stations were merged in 1978 into Radiocadena Española (Spanish Radio Network). However, some of the transmitters had to be closed down because their frequencies were not included in those assigned to Spain in the international agreements covering the distribution of the radio broadcasting spectrum. Radiocadena Española was merged in 1988 into Radio Nacional de España to form Ràdio 4 (broadcasting in Catalan) and Radio 5 (All-news radio station broadcasting in Spanish).

=== RNE today ===
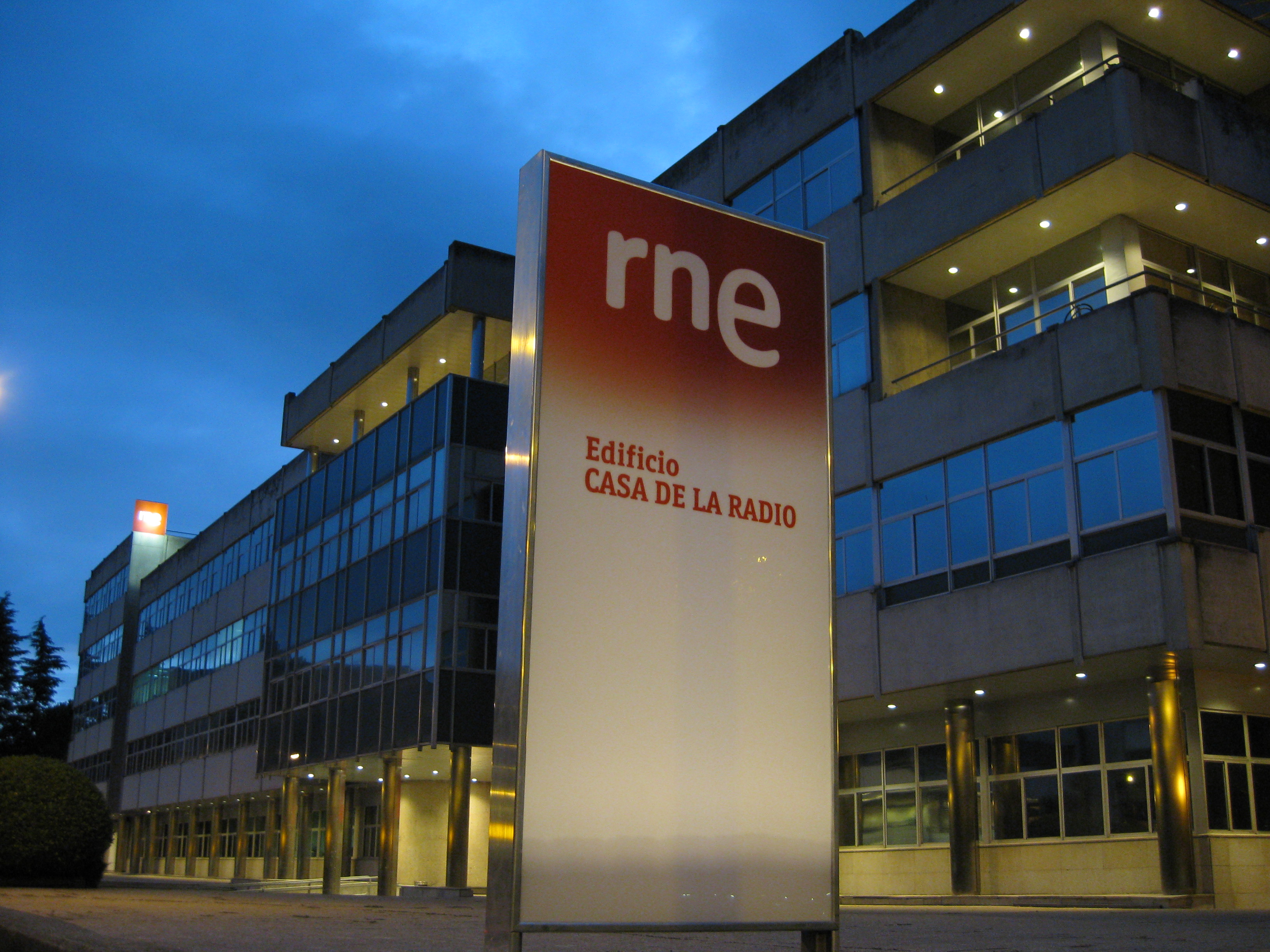
RNE's central studios, Casa de la Radio (Radio House) at Prado del Rey, Pozuelo de Alarcón (Madrid).

In 1989, Radiocadena Española and Radio Nacional were combined to produce the current format of six themed radio channels:

- Radio Nacional (previously Radio 1) – Generalist channel with a broad spectrum of mostly speech-based programming.
- Radio Clásica (previously Radio 2) – Concerts and classical music in general.
- Radio 3 – RNE's "youth station", concentrating on pop, rock, world music, folk, and related cultural events.
- Ràdio 4 – Regional broadcasting in the Catalan language.
- Radio 5 – 24-hour news.
- Radio Exterior – International broadcasting service on short wave, with an audience of 80 million listeners (surpassed only by the BBC and Vatican Radio). This station is also transmitted via DAB for Spain and by satellite. Transmissions are in Spanish, French, Arabic, Ladino, Portuguese, Russian and English.

These stations are also available online and via podcast (see External Links below).

Integrated into the state public broadcasting body RTVE (Radiotelevisión Española) in 1973, RNE today has been assigned the role of "state public radio service, which is an essential service for the community and for the cohesion of democratic societies".

Like its television broadcasting sister organisation, TVE, Radio Nacional is wholly financed by public funds and does not air commercials in its programming.

In January 2012, RNE celebrated its 75th anniversary in the presence of Felipe, Prince of Asturias and Princess Letizia.

On 17 November 2025, RNE announced their intend to shut down their medium wave transmitters before 31 December due to low audience, as well as the economic cost and "the need for a technological evolution", investing further into the DAB+ system.

== Logo history ==
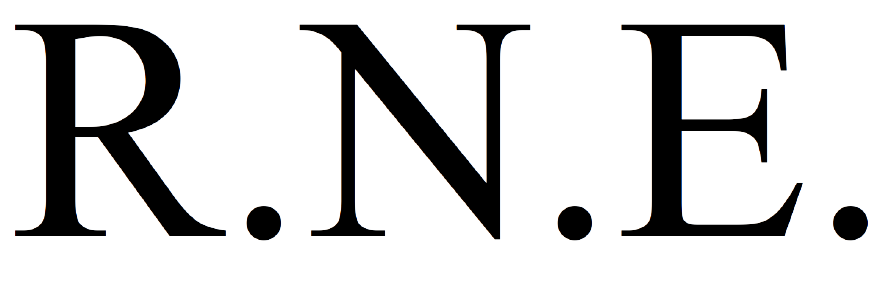
Logo of Radio Nacional de España (RNE) between the official birth of TVE in 1956 and 1962.

Logo of RNE between the change of RTVE logo in 1962 and 1971.

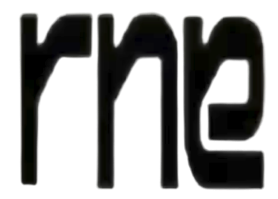
Logo of RNE between 1971 and 1976.

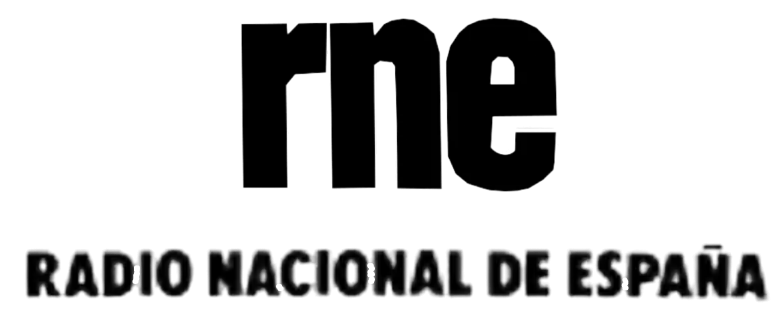
Logo of RNE between 1971 and 1976.

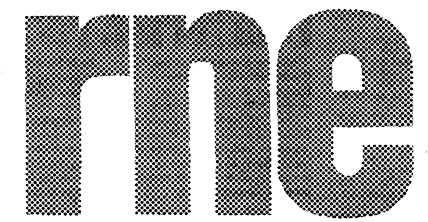
Logo of RNE between 1976 and 1980.

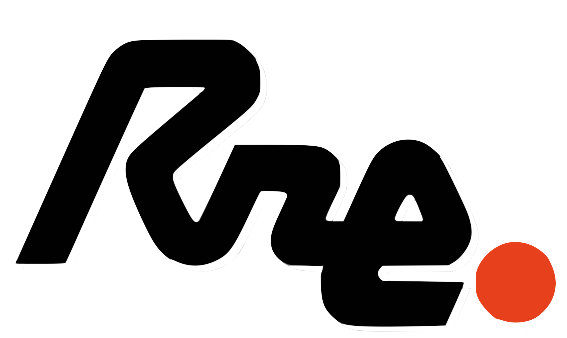
Previous logo, used between 1980 and 2008.

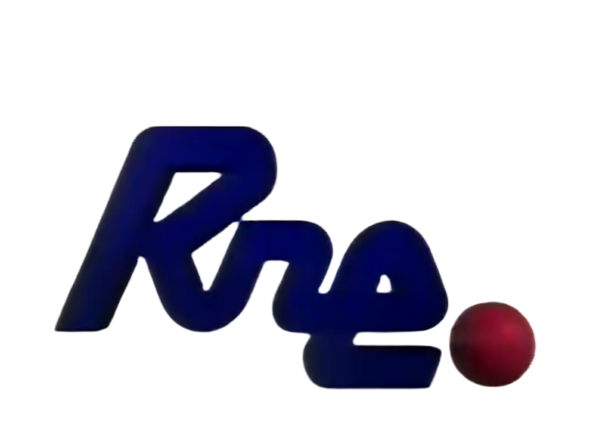
Blue version of the logo, used during the unification of the image of RNE radios, between 1989 and 1991

Current logo of RNE, used since 2008

=== Station logos ===
Radio Nacional de España (RNE) station logos in 2008

Radio Nacional

Radio Clásica

Radio 3

Ràdio 4

Radio 5

Radio Exterior

== See also ==
- List of radio stations in Spain
