= Radio Nacional (Spanish radio station) =

Spain
- Broadcast area: Spain
- Frequencies: FM: various DAB; DVB-T; Satellite

Programming
- Language: Spanish
- Format: News, current affairs, sport and talk
- Network: RNE

Ownership
- Owner: RTVE
- Sister stations: Radio Clásica; Radio 3 Ràdio 4 Radio 5 Radio Exterior

History
- First air date: 19 January 1937; 89 years ago
- Former names: RNE (1937–1988); RNE 1 (1988–1999); Radio 1 (1999–2008)

Links
- Website: rtve.es/radio

Radio Nacional is a Spanish free-to-air radio station owned and operated by Radio Nacional de España (RNE), the radio division of state-owned public broadcaster Radiotelevisión Española (RTVE). It is the corporation's flagship radio station, and is known for broadcasting mainstream and generalist programming, including news bulletins, current affairs, sports and entertainment.

It was launched on 19 January 1937 as Franco's official radio under the department of propaganda during the Spanish Civil War. The station was initially simply referred to as "Radio Nacional de España". It received other names, such as "RNE 1" from 1988 until 1999 and "Radio 1" from 1999 until 2008 when it adopted its current name "Radio Nacional".

== Broadcasting ==
Its headquarters and main production center is in Casa de la Radio at Prado del Rey in Pozuelo de Alarcón. Although almost all its programming is in Spanish and is the same for all of Spain, RNE has territorial centers in every autonomous community and produces and broadcasts some local programming in regional variations in each of them, such as local news bulletins, in the corresponding co-official language.

=== Selected frequencies ===
City	FM (MHz)
A Coruña	100.4
Alicante	105.2
Badajoz	94.9
Barcelona	88.3
Bilbao	100.7
Córdoba	92.2
Las Palmas	92.8
Logroño	102.0
Madrid	88.2
Málaga	106.6
Murcia	101.7
Oviedo	89.4
Palma de Mallorca	90.1
Pamplona	106.1
Santander	96.9
Seville	91.2
Valencia	89.8
Valladolid	97.3
Vigo	90.1
Vitoria-Gasteiz	92.5
Zaragoza	104.4

== Logo history ==
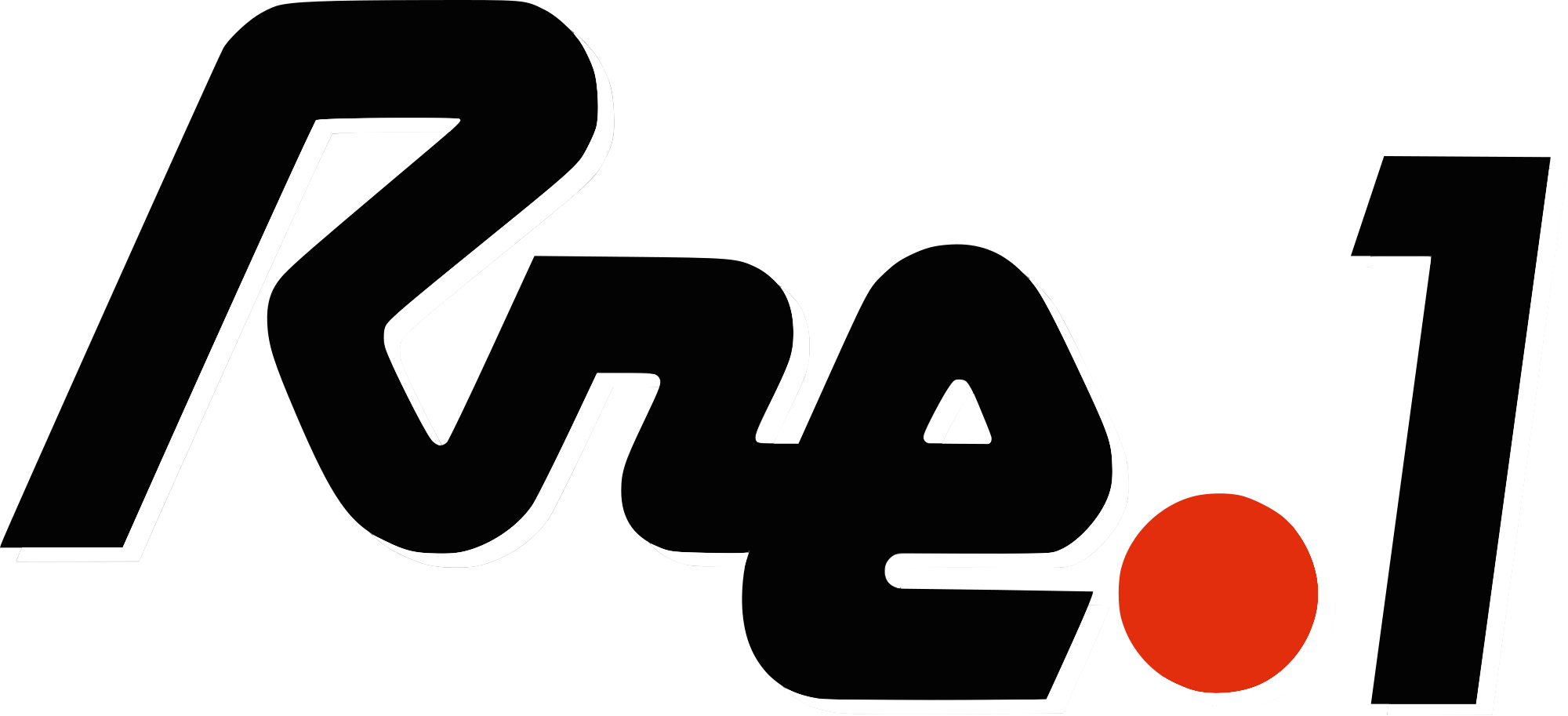
1988–1989, 1991–1999

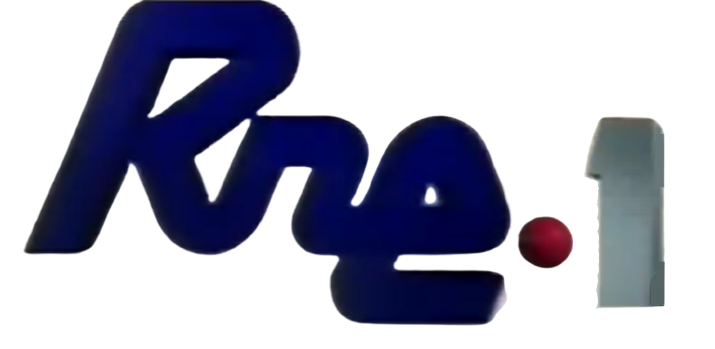
1989–1991

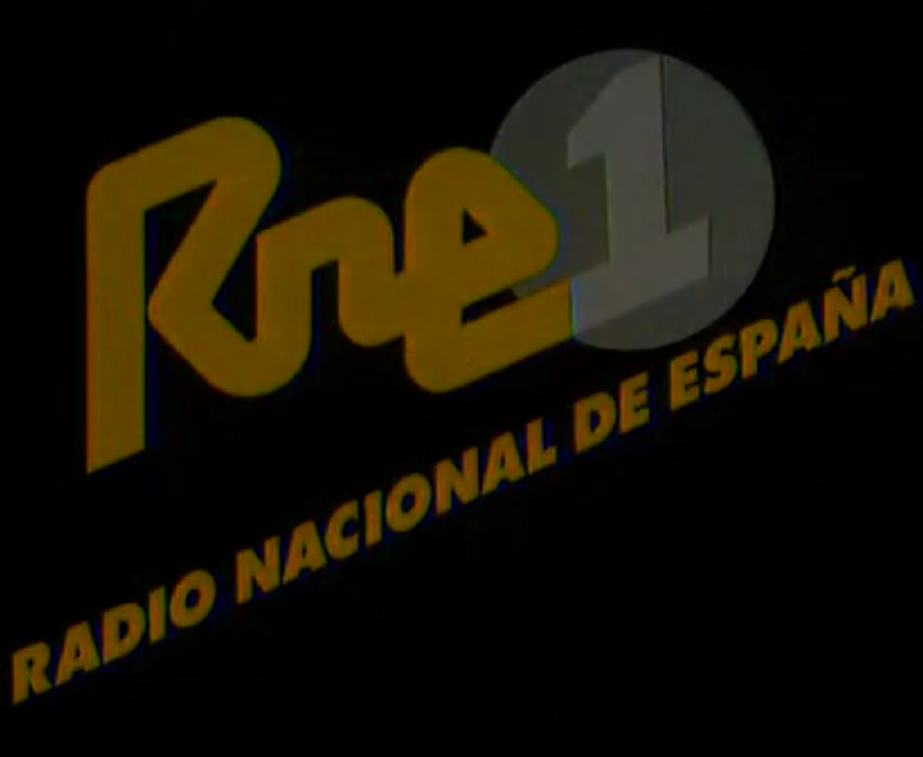
1991

1999–2008

2008–present

== See also ==
- Radio Nacional de España
- List of radio stations in Spain
