= Ona de Sants-Montjuïc =

Radio station in Barcelona

Ona de Sants-Montjuïc is a local radio station in Barcelona city, broadcasting at 94.6 FM. Its also transmits on the Internet.

The station opened as Ona Popular de Sants in 1985 at the Ateneu Popular de Sants as an activity of this cultural association. It is a local and cultural radio station, approved by the Catalan government.
