= Radio 3 (Spanish radio station) =

Spanish national radio network

- Logo used since 2026
- Spain
- Broadcast area: Spain (FM, DAB, DVB-T and Satellite); Andorra

Programming
- Language: Spanish
- Format: Non-mainstream contemporary music and cultural programs
- Network: RNE

Ownership
- Owner: RTVE
- Operator: Tomás Fernando Flores (director since 2012)
- Sister stations: Radio Nacional; Radio Clásica; Ràdio 4 Radio 5 Radio Exterior

History
- First air date: 12 October 1952; 73 years ago (Programa Cultural de RNE en OM); 1 July 1979; 46 years ago (programming block); 1981; 45 years ago (nationwide launch)
- Former names: El Tercer Programa (1967–81)

Links
- Webcast: Listen live, rtve play radio
- Website: rtve.es/radio/radio3/

Radio 3 is a Spanish free-to-air radio station owned and operated by Radio Nacional de España (RNE), the radio division of state-owned public broadcaster Radiotelevisión Española (RTVE). It is the corporation's third radio station, and is known for broadcasting indie, alternative, hip hop and dance music.

== History ==
Radio 3 traces its origins to the Programa Cultural de RNE en OM which was originally launched on 12 October 1952 as a cultural radio station broadcasting only in Madrid and surrounding areas. In 1967, the Programa Cultural was renamed as "El Tercer Programa" (The Third Programme) and began to cooperate with Segundo Programa de RNE on certain programming. Radio 3 later came into being as a nighttime programming block of El Tercer Programa in 1979 and was then renamed as such in 1981, when a new nationwide radio station was created from the ashes of the old El Tercer Programa. It attracts half a million listeners per week.

== Programming ==
Its output mostly centres on indie, alternative, hip hop and dance music that is outside the mainstream scene and the top 40 charts. Additionally, Radio 3 airs other music genres that does not air on commercial radio such as Spanish folk music, flamenco, hip hop, jazz, country, blues, Brazilian music, heavy metal, and new-age music.

Besides music, Radio 3 also features serialised radio drama and collects news from different cultural expressions: literature, film, theater and visual arts, always highlighting and supporting the most innovative and restless in each discipline.

Radio 3's programming is split roughly 70% specialist music and 30% culture-based shows. Hosts have complete autonomy over content and the station does not have any playlists. As such, the nature of Radio 3 broadcasts varies wildly depending on the time of the week.

== Logo history ==
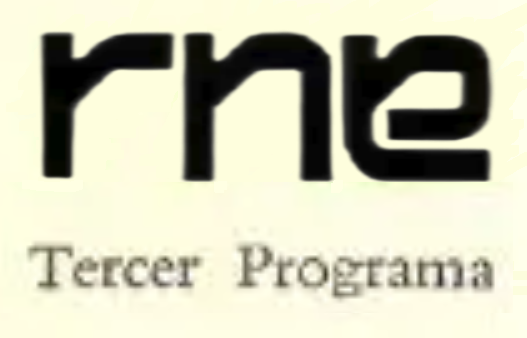
1971 to 1976

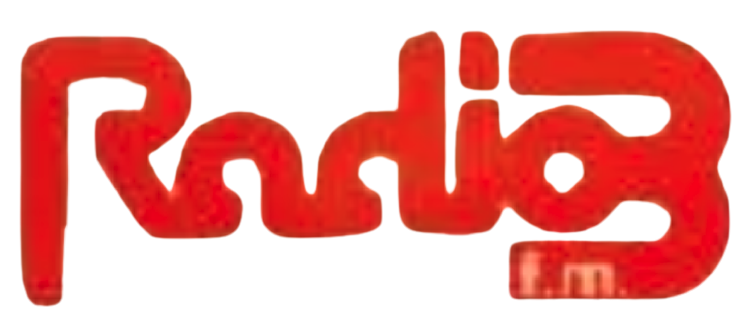
1981 to 1986

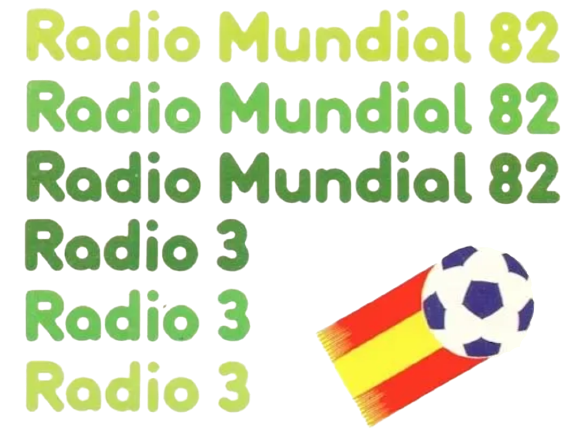
1982

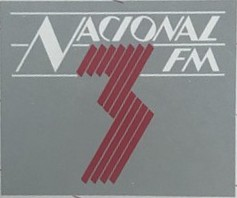
1986 to 1988

1988 to 1989, 1991 to 1999

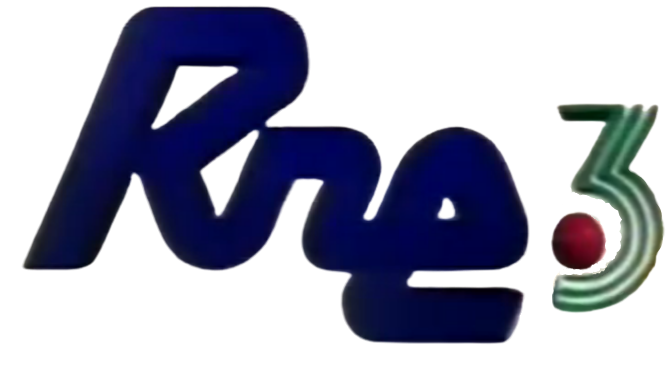
1989 to 1991

1999 to 2008

2008 to 2012

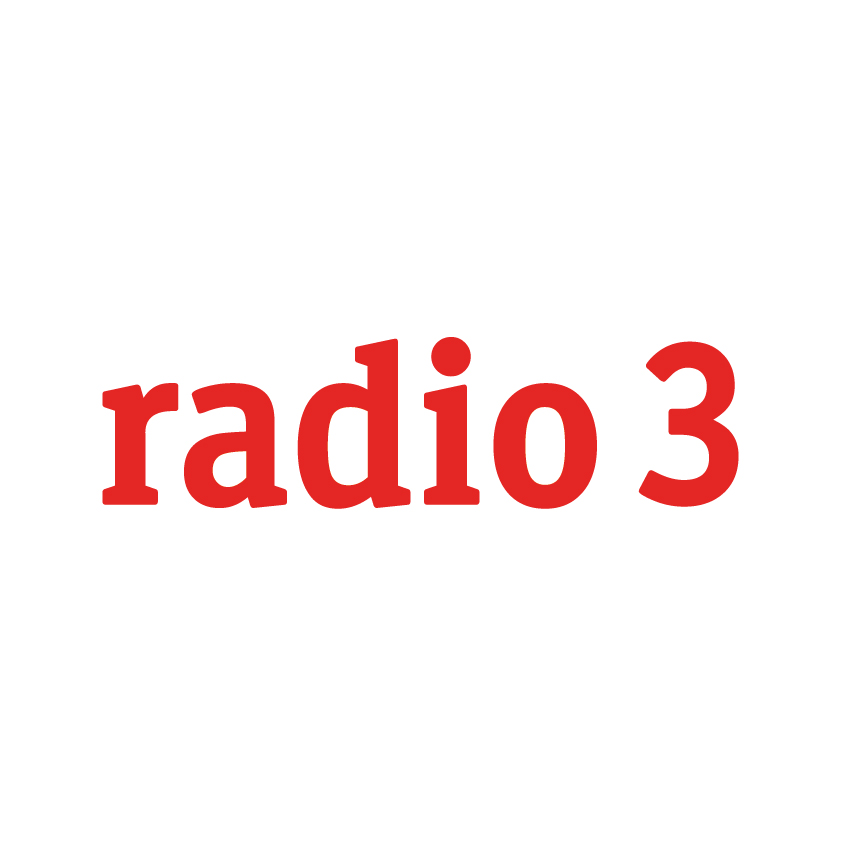
2012 – present

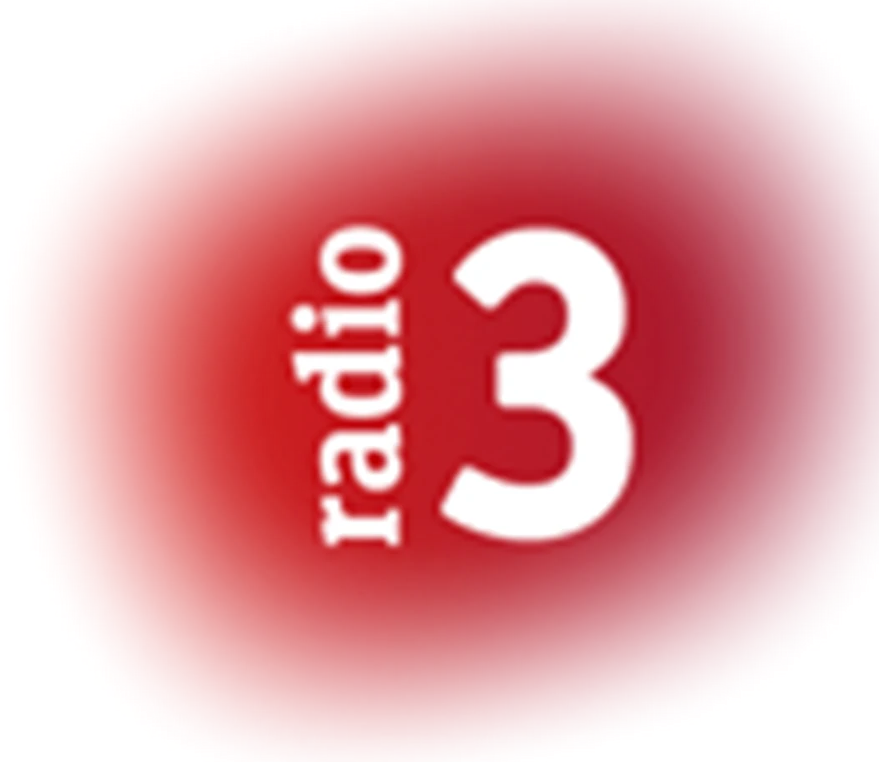
Logo used for online since 2016 to present

== See also ==
- Radio Nacional de España
- List of radio stations in Spain
