= Internet in Spain =

This article is about the Internet in Spain.

In the 2022 Digital Economy and Society Index (DESI), Spain ranked 3rd in Connectivity, supported by its advanced broadband and developing 5G network. The country achieves 5th place in Digital Public Services, reflecting its efficient e-government services. In human capital, Spain is 10th, contending with a shortage of information and communication technology (ICT) specialists and gender disparity in the field. For the Integration of Digital Technology, Spain is ranked 11th, focusing on digital advancement in small and medium-sized enterprises (SMEs).

== History ==
RETD was the first public data network in the world when it became operational in 1972. It evolved into Iberpac.

== User statistics ==
- Internet users: 42.40 million users; 91.0% of the population (2020)
- Fixed broadband: 33.6 million subscriptions, 13th in the world; 83.4% of the population, 37th in the world (2019).
- Mobile broadband: 25.0 million subscriptions, 13th in the world; 53.2% of the population, 24th in the world (2012).
- Internet hosts: 4.2 million hosts, 26th in the world (2012).
- IPv4: 28.4 million addresses allocated, 0.7% of the world total; 604 addresses per 1000 persons (2012).
- Top level domain: .es

== Broadband ==
=== Fixed broadband ===
The adoption of fixed broadband in Spain is 83%, showing a steady increase, particularly in broadband speeds of at least 100 Mbit/s, which have reached 72%. These figures surpass the EU average of 78% for fixed broadband take-up and 41% for broadband speeds of at least 100 Mbit/s. This growth in broadband adoption in Spain is attributed to high market competition and relatively low prices, which were especially impactful during the COVID-19 pandemic, as demand for broadband and pay-TV services increased. Complementing this growth, Spain's investment in telecommunications infrastructure contributes to its strong position. The coverage of Fixed Very High Capacity Networks in 2021 was 94%, exceeding the EU average of 60%. Additionally, Spain's commitment to advanced technology is evident in its Fiber to the Premises (FTTP) coverage, which reached 89%, exceeding the EU average of 34%.

=== Mobile broadband ===
Spain's mobile broadband landscape showed a mixed performance when compared to the EU average. The country reported a mobile broadband adoption rate of 94% among individuals, which is notably higher than the EU average of 87%. However, in the area of 5G coverage, Spain was slightly behind, with a coverage rate of 59%, compared to the EU average of 66%.

== Digital public services ==
The DESI 2022 report ranks Spain fifth in the EU for digital public services, noting an e-government user rate of 73%, which is higher than the EU average of 65%. Digital services for citizens and businesses achieve scores of 87% and 94%, respectively, both exceeding the EU averages of 75% and 82%. Spain's open data usage is reported at 95%, which is above the EU average of 81%.

These achievements align with the goals of the "Digital Spain 2025" strategy, which focuses on digitalizing public administration in the sectors of employment, justice, and social policies. The Plan for the Digitalisation of Spain's Public Administration 2021-2025 elaborates on this, aiming for the digital transformation of state administration and the launch of digital projects. One of the initiatives involves the creation of an app factory, with a dedicated budget of EUR 8.67 million, aimed at making 50% of digital public services accessible via mobile devices by 2025. In healthcare, Spain has prioritized enhancing system interoperability and has implemented a vaccination registry and electronic prescription monitoring system.

== Social media age restrictions ==
In late 2025, the Spanish government announced plans to ban access to social media platforms for users under the age of 16. The announcement was made by Prime Minister Pedro Sánchez, who stated that social media companies would be required to implement mandatory age-verification systems. According to Sánchez, the measure aims to protect children and adolescents from potential harms in the digital environment, which he described as a “digital wild west.” The policy is part of broader efforts by Spain to strengthen online safety regulations for minors and to increase the responsibility of digital platforms. The implementation of the ban is expected to begin in 2026.

== Internet censorship in Spain ==
There are no government restrictions on access to the Internet or, as of 2012, reports that the government monitors e-mail or Internet chat rooms without appropriate legal authority. Complaints about Internet censorship in Spain often focus on chilling effects that come from narrowing the definition of fair use. In 2014, for example, the Spanish version of Google News was shut down as continued operation would have required it to pay fees for each news link that it aggregates.

The constitution provides for freedom of speech and press, and the government generally respects these rights. The law prohibits, subject to judicial oversight, actions including public speeches and the publication of documents that the government interprets as glorifying or supporting terrorism. The law provides that persons who provoke discrimination, hatred, or violence against groups or associations for racist; anti-semitic; or other references to ideology, religion or belief, family status, membership within an ethnic group or race, national origin, sex, sexual orientation, illness, or disability may be punished with imprisonment for one to three years. The constitution prohibits arbitrary interference with privacy, family, home, or correspondence and the government generally respects these prohibitions.

In 2004, the police in Spain arrested ninety people in an operation against the distribution of child pornography.

In February 2008 the editor of a news website, his wife and his daughter received death threats linked to the investigation into a real estate project in which several Murcia politicians and a local businessman were allegedly involved in corrupt practices.

In 2009 the EU Commissioner for Information Society and Media, Viviane Reding, warned Spain against cutting off the Internet access of content pirates without a judicial proceeding. She said, "If Spain cuts off Internet access without a procedure in front of a judge, it would certainly run into conflict with the European Commission" and "Repression alone will certainly not solve the problem of Internet piracy; it may in many ways even run counter to the rights and freedoms which are part of Europe's values since the French Revolution."

In 2012, 16 cases were brought under the law prohibiting publications glorifying or supporting terrorism.

On 13 April 2012, neo-Nazi Marc Mora García was sentenced to two years in prison for spreading ideas and doctrines justifying genocide and promoting discrimination, hate, and violence through a web page.

On 20 April 2012, Madrid-based Radio SER journalist Pilar Velasco was charged with violating confidentiality after posting a secretly-recorded video of a politician online and with refusing to reveal how she came by the video.

In 2014, newspaper El País reported that El Agitador, a satirical blog from Lanzarote, had been ordered to pay €50,000 in three separate proceedings related to satirical cartoons which complained about widespread corruption in the region.

Since January 2015, Vodafone Spain blocks The Pirate Bay as requested by the Ministry of Interior. And since 29 March 2015 the site is blocked on multiple URLs from all ISPs.

On 13 September 2017, the Civil Guard seized referendum.cat, a Catalan website promoting the Catalan independence referendum, pursuant to an order by the High Court of Justice of Catalonia, as the country has considered the referendum to be illegal. The Guard subsequently obtained orders to seize other .cat domains hosting mirrors of the referendum website, and later on 23 September 2017, an order for all ISPs to block any website publicized by Catalan politicians as mirrors of the referendum website. Also censored was an HTTP gateway for the InterPlanetary File System—a distributed file system that had been used to mirror the materials.

On 10 October 2017, the Spanish Civil Guard blocked access to Whats-app groups of several pro-Catalan independence groups.

As of December 2017, all previously blocked sites have once again been unblocked, with the focus shifting to taking the sites down directly.

== See also ==
- Ley Sinde, a provision in Spain's 2011 Sustainable Economy Act designed to address Internet piracy
