= Radio Clásica =

Spanish national classical music radio station

Spain
- Broadcast area: Spain
- Frequencies: FM: various DAB; DVB-T; Satellite

Programming
- Format: Classical music
- Network: RNE

Ownership
- Owner: RTVE
- Sister stations: Radio Nacional; Radio 3 Ràdio 4 Radio 5 Radio Exterior

History
- First air date: 22 November 1965; 60 years ago
- Former names: Segundo Programa (1965–88); RNE 2 (1988–94); RNE C (1994–99)

Links
- Website: Radio Clásica

Radio Clásica is a Spanish free-to-air radio station owned and operated by Radio Nacional de España (RNE), the radio division of state-owned public broadcaster Radiotelevisión Española (RTVE). It is the corporation's second radio station, and is known for broadcasting classical music.

It was launched on 22 November 1965 as the second RNE station. The station was initially simply referred to as "Segundo Programa". It received other names, such as "RNE 2" and "RNE C".

== History ==
Launched in November 1965 as the "Segundo Programa" (second programme) of RNE – and subsequently known as "RNE 2" (1988–94), later still as "RNE C" (1994–99) – Radio Clásica's schedule is made up of presenter-led programmes of classical music (in the widest sense) plus relays (both live and recorded) of concerts, other musical recitals, and complete operas.

The station also showcases such genres as flamenco, folk music, zarzuela and jazz, as well as "established" popular music. It is unusual amongst Spanish radio stations in including no news bulletins in its schedules.

== Current sample programmes ==
- 78 RPM (78 Revolutions per Minute) Tu & Thu 13.00–14.00, repeating on Sa 2.00–3.00

Twice-weekly show devoted to music from 1901 to 1940 (jazz, blues, pop, tango, country, swing, ragtime, chanson, folk...)

- Andanzas (Wanderings) Mo 23.00–00.00

Classic dance and disco music from a wide range of decades

- Ars Sonora Sat 01.00–02.00

Miguel Álvarez-Fernández hosts this weekly cult radio show (on air since 1985) devoted to experimental music and sound art, with special attention to radio art

- Longitud de onda (Wavelength) Mo–Fr 11.00–12.00

Fernando Blázquez and Yolanda Criado explore the answers to different questions in music, science, technology and the relationship between them

- Fila cero (Row zero) Lu & Fr 20.00–22.00, Wed 19.00-22.00, Sat 12.00-14.00 & Su 11.30-14.00

Public concerts recorded live by RNE and the EBU

- Música antigua (Ancient music) Tu 23.00–0.00, replay the next Tu 3.00–4.00

Musical themes from the 8th to the 18th centuries that are often unpopular

- Música viva (Music live) Fr 23.00–0.00

Recordings of newly composed music in live performance

- Archivo de Radio Clásica (Archive of Radio Clásica) We 1.00–2.00

Mikaela Vergara presents a selection of old radio shows from the station's archives

- Solo jazz (Jazz only) Mo, Wed, Fr 0.00–1.00, 13.00–14.00

Jazz music and a study of a different aspect of jazz's development each day

- Sinfonía de la mañana (Symphony in the morning) Mo–Fr 8.00–9.30

A story about the life and work of the great musicians gives way to a musical selection related to a different theme each day

== Selected frequencies ==
| City | FM (MHz) |
|---|---|
| A Coruña | 91.6 |
| Alicante | 99.4 |
| Barcelona | 93.0 |
| Bilbao | 90.6 |
| Córdoba | 97.5 |
| Las Palmas | 95.1 |
| Logroño | 88.5 |
| Madrid | 96.5 |
| Málaga | 98.1 |
| Murcia | 98.2 |
| Oviedo | 96.0 |
| Palma de Mallorca | 87.9 |
| Pamplona | 97.5 |
| Santander | 93.0 |
| Seville | 93.7 |
| Valencia | 106.6 |
| Valladolid | 93.1 |
| Vigo | 92.1 |
| Vitoria-Gasteiz | 96.9 |
| Zaragoza | 92.5 |

== Former logos ==
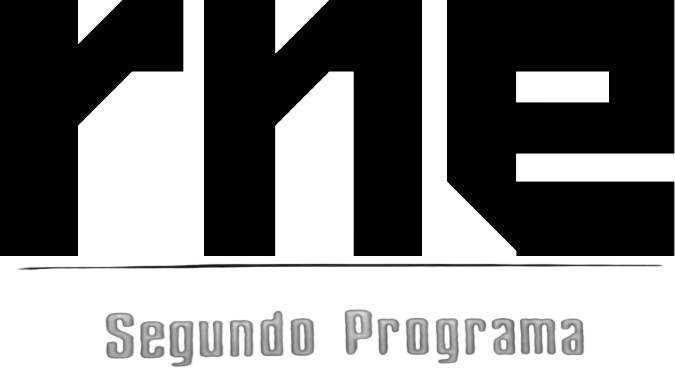
1965–1971

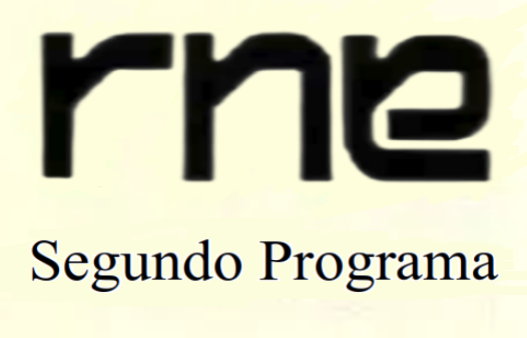
1971–1976

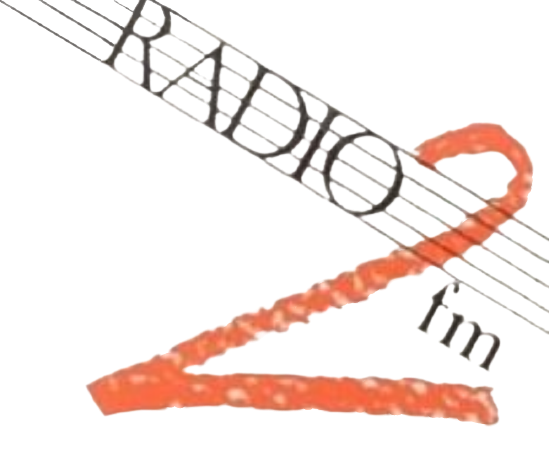
1981–1988

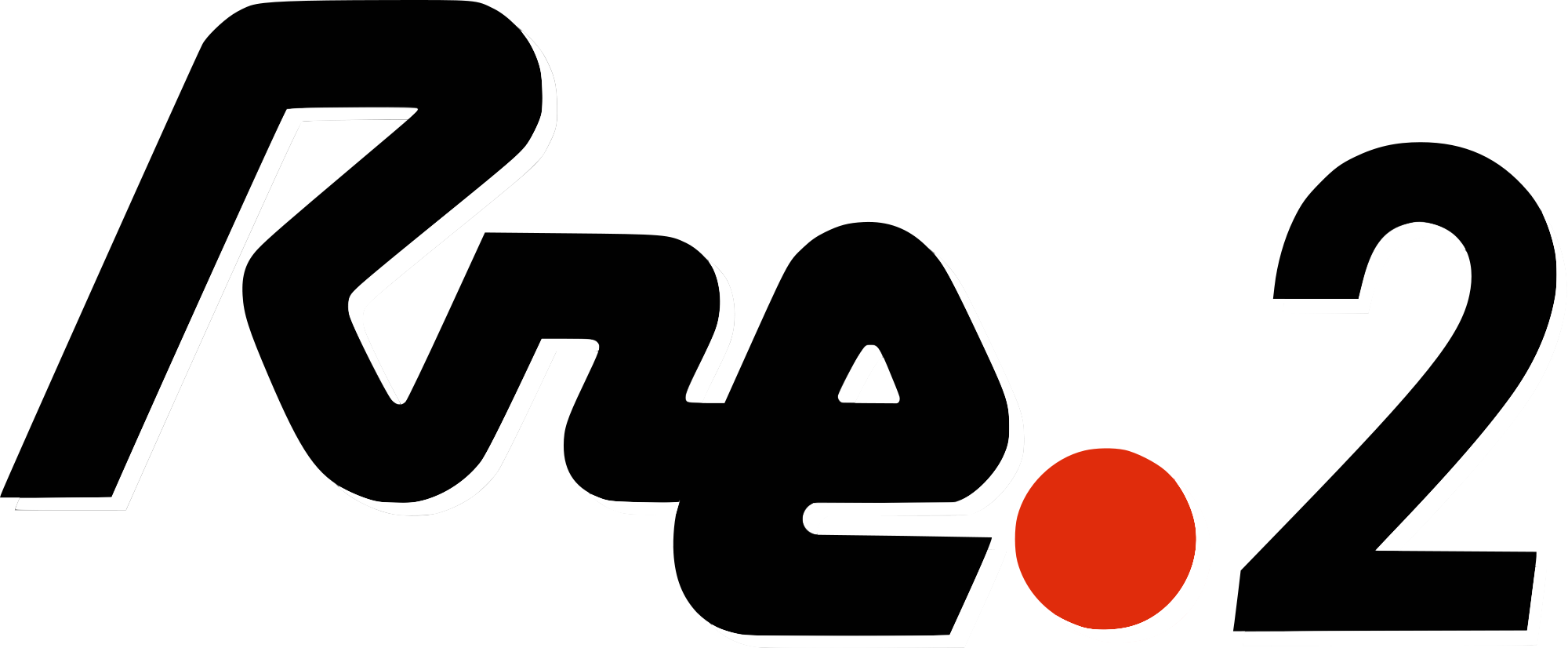
1988–1989, 1991–1994

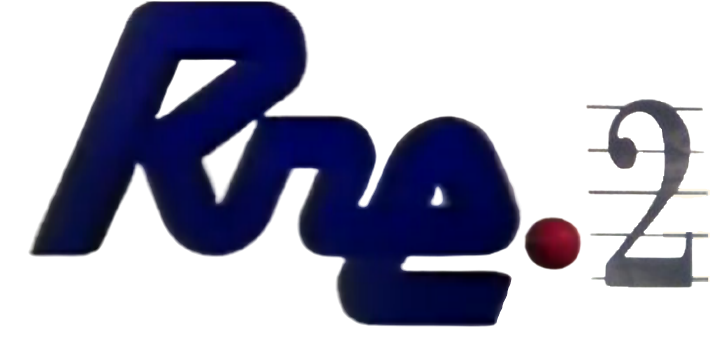
1989–1991

1994–1999

1999–2008

2008–2016

== See also ==
- Radio Nacional de España
- List of radio stations in Spain
