= Prado del Rey (studios) =

RTVE central Headquarters

Coordinates: 40.4107065°N 3.7918232°W

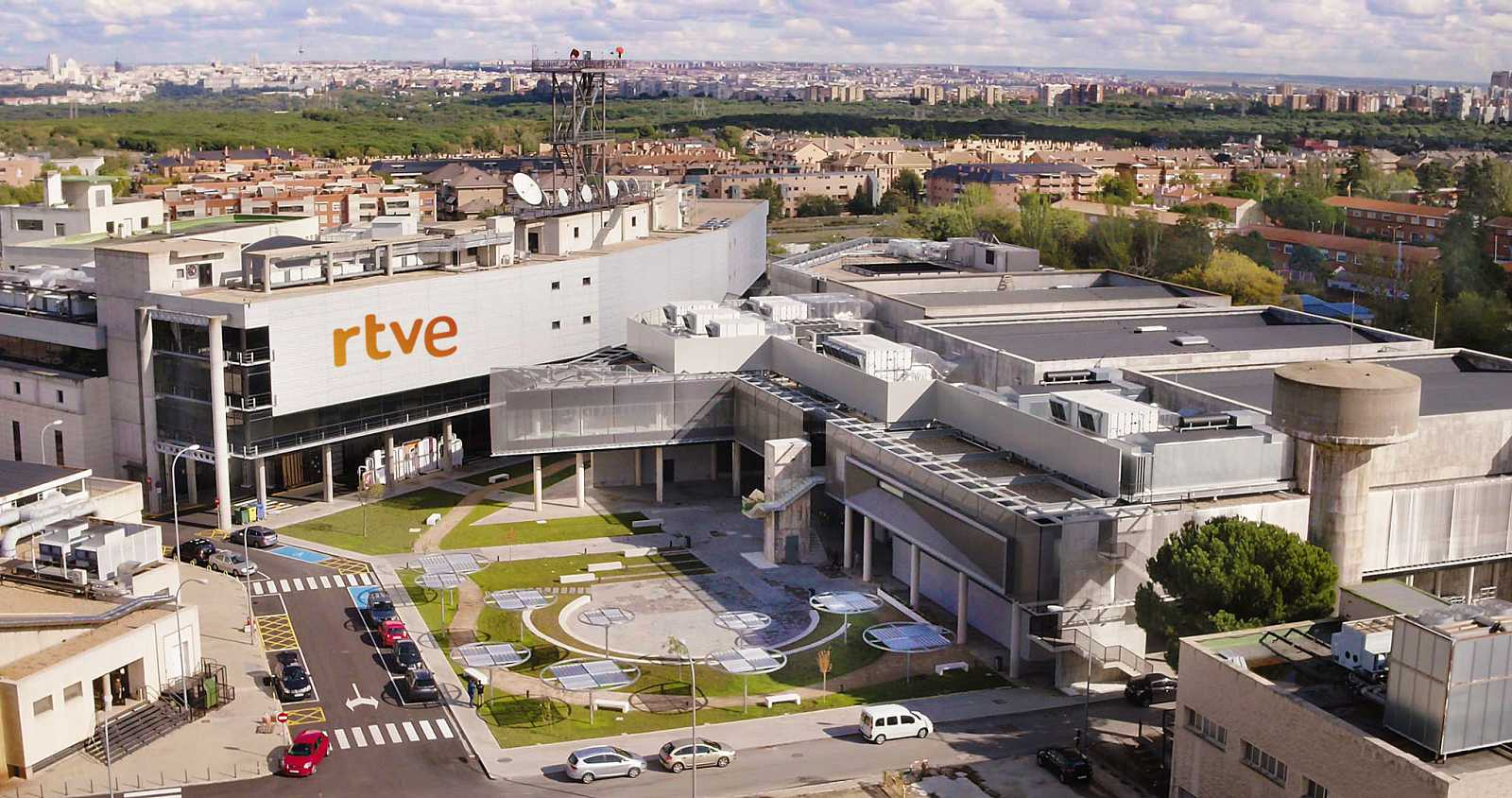
- Television building

General information
- Location: Pozuelo de Alarcón (Madrid), Spain
- Inaugurated: 18 July 1964; 60 years ago
- Owner: Radiotelevisión Española

Other information
- Public transit access: Prado del Rey

Prado del Rey is the central headquarters of Radiotelevisión Española (RTVE), the Spanish state-owned public broadcasting corporation, and the main production center for its subsidiaries Televisión Española (TVE) and Radio Nacional de España (RNE). The complex is in Pozuelo de Alarcón (Madrid).

== History ==
Prado del Rey was inaugurated on 18 July 1964 to replace the first Televisión Española headquarters located at Paseo de la Habana in Madrid. It was opened by Francisco Franco and the then-Minister of Information and Tourism, Manuel Fraga. with three studios already in operation and another six studios under construction. Studio 1 had an area of 1,200 square metres (13,000 sq ft), which made it the largest studio in Europe at the time. Shows and fiction production was soon transferred there, but the news program Telediario and its news services were not transferred until 1967. In 1971, Radio Nacional de España headquarters was moved to an annex building named Casa de la Radio.

On 13 November 1983, it broadcast the last Telediario news bulletin from Prado del Rey, as TVE news services, then located in the basement of the Casa de la Radio, were moved to the new Torrespaña complex in Madrid at the foot of the broadcasting tower. TVE master control room, the central newsroom, 24 Horas news channel, Telediario and Informe Semanal are located there. In 2019, a plan to transfer them back to Prado del Rey starting in late 2021 was approved. This plan was eventually halted due to the COVID-19 pandemic and was replaced by another plan to modernize the facilities in Torrespaña.

== Buildings ==
=== Television building ===
Televisión Española currently has six television studios and everything related to the production of television content (production rooms, dressing rooms).

Studio	Date of opening	Size
Studio 1	1964	1,021 m^{2} (10,990 sq ft)
Studio 2	1964	567 m^{2} (6,100 sq ft)
Studio 3	1964	561 m^{2} (6,040 sq ft)
Studio 4	1996	840 m^{2} (9,000 sq ft)
Studio 5	2019	960 m^{2} (10,300 sq ft)
Studio 6	2019	829 m^{2} (8,920 sq ft)

=== Casa de la Radio ===
It is RNE's central studios. It also keeps the Historical Archives of RNE, separate from the Audiovisual Archives of TVE, which is located in the Archive Building. Its basement was the former home of TVE's news services until its transfer to the Torrespaña complex on 13 November 1983.

=== Corporation Building ===
It holds the administrative offices of the corporation.

=== Archive Building ===
It keeps the Historical Audiovisual Archive of TVE, separate from the Historical Archives of RNE.

=== Production trucks Building ===
It keeps all the technical material used in TVE's broadcasts.

== Gallery ==
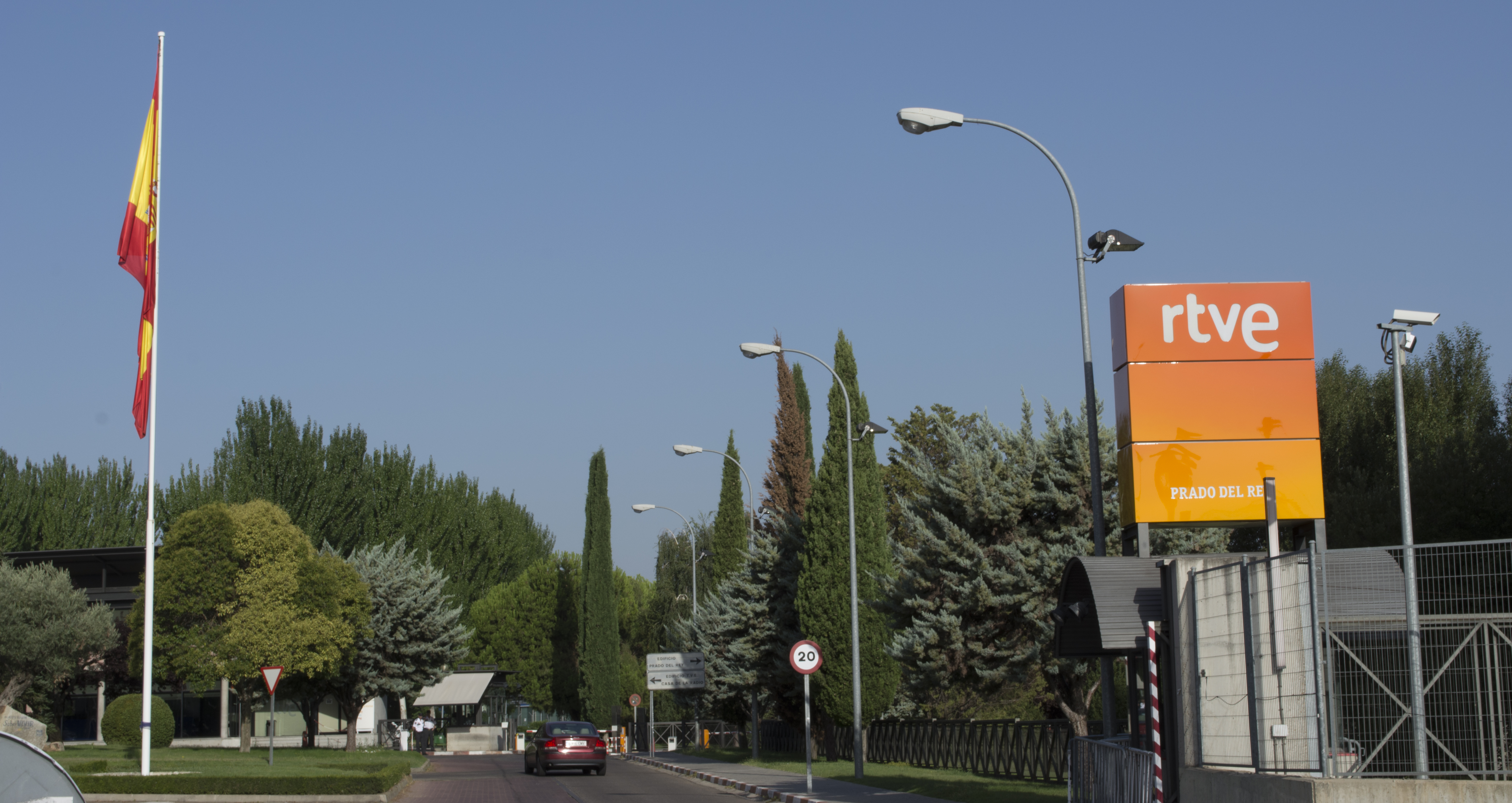
Main entrance

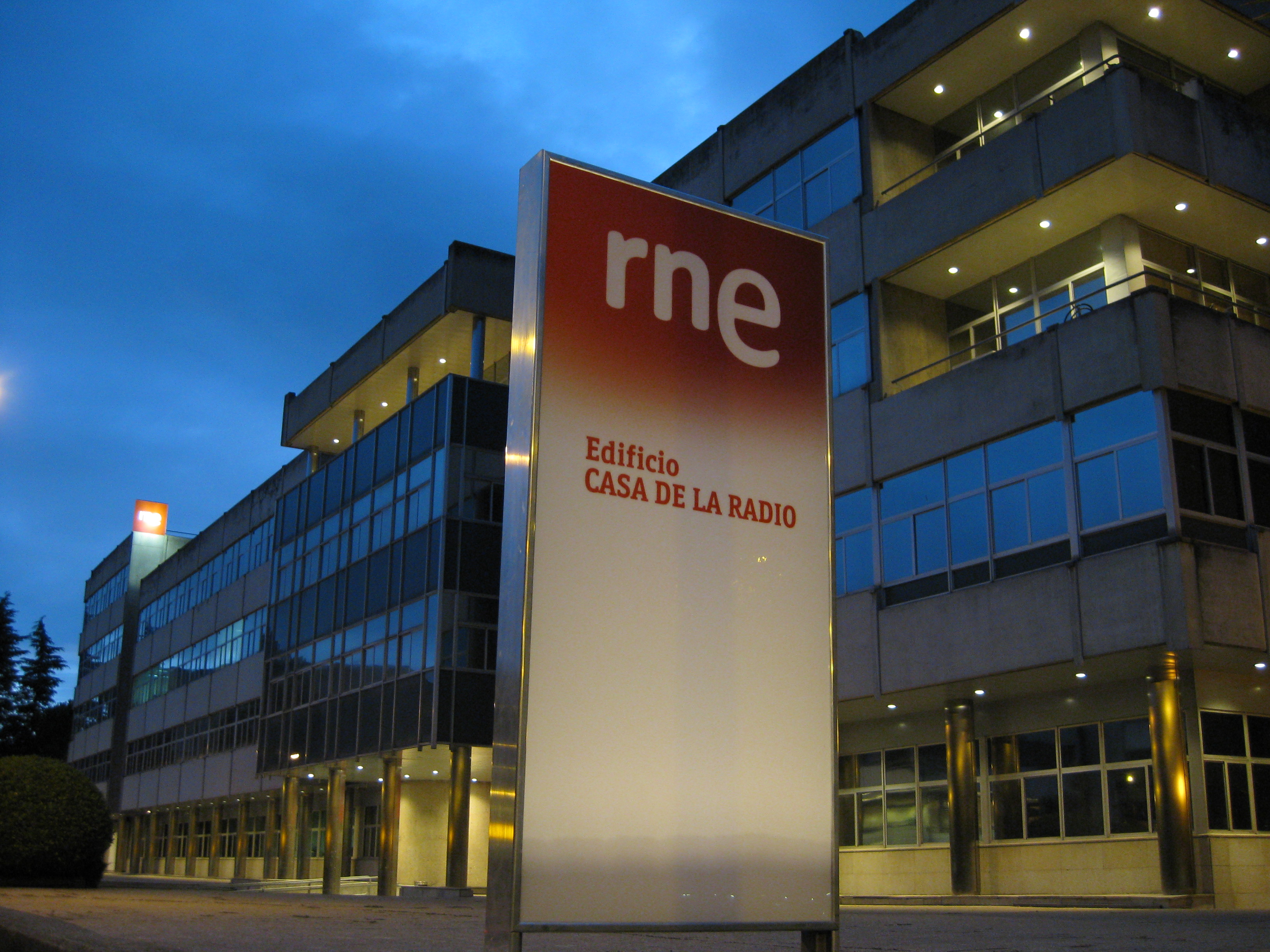
Casa de la Radio

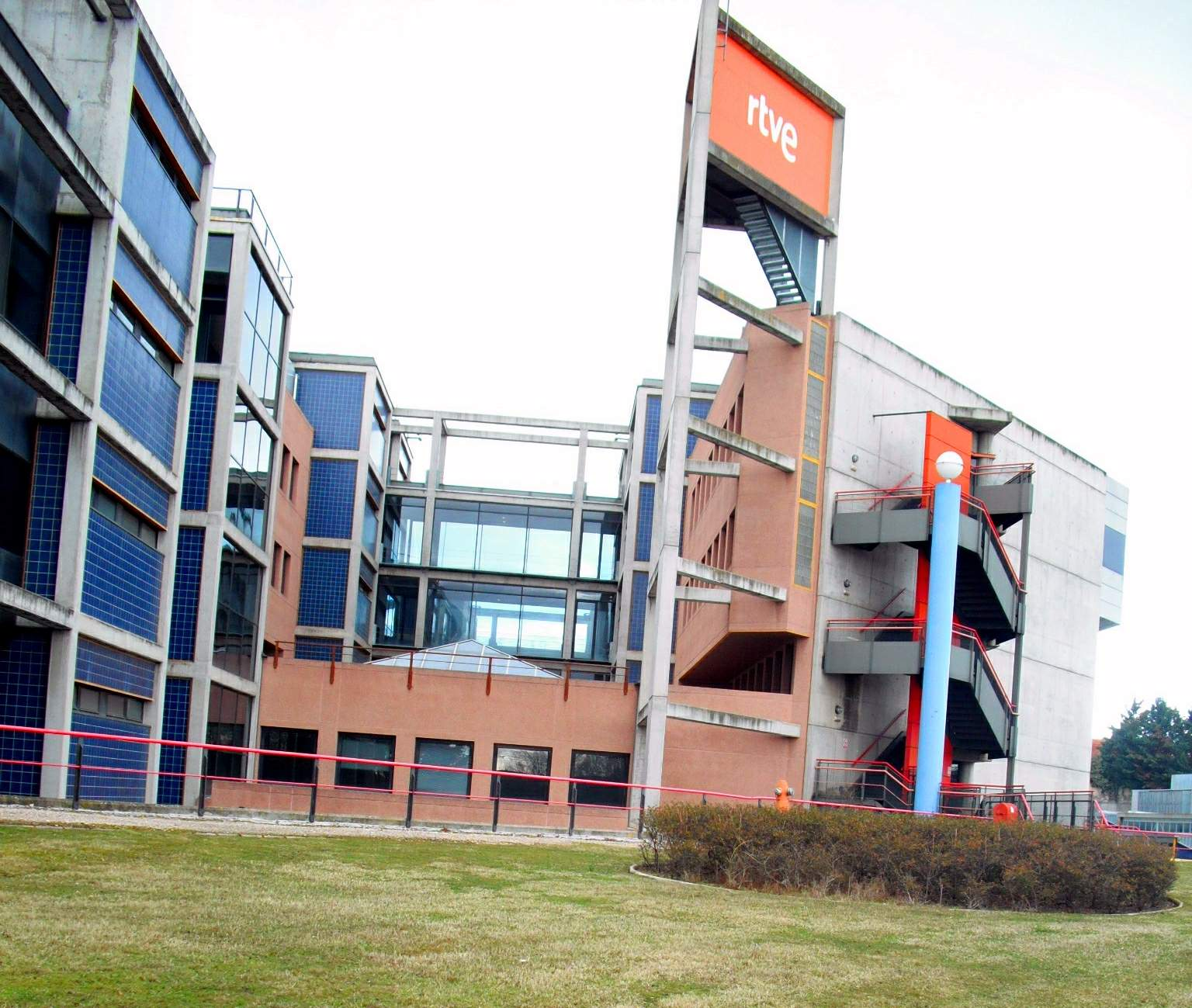
Corporation building
