= Radio Exterior =

International broadcasting service of Spain

Spain
- Broadcast area: Europe, Africa, Americas, Asia and Oceania
- Frequencies: Shortwave, satellite and Internet

Programming
- Languages: Spanish; French; Arabic; Ladino; Portuguese; Russian; English; Chinese
- Network: RNE

Ownership
- Owner: RTVE
- Sister stations: Radio Nacional; Radio Clásica; Radio 3 Ràdio 4 Radio 5

History
- First air date: 15 March 1942; 83 years ago
- Former names: La Voz de España; RNE para América/RNE para Europa (1942–1978)

Links
- Website: Radio Exterior

Radio Exterior de España (REE), or simply Radio Exterior, is a Spanish free-to-air radio station owned and operated by Radio Nacional de España (RNE), the radio division of state-owned public broadcaster Radiotelevisión Española (RTVE). It is the corporation's international radio service and was launched on 15 March 1942. It is considered to be Spain's equivalent to the BBC World Service, Deutsche Welle and Voice of America.

== History ==
While RNE began its first shortwave broadcasts to Europe (La Voz de España) in 1942, its current branding (Radio Exterior de España) was adopted on 2 January 1978.

== Broadcasting ==
The station is primarily intended for Spaniards living abroad. It broadcasts 24 hours a day on satellite and the Internet, but for limited hours on shortwave. Transmissions are in Spanish, French, Arabic, Portuguese & English. Previously broadcasts were also in Ladino, Chinese & Russian, but it was ceased starting from 1 January 2010 due to low listenership.

REE ceased shortwave broadcasts on 15 October 2014; however, two months later it was announced they would resume shortwave broadcasts in Spanish for four hours a day, as well as coverage of sporting events, in order to serve the country's fishing industry whose ships had no other viable means to access REE broadcasts while at sea.

REE transmission originate from the Noblejas transmission site.

== Programming ==
- 24 hours, evening information and entertainment program, with news on politics, culture, economy and sport.
- Radiogaceta de los deportes, sports information program, commentary and commentary on the matches of the Spanish championship of football, basketball and other sports such as Formula 1 and MotoGP.
- Españoles en la mar, program aimed mainly at sailors.
- Amigos de la onda corta, program aimed at radio amateurs and DXers.

== Former logos ==
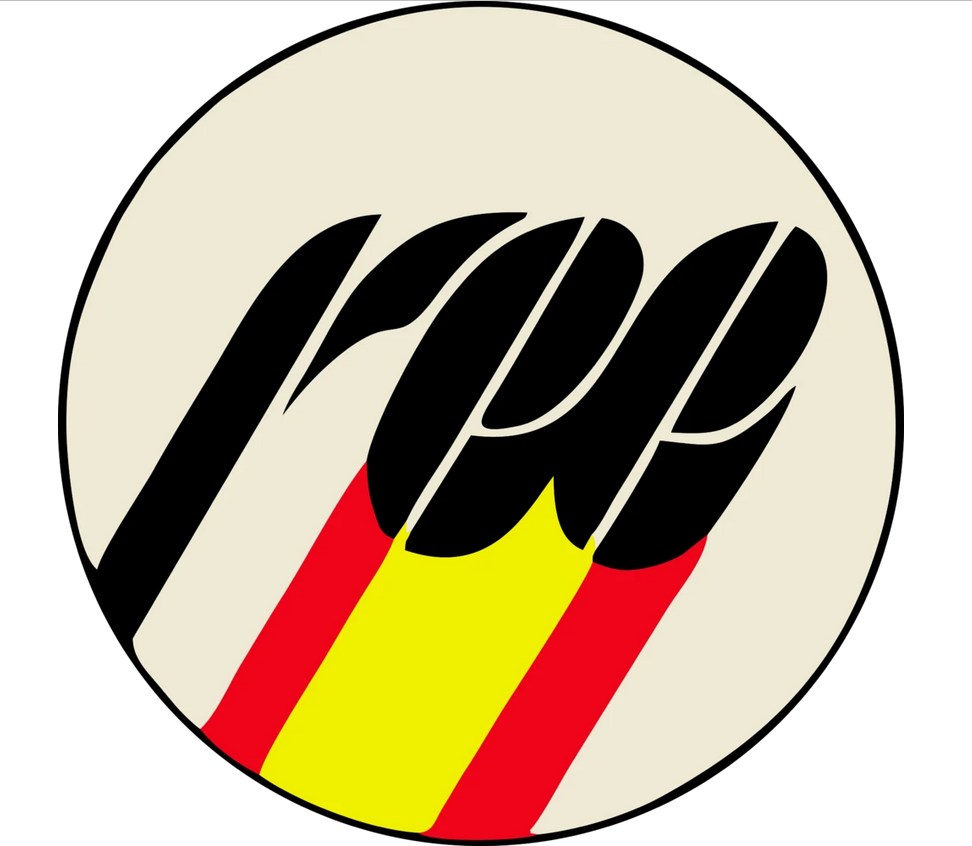
Former logo, used from 1978 until 1988

Previous logo from 2008 until 2016

== See also ==
- List of shortwave radio broadcasters
- List of international radio broadcasters
