= Ràdio 4 =

Spain
- Broadcast area: Catalonia (FM, DAB, DVB-T and Satellite)
- Frequency: 87.9–106.9 MHz

Programming
- Format: News, talk and contemporary music in Catalan
- Network: RNE

Ownership
- Owner: RTVE
- Sister stations: Radio Nacional; Radio Clásica; Radio 3 Radio 5 Radio Exterior

History
- First air date: 13 December 1976; 49 years ago

Links
- Website: Ràdio 4

Ràdio 4 is a Spanish free-to-air radio station owned and operated by Radio Nacional de España (RNE), the radio division of state-owned public broadcaster Radiotelevisión Española (RTVE). It is the corporation's Catalan language radio station, and is available in Catalonia and Andorra. It was launched on 13 December 1976.

== History ==
Ràdio 4 was launched in 1976 during the Spanish transition to democracy, and was integrated into a regional countrywide Radio 4 network in 1988 after the closure of the state-owned but commercially funded Radiocadena Española in that same year. The integrated regional countrywide Radio 4 network was shut down in 1991 due to poor ratings, and RNE Ràdio 4 once again became a standalone radio station.

In 2006 however, RNE Ràdio 4 was itself threatened with the prospect of closure due to a very low audience share (only 8,500 listeners in Catalonia out of a population of 7.5 million people). This sparked a campaign against closure of the station, which eventually proved successful after Santiago Gonzalez, the then newly appointed director of RNE (Radio Nacional de España), decided against closing Ràdio 4.

== Logo history ==
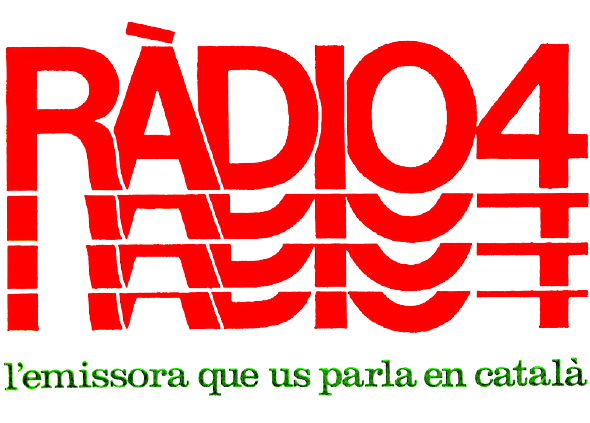
1976–1981

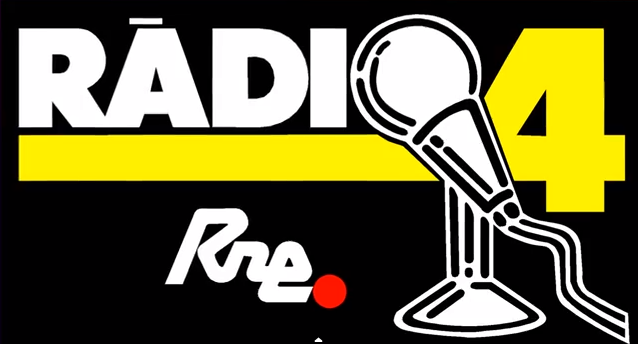
1981–1997

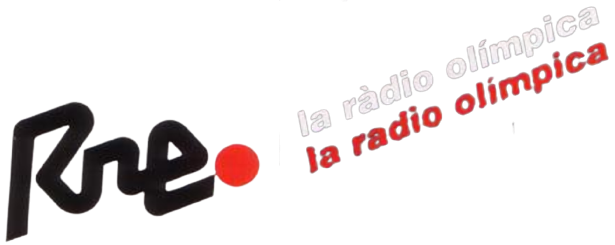
1992

1997–2004

2004–2008

2008–2016
