= FORTA =

Spanish association of public broadcasting networks

- Federación de Organismos de Radio y Televisión Autonómicos
- Formation: 5 April 1989; 37 years ago
- Type: Federation of regional broadcasters
- Legal status: Association
- Headquarters: Calle Bocángel 26
- Location: Madrid, Spain
- Owner: Government of Spain

The Federation of Regional Organizations of Radio and Television (Spanish: Federación de Organismos de Radio y Televisión Autonómicos, FORTA) is an association of public broadcasters of the autonomous communities of Spain. It was created on 5 April 1989.

== Members ==
Autonomous community	Organization	Television channels	Radio stations	Founded
Basque Country	Euskal Irrati Telebista (EITB)	ETB 1 (HD); ETB 2 (HD); ETB 1 On; ETB 2 On; ETB Basque	Euskadi Irratia; Radio Euskadi; Radio Vitoria; EiTB Musika; Gaztea	1982
Catalonia	Corporació Catalana de Mitjans Audiovisuals (CCMA)	TV3 (HD); 33/SX3; 3CatInfo; Esport3; TV3CAT	Catalunya Ràdio; Catalunya Música; 3CatInfo iCat	1983
Galicia	Corporación de Servizos Audiovisuais de Galicia (CSAG)	TVG tvG2; TVG Europa; TVG América	Radio Galega; Radio Galega Música; Son Galicia Radio	1985
Valencian Community	Corporació Audiovisual de la Comunitat Valenciana (CACVSA)	À Punt (HD)	À Punt Ràdio	2016
Andalusia	Radio y Televisión de Andalucía (RTVA)	Canal Sur 1 (HD); Canal Sur 2 Andalucía TV; Canal Sur Andalucía	Canal Sur Radio; Radio Andalucía Información; Canal Fiesta Radio; Flamenco Radio	1987
Madrid	Radio Televisión Madrid (RTVM)	Telemadrid (HD); LaOtra; Telemadrid INT	Onda Madrid	1984
Canary Islands	Radio Televisión Canaria (RTVC)	Televisión Canaria (HD); Televisión Canaria Internacional	Canarias Radio	1984
Castilla–La Mancha	Castilla-La Mancha Media (CMM)	CMM TV (HD)	CMM Radio	2000
Balearic Islands	Ens Públic de Radiotelevisió de les Illes Balears (EPRTVIB)	IB3 (HD); IB3 Global	IB3 Ràdio	2004
Aragon	Corporación Aragonesa de Radio y Televisión (CARTV)	Aragón TV (HD); Aragón Internacional	Aragón Radio; Aragón Radio 2	1987
Asturias	Radiotelevisión del Principado de Asturias / Radiotelevisión del Principáu d'Asturies (RTPA)	TPA7; TPA8; TPA9 HD (defunct)	RPA	2006
Murcia	Radiotelevisión de la Región de Murcia (RTRM)	La 7 RM (HD)	Onda Regional de Murcia; ORM Música	2004

=== Former members ===
Autonomous community	Organization	Television channels	Radio stations	Founded	Defunct
Valencian Community	Radiotelevisió Valenciana (RTVV)	Nou (HD); Nou 24; Canal Nou Dos (defunct); Canal Nou Internacional (defunct)	Nou Radio; Nou Sí Radio	1989	2013

== Non-members ==
- One autonomous community (Extremadura) and two autonomous cities (Ceuta and Melilla) have public broadcasting networks that are not members of the FORTA (CEXMA, RTVCE and RTV Melilla respectively). Extremadura's CEXMA has not joined the FORTA by self-decision.
- Four autonomous communities (Cantabria, Castile and León, La Rioja and Navarre) lack a public broadcasting network. There are region-wide private broadcasting networks in Cantabria (PopularTV Cantabria), Castile and León (RTVCYL), La Rioja (TVR) and Navarre (NATV).

== See also ==
- Television in Spain
