= List of television stations in Spain =

This is a list of television stations in Spain.

== Free-access television ==
=== Nationwide stations ===
Station	Broadcaster	Ownership	Type	Headquarters
La 1	RTVE	Public	DVB-T (HD)	Madrid
La 2	RTVE	Public	DVB-T (HD)	Madrid
24 Horas	RTVE	Public	DVB-T (HD)	Madrid
Clan	RTVE	Public	DVB-T (HD)	Madrid
Teledeporte	RTVE	Public	DVB-T (HD)	Madrid
RNE Accesible	RTVE	Public	DVB-T (HD)	Madrid
Antena 3	Atresmedia	Private	DVB-T (HD)	San Sebastián de los Reyes, Madrid
laSexta	Atresmedia	Private	DVB-T (HD)	San Sebastián de los Reyes, Madrid
Neox	Atresmedia	Private	DVB-T (HD)	San Sebastián de los Reyes, Madrid
Nova	Atresmedia	Private	DVB-T (HD)	San Sebastián de los Reyes, Madrid
Mega	Atresmedia	Private	DVB-T (HD)	San Sebastián de los Reyes, Madrid
Atreseries	Atresmedia	Private	DVB-T (HD)	San Sebastián de los Reyes, Madrid
Telecinco	Mediaset España	Private	DVB-T (HD)	Fuencarral-El Pardo, Madrid
Cuatro	Mediaset España	Private	DVB-T (HD)	Fuencarral-El Pardo, Madrid
FDF	Mediaset España	Private	DVB-T (HD)	Fuencarral-El Pardo, Madrid
Divinity	Mediaset España	Private	DVB-T (HD)	Fuencarral-El Pardo, Madrid
Energy	Mediaset España	Private	DVB-T (HD)	Fuencarral-El Pardo, Madrid
Be Mad	Mediaset España	Private	DVB-T (HD)	Fuencarral-El Pardo, Madrid
Boing	Mediaset España and Skydance Europe and Africa	Private	DVB-T (HD)	Fuencarral-El Pardo, Madrid
Squirrel	Sociedad Gestora de Televisión Net TV (Squirrel Media)	Private	DVB-T (HD)	Madrid
Squirrel2	Sociedad Gestora de Televisión Net TV (Squirrel Media)	Private	DVB-T (HD)	Madrid
Veo7	Veo Televisión (Unidad Editorial)	Private	DVB-T (HD)	Torrejón de Ardoz, Madrid
DMAX	Veo Televisión (Skydance Europe and Africa)	Private	DVB-T (HD)	Madrid
DKISS	Kiss Media and Skydance Europe and Africa	Private	DVB-T (HD)	Pozuelo de Alarcón, Madrid
Ten	Ten Media and Grupo Secuoya	Private	DVB-T (HD)	Granada
Trece	Ábside Media	Private	DVB-T (HD)	Madrid
Real Madrid TV	Real Madrid Club de Fútbol	Private	DVB-T (HD)	Madrid
La Séptima	Servicios Integrados Entretenimiento Televisivo	Private	DVB-T (HD)	San Sebastián de los Reyes, Madrid

=== Autonomous communities-wide stations ===
==== Andalusia ====
Station	Broadcaster	Ownership	Type
Canal Sur	Radio y Televisión de Andalucía	Public	DVB-T (HD)
Canal Sur 2	Radio y Televisión de Andalucía	Public	DVB-T (HD)
Andalucía TV	Radio y Televisión de Andalucía	Public	DVB-T (HD)
BOM Cine	Avista Televisión de Andalucía	Private	DVB-T (HD)

==== Aragon ====
Station	Broadcaster	Ownership	Type
Aragón TV	Corporación Aragonesa de Radio y Televisión	Public	DVB-T (HD)

==== Asturias ====
Station	Broadcaster	Ownership	Type
TPA7	Radio Televisión del Principado de Asturias	Public	DVB-T (HD)
TPA8	Radio Televisión del Principado de Asturias	Public	DVB-T (HD)

==== Balearic Islands ====
Station	Broadcaster	Ownership	Type
IB3	Ens Públic de Radiotelevisió de les Illes Balears	Public	DVB-T (HD)
TV3CAT	Corporació Catalana de Mitjans Audiovisuals	Public	DVB-T (HD)
SX3/33	Corporació Catalana de Mitjans Audiovisuals	Public	DVB-T (HD)
3CatInfo	Corporació Catalana de Mitjans Audiovisuals	Public	DVB-T (HD)
Fibwi4	Fibwi	Private	DVB-T (HD)

==== Basque Country ====
Station	Broadcaster	Ownership	Type
ETB 1	Euskal Irrati Telebista	Public	DVB-T (HD)
ETB 2	Euskal Irrati Telebista	Public	DVB-T (HD)
ETB 1 On	Euskal Irrati Telebista	Public	DVB-T (HD)
ETB 2 On	Euskal Irrati Telebista	Public	DVB-T (HD)

==== Canary Islands ====
Station	Broadcaster	Ownership	Type
Televisión Canaria	Radio Televisión Canaria	Public	DVB-T (HD)

==== Cantabria ====
Station	Broadcaster	Ownership	Type
Popular TV Cantabria	Televisión Popular de Santander	Private	DVB-T

==== Castile and León ====
Station	Broadcaster	Ownership	Type
La 7 CYL	Radio y Televisión Castilla y León	Private	DVB-T (HD)
La 8 CYL	Radio y Televisión Castilla y León	Private	DVB-T (HD)

==== Castilla–La Mancha ====
Station	Broadcaster	Ownership	Type
CMM TV	Castilla–La Mancha Media	Public	DVB-T (HD)

==== Catalonia ====
Station	Broadcaster	Ownership	Type
TV3	Corporació Catalana de Mitjans Audiovisuals	Public	DVB-T (HD)
SX3/33	Corporació Catalana de Mitjans Audiovisuals	Public	DVB-T (HD)
Esport3	Corporació Catalana de Mitjans Audiovisuals	Public	DVB-T (HD)
3CatInfo	Corporació Catalana de Mitjans Audiovisuals	Public	DVB-T (HD)
La 2 Cat	RTVE	Public	DVB-T (HD)
IB3 Global	Ens Públic de Radiotelevisió de les Illes Balears	Public	DVB-T (HD)

==== Ceuta ====
Station	Broadcaster	Ownership	Type
Radio Televisión Ceuta	Compañía de Radio Televisión Ceuta	Public	DVB-T (HD)
Canal Sur	Radio y Televisión de Andalucía	Public	DVB-T (HD)

==== Community of Madrid ====
Station	Broadcaster	Ownership	Type
Telemadrid	Radio Televisión Madrid	Public	DVB-T (HD)
LaOtra	Radio Televisión Madrid	Public	DVB-T (HD)
Telemadrid HDR	Radio Televisión Madrid	Public	DVB-T (HD)
BOM Cine	Sociedad Gestora de Televisión Onda 6-Grupo Squirrel	Private	DVB-T (HD)

==== Extremadura ====
Station	Broadcaster	Ownership	Type
Canal Extremadura	Corporación Extremeña de Medios Audiovisuales	Public	DVB-T (HD)

==== Galicia ====
Station	Broadcaster	Ownership	Type
TVG	Compañía de Radio Televisión de Galicia	Public	DVB-T (HD)
TVG2	Compañía de Radio Televisión de Galicia	Public	DVB-T (HD)
BOM Cine	Grupo Squirrel	Private	DVB-T (HD)

==== La Rioja ====
Station	Broadcaster	Ownership	Type
Televisión Rioja	Rioja Televisión	Private	DVB-T (HD)
La 7 La Rioja	Sumando TV	Private	DVB-T (HD)

==== Melilla ====
Station	Broadcaster	Ownership	Type
Televisión Melilla	Radio Televisión Melilla	Public	DVB-T (HD)
Popular TV Melilla	Popular Television	Private	DVB-T (HD)
Canal Sur	Radio y Televisión de Andalucía	Public	DVB-T (HD)

==== Navarre ====
Station	Broadcaster	Ownership	Type
Navarra Televisión	Editora Independiente de Medios de Navarra SA	Private	DVB-T (HD)
Navarra Televisión 2	Editora Independiente de Medios de Navarra SA	Private	DVB-T (HD)
ETB 1	EITB	Public	DVB-T (HD)
ETB 2	EITB	Public	DVB-T (HD)
ETB 1 On	EITB	Public	DVB-T (HD)
ETB 2 On	EITB	Public	DVB-T (HD)

==== Region of Murcia ====
Station	Broadcaster	Ownership	Type
La 7	Radiotelevisión de la Región de Murcia	Public	DVB-T (HD)
TV Murciana	Televisión Murciana S.A.	Private	DVB-T (HD)
Popular TV	Televisión Popular de la Región de Murcia	Private	DVB-T (HD)
BOM Cine	La Verdad Radio y TV S.A.-Grupo Squirrel	Private	DVB-T (HD)

==== Valencian Community ====
Station	Broadcaster	Ownership	Type
À Punt	Corporación Valenciana de Medios de Comunicación	Public	DVB-T (HD)
La 8 Mediterráneo	TV Popular del Mediterráneo	Private	DVB-T (HD)
BOM Cine	Squirrel Inversiones SL-Grupo Squirrel	Private	DVB-T (HD)

=== Insular stations ===
The insular stations are TV channels that are island-wide, which means they are visible in a specific island. These stations are exclusive to the Canary and Balearic Islands. This is a list of them (* means they haven't started their transmissions yet):

Station	Island/Region	Autonomous community
13 TV*	Menorca, Ibiza and Formentera	Balearic Islands
Canal 4	Mallorca	Balearic Islands
Canal 11	La Palma	Canary Islands
Canal Ocho*	El Hierro and La Gomera	Canary Islands
Ed. Balear	Menorca	Balearic Islands
Eivissa TV	Ibiza and Formentera	Balearic Islands
El Día TV	Santa Cruz de Tenerife, Arona and La Orotava	Canary Islands
La Opinión de Tenerife*	El Hierro and La Gomera	Canary Islands
La Provincia*	Lanzarote and La Palma	Canary Islands
Localia*	Fuerteventura, Las Palmas, Mogán and Telde	Canary Islands
LuxTV	Mallorca	Balearic Islands
Mírame TV	Santa Cruz de Tenerife	Canary Islands
Nueve TV	Fuerteventura, Las Palmas, Lanzarote, Mogán and Telde	Canary Islands
RTV La Gomera 1	La Gomera	Canary Islands
RTV La Gomera 2	La Gomera	Canary Islands
Teidevisión Canal 6*	Santa Cruz de Tenerife and La Orotava	Canary Islands
TV Portmany*	Ibiza and Formentera	Balearic Islands

=== Local stations ===
These TV stations are called local stations. They can only be seen in certain municipalities or comarcas, and their power is devolved to the autonomous communities. This is a list of them (* means they haven't started their transmissions yet):

==== Andalusia ====
===== Province of Almería =====
Zone	Stations
Albox	Indalo TV
Almería	Interalmería TV; 8TV
El Ejido	8 TV
Huércal-Overa	Levante TV 9 Indalo TV
Níjar	Indalo TV

===== Province of Cádiz =====
Zone	Stations
Algeciras	Onda Algeciras; 8 Campo de Gibraltar; 8 La Línea; Canal San Roque TV
Arcos de la Frontera	Canal Sierra de Cádiz; 8 TV; Siete Andalucía
Cádiz	Onda Cádiz; RTV Tarifa; 8 TV Cádiz; Siete Andalucía
Chiclana de la Frontera	RTV Tarifa; 8 TV Cádiz; 8 TV Chiclana; 8 TV El Puerto
Jerez de la Frontera	Onda Jerez TV; Costa Noroeste TV; Siete Andalucía; 8 TV
Medina-Sidonia	8 TV
Ubrique	Canal Sierra de Cádiz; 8 TV; Siete Andalucía

===== Province of Córdoba =====
Zone	Stations
Baena	Cancionero TV
Córdoba	TVM; Mezquita TV; 8 TV
Lucena	8 TV Estepa; Canal Subbetica
Montilla	Siete Andalucía
Palma del Río	TeleQuivir; Guadalquivir TV

===== Province of Granada =====
Zone	Stations
Almuñécar	Asociación Cultural Radio Televisión Adventista de Málaga*; Kiss TV*
Baza	Asociación Cultural Radio Televisión Adventista de Málaga*
Granada	TG7; 8 TV Granada; Publicaciones del Sur; PTV Granada
Guadix	Asociación Cultural Radio Televisión Adventista de Málaga*
Huéscar	Asociación Cultural Radio Televisión Adventista de Málaga*
Iznalloz	Publicaciones del Sur*
Motril	TeleMotril; GCFTV

===== Province of Huelva =====
Zone	Stations
Almonte	Doñana Comunicación; TeleOnuba; CNH
Aracena	Más TV Huelva
Huelva	Huelva TV; Canal Luz; El Sembrador; CNH Canal Huelva
Lepe	Canal Costa; TeleOnuba

===== Province of Jaén =====
Zone	Stations
Andújar	Canal 45 TV; Alternativa TV; Portal Azul TV; Nueva TV
Cazorla	Diez TV Cazorla HD; 9 La Loma HD
Jaén	Onda Jaén (No broadcast); 7TV Jaén HD; PTV Jaén
Linares	7TV Linares HD; TV-201
Úbeda	Diez TV Úbeda HD; 9 La Loma HD
Villacarrillo	Diez TV Las Villas HD

===== Province of Málaga =====
Zone	Stations
Álora	101 TV; Siete TV; Málaga 24h
Antequera	101 TV; Antaquira Televisión Digital
Estepona	101 TV; Estepona TV; Mediterráneo TV; Siete Andalucía
Fuengirola	Fuengirola TV; 73TV; Costa del Sol TV; Siete Andalucía
Málaga	Canal Málaga TV; 101 TV; 8 TV Málaga; Ver-T; Torrevisión; Chat; Siete Andalucía; PTV
Marbella	101 TV; RTV Marbella; 7 TV Marbella; M95
Nerja	Axarquía TV; 101 TV
Ronda	Siete Andalucía
Vélez-Málaga	Axarquía TV; Axartel TV; 101 TV

===== Province of Seville =====
Zone	Stations
Dos Hermanas	TV Carmona
Écija	Écija Comarca TV; Telécija; 8 TV Écija
Estepa	8 TV Estepa; Andalucía Digital TV; Giganet TV
Morón de la Frontera	8 TV Morón
Sevilla	7 TV Andalucía; PTV Sevilla; Betis TV; SFC; Vivamovil
Utrera	Uvitel

==== Province of Huesca ====
Zone	Stations
Barbastro	Canal 25; Huesca TV
Fraga	Fraga TV
Huesca	La Tele TV; ANTV Huesca; Huesca TV
Jaca	Huesca TV
Monzón	Tele Monzón

===== Province of Teruel =====
Zone	Stations
Alcañiz	La Tele TV
Calamocha	Calamocha TV

===== Province of Zaragoza =====
Zone	Stations
Alagón	52 TV; Antena Aragón
Ejea de los Caballeros	Ejea TV
Tarazona	La General TV
Zaragoza	La 8; 7NN

==== Asturias ====
Zone	Stations
Avilés	Vinx
Cangas del Narcea	Tele Narcea
Gijón	Canal 10 (No broadcast); Vinx
Oviedo	Vinx

==== Balearic Islands ====
Zone	Stations
Ibiza-Formentera	Ibiza Global TV; TEF
Inca	Fibwi TV
Manacor	Fibwi TV
Menorca	Fibwi4; Televisió Menorquina; Fibwi TV
Palma de Mallorca	Fibwi TV; Fight Time TV
Pollença	Fibwi TV
Sóller	Fibwi TV

==== Basque Country ====
===== Province of Álava =====
Zone	Stations
Llodio	TeleVitoria; Álava 7 TV
Vitoria	Álava 7 TV; VTV; Hamaika; Global 7

===== Province of Biscay =====
Zone	Stations
Barakaldo	TeleBilbao; Hamaika; Tele 7 Bizkaia TV
Bermeo	Bizkaia TV; Oizmendi Telebista; TeleBilbao
Bilbao	TeleBilbao; Bizkaia TV; Tele 7 Hamaika
Durango	Bizkaia TV; Hamaika; TeleBilbao
Getxo	Tele 7 Hamaika; Bizkaia TV

===== Province of Guipuzcoa =====
Zone	Stations
Beasain	Teledonosti; Goierri Telebista; Urola Telebista
Eibar	Teledonosti; Hamaika; TeleDonostia
Irun	Teledonosti; Hamaika; TeleDonostia; Global 7
Mondragón	Goitb; Teledonosti
San Sebastián	Teledonosti; Hamaika; Global 7
Tolosa	Teledonosti; 28 Kanala
Zarautz	Teledonosti; Erlo Telebista uk4

==== Canary Islands ====
===== Province of Las Palmas =====
Zone	Stations
Fuerteventura	Mírame TV
Lanzarote	Lancelot TV; Mírame TV
Las Palmas de Gran Canaria	Gran Canaria TV; TIC Canal 8 Canal 4
Mogán	TV Mogán; Canal 4 Telde; Mírame TV; Gran Canaria TV
Telde	Este Canal; Canal 4 TIC Canal 8 Gran Canaria TV

===== Province of Santa Cruz de Tenerife =====
Zone	Stations
Arona	Mírame TV
La Gomera	Mírame TV
El Hierro	Mírame TV
La Orotava	Canal 4 Mírame TV
La Palma	Mírame TV; Canal 11
Santa Cruz de Tenerife	Canal 4 Mírame TV

==== Cantabria ====
Zone	Stations
Castro Urdiales	11 TV Cantabria; Cantabria 7 Televisión
Potes	Cantabria 7 Televisión
Reinosa	Cantabria 7 Televisión
Santander	Cantabria 7 Televisión
Selaya	Cantabria 7 Televisión
Torrelavega	Cantabria 7 Televisión

==== Castile and León ====
===== Province of Ávila =====
Zone	Stations
Ávila	Hit TV*; Telemadrid INT

===== Province of Burgos =====
Zone	Stations
Aranda de Duero	Telearanda*
Burgos	Hit TV*; LaDeBurgos TV*
Miranda de Ebro	Televisión Miranda*; ETB 1 ETB 2

===== Province of León =====
Zone	Stations
Astorga	987live* TPA10
León	987live Hit TV*; TPA10
Ponferrada	987live* TVG Europa

===== Province of Palencia =====
Zone	Stations
Palencia	Hit TV*

===== Province of Salamanca =====
Zone	Stations
Salamanca	Hit TV; Canal Extremadura

===== Province of Segovia =====
Zone	Stations
Segovia	Hit TV*; Telemadrid INT

===== Province of Soria =====
Zone	Stations
Soria	Canal 9 Soria; Hit TV; Aragón TV; CMM TV

===== Province of Valladolid =====
Zone	Stations
Medina del Campo	Telemedina Canal 9 Eukast*
Valladolid	Telemedina Canal 9; 987live* Hit TV*

===== Province of Zamora =====
Zone	Stations
Benavente	TV Benavente*
Zamora	Hit TV*

==== Castilla–La Mancha ====
===== Province of Albacete =====
Zone	Stations
Albacete	Visión 6
Alcaraz	Visión 6
Almansa	Canal Imagen Caudete; Visión 6
Elche de la Sierra	Visión 6
Hellín	Visión 6 TV Hellín
La Roda	Visión 6
Villarrobledo	TV La Mancha; Visión 6 Canal 4 Mancha Centro

===== Province of Ciudad Real =====
Zone	Stations
Alcázar de San Juan	Mancha Centro TV
Almadén	Imás TV
Ciudad Real	Imás TV; TV La Mancha; CRTV
Manzanares	Membrilla TV; Manzanares 10 TV; TV La Mancha; Imás TV
Puertollano	Imás TV
Tomelloso	Imás TV; TV La Mancha
Valdepeñas	Imás TV; Popular TV Valdepeñas

===== Province of Cuenca =====
Zone	Stations
Las Pedroñeras	TV La Mancha; TV Pedroñeras
Tarancón	Teletoledo

===== Province of Guadalajara =====
Zone	Stations
Azuqueca de Henares	Guada TV; Alcarria TV (El Toro TV)
Guadalajara	Guada TV; Alcarria TV (El Toro TV)

===== Province of Toledo =====
Zone	Stations
Illescas	Teletoledo; Canal diocesano
Madridejos	Teletoledo; Canal diocesano
Quintanar de la Orden	Teletoledo; Canal diocesano
Talavera de la Reina	Teletoledo; Canal Comercial
Toledo	Teletoledo; Canal diocesano
Torrijos	Teletoledo; Canal diocesano

==== Catalonia ====
===== Province of Barcelona =====
Zone	Stations
Barcelona	Betevé; BDN-Badalona; TV Hospitalet; Canal 4 Catalunya
Cornellá de Llobregat	ETV; Tele Taxi TV; Gavà Televisió; TV10
Granollers	VOTV; Vallès Visió; Canal 4 Catalunya
Igualada	25TV; Canal Taronja
Manresa	TV Berguedà; Canal Taronja
Mataró	Mataró TV; Mar TV
Sabadell-Terrassa	Hit TV; Canal Terrassa; Canal 4 Catalunya; Molahits TV; TVSC Vallès; TV Sabadell-Vallès
Vic	Teve.cat; Canal Taronja; El 9 TV
Vilanova i la Geltrú	Penedès TV; Canal Blau; Terramar TV; TV El Vendrell

===== Province of Girona =====
Zone	Stations
Blanes	Teve.cat
Figueres	Canal 10 Empordà; Empordà TV
Girona	Banyoles Televisió; Teve.cat; TV Girona
Olot	TV Ripollès; Olot Televisió
Palafrugell	TV Costa Brava

===== Province of Lleida =====
Zone	Stations
Balaguer	Lleida TV; TOT TV
Lleida	Lleida TV; TOT TV; Teve.cat
La Seu d'Urgell	Tot TV; Pirineus TV
Vielha e Mijaran	Lleida TV

===== Province of Tarragona =====
Zone	Stations
Reus	Canal Reus
Tarragona	TAC 12; Teve.cat; Terramar Tarragona
Tortosa	Canal TE; TE24; Canal 21 Ebre

==== Ceuta ====
Zone	Stations
Ceuta	Radio TV de Ceuta; Canal Sur

==== Community of Madrid ====
Zone	Stations
Alcalá de Henares	8madrid Enlace TBN
Alcobendas	8madrid 13TV Madrid; Enlace TBN
Aranjuez	8madrid Hit TV
Collado Villalba	8madrid 13TV Madrid; Hit TV
Fuenlabrada	8madrid TBN-Enlace; Libertad Digital TV
Madrid	8madrid 13TV Madrid; Intereconomía TV; Hit TV; Canal Red; CGTN-Español; Canal Galería; La Tienda en Casa; Enlace TBN; Libertad Digital TV; Botopro; Buena Compra TV; Déjate de Historias TV
Móstoles	8madrid 13TV Madrid; Enlace TBN
Pozuelo de Alarcón	8madrid 13TV Madrid; Hit TV
San Martín de Valdeiglesias	8madrid
Soto del Real	8madrid

==== Extremadura ====
===== Province of Badajoz =====
Zone	Stations
Almendralejo	Consorcio Almendralejo Televisión TV
Don Benito	9TV Nuestra Comarca
Mérida	Televisión Extremeña; K30 TV; Vía Extremadura TV
Zafra	RTV Zafra; TeleZafra

===== Province of Cáceres =====
Zone	Stations
Miajadas	TV Miajadas; Comarcalia TV
Navalmoral de la Mata	TelePlasencia
Plasencia	Vía Plata TV

==== Galicia ====
===== Province of A Coruña =====
Zone	Stations
As Pontes de García Rodríguez	RTV Eume; Canal Vía TV
Ferrol	Ferrol TV
Vimianzo	Canal Vía TV

===== Province of Lugo =====
Zone	Stations
Chantada	TeleVinte; Canal Vía TV
Lugo	Telelugo

===== Province of Ourense =====
Zone	Stations
Ourense	Telemiño; Auria TV

===== Province of Pontevedra =====
Zone	Stations
Lalín	Nós TV
Ponteareas	Canal Vía TV; Nós TV
Pontevedra	Vía Pontevedra; Canal Rías Baixas; Canal Vía TV
Vigo	Televigo; Hermes/Inter
Vilagarcía de Arousa	Canal Rías Baixas

==== Melilla ====
Zone	Stations
Melilla	TV Melilla; Popular TV; Canal Sur; Canal Sur 2

==== Navarre ====
Zone	Stations
Estella-Lizarra	ETB 3
Pamplona/Iruña	Hamaika Telebista; Iruindarra TB; Xaloa Telebista; ETB 3
Sangüesa	ETB 3
Tafalla	Zona Media TV; 30TV; ETB 3
Tudela	ETB 3

==== Region of Murcia ====
Zone	Stations
Lorca	Comarcal TV; Enlace TBN; GTM
Molina de Segura	Thader TV
Murcia	La Opinión TV; Enlace TBN; GTM Televisión
Torre-Pacheco	Canal 1 TV Mar Menor; La Opinión TV; GTM Televisión

==== Valencian Community ====
===== Province of Alicante =====
Zone	Stations
Alcoy	Información TV; TV Intercomarcal tvA
Alicante/Alacant	Alicantí TV; 12 TV; TV Intercomarcal; Información TV
Benidorm	Información TV; Punt B 8 La Marina
Dénia	TV Comarcal; 8 La Marina; Tele 7 Calderona
Elche/Elx	Información TV; Elche 7 TV
Elda	UNE Vinalopó; TV Intercomarcal
Orihuela-Torrevieja	TV Vega Baja; Comarca TV

===== Province of Castellón =====
Zone	Stations
Castellón/Castelló	TV de Castelló; Medi TV; Teve 4 Vila-Real
Morella	TV de Castelló; Medi TV; Nord
Vall de Uxó-Segorbe	Teve 4 La Vall
Vinaroz	TV de Castelló; TVU Vinaróz; Canal 56

===== Province of Valencia =====
Zone	Stations
Alzira	Ribera Televisió; Sucro TV
Gandía	TV Comarcal Safor; Gandía TV; TeleSafor
Ontinyent-Xàtiva	TV Comarcal; MK TV
Sagunt	Teve 4
Torrent	Canal 7 Televalencia; Horta Televisió
València	Valècia Televisió; Levante TV
