= List of Catalan-language television channels =

Catalan-language television channels include the following:

== Regional channels ==
Name	Owner	Programming	Coverage	Launched	Web
TV3	TVC	General	Catalonia	1983	http://3cat.cat/tv3
33	TVC	Culture	Catalonia	1988	http://tv3.cat/programacio/canal-33
SX3	TVC	Children's and educative	Catalonia	2001	http://3cat.cat/tv3/sx3
Esport3	TVC	Sports	Catalonia	2010	http://3cat.cat/esport3
3CatInfo	TVC	News and politics	Catalonia	2003	http://3catinfo.cat
TV3CAT	TVC	General	Catalonia	1995	http://tv3.cat/programacio/canal-tv3cat
À Punt	CVMC	General	Valencian Community	2018	http://apuntmedia.es/
IB3	EPRTVIB	General	Balearic Islands	2005	https://ib3.org/televisio
IB3 Global	EPRTVIB	General	Balearic Islands	2016	
Fibwi4		General	Balearic Islands	1986	http://fibwi.live/ca/tv

== Local channels ==
=== Andorra ===
Name	Programming	Signal	Coverage	Web
Andorra Televisió	Local	Digital and analog	Andorra	http://rtva.ad

=== Baix Camp and Priorat ===
Name	Programming	Signal	Coverage	Web

=== Bages, Berguedà and Solsonès ===
Name	Programming	Signal	Coverage	Web
Televisió de Manresa	Local	Analog	Bages	https://web.archive.org/web/20070206140311/http://www.xtvl.cat/tvmanresa/
TLB	Local	Analog	Bages	https://web.archive.org/web/20070302162517/http://www.latele.cc/

=== Horta, Safor and Vall d'Albaida ===
Name	Programming	Signal	Coverage	Web
Info TV	Local	Analog	Safor and Vall d'Albaida	http://www.infotelevisio.com/

== Other channels ==
Name	Programming	Coverage	Signal	Web
Canal 24 Horas	News	Catalonia	DVB-T	http://www.rtve.es/
Cartoon Network	Children	Catalan Countries and Europe	DVB-C/S	http://www.cartoonnetwork.es/
Cartoon Network +1	Children	Catalan Countries and Spain	DVB-C	http://www.cartoonnetwork.es/
France 3	General	Catalan Countries and Europe	DVB-T/S	https://web.archive.org/web/20170509055524/http://www.france3.fr/
La 1	General	Catalonia	DVB-T	http://www.rtve.es/
La 2 Cat	Culture	Catalonia	DVB-T	http://www.rtve.es/
Tequilla	Sports	Catalan Countries and Europe	DVB-S	http://www.plus.es/taquilla/

== Closed channels ==
Name	Programming	Coverage	Signal	Live	Web
300	Entertainment	DVB-T WTV	Catalonia		https://web.archive.org/web/20120620103417/http://www.300.cat/
Canal Nord TV	Local	DVB-T	Empordà		https://web.archive.org/web/20060720115144/http://www.canalnord.tv/
Canal Nou	General	PAL	Valencian Community	https://web.archive.org/web/20060721012000/http://www.canal9.es/	
Canal Nou Dos	Culture	DVB-T	Valencian Community		http://www.punt2.es/
Canal Nou 24	News	DVB-T	Valencian Community		
Canal Nou Internacional	General	DVB-S/C WTV	Valencian Community		http://www.tvvi.es/
Canal Olímpic	Sports	PAL	Catalonia		
Fibracat TV	General	DVB-T	Catalonia		https://www.fibracattv.cat/
Flaix TV	Music	PAL	Catalonia		
Gandia TV	Local	DVB-T: 26 UHF	Safor	Sí	http://www.gandiatv.com/
K3	Children	DVB-T WTV	Catalonia		
Més TV	Local	DVB-T: 56 UHF	Baix Camp and Priorat		https://web.archive.org/web/20091208012738/http://www.mestv.cat/
RAC 105 TV	Music	DVB-T	Catalonia		
Televisió de l'Hospitalet	Local	DVB-T: 26 UHF	Barcelonès		https://web.archive.org/web/20120505085334/http://www.televisiol-h.cat/
TV Mallorca	Local	DVB-T: 37 UHF	Mallorca	Sí	http://www.tvmallorca.net/
Televisió del Besopi	Local	DVB-T: 26 UHF	Barcelonès		
Televisió Pla de l'Estany	Local	PAL	Pla de l'Estany		https://televisioplaestany.blogspot.com/
Barça TV	Sports	DVB-T	Catalonia		
8TV	General	DVB-T	Catalonia		

== See also ==
- Lists of television channels
