= List of television stations in Andalusia =

List of television stations in Andalusia include the following:

== Autonomous channels ==
Name	Owner	Programming	Signal	Coverage	Created	Web
Canal Sur	RTVA	General	Digital and analog	Andalusia	—	http://www.canalsur.es//
Canal Sur 2	RTVA	General	Digital and analog	Andalusia	—	http://www.canalsur.es/
Canal Sur Andalucía	RTVA	Cultural and Tourism	Digital	Europe	—	http://www.canalsur.es/
Canal Sur HD	RTVA	HD	Digital and analog	Andalusia	—	http://www.canalsur.es//

== Provincial channels ==
=== Almería ===
Name	Owner	Programming	Signal	Based in	Created in	Web
Almería TV	Supercable Andalucia, S.A.	Local	Analog	Almería	—	—
Canal 28 TV	Canal 28 TV, S.A.	Local	Analog	Almería	—	—
Ejido TV	El Ejido, S.L.	Local	Analog	El Ejido	—	—
Huércal-Overa TV	Huércal-Overa Televisión, S.L.	Local	Analog	Huércal-Overa	—	—
Indalo TV	Grupo RTV Indalo S.L.	Local	Analog	Cuevas del Almanzora	—	—
Argar TV	Argar Televisión, S.L.	Local	Analog	Almería	—	—
C7 Roquetas	C7 Roquetas, S.A.	Local	Analog	Roquetas de Mar	—	—
Canal Almería JFL TV	Canal Almería, S.L.	Local	Analog	Almería	—	—
Canal Sí	Productora de Televisión de Almería, S.A.	Local	Analog	Roquetas de Mar	—	—

=== Cádiz ===
- Antena Bahía TV
- Canal Cádiz Televisión
- Canal Sierra de Cádiz TV
- Onda Chipiona Televisión
- Onda Jerez TV
- Onda Sur Televisión
- Ondaluz Televisión
- Telepuerto
- Tele Puerto Real
- Televisión del Sur
- Televisión San Roque
- Arcos Televisión
- Arlu
- Cable Televisión Conil
- Canal 43 Rota TV
- Canal 66
- Canal V TV
- CATV Rota
- Isla Televisión
- Olvera CATV
- Onda Bahía
- Onda Luz TV
- PDR TV Local Prado del Rey
- RTO (Radio Televisión Olvera)
- RTV Los Barrios
- Sintonía Seline La Línea
- TBC 90 Ubrique
- TBC Televisión Bahía de Cádiz
- TDC Sanlúcar
- Tele Barbate
- Tele Chipiona
- Tele Puerto
- Tele Rota
- Telealcalá del Valle
- TV Algeciras (Onda Algeciras TV)
- TV Campo de Gibraltar
- Videofaro I Chipiona

== See also ==
- Television in Spain
