= El Risitas =

Spanish comedian and actor (1956–2021)

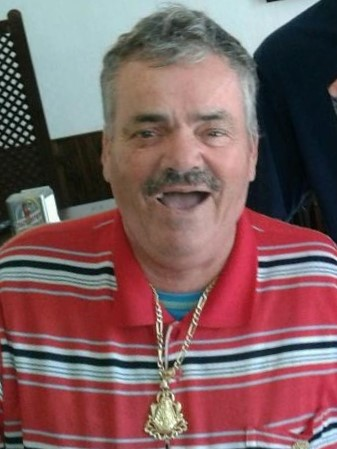
- Joya in 2015
- Born: Juan Joya Borja; 5 April 1956; Seville, Andalusia, Francoist Spain
- Died: 28 April 2021 (aged 65); Seville, Andalusia, Spain
- Occupations: Comedian; actor
- Years active: 2000–2021
- Television: 2000–2002: El Vagamundo, Canal 2 Andalucía; 2002–2005: Ratones Coloraos, Canal Sur Televisión; 2006–2007: El loco de la colina, La1; 2007–2012: El Gatopardo, Canal Sur
- Height: 170 cm (5 ft 7 in)

Juan Joya Borja (5 April 1956 – 28 April 2021) was a Spanish comedian and actor, better known by his stage name, El Risitas ([el ri.ˈsi.tas]; Andalusian Spanish: [e‿rːiˈsitah, ɛ‿rːɪˈsɪtæ]; lit. 'The Giggles'). He gained widespread popularity in 2015 thanks to a series of memes based on a television interview recorded in 2007 on Jesús Quintero's TV show Ratones Coloraos.

== Biography ==
Joya was born in Seville, in the Spanish autonomous community of Andalusia. He had a number of jobs throughout his life, including cooking, and unloading sacks of cement.

His first appearance on television was in 2001, on Jesús Quintero's show El Vagamundo, where he recalled, in a comedic tone, his experiences with "El Peíto", Antonio Rivero Crespo. He became recognizable for his high-pitched, wheezing laugh which was described in The Guardian as like a "dolphin with a 20-a-day habit", which led to his nickname. He also appeared in the 2005 film Torrente 3: el protector. When he became known internationally around 2015, he also performed for companies outside of Spain, for example in a Finnish commercial.

== Ratones Coloraos interview meme ==
In 2007, Joya appeared on Jesús Quintero's show Ratones Coloraos and described an incident when he worked as a kitchen porter. He had left some paella pans (paelleras) tied by sticks in the sand by the seashore overnight to let them soak and clean in the water, and when he returned the next morning to retrieve the pans, he found they had all washed out to sea with the high tide except for one. He frequently interrupts the story with his trademark laugh as he fails to keep his composure. The original video was uploaded to YouTube on 25 June 2007, and received over 1 million views eight years before the meme became widespread.

In March 2014, footage from the interview was used in Egypt by the then recently outlawed Muslim Brotherhood organization to parody presidential candidate Abdel Fattah el-Sisi. Other videos featuring footage from the interview were also produced, mostly apolitical parodies about technology and gaming. The most viewed versions of the video subtitled Joya as the designer of the Nvidia GeForce GTX 970 graphics card, a designer of Team Fortress 2, a Valve employee discussing Dota 2, a Canon representative discussing the C300 camera, an Xbox Live employee describing the platform's system, and a cinematographer describing shooting on a Red camera.

In March 2015, the meme received significant attention after the launch of the 2015 MacBook, where subtitles present Joya as a designer who worked on the prototype. Within a month, the video had received over five million views on YouTube. The meme's impact has been compared to parodies of the 2004 war drama Downfall, where scenes from the film are similarly edited with fake subtitles.

Another popular meme was published in April 2015 parodying a political affair in Slovakia known as the Váhostav affair, where Joya was subtitled by popular Slovak stand-up comedy performer Ján Gordulič.

In 2019, a zoomed-in still image of his face from the interview, named KEKW, was added as a 3rd-party emote for Twitch on FrankerFaceZ. As of April 2022, over 100,000 channels on Twitch have enabled the emote. With more than 400 million uses in chat, the emote occupies 10th place among the most popular FrankerFaceZ emotes.

== Health and death ==
In September 2020, Joya was admitted to the Hospital de la Caridad in Seville, where he underwent an intervention for a vascular problem and had a leg amputated.

Less than a year later, at noon on 28 April 2021, Joya was transferred from the Hospital de la Caridad to the Hospital Universitario Virgen del Rocío, after a sudden relapse. He died from complications of his illness later that afternoon at the age of 65.

== Filmography ==
- Torrente 3: el protector (2005)

== Television ==
- El Vagamundo (2000–2002) – Canal 2 Andalucía
- Ratones Coloraos (2002–2005) – Canal Sur Televisión
- El loco de la colina (2006–2007) – La 1
- El Gatopardo (2007–2012) – Canal Sur
