= Ratones coloraos =

Spanish TV talk show

- Genre: talk show
- Presented by: Jesús Quintero
- Starring: Jesús Quintero; El Pozí; El Risitas
- Country of origin: Spain
- Original language: Spanish
- No. of seasons: 2
- No. of episodes: 13

Production
- Running time: 60 minutes

Original release
- Network: Canal Sur; Telemadrid; ETB 2; 7RM; RTPA; TVE Internacional
- Release: 2 November 2002 – 2010

Ratones Coloraos ("Red Mice") was a Spanish premiere late-night television talk show series which was aired from 2002 to 2010. The television series was broadcast in two different time frames, from 2002 to 2005 and then from 2007 to 2010. The television series was presented by Jesús Quintero and the script was narrated by Javier Salvago. The television show was widely regarded as a premier television show in Spain as it included interviews with politicians and various celebrities from across the world. The show was broadcast on Canal Sur, Telemadrid, ETB 2, 7RM, RTPA and TVE Internacional.

== Cast ==
- Jesús Quintero in 13 episodes
- Pozi in nine episodes
- El Risitas in nine episodes

== History ==
=== First season (2002–2005) ===
In 2002, Jesus Quintero makes the jump to the first Andalusian chain with the television programme after spending four years in South Channel 2 with the vagabond, space that became very popular mainly due to the programs of zapping of other chains in which collected excerpts from interviews with characters such as Risitas, El Peíto and El Pozí.

Such change of chain meant a larger budget for production which considerably expanded the sets and included an unheard element in Quintero's programs: the live audience. During the first season aired in between the 20 November 2002 and June 2003, the one of Huelva manages to locate the space like the flagship of South Channel. The success meant that the Basque regional government, ETB, reached an agreement with the production company of the space to broadcast a series of thirteen programs during the summer resulting from the recovery of the one already broadcast in Andalusia. Although the Basque public did not receive it with the same enthusiasm and, after several schedule changes, ended up relegated almost in the morning with an average of 14.7% share.

In October 2003, South Channel released the second season of the program which was broadcast until September 2004. Unlike the previous one, 5 different sets were used in the second season and two new sections were included. Again, another FORTA channel would bet on the program by including it on its grid, Telemadrid, since April 2004, where it did not have the expected success stagnating at an average of 14.4% share. At this stage, the program became tremendously popular throughout Spain by offering the first interview given by Isabel Pantoja after her relationship with Julián Muñoz was made public. In the summer of the same year and after reaching an agreement with the producer of the space, TVE International broadcasts 13 programs with great success, especially in Latin America.

The premiere of the third season of Ratones Coloraos on Canal Sur was delayed until January 2005, remaining on the air until June. The space moved to prime time on Mondays, covering the space left vacant by Los Morancos. Quintero makes changes to the set and relies on a new director, David Gordon, film director, who permeated a much slower pace in the space. Nevertheless, this would be the season of greater success of the program until the moment, obtaining in the first delivery, where an exclusive interview with the Farruquito dancer was included, a 37.5% of share. In mid-February, Jesús Quintero is hospitalized due to an illness that was never made public, although the broadcast of the space was not interrupted thanks to the large amount of material he had left recorded. In September 2005, TVE announced the signing of the Andalusian communicator to present a program similar to La 1.

=== Second season (2007–2010) ===
After his adventure in a national medium, Quintero returned to the Andalusian region in September 2007 recovering the format of what years before had been Mice Coloraos: interviews, humor, live music and reflections, in prime time on Tuesday. As a novelty, the space is recorded on a new set that the journalist has built in the center of Seville, and again has the realization of Hugo Stuven, who already collaborated with him in the early stages of the 'space. A month later, Telemadrid trusts him again and schedules one-hour reissues on late night and prime time on Wednesdays. Once again, the Madrid public does not respond and the program is withdrawn after thirteen broadcasts. In April 2010, Canal Sur decided to withdraw the space due to lack of budget. In December 2012, it began to schedule rebroadcasts of the best programs in the mornings from Tuesday to Thursday.

== Legacy ==
The show also generated internet meme fest in 2015 based on one of the interviews in the program with popular comedian El Risitas which was aired in June 2007. El Risitas in the interview in June 2007 with Jesús Quintero described an incident when he worked as a kitchen porter. He describes leaving some paella pans (paelleras) at night in the ocean to soak and clean, and when in the morning he returned to retrieve the pans, they had washed out to sea with the tide. He frequently interrupts the story with his trademark laugh. The video clip of it became viral on Reddit and on YouTube in 2015 and created several memes based on his laugh.
