= Hugo Stuven =

Chilean-Spanish TV producer (1940–2021)

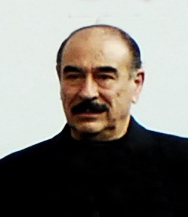
- Born: Hugo Stuven Cangas de Onís; 2 November 1940; Valparaíso, Chile
- Died: 24 April 2021 (aged 80); Madrid, Spain
- Occupations: TV producer and director
- Website: https://www.hugostuven.com

Hugo Stuven Cangas de Onís (2 November 1940 – 24 April 2021) was a Chilean-born Spanish TV producer for Televisión Española.

== Biography and career ==
Hugo Stuven was born in Valparaíso, Chile on 2 November 1940 as the son of a banker and a judge. He arrived in Spain in 1965 after he asked a compatriot who worked in radio for a job, and, as he had worked in television in his country, he opted for Televisión Española, joining in 1966. He worked alongside Enrique Martí Maqueda as a director. Later, as assistant director, Stuven collaborated with established professionals of the station such as Pilar Miró, Pedro Amalio López and Fernando Navarrete on programs such as Antena Infantil (1972-1974), Tarde para todos (1974) and Todo es posible en domingo.

In the mid-seventies, he began his career as a director, at the head of programs such as Más allá, with Fernando Jiménez del Oso. However, it was in music, entertainment and variety programs where Stuven deployed his skills, and transferred his brand to such emblematic programs in the history of TVE like Voces a 45 (1975-1976), with Pepe Domingo Castaño and Aplauso (1978-1982); "Rock and Ríos", the legendary concert of Miguel Ríos (1982); "Especial Serrat", with Joan Manuel Serrat (TVE 1982); El Rock de una Noche de Verano, Miguel Ríos' concert in Barcelona (TVE 1983); Rock en el ruedo with Miguel Ríos (TVE 1984); Especial Camilo Sesto; Concierto desde Mallorca (TVE 1983) and Concierto de Miguel Bosé (TVE 1983).

He also directed advertising spots, among them in 1982 that of Freixenet with Norma Duval, Cheryl Ladd and Ann-Margret.

In the 1980s, he directed Como Pedro por su casa (1985), with Pedro Ruiz, and the New Year's Eve Specials of 1987, "Súper 88" with Carmen Maura and Arturo Fernández, and 1988, with Martes y 13, Hola Hola 89.

In 1987 and 1988, he was appointed by Pilar Miró as head of the Design and Promotions Section of TVE, in which the promotion system and the opening titles of the programs were changed. He hired Nacho Cano for the music of some of the openings.

Between 1989 and 1991 he directed for TVE Pero.... ¿esto qué es?, which was the television debut of the duo Cruz y Raya, Ángel Garó, Pepe Viyuela, Faemino y Cansado and Las Virtudes, and Caliente, with Ana Obregón, Rody Aragón and Fofito.

Subsequently, he was hired by private television channels, and made, among other programs, El Gordo with Irma Soriano (Antena 3, 1993); Uno para todas (1995-1996), with Goyo González and Popstars (2002), with Jesús Vázquez. He was also in charge of the Miss Spain galas from 1998 to 2002 for Telecinco, the Gala de la Hispanidad for Telecinco from 1999 to 2001, the Gala de los Premios Amigo with Andreu Buenafuente for Telecinco (2000), the Gala de los Premios TP de Oro and many other live programs.

He also worked with Jesús Quintero on Ratones coloraos (2002-2004), on Canal Sur; El loco de la colina (2006), on TVE; and La noche de Quintero, on TVE (2007). In 2006, he published the autobiographical book Quién te ha visto y quién T.VE - Historias de mi tele. Also during 2008 he produced and directed five documentary sections for Canal Sur television under the title La guerra de la Independencia en Andalucía, on the occasion of the bicentenary of this event.

In July 2008, he received the award for Best Director for the program Ratones coloraos.

In 2009, he continued making the series Ratones coloraos by Jesús Quintero in its 9th season for Canal Sur, as well as the first season of Paz en la Tierra, presented by Paz Padilla, being replaced by Víctor Rivero in the second season. At the same time, the channel commissioned him to make a documentary for Canal Sur 2, with recreations in Córdoba province of the Battle of Munda, which was the last battle of Julius Caesar before he was assassinated.

In 2010 he continued with the 9th season of Ratones coloraos as director and preparing new projects for various channels. In 2011 he directed the Gala Innocente, innocente for Antena 3, presented by Juan y Medio and Cristina Urgel. He also directed the Gala Una Noche única de la ONCE on TVE on 11 November 2011. This is the occasion of Lolita with her brother Antonio, both on the set of the Gala. He also conducted and directed a new Mister and Miss Spain gala from Seville through TDT Metropolitan TV and directed El Disco del Año in its seventh year, broadcast in December by TVE.

In 2012, Hugo directed a gala broadcast by TVE La 1 where he brought together most of the Spanish humorists in a great tribute to the late comedian Miguel Gila. Sponsored by Campofrío after the spot directed by Álex de la Iglesia, Hugo, together with Grupo Vértice, took the helm of this special gala entitled Arriba ese Ánimo, presented by Santiago Segura. He also directed another gala on 24 December 2012 titled Bailando y Cantando contigo for TVE where TVE presenters and singers such as Rosa López and Daniel Diges, presented by comedian Carlos Latre, participated.

In 2013 and 2014, he directed two seasons of the program Desexos Cumpridos (Wishes Fulfilled) for TVG (Galician Autonomous Television).

Between 2014 and 2015, he directed, made and co-wrote three documentaries about olive oil, El Oro de Andalucía (The Gold of Andalusia), spending a year filming and editing in Andalusia, following the process from the planting of the olive trees, through the flowering, harvest, oil mills, packaging, to being consumed. These documentaries were broadcast on Canal Sur Televisión.

In the 2017–2018 academic year, he began teaching Music Making (Theory and Practices) at the Official Institute of Spanish Radio Television, where he continued as a teacher until his death.

From 2018, he was part of the creative team of the NGO Voces as a volunteer. In 2020, he directed the documentary La voz de la Cañada about the illegal settlement of Cañada Real for the NGO in co-production with TVE and SGAE and the collaboration of the RTVE Institute and volunteer students.

== Personal life and death ==
Hugo Stuven had ten children (one of them adopted), among them the director and screenwriter Hugo Stuven Casasnovas.

Stuven died on 24 April 2021, at the age of 80, from COVID-19 at Hospital Isabel Zendal in Madrid a few days after getting the Pfizer COVID-19 vaccine during the pandemic in Spain. He already had the virus before getting his vaccine, but this was not known at the time.
