= La Séptima =

- Country: Spain
- Broadcast area: Spain, reaching bordering regions via overspill of the Spanish terrestrial network
- Headquarters: San Sebastián de los Reyes, Madrid

Programming
- Picture format: 1080i HDTV

Ownership
- Owner: Servicios Integrados Entretenimiento Televisivo
- Key people: José Miguel Contreras (director); Javier Ruiz (news director)

History
- Launched: 5 November 2026; 17 days ago

Links
- Website: La Séptima TV

La Séptima is a Spanish nationwide free-to-air television channel owned and operated by Servicios Integrados Entretenimiento Televisivo (SIETE), that began broadcasting on 5 November 2026. Its programming lineup will be based on current affairs, political analysis, talk shows, and entertainment, with a strong emphasis on live broadcasts and own productions.

The project is directed by audiovisual producer and executive José Miguel Contreras, while its slogan is 'Your ideas are yours. The conversation belongs to everyone.' (Spanish: Tus ideas son tuyas. La conversación es de todos.)

== History ==
=== Origins of SIETE ===
On 16 October 2025, the third government of Pedro Sánchez approved a public tender for a new nationwide digital television license. It was the first national television licence to be put out to public tender in Spain in more than a decade, since Mariano Rajoy’s first government awarded six television licences in October 2015 to Atresmedia, Mediaset España, the Spanish Episcopal Conference, Real Madrid CF, KISS Media and Grupo Secuoya, which subsequently launched the channels Atreseries, Be Mad, TRECE, Real Madrid TV, DKISS and TEN, respectively.

In this context, Servicios Integrados Entretenimiento Televisivo, S. L., also known by its acronym SIETE, was incorporated in Madrid on 5 November 2025, with a share capital of €3,000 and the aim of participating in the public tender. Its corporate purpose included television programming, broadcasting, and video distribution activities. Andrés Varela Entrecanales was appointed sole administrator. Various media outlets linked the origins of the project to disagreements between a portion of PRISA's shareholders and the group's management. According to published reports, some shareholders initially raised the possibility of integrating a new television channel into PRISA's structure, an initiative that ultimately developed independently.

Apart from SIETE, only Mediaset España participated in the public tender. Mediaset España was already the media company holding the largest number of television licences in Spain, with seven national television channels. The Council of Ministers resolved the tender on 26 May 2026, granting SIETE the right to operate a nationwide television channel on the MPE5 digital multiplex in HD resolution for a renewable 15-year term. Following the award of the license, a capital increase of €397,000 was registered on 8 June 2026, bringing the subscribed capital to €400,000.

=== Public announcement and preparations ===
In the days following the outcome of the public tender, numerous media outlets began speculating about the final name the channel would adopt, with alternatives including SIETE, La 7, La Séptima and La Sep7ima. The number 7 has traditionally been used by many regional and municipal television channels in Spain, such as La 7 in the Region of Murcia and TPA7 in Asturias. In addition, Mediaset España operated a television channel called LaSiete between 2009 and 2014.

The channel publicly unveiled the name La Séptima and its visual identity on 7 July 2026. The logo was designed by Miguel Ángel Pérez, the project’s creative director, and uses coral as its corporate colour. The symbol consists of seven open lines. According to the explanation provided, the seven open lines are intended to represent an open project with room for growth. The typeface was constructed from compact blocks and designed to evoke the visual impact of newspaper headlines.

In a series of interviews discussing the channel’s launch, Contreras stated that he would seek to recruit prominent figures from other major television groups in the country. Among the earliest names to be rumoured, as early as the start of July 2026, was Javier Ruiz. At the time, Ruiz was one of the most prominent figures of Spain’s public broadcaster RTVE, where he hosted the programme Mañaneros 360, which led the ratings in the morning time slot. José Miguel Contreras had stated that he and Ruiz had participated more than two years earlier in designing a television project for PRISA that ultimately did not materialize. Following the broadcast of Mañaneros 360 on 7 August, Ruiz announced his departure from RTVE and his new role as editorial director of La Séptima’s news division.

The channel’s second signing was announced on 13 August 2026, with Rocío Delgado, who until recently had hosted the programme O Termómetro on TVG, the regional television broadcaster of Galicia. She was followed on 17 August 2026 by the signings of model Alba Carrillo, who is associated with the Spanish celebrity press, and presenter Marta Márquez, who were recruited to host the channel’s first confirmed programme, the magazine show Fuera de control.

Prior to the start of its regular broadcasts, La Séptima organised La Séptima On Tour, a promotional tour across several Spanish cities to introduce the channel's project and the television format it had announced, centred on live current affairs, analysis and debate.

=== Launch ===
La Séptima began broadcasting on 5 November 2026. The channel's signal became available at midnight. Live programming commenced at 12:00 PM with El pulso, hosted by Verónica Sanz. Special guests were invited to attend the channel's launch day, including Gabriel Rufián, leader of Republican Left of Catalonia; Carlos Cuerpo, Deputy Prime Minister, and singer-songwriter Víctor Manuel.

== Controversies ==
On 27 July 2026, national conservative political party VOX filed an administrative appeal before the Audiencia Nacional against the award of the national DTT licence to SIETE. VOX maintains that the award procedure violated the principles that should govern licensing procedures and that the decision was not in accordance with the law. These assertions are those of the appellant and do not constitute a judicial ruling on the legality of the licence award.
