= À Punt =

- Logo used since 2017
- Country: Spain
- Broadcast area: Valencian Community; International
- Network: À Punt Mèdia
- Headquarters: Burjassot, Horta Nord, Valencian Community

Programming
- Language: Valencian (Note: Also in Spanish for films.)
- Picture format: 1080i HDTV

Ownership
- Owner: Corporació Valenciana de Mitjans de Comunicació

History
- Launched: 30 August 2017; 8 years ago (test broadcasts); 10 June 2018; 7 years ago (regular programming)

Links
- Website: À Punt Media

Availability

Terrestrial
- Digital: Provinces: Valencia: 29; Castellón: 38; Alicante: 25

Streaming media
- IPTV: Movistar Plus+: 9

À Punt (Valencian: [ˈa ˈpunt]) is a Valencian free-to-air public broadcast television channel owned and operated by Corporació Valenciana de Mitjans de Comunicació. It is the corporation's flagship and currently only television channel, and broadcasts mainstream programming mainly in the Valencian language. It is part of FORTA.

The channel began regular broadcasts on 25 April 2018, as a successor of the defunct Nou, Nou 24 and Nou Dos, and is broadcast through the same multiplex.

== Availability ==
À Punt is available exclusively in the Valencian Community. Originally, it was intended to also be available in other Catalan-speaking territories, namely Catalonia and Balearic Islands, as is the case with TV3 and IB3 respectively, and to recover the defunct broadcasting of these channels in the area, but the Spanish government rejected the multiplex needed to establish it.

=== Terrestrial ===
- Valencia (province): Channel 29
- Castellón (province): Channel 38
- Alicante (province): Channel 25

=== IPTV ===
- Movistar Plus+: Channel 9

== History ==
=== Background ===
On 29 November 2013, the former Valencian television channels, Nou, Nou 24 and Nou Dos, operated by Radiotelevisió Valenciana, abruptly ceased broadcasting as Alberto Fabra, president of the Generalitat Valenciana from 2011 to 2015, announced their closure. The shutdown followed a debt of €1.3 billion and continuous scandals of censorship and manipulation, such as information on the Gürtel case or the metro accident in Valencia in 2006. After a ruling from the High Court of Justice of the Valencian Community, the workers were laid off and the company was liquidated.

In the summer of 2015, the new Valencian government of Ximo Puig started procedures to relaunch Valencian television, waiting for the Corts Valencianes to approve a definitive model. A provisional channel began broadcasting, with hardly any workers, prerecorded content, films, or series Nou had already acquired.

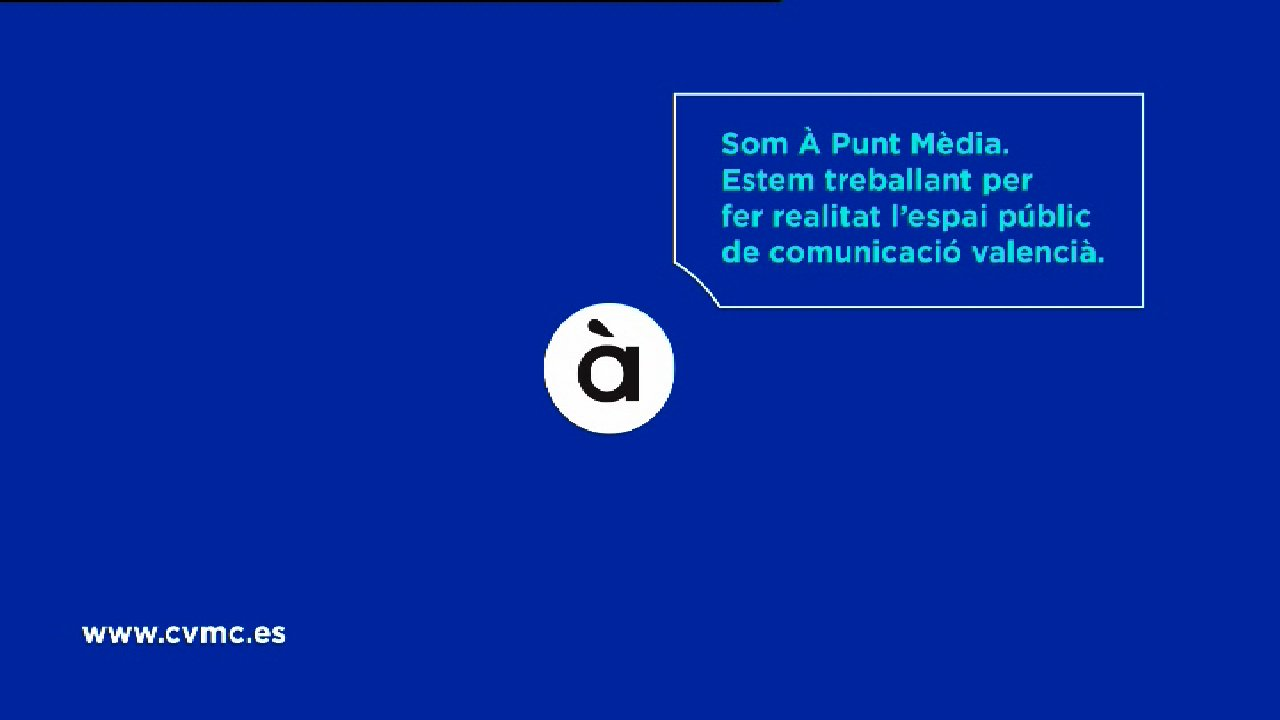
Test card shown on the three former Valencian channels on 30 August 2017. The text, in Valencian, reads "We are À Punt Mèdia. We are working to make the Valencian public communication space a reality".

=== Creation ===
On 14 July 2016, the Corts approved with 64 votes in favour (PSPV, Compromís, Podemos and Ciutadans) and 26 abstentions (PP) a law proposal for the creation of the Valencian Media Corporation. On 30 August 2017, the new Valencian television started broadcasting a test card presenting the new name as À Punt Media. By December, the test card began broadcasting audio from the new À Punt FM.

=== Launch ===
On December 18, 2017, the first broadcasts began on the À Punt website, displaying the existing Valencian dubs of Doraemon, Hamtaro and Case Closed.

Regular broadcasts began on 10 June 2018, with full 24-hour programming. The channel's launch was realised at 14:30 CEST, with the first edition of À Punt Notícies, a 45-minute news report presented by Adelaida Ferre and Vanessa Gregori.

== Audiences ==
À Punt's audience was not measured until October 2018, four months after the start of broadcasts. Although the first week of the month it reached 2.4%, from the second week onwards, it dropped to 1.4%, far from the set target of 4%. Towards the end of the first year, the average audience was 2%, with Doraemon leading the audience with a 6% share.

In the summer of 2019, the station increased its audience with a share of 2.4%. For the autumn and winter season, the television schedule changed with more information timespaces and a new season for comedy programme Assumptes Interns.

By late 2022, À Punt reached an average audience higher than state-wide Spanish channels La Sexta and La 2. In March 2023, À Punt reached its highest monthly audience, with a 4.4% share.

	January	February	March	April	May	June	July	August	September	October	November	December	Yearly average
2018	-	-	-	-	-	-	-	-	-	1.2%	1.4%	1.3%	1.4%
2019	1.3%	1.5%	2.5%	1.9%	2.2%	2.0%	2.3%	2.5%	2.7%	2.3%	1.9%	2.2%	2.3%
2020	2.5%	1.9%	3.2%	3.3%	3.2%	2.9%	2.6%	2.5%	3.0%	3.5%	3.7%	3.7%	3%
2021	3.6%	3.2%	3.6%	3.7%	4.0%	3.6%	2.8%	2.8%	3.4%	3.0%	3.4%	3.2%	3.4%
2022	2.9%	2.9%	3.9%	3.0%	3.0%	3.2%	2.7%	3.2%	3.3%	3.1%	3.3%	3.0%	3.1%
2023	3.6%	3.7%	4.4%	2.9%	3.2%	3.1%	2.4%	2.2%	3.0%	2.5%	-	-	-

== See also ==
- Nou (TV channel)
- Radiotelevisió Valenciana
- Valencian Media Corporation
