= RTVA =

RTVA may refer to the following:

- Ràdio i Televisió d'Andorra, the public service broadcaster of the Principality of Andorra
- Radio y Televisión de Andalucía, the public service broadcaster of Andalucía, Spain
