= His Majesty The King's Christmas Message =

Christmas message by the monarch of Spain

His Majesty The King's Christmas Message (Spanish: Mensaje de Navidad de S.M. el Rey) is the annual broadcast by the Spanish monarch on Christmas Eve. It has taken place every year since 1975, the first year of Juan Carlos I's reign. The speech is aired on all Spanish TV channels.

== Broadcast ==
The message typically combines a chronicle of that year's major events, with specific focus on politics, economy, culture and social affairs, and also the sovereign's own personal feelings on Christmas. It is usually not broadcast until 21:00 on 24 December.

== Recurrent topics ==
During his reign, King Juan Carlos I usually covered the main problems of the nation, such as ETA. In 2004, the speech was highly related to the Madrid train bombings earlier that year; in 2006 the King discussed the need to become a united nation against terrorism (in implicit support of Prime Minister José Luis Rodríguez Zapatero's anti-terrorist policies) and he mentioned the increasing force of immigrants in Spain and appreciated their contribution to the economy.

== Special speeches ==
Monarch	Date	Theme
Juan Carlos I	24 February 1981	1981 Spanish coup d'état attempt
Juan Carlos I	11 March 2004	2004 Madrid train bombings
Juan Carlos I	23 March 2014	Death of Adolfo Suárez
Juan Carlos I	2 June 2014	Abdication of Juan Carlos I
Felipe VI	3 October 2017	2017 Catalan independence referendum
Felipe VI	18 March 2020	COVID-19 pandemic in Spain

== In popular culture ==
- During his reign, Juan Carlos began his speeches with the phrase "La reina y yo" ("The Queen and I"). This was commonly considered his main catchphrase and as such has often been parodied by media. A comic strip in El Jueves magazine about the monarchy takes his title from this. In a departure from his father's custom, King Felipe VI started his 2015 speech with the phrase "Buenas noches" (Good evening).
- The King's speech has been parodied in many television shows such as Buenafuente.
- Mariano Rajoy's speech on the occasion of the National Day of Spain received left-wing criticism because it bore a resemblance to the King's Christmas speech. Rajoy delivered his message seated near the flag of Spain and in a medium shot, just as royal speeches usually are.
