= Canal Extremadura Televisión =

- Country: Spain

Programming
- Picture format: 1080i HDTV

Ownership
- Owner: CEXMA

History
- Launched: 15 February 2006

Links
- Website: www.canalextremadura.es

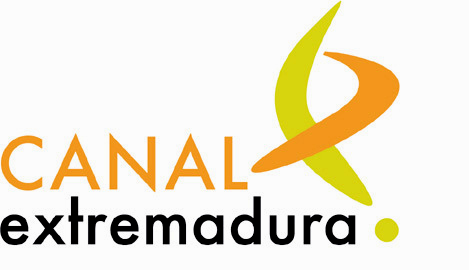
Canal Extremadura Televisión's second logo from 2005 to 2012

Canal Extremadura Televisión is a public television network of Extremadura. The television is owned and operated by CEXMA.

== History ==
In 2001 the government of Extremadura and the opposition parties began negotiations for the creation of a public television channel in Extremadura, however, the negotiations failed. After this, an agreement was signed between the governments of Extremadura and Andalusia that created "Canal Sur Extremadura", it was a version of the Andalusian channel Canal Sur which had programs aimed at Extremadura. Canal Sur Extremadura was broadcast between September 8, 2001 and June 30, 2002, when the signal was suspended by court order that challenged the award process for the production of the channel's regional programming.

After the closure of Canal Sur Extremadura, the autonomous community was left without its own public television until the creation of Canal Extremadura was announced in 2005, beginning its official programming on February 15, 2006.

Although Canal Extremadura is not affiliated with FORTA, there are some agreements for the purchase of content generated by this union.

== Programming ==
Canal Extremadura broadcasts general programming, especially focused on information and entertainment. Due to its status, the channel broadcasts some public service programs such as employment or integration services for people with disabilities, as well as content on agriculture, livestock or fishing due to the high presence of the rural population in the region. The channel also broadcasts some programs about the life and culture of Extremadura along with general entertainment such as series and movies.
