= Flor Almón =

Spanish politician

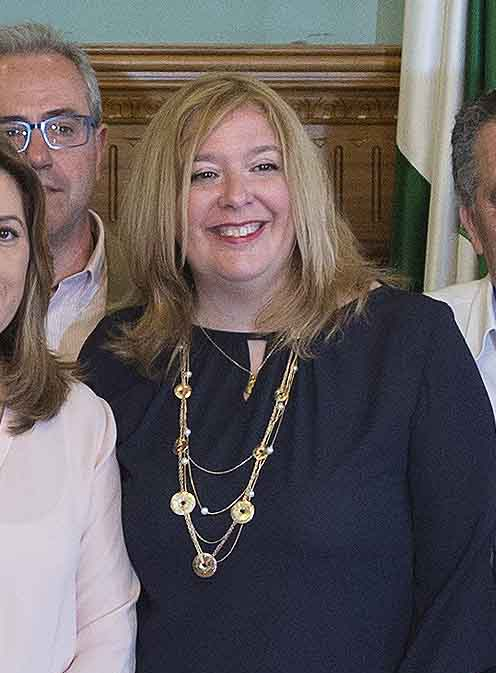
- Born: María Flor Almón Fernández; January 15, 1971 (age 54); Motril
- Occupation: Spanish politician

María Flor Almón Fernández (Motril, January 15, 1971) is a Spanish politician from the Spanish Socialist Workers' Party (PSOE) who served as the mayor of Motril from 2015 to 2019. She was also a member of the Andalusian Parliament during the 8th and 9th legislatures.

== Career ==
Born on January 15, 1971, in Motril (Granada province), she joined the Spanish Socialist Workers' Party (PSOE) in 1992. Flor Almón graduated from the Complutense University of Madrid in 1995, getting a degree in Political Science. She specialized in International Relations.

In 2008, she became the general secretary of the Motril Socialist group, succeeding Manuel García Albarral. She is a member of the Regional Executive Commission of the PSOE of Andalusia (CER).

She served as a deputy in the Andalusian Parliament during the 8th and 9th legislatures, where she was part of several commissions, including Environment, Presidency, Culture, Education, Development, Tourism and Sport (as vice president), and RTVA (Radio y Televisión de Andalucía). In 2011, she became the spokesperson for the Socialist Municipal Group in the Motril City Council.

Flor Almón was elected mayor of Motril in 2015, succeeding Luisa García Chamorro (Partido Popular) after reaching a government agreement with the Andalusian Party and securing the support of United Left in the investiture.

In 2019, she moved to the opposition and has since served as the spokesperson for the Socialist Municipal Group in the Motril City Council.
