= Canal Nou Internacional =

Spanish television channel

- Country: Spain

Ownership
- Owner: Ràdio Televisió Valenciana

History
- Former names: Canal Comunitat Valenciana (CCV) (1997-2005); Televisió Valenciana Internacional (TVVi) (2005-2010)

Links
- Website: Official Website

Canal Nou Internacional (Valencian pronunciation: [kaˈnal ˈnɔw inteɾnasi.oˈnal]) was a Spanish television channel from the Valencian Community operated by Ràdio Televisió Valenciana. It was created with the intention of approaching Valencia to the valencian community around the world, as well as promoting it to the rest of citizens of those areas. Thus its area of distribution was bigger than those of the three autonomous terrestrial broadcast channels (Canal Nou, Canal Nou Dos and Canal Nou 24) and that its programming was a mix of content from the three regional channels, but usually with greater presence Canal Nou Dos content, as they are self-produced programs. These were joined by the reports, which are broadcast on Canal Nou and Canal Nou 24 as well as some sports.

The channel was known as Canal Comunitat Valenciana (CCV) until 5 May 2005, changing its name on that day to Televisió Valenciana Internacional (TVVi). On 6 September 2010 the channel changed its name again, this time to Canal Nou International. Its contents were almost exclusively in Valencian language.

== Reception ==
The reception of the channel could be made through the Hispasat satellite and the various cable TV operators, but by 16 July 2010 the channel broadcast exclusively through the Internet, ceasing its broadcasts by other platforms without notice due to accumulated debts with Telefónica de Sistemas. On 1 March 2011 all references and links to the channel were removed from Radiotelevisió Valenciana's site, but the page where the broadcast could be followed is still active, broadcasting their original Canal Nou and Canal Nou Dos content and a test card broadcasting Ràdio Nou, when the contents broadcast by those channels cannot be streamed by Internet.

== Logos ==
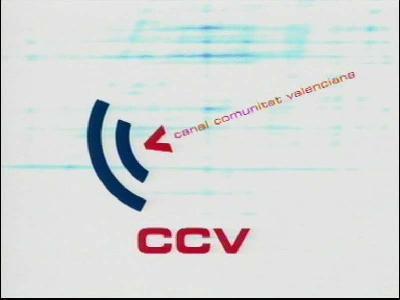
Logo as Canal Comunitat Valenciana, from 1997 to 2005.

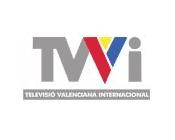
Logo as TVVI, from 2005 to 2008.

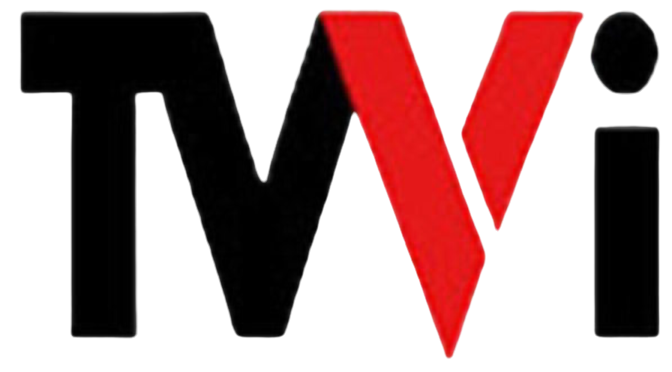
Second logo as TVVI from 2008 to 2010.

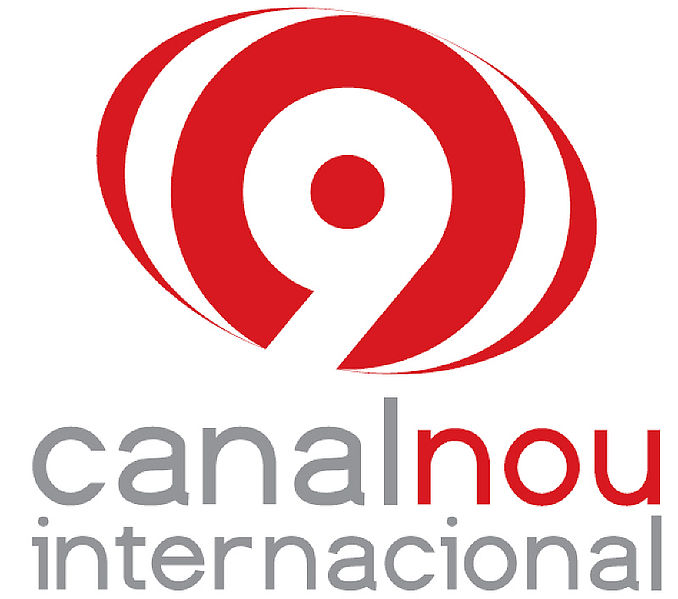
Logo as Canal 9 Internacional.

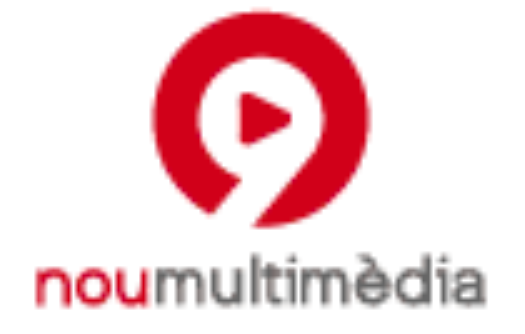
Logo of the online channel Canal 9 Multimèdia from 2011 to 2013.

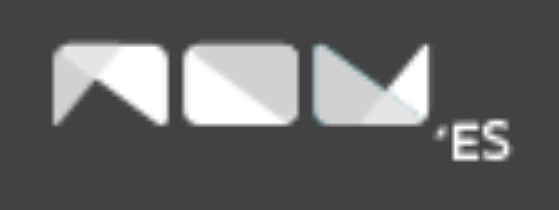
LLogo of the online channel NOU ES from 9 October to 29 November 2013.
