= RTPA =

RTPA or rtPA may refer to:

- Radiotelevisión del Principado de Asturias, a public broadcasting company in Asturias, Spain
- Real-time process algebra, a set of new mathematical notations for formally describing system architectures, and static and dynamic behaviors
- Recombinant tissue plasminogen activator, a protein involved in the breakdown of blood clots
- Release to Production Acceptance, (in IT systems management) a methodology used to consistently and successfully deploy application systems into a production environment regardless of platform.
