= Hora 25 de los Negocios =

Hora 25 de los Negocios (25th Hour of Business) was an informative and economical analysis show for the Spain radio station, Cadena SER. The show brought in the highest rating numbers amongst a group of shows concerning economical information, with a record of 340,000 listeners in the night. The show was hosted by Javier Ruiz.

== Program description ==
The show ran on weekday evenings from 21:30 to 22:00 and included a summary of all financial and economical information of the day, as well as the most important information is explained in more depth by several experts, and explaining the causes and possible consequences of such information.

The program was divided into three branches of information:

- Marketing and banking information, useful for investors.
- Broad economic discussion.
- Enterprises, from specific names of the protagonists to the represented sectors.

In the show, as guests, there have been important entrepreneurs and economists from the country and foreigners, the range covering from Luis Ángel Rojo, former Governor of the Bank of Spain, up to the Nobel Prize in Economics winner, Joseph E. Stiglitz, covering also some other famous people in economics, like Rodrigo Rato, Miguel Sebastián, Ana Patricia Botín and Magda Salarich.
