= Canal Sur Andalucía =

- Country: Andalusia
- Broadcast area: Worldwide

Ownership
- Owner: Radio y Televisión de Andalucía

History
- Launched: February 1996
- Former names: Andalucía Televisión

Canal Sur Andalucía, formerly known as Andalucía Television, shows the image of the Andalusia region of Spain to a global television audience via Canal Sur and Canal Sur 2.

Andalucía Televisión started broadcasting in February 1996. The Public Agency works for its thematic channels, programmes productions, corporate videos, advertising spots, documentaries, etc.

== History ==
In October 1995, RTVA approved a proposal to start satellite broadcasts, which would cost 300 million pesetas. The channel was suggested from Andalusians in other Spanish regions who wanted to see images and news of the region elsewhere in Spain.

The channel started broadcasting on 28 February 1996 as Canal Sur Satélite. Although it shared the same name as the main RTVA channel, it had its own programming, limited to a five-hour package of programming, consisting of news and cultural output. The channel was the first FORTA channel to deliver its programming via satellite legally, after a trial broadcast by Televisió de Catalunya Satèl·lit the previous year. The service was delivered through the Hispasat satellite and aimed to cater the Andalusian diaspora and their descendants, largely found in the Americas. On 26 February 1997, it made its first anniversary broadcast live from Barcelona. Earlier that month, Telefónica notified RTVA that it had to move its broadcasts to the Astra satellite as Retevisión proposed a better offer for the broadcaster. With this, it announced that it would double the amount of airtime (from six hours a day to twelve). In an initial phase until summer, Canal Sur Satélite broadcast on both satellites, before moving exclusively to Astra. With the move, the possibility of launching it on Canal Satélite Digital came, a fact that caused controversy in the region. After the 1997 RTVA rebrand, it was renamed Andalucía Televisión. Thanks to a July 1997 agreement, broadcasts on Hispasat continued after signing up with Vía Digital.

In December 2007, Andalucía Televisión began delivering a live feed of the channel on its website, coinciding with the launch of RTVA's VOD section.
