= Javier Ruiz (news anchor) =

Spanish journalist

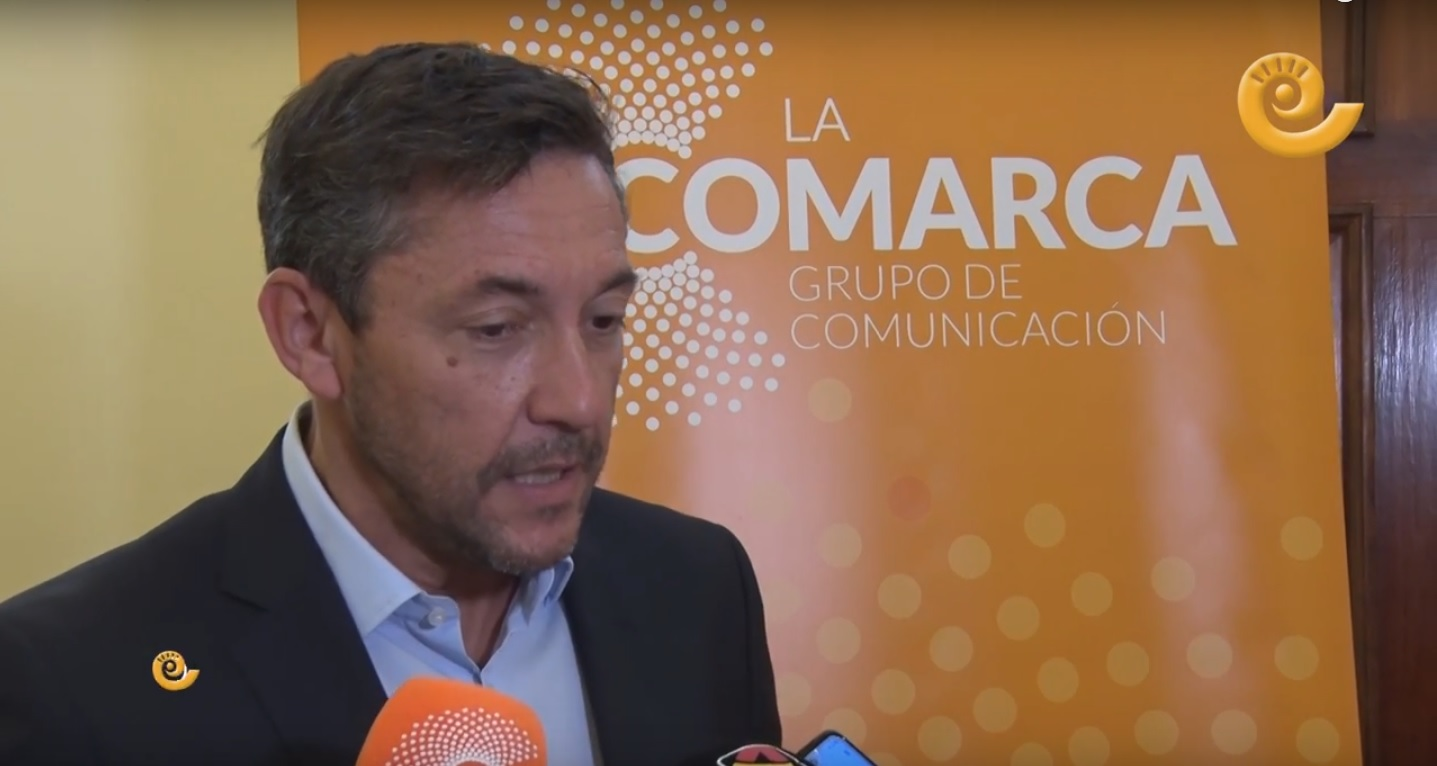
- Ruiz in 2021
- Born: Javier Ruiz Pérez; 18 August 1973; Valencia, Spain
- Education: Universidad CEU San Pablo; University of Columbia
- Occupations: Journalist, TV presenter
- Partner: Sarah Santaolalla (2024-present)
- Writing career
- Years active: 1995–present

Javier Ruiz Pérez (born 18 August 1973) is a Spanish journalist and television presenter. He holds a degree in Journalism from CEU Cardenal Herrera University as well as a master’s degree in International Economics and Journalism from Columbia University. He is currently the news director for La Séptima, an upcoming television channel in Spain.

Ruiz was Chief Editor at Cadena SER, and host of the business show "Hora 25 de los Negocios".

He was fired in 2011 after Cuatro was purchased by Telecinco.
