= Jesús Quintero =

Spanish journalist and television presenter (1940–2022)

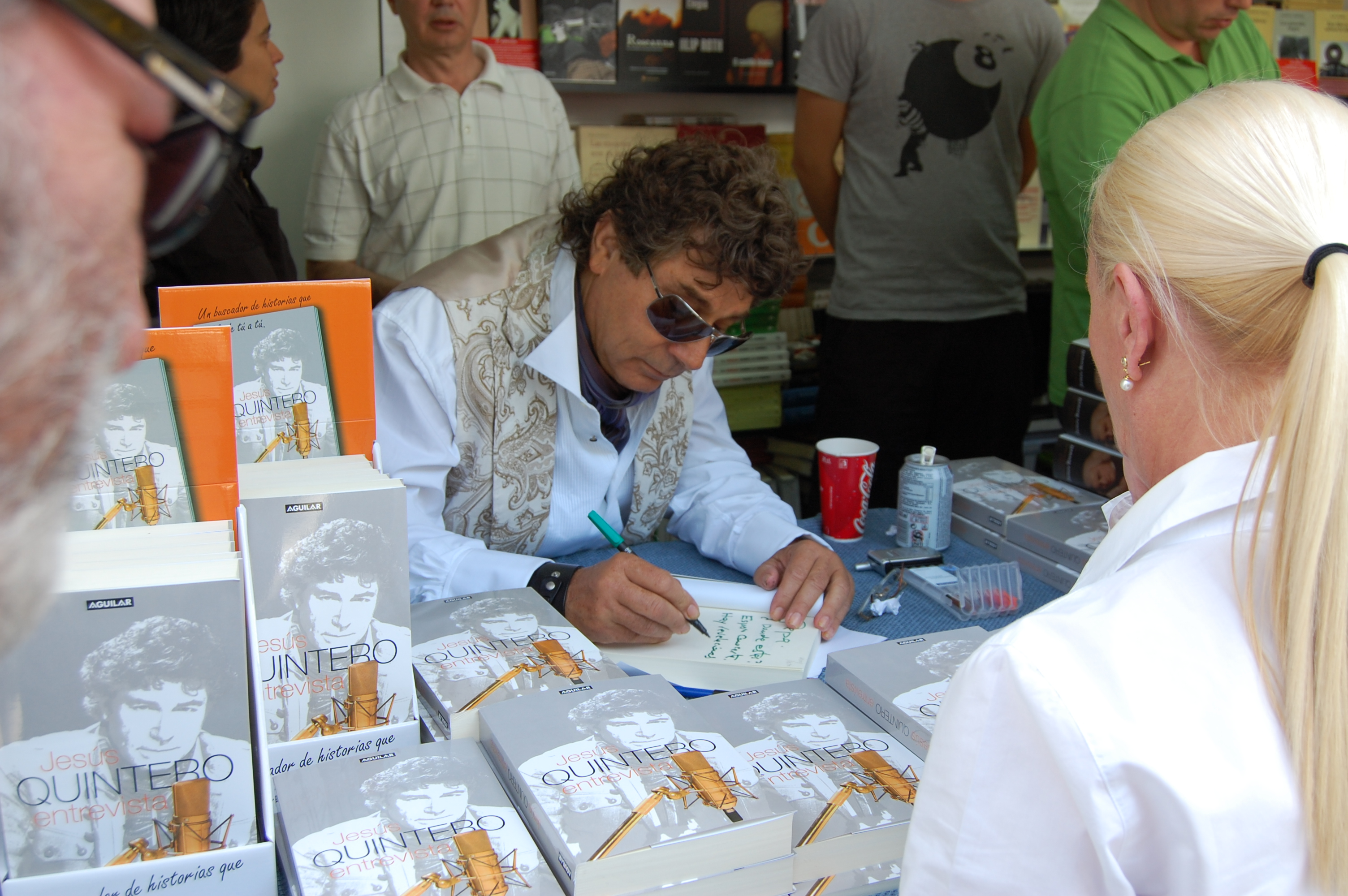
Quintero signing in Madrid Book Fair 2007

Jesús Rodríguez Quintero (18 August 1940 – 3 October 2022) was a Spanish journalist, editor and presenter of Spanish programs in radio and television, known in the media as Jesús Quintero.

== Biography ==
Quintero was born in San Juan del Puerto, Huelva, Spain, on 18 August 1940. He was introduced into the theatrical world and began his career at Radio Popular in Huelva, From there he worked in Seville and Madrid. One of his first successes was with RNE (Radio Nacional de España) in 1973, which began a long career as a presenter. His first program was Studio 15–18, presented with Marisol Valle. It was a great success and the star program in the attempted normalization of public radio programming that passed from dictatorship to a new period.

Quintero's flagship program, with schemes that would revolutionize the media was El hombre de la roulot (Man of Roulotte) and El loco de la colina (The fool on the hill), which made him a social phenomenon even outside Spain, Argentina or Uruguay.

Quintero also appeared as a lecturer in the teaching world, such as when he delivered the conference Journalism and Commitment on 17 October 2002 at the Faculty of Communication Sciences of the University of Málaga, on his tenth anniversary. After this speech, he unveiled a plaque to baptize one of the classrooms of the center with his name, sign of respect and admiration that produces the journalist.

Quintero was producer of the singer Soledad Bravo and guitarist Paco de Lucía.

Quintero was author of the books Trece noches (Thirteen nights) (1999) with Antonio Gala, Cuerda de presos (Prisoners Rope) (1997) and Jesús Quintero: entrevista (Jesús Quintero: Interview) (2007).

Quintero died on 3 October 2022, at the age of 82 at the Nuestra Señora de los Remedios residence in Ubrique, Cádiz, due to respiratory failure, according to family sources, while taking a nap. He is buried in the San Juan del Puerto municipal cemetery in Huelva.

== In radio ==
- Música de los cinco continentes (Music from five continents)
- Círculo internacional (International circle)
- Estudio 15/18 (Studio 15/18)
- A 120
- Ciudades (Cities)
- El hombre de la Roulotte (Man of Roulotte)
- Tres a las tres (Three to three)
- Andalucía Viva (Andalucía alive)
- El loco de la colina (The fool on the hill) (1981–1986), RNE and Cadena Ser
- El lobo estepario (Steppenwolf), 1992, Onda Cero
- Entre dos luces (Between two lights), 2002

== In television ==
- El perro verde (The green dog), 1988, in TVE
- Qué sabe nadie (Does anyone know), 1990–1991, in Canal Sur
- Trece noches (Thirteen nights), 1991–1992, in Canal Sur
- La boca del lobo (The mouth of the wolf), 1992–1993, in Antena 3
- Cuerda de presos (Chain gang), 1995–1996, in Antena 3
- El Vagamundo, 1999–2002, in Canal Sur
- Ratones coloraos, 2002–2004, in Canal Sur
- El loco de la colina (The fool on the hill), 2006, in TVE
- La noche de Quintero (The night of Quintero), 2007, in TVE
- Ratones coloraos, 2002–2010, in Canal Sur, Telemadrid and 7 Región de Murcia
- El mundo de Jesús Quintero (The world of Jesús Quintero), summer 2008, in Canal Sur
- El gatopardo, 2010–20??, in Canal Sur
- La noche del loco (The night of the crazy)
- El sol, la sal y el son in Canal Sur
- El loco soy yo (I'm crazy) in Canal Sur
- Un loco en América in Telemundo

== Awards ==
- National Communication Media Award (2006)
- Television presenter of the year (2006)
- Golden antenna for his program, El Vagamundo (2003)
- Premio Ondas (2001)
- Award Best interviewer of the Millennium
- Award Andaluz of the 2000 year
- Award King of Spain of journalism (1990)
- Premio Ondas Internacional (1990)
- Medal of Andalucía
- Knight of Argamasilla de Alba
- Award for the most innovative radio done
