= Andalucía Televisión =

- Type: Free-to-air television network
- Country: Spain
- Broadcast area: Andalusia, Ceuta, and Melilla, reaching bordering regions via overspill of their terrestrial networks
- Headquarters: Seville

Ownership
- Owner: Radio y Televisión de Andalucía

History
- Launched: 28 February 2015 (as Andalucía Televisión)
- Former names: Andalucía Televisión

Links
- Website: Canal Sur

Andalucía Televisión, formerly known as Canal Sur HD is the first High Definition TV channel by Radio y Televisión de Andalucía (RTVA). It offers an educational schedule and news which complement the main channel, Canal Sur Televisión.

== Appearance ==
Canal Sur HD started its testing broadcasting on February 26, 2010, on 1080i resolution and only in the province of Seville. Around March 2010, all Andalusia could receive the signal. It was the first TV channel in Spain that produced a real 1080i HD programming in full coverage of an autonomous region of Spain.

On February 28, 2015, RTVA made changes to their television channels. Former Andalucía Televisión changed its name to Canal Sur Andalucía, and Canal Sur HD was renamed to the name Andalucía Televisión. It was then converted in a high definition channel that would show news and instructive and educational programs which had as their main goal to promote the andalusian identity.

== Programming ==
While in testing mode, Canal Sur HD showed movie trailers, small documentary features, and on the regular broadcast, they transmitted self-produced programs in HD by Canal Sur Televisión and Canal Sur 2. Regular broadcast was started on September 30, 2013. By that time, Canal Sur 2 had ceased to exist as an independent channel, and Canal Sur HD consisted on an HD simulcast of Canal Sur Televisión with some independent shows like Andalucía al Día, Tododeporte and La Noche al Día. Since the name change in 2010, the simulcast was ended, and Andalucía Televisión offers a totally independent schedule, remaining programs like the previously mentioned, and other cultural and educational shows that were being shown in Canal Sur Televisión were moved to Andalucía Televisión, for example, Espacio protegido, Con-ciencia, Solidarios, Aldea Global and others.
