= Corporació Valenciana de Mitjans de Comunicació =

- Predecessor: Radiotelevisió Valenciana
- Formation: 20 July 2016; 10 years ago
- Founder: Generalitat Valenciana
- Location(s): Centre de Producció de Programes (CPP) Polígon Accés Ademús s/n, Burjassot, Spain
- Region served: Valencian Community, Spain
- Products: Radio; Television
- Owner: Generalitat Valenciana
- President: Enrique Soriano Hernández
- Governing Board: Enrique Soriano Hernández; Vicent Vergara del Toro; Vicente Cutanda Mansilla; Rafel Xambó Olmos; José Martínez Sáez; María Lozano Estivalis; Raquel Piqueras Navarro; Mar Iglesias García; María Dolores Navarro Giménez
- Budget: 55 million euros (2017)
- Website: www.cvmc.es

Corporació Valenciana de Mitjans de Comunicació (Valencian: [koɾpoɾasiˈo valensiˈana de miˈdʒanz de komunikasiˈo]), also known by its acronym CVMC, is an agency of the Generalitat Valenciana, though with management autonomy and functional independence, in charge of producing and disseminating audiovisual products. Since 20 July 2016 is the successor of Radiotelevisió Valenciana, which was closed in 2013 by the then president Alberto Fabra.

It is part of the Federation of Regional Organizations of Radio and Television (FORTA) with which it shares content for broadcasts.

== Corporate identity ==
=== Logos ===
26 October 2016 – 5 March 2018 (provisional)

5 March 2018 – present

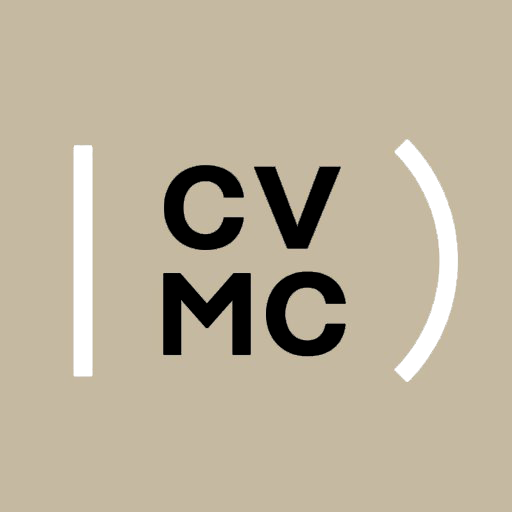
5 March 2018 – present (social networks)

== Activities ==
=== Television ===
==== Channels ====
Logo	Channel	Image format	Broadcasting method	Launch date
	À Punt; General interest programming.	HD	DTT and Internet	10 June 2018; 8 years ago

=== Radio ===
==== Stations ====
Logo	Station	Audio format	Broadcasting method	Launch date
	À Punt Ràdio; General interest programming.	-	FM, DTT and Internet	11 December 2017; 8 years ago

== See also ==
- Radiotelevisió Valenciana
