= Radio Televisión Ceuta =

- Country: Spain
- Broadcast area: Ceuta
- Headquarters: Ceuta

Programming
- Picture format: 1080i HDTV

History
- Launched: 2000

Links
- Website: www.rtvce.es

Availability

Terrestrial
- Digital: Mux 62 (Ceuta)

Radio Televisión Ceuta is a Spanish television channel, launched in 2000. It was founded and started to broadcast in 2000. RTVCE currently broadcasts in Spanish.

In July 2009, Radio Televisión Ceuta and Radio Televisión Andaluza signed an agreement under which RTVCE ceded one of its two DTT channels to the Andalusian public broadcaster, allowing Canal Sur to be viewed in the Autonomous City. The current workforce of RTVCE S.A. consists of nearly forty employees across all operational areas. The broadcaster was established in 2000. Its first Managing Director was Manuel González Bolorino, marking the start of the public broadcaster's operations that same year. Francisco Blanco Nieto served as the second director. He was succeeded in 2002 by Daniel Oliva Martín, the public entity's Director of Programming and Content; in late 2003, Oliva Martín was replaced by Manuel González Bolorino, who took on the role of Managing Director for a second time. In March 2010, Cristina Díaz Moreno—a journalist from within the organization—was appointed Managing Director. Isaac Medina Benasayag was appointed in 2019. In December of that same year, Antonio Gómez Granados was named Managing Director of the Ceuta public broadcaster.

Broadcasting in High Definition (HD) began on November 4, 2020, following the "Second Digital Dividend" spectrum reallocation.

Managing Director: Gonzalo Testa Financial Director: Santiago Cordero del Pozo Technical Director: José Manuel González Navarro Director of Programming and Content: Daniel Oliva Martín News Director: Raul Llamas
