= Televisión Rioja =

Spanish television channel

TVR (Televisión Rioja)
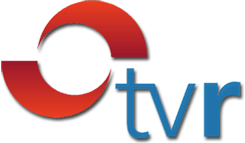
- Country: Spain
- Broadcast area: La Rioja (Spain)
- Headquarters: Logroño

Programming
- Picture format: 1080i HDTV

History
- Launched: 1998
- Former names: La 10 Rioja (May – September 2010); La 10 TVR (September – October 2010)

Links
- Website: www.tvr.es

Availability

Terrestrial
- Digital: Mux 60 (La Rioja)

TVR (Televisión Rioja) is a Spanish television channel, launched in 1998. It was founded and started to broadcast on 1998. Televisión Rioja currently broadcasts in Spanish.

== History ==
The channel was launched in 1998 as Televisión Roja broadcasting on channel 52 in the UHF band, although its broadcasts were only restricted to the Logroño area.

In 2001 the channel obtained a regional license to broadcast in La Rioja through digital terrestrial television, in addition Grupo Vocento became a shareholder, for which Televisión Rioja began its consolidation.

In 2010 Vocento launched La 10, a national channel with general programming, so between May and September Televisión Rioja was renamed La 10 Rioja and later La 10 TVR, broadcasting La 10 programming in simulcast, however, in October 2010 it recovered its name and local programming.

== Programming ==
The channel's programming is general, so it broadcasts news, entertainment programs, sports, television series and coverage of local parties. Because La Rioja does not have a regional public television, the channel is also in charge of broadcasting institutional events of the autonomous government.
