= Televisión del Principado de Asturias =

TPA7, A7
- Country: Spain
- Broadcast area: Asturias
- Headquarters: Gijón

Programming
- Languages: Spanish; Asturian
- Picture format: 1080i HDTV

Ownership
- Owner: RTPA
- Sister channels: TPA8; TPA9 HD

History
- Launched: 20 December 2005; 20 years ago
- Former names: TPA

Links
- Website: www.rtpa.es

Availability

Terrestrial
- TDT: Mux 45 (Asturias)

Streaming media
- rtpa.es: Watch live

Televisión del Principado de Asturias (Asturian: Televisión del Principáu d'Asturies, English: Television of the Principality of Asturias) is the first channel from RTPA, in Asturias. The channel broadcasts entirely in Asturias and its programming is mainly general.

Its headquarters are located in the Universidad Laboral de Gijón.

== History ==
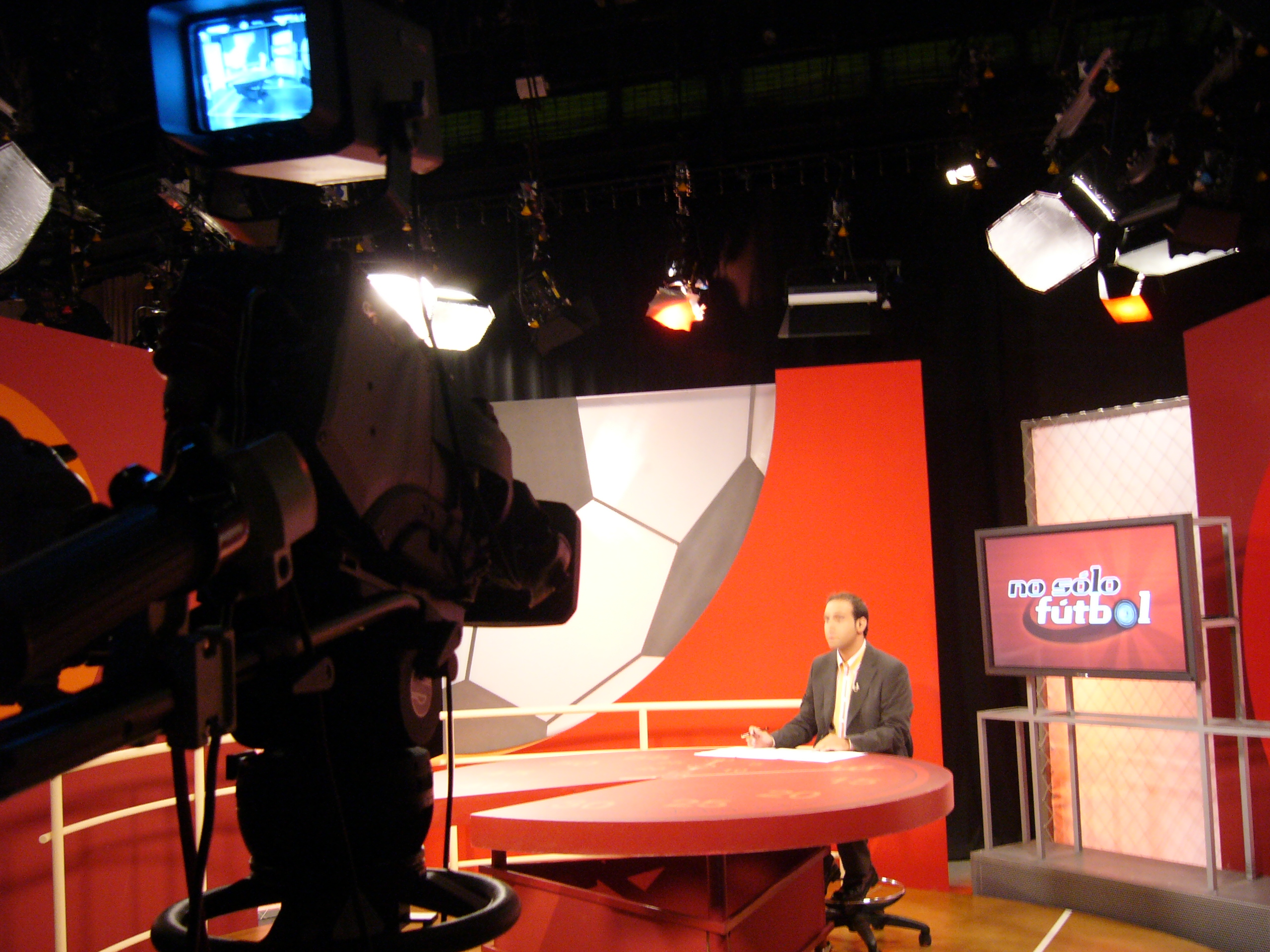
A television studio for sporting program No sólo fútbol.

TPA made its first test broadcast on 20 December 2005 at 21:00. On 7 January 2006, TPA broadcast its first sports coverage with a football match between Sporting de Gijón and Racing de Ferrol, although the match was provided by Televisión de Galicia. The next day, another football game was broadcast, this time at Gozón between Marino de Luanco and Cultural de Durango, but this time produced by themselves. During the first months, all the weekend games of Sporting de Gijón, Marino de Luanco and Real Oviedo were broadcast.

Despite having four programs in Asturian, its programming is mainly in Spanish language.

On 8 September 2006, coinciding with the Day of Asturias, it started its morning broadcastings with the classic Mass of La Santina in Covadonga.

On 27 March 2010, TPA9 HD started its broadcastings with the game of La Liga between Real Zaragoza and Valencia CF. Since that moment, La Liga games and Formula One is presented in this channel.

On 9 June 2011, TPA9 HD, with other autonomous channels, broadcast the concert of Violadores del Verso, being this the first broadcasting on the new Digital Terrestrial Television.

== See also ==
- Radiotelevisión del Principado de Asturias
- Radio del Principado de Asturias
- Televisión del Principado de Asturias 2
