= Televisión del Principado de Asturias 2 =

Spanish television channel

TPA8, A8
- Country: Spain
- Broadcast area: Asturias
- Headquarters: Gijón

Programming
- Languages: Spanish; Asturian
- Picture format: 1080i HDTV

Ownership
- Owner: RTPA
- Sister channels: TPA7; TPA9 HD

History
- Launched: 2 May 2010; 15 years ago
- Former names: TPA-2

Links
- Website: www.rtpa.es

Availability

Terrestrial
- Digital: Mux 45 (Asturias)

Televisión del Principado de Asturias 8 is a Spanish television channel, launched in 2010. TPA8 currently broadcasts in Spanish and Asturian.

Under the nickname of TPA8, it currently broadcasts the programs of TPA with a delay of one hour.
