= Radio del Principado de Asturias =

Regional radio station in Asturias, Spain

Check local listings; Spain
- Broadcast area: Asturias

Programming
- Languages: Spanish, Asturian

Ownership
- Owner: Radiotelevisión del Principado de Asturias

History
- First air date: 2006

Links
- Website: www.rtpa.es

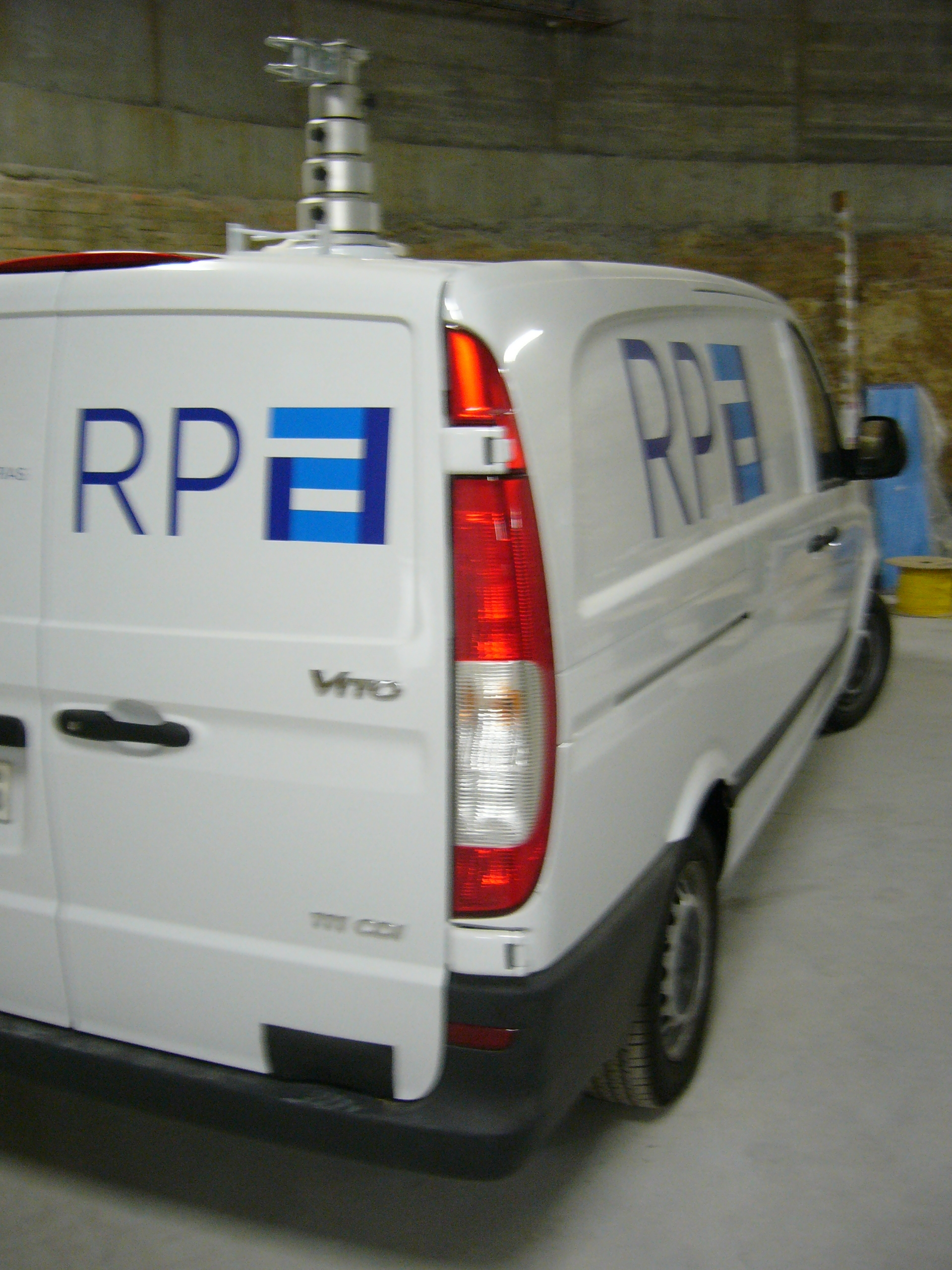
Mobile unit of the RPA

Radio del Principado de Asturias (Asturian: Radio del Principáu d'Asturies) is RTPA's principal radio station broadcasting generalist programs. RPA started broadcasting in 2006, and regularly on 21 December 2007.

== Programs ==
Nowadays RPA broadcasts news at 14:30, news bulletins every hour, and football matches from the main teams of the region.

RPA publishes three different magazines.

== Frequencies ==
RPA broadcasts in FM for all Asturias.

City	Frequency
Gijón/Xixón	100.5 FM
Oviedo/Uviéu	105.4 FM
Avilés and Illas	101.4 FM
Llangréu/Langreo and Mieres	103.2 FM
Llanes	103.8 FM
Valdés	98.6 FM
Cangas del Narcea	89.8 FM
Samartín	100.0 FM
Pola de Laviana/La Pola Llaviana	93.3 FM
Cangues d'Onís/Cangas de Onís	101.7 FM
Boal/Bual	95.4 FM
Quirós	106.4 FM
