= Trece (Spanish TV channel) =

TRECE
- Country: Spain
- Broadcast area: Spain
- Headquarters: Madrid

Programming
- Language: Spanish
- Picture format: 1080i HDTV

Ownership
- Owner: Episcopal Conference of Spain
- Sister channels: Popular TV

History
- Launched: 29 November 2010
- Former names: 13TV (2010–2017)

Links
- Website: http://www.trecetv.es

Availability

Terrestrial
- DVB-T: Check local frequencies

TRECE (formerly called 13TV) is a Spanish free-to-air television channel run by the Episcopal Conference of Spain, belonging to Radio Popular group together with the radio stations COPE, Rock FM, Cadena 100 and MegaStar FM, and the TV network Popular TV.

== History ==
The channel was officially launched as 13TV on November 29, 2010 by renting a television frequency belonging to the group Unidad Editorial. On September 30, 2015, the channel received its own frequency, which began broadcasting officially in 2016.

Since its founding, the channel has shown its alignment with conservatives, something that intensified during the mandate of Antonio María Rouco Varela as the head of the Spanish Episcopal Conference, for which reason it was considered as a means of diffusion of the conservative wing of the People's Party.

In September 2013, a BabyTV branded block launched on the channel, running in weekends.

In 2016 the Spanish Catholic Church commissioned a report on the situation of the channel due to the new social doctrine initiated by Pope Francis; the study showed that the channel needed to undergo reforms because public perception was that the signal was aimed at an elderly audience and sympathizers of the People's Party. The new direction of the Episcopal Conference considered the reform of the channel's content as a necessary step to maintain the finances of 13TV.

In September 2017, the channel underwent an identity change, being renamed as Trece in an attempt to improve the reputation of the signal and make it more appealing to a wider audience, as it had been seen to be very close to right-wing entities. The channel's new programming was based on current affairs, religion and cinema, especially westerns, although some programming from the channel's previous schedule was maintained because they generated good audience numbers. In addition, integration with COPE was increased.

Since 2017, the channel has been looking for a commercial partner to which it can allot part of its programming time to, in exchange for an infusion of capital.

The channel had its best viewing data during the spring and summer of 2020 due to the increase in film and religion programming during the lockdown decreed by the Spanish government to combat COVID-19. In May 2020, Trece was the most-watched channel within the category of channels created for DTT.

== Programming ==
Channel programming is based on three main areas: information, cinema and current affairs about Catholic Church and the Pope. These three fundamentals are transferred to a slate of programming integrated with programs on debate, analysis, news, interviews, documentaries and movies.

== See also ==
- Catholic television
- Catholic television channels
- Catholic television networks
