= Radiotelevisió Valenciana =

Radiotelevisió Valenciana SAU
- Industry: Media
- Founded: 4 July 1984; TBA (relaunch)
- Defunct: 29 November 2013
- Headquarters: Valencia, Spain
- Products: Television, radio
- Divisions: Televisió Valenciana S.A. (TVV), Ràdio Autonomia Valenciana S.A. (RAV)
- Website: www.rtvv.es

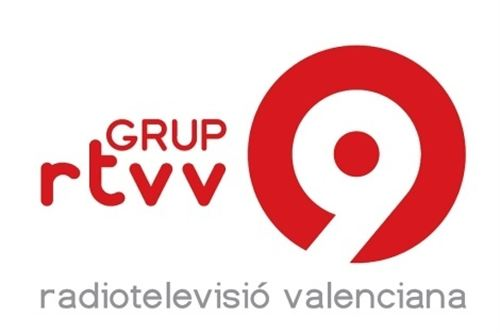
Former logo of the RTVV Group

Radiotelevisió Valenciana (Valencian pronunciation: [ˌraði.oteleviziˈo valensiˈana]) was in charge of the broadcasting of television and radio in the Valencian Community in Spain.

== History ==
The Statute of Autonomy of the Valencian Community of 1982 made possible the creation of means of social communication destined to promote intercommunication between Valencians and to enhance their cultural and linguistic identity.

In July 1984, the Valencian Courts approved the Law for the Creation of Valencian Radio and Television, a necessary instrument to put into practice one of the projects most shared and expected by the various social and political sectors of the Community. Article 11, c) of Law 7/1984 of the Generalitat Valenciana of July 4, by which RTVV is created, establishes the internal regulation through the Regulations developed by the General Directorate, establishing the management of the services of Radio and Television through two public companies in the form of joint-stock companies, Televisió Autonòmica Valenciana SA and Ràdio Autonomia Valenciana S.A. Despite being two different companies, they depend on the same body, this being RTVV. The capital of the company is exclusively contributed by the Valencian Government, in accordance with said law.

On 10 March 1987, the infrastructure works of the RTVV program production center, located in Burjassot, on the outskirts of the city of Valencia, began, as well as facilities.

In March 1988, the RTVV Board of Directors was constituted. The Council was made up of eleven members appointed, according to the Law of Creation of the Entity, by the Valencian Courts, and the duration of their mandate coincides with that of the corresponding legislature.

On 9 October 1989, Canal Nou began broadcasting.

In April of the same year, the Board of Directors proposed to the Council of the Generalitat Valenciana the appointment of the first General Director of the entity.

In 1997, its second channel, Notícies Nou, started broadcasting, being renamed Punt Dos in 1999.

On 1 August 2009, Canal 9 started with a high definition signal called at first Canal Nou HD and later Nou HD, which emitted the same rescaled signal except for the contents produced in high definition that is broadcast in that format.

The entity's budget in 2011 was €120 million, being lowered in 2012 to €98.7 million.

In January 2012, an employment regulation file (ERE) was announced for the RTVV.

In October 2013, the public channel Canal Nou was renamed simply Nou, but the name is short-lived, due to the closure of RTVV. This year's budget is €78 million.

On 29 June 2016, the Tax Agency published a list of debtors where RTVV appears with an amount pending payment of €1.3 million.

== Dissolution ==
In July 2012, in the midst of the ongoing financial crisis, RTVV announced a labor force adjustment plan, firing 1,198 of its 1,660 employees. Trade unions CCOO and CGT challenged the measure, and on 5 November 2013 it was nullified by the National Court. Claiming that reinstating the employees was untenable, the Generalitat Valenciana closed down RTVV that same day. Nou TV's last broadcast ended abruptly when Spanish police pulled the plug at 12:19 on 29 November 2013.

== Televisió Valenciana (TVV) ==
It began test broadcasts on 2 September 1989 under president Joan Lerma, regular broadcasts began on 9 October 1989.

- Nou Televisió – the first channel of TVV; launched as "Canal Nou".
- Canal Nou Dos - the second channel of TVV, broadcast informative, documentary and cultural, as well as sports, programs
- Nou 24 – the third channel of TVV, broadcast news, and information; launched as "24/9", then re-branded as "Canal Nou 24".
- Canal Nou Internacional - the fourth channel of TVV, distributing Valencian programming to the Valencian community around the world, as well as promoting it to the rest of the citizens of those areas

== Ràdio Autonomia Valenciana (RAV) ==
- Nou Ràdio – www.radionou.com
- Nou Sí Ràdio – www.siradio.com
