= Nou (TV channel) =

- Country: Spain
- Broadcast area: Valencian Community
- Headquarters: Burjassot, Horta Nord, Valencian Country

Programming
- Language: Catalan (Valencian)
- Picture format: 1080i HDTV (downscaled to 576i for the SDTV feed)

Ownership
- Owner: Radiotelevisió Valenciana
- Sister channels: Nou Dos; Nou 24

History
- Launched: 9 October 1989; 36 years ago
- Closed: 29 November 2013; 12 years ago
- Replaced by: À Punt
- Former names: Canal 9 (1989-2005); Canal Nou (2005–2013)

Links
- Website: www.nou.es

Nou (Valencian pronunciation: [nɔw], "nine"), previously known as Canal Nou ("channel nine"), was a Valencian free-to-air public broadcast television channel owned and operated by Radiotelevisió Valenciana (RTVV). It was the corporation's flagship channel, featuring general programming mainly in Valencian, with some contents and films in Castilian.

The channel began broadcasting on 9 October 1989 and was closed on 29 November 2013. It was succeeded in 2018 by À Punt.

== Broadcasting ==
Canal Nou could be watched mainly in the Valencian Community. During analogue broadcasting, it reached adjacent areas, especially southern Catalonia, part of Murcia, part of Balearic Islands and the east of Castile–La Mancha. After the digital transition, it was only available in part of Albacete province and Murcia. It was also available in Catalonia following an agreement until July 2010.

== Programming ==
The newscasts were divided into three issues of Notícies Nou and one in the morning, Bon Dia Comunitat Valenciana. It broadcast Valencian fiction series such as Negocis de Família, Les Moreres or L'Alqueria Blanca. It also broadcasts soap operas, mainly of Mexican and Venezuelan production. Other programmes included En connexió, an afternoon news and entertainment programme and football matches of the Valencian First Division teams, as well as the most important sporting events of different Valencian clubs, such as the Pamesa Valencia match of the ULEB Cup. The channel also had the rights to the matches of the Valencian Community football team.

It also had a children's space for children called Babala Club, a container for animated series.

In prime time, it used to broadcast self-produced programs, series, cinema and thematic programs. It also broadcast the space Check-in hotel, a sketch-comedy that had audience shares of up to 30%.

In addition, the channel was very involved with the Valencian festivities, with broadcasts of the Falles de València, as well as broadcasts of the Moors and Christians festivals of the Valencian cities of Ontinyent and Alcoi, the Magdalena Festival, the Fogueres de Sant Joan and the Holy Week.

== Closure ==
In July 2012, in the middle of the then-ongoing financial crisis, RTVV announced a labor force adjustment plan, firing 1,198 of its 1,660 employees. Trade unions CCOO and CGT challenged the measure, and on 5 November 2013 it was nullified by the National Court. Claiming that reinstating the employees was untenable, the Generalitat Valenciana closed down RTVV that same day.

== Logos ==
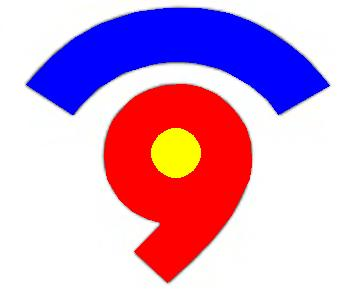
From 9 October 1989 to 2005.

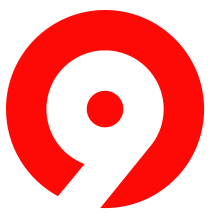
From 2005 to 9 October 2013.

From 9 October to 29 November 2013.
