= Nou 24 =

- Country: Spain
- Headquarters: Burjassot

Ownership
- Owner: Televisió Valenciana
- Sister channels: Nou

History
- Launched: 3 February 2009; 17 years ago
- Closed: 29 November 2013; 12 years ago
- Former names: 24/9 (2009–2010); Canal Nou 24 (2010–2013)

Links
- Website: http://www.rtvv.es/

Availability

Terrestrial
- DTTV: Alicante: 62 UHF; Castellón: 60 UHF; Valencia: 57 UHF

Streaming media
- RTVV: Nou 24

Nou 24 (Valencian pronunciation: [ˈnɔw ˌvintiˈkwatɾe]) was the third channel launched by Ràdio Televisió Valenciana on 3 February 2009, under the name "24/9".

The channel was dedicated to informative programmes made by RTVV and it could be watched only in the Valencian region via digital terrestrial television. Every 30 minutes, on the hour and at half past the hour, there was an informative programme with the most important news of the day. Between these informative programmes there also were other programmes about interviews, videos, docs etc.

All programmes were in Valencian, unlike the sister channel, Canal Nou, which broadcasts in Valencian and Spanish.

The channel launched under the name 24/9. Initially it was broadcast on the RTVV DTT multiplex, but from 30 March 2009, it replaced Punt 2's analog broadcasts, days after adding Punt 2's newscasts on 24/9.

In 2010, the channel was renamed Canal Nou 24 and, in October 2013, as part of a group-wide rebrand, its name was shortened to Nou 24.

It was disbanded along with Canal Nou and the whole of Ràdio Televisió Valenciana just one month later after a labor force adjustment plan that sacked the 75% of the company's personnel was nullified by the National Court, making it untenable.
