= Radio y Televisión de Andalucía =

Public broadcaster in Spain

- Type: Broadcast radio and television
- Country: Spain
- Availability: Andalucía, Ceuta, Melilla, Gibraltar; Also received in some areas of Portugal and Morocco.
- Headquarters: San Juan de Aznalfarache, Seville
- Owner: Junta de Andalucía 5
- Launch date: 1988
- Affiliation: FORTA
- Official website: www.canalsur.es

Radio y Televisión de Andalucía (RTVA) is the public radio and television broadcaster of the Spanish Autonomous Community of Andalusia.

== About RTVA ==
Radio y Television de Andalucia (RTVA) is a provider of radio and TV in the south of Spain. It is a corporate public agency belonging to the Autonomous Government of Andalusia. Its origins go back to 1988 and 1989, when Canal Sur Radio and Canal Sur Televisión started broadcasting.

RTVA began satellite broadcasting in February 1996.

New stations were launched between 1996 and 1998, including Canal 2 Andalucía (now named Canal Sur 2), the second terrestrial television channel; Andalucía Televisión (trademark name of the satellite broadcasting), Radio Andalucía Información, Canal Fiesta Radio and the Fundación Audiovisual de Andalucía.

In December 2021, RTVA began to operate 'CanalSurMás' (a streaming video on demand platform) in testing mode.

== Broadcasting ==
=== Television ===
Logo	Channel	Start transmission	Image Format
	Canal Sur Television; Generalist channel	28 February 1989 (original date); HD: 15 September 2016	High definition
	Canal Sur 2 Generalist channel	5 June 1998	High definition
	Andalucía Televisión; Generalist channel	28 February 2015	High definition
	Canal Sur 4K (Test service in Seville)	28 April 2017	4K

The international channel of Canal Sur Television is available through the Internet and various satellites and payment platforms in Spain, Europe, Americas, Africa, Asia and Oceania.

Logo	Channel	Start transmissions	Image Format
	Canal Sur Andalucía; Generalist channel.	28 February 1996	Standard definition Also available in high definition.

=== Radio ===
- Canal Sur Radio (October 1988)
- Radio Andalucía (September 1998)
- Canal Fiesta Radio (January 2001)
- Flamenco Radio (September 2008)
