= Canal Nou Dos =

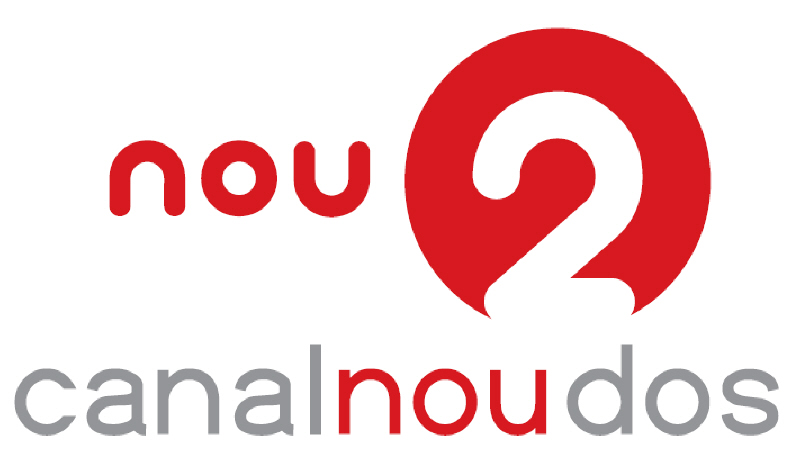
- Country: Spain
- Headquarters: Burjassot

Programming
- Language: Valencian

Ownership
- Owner: Televisió Valenciana
- Sister channels: Canal Nou, Canal Nou 24

History
- Launched: 9 October 1997; 29 years ago
- Closed: 5 July 2013; 13 years ago
- Former names: Notícies 9 (1997-1999); Punt Dos (1999-2010)

Links
- Website: www.punt2.es

Availability

Terrestrial
- DTT: Alacant: 62 UHF; Castelló: 60 UHF; València: 57 UHF

Canal Nou Dos (Valencian pronunciation: [kaˈnal ˈnɔw ˈðos]) was the second channel launched by Radiotelevisió Valenciana on 9 October 1997.

The channel was launched under the name Notícies 9, a channel dedicated to informative programmes made by RTVV. It changed its name to Punt 2 after it began to show informative, documentary and cultural, as well as sport programmes during the weekend. All programmes are in Valencian, unlike sister channel Canal Nou, which broadcasts in both Valencian and Spanish. In 2010 the channel was re-branded under its last name, Canal Nou Dos.

== History ==
The channel officially started on 9 October 1997, under the name Notícies 9, a channel dedicated to news and current affairs programs produced by RTVV. However, its test broadcasts started earlier that year, on 16 February 1997, causing interferences to TV3's signals in some Valencian municipalities during the implementation period of the second channel. By changing its name to Punt 2 on 1 May 1999, it started a new phase, with news, documentaries and cultural programming, as well as sports programming on weekends.

Its programming was entirely in Valencian, unlike Canal Nou, which toggled between Castilian and Valencian. The channel aired cultural programming centered on Valencia, such as Cor de festa Bandàlia, among others. Also, a large part of Nou 2's programming focused on children during the Babalà club programming block. The chanenl also aired matches of the Valencian teams of the Second Division of the Spanish Football League and, on Sundays, those of the 2ª B and the Liga ACB basketball league.

Former Punt 2 logo, used 2005 – 2010

On 30 March 2009, Punt Dos gave its analog frequencies to Nou 24, and started broadcasting exclusively on DTT, on RTVV's mux with 96% coverage in Valencia.

Due to the financial crisis that was facing Spain, RTVV0s directorates announced that Nou 2 and Nou 24 would be merged under one channel, Nou 2, from 6 July 2013, and was to be centered exclusively on news, culture and repeats. The merger of both channels was approved on 5 July 2013 by the Consell, which caused annual savings worth €2,7 million.

On the other hand, in an announcement, RTVV's union sectors announced that they had accepted the proposal of RTVV's direction to delay the period of the eighth collective convening until 1 November of the same year. In the note, the indicated that negotiations for such collective convening would start on 1 September.
