= Radiotelevisión del Principado de Asturias =

Spanish public broadcasting company

- Industry: Media
- Founded: 2005
- Headquarters: Gijón, Asturias, Spain
- Key people: Francisco González Orejas (Director)
- Products: Television, Radio
- Divisions: Televisión del Principado de Asturias; Radio del Principado de Asturias
- Website: http://www.rtpa.es/

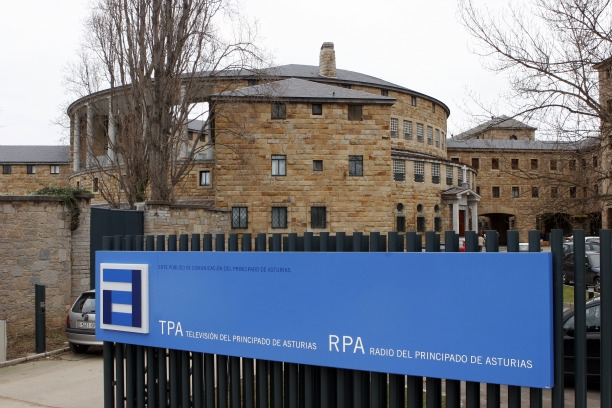
Headquarters of the RTPA in the Laboral University, in Gijón.

Radiotelevisión del Principado de Asturias (RTPA; Asturian: Radiotelevisión del Principáu d'Asturies) is the public broadcaster of Asturias, created in 2005. Since 2019, its general director is Francisco González.

== Services ==
The broadcaster manages several television channels and radio stations:

== History ==
Televisión del Principado de Asturias made its first test broadcast on 20 December 2005 at 21:00. On 7 January 2006, TPA broadcast its first sports coverage with a football match between Sporting de Gijón and Racing de Ferrol, although the match was provided by Televisión de Galicia. The next day, another football game was broadcast, this time at Gozón between Marino de Luanco and Cultural de Durango, but this time produced by themselves. During the first months, all the weekend games of Sporting de Gijón, Marino de Luanco and Real Oviedo were broadcast.

On 6 June 2006, TPA started regular broadcasts with news broadcasting. On September that year, RTPA started radio service tests and broadcasts via satellite through Hispasat.

The Radio del Principado de Asturias started regular broadcastings on 21 December 2007.

== Divisions ==
- Televisión del Principado de Asturias
- Televisión del Principado de Asturias 2
- Radio del Principado de Asturias

Media channels operated by RTPA
Service	Type	Launch date	Programming type
TPA7	Television (Ch. 7)	2006	Generalist, main channel
TPA8	Television (Ch. 8)	2010	Generalist, time-shift and regional
RPA	Radio	2006	Generalist news and music
