= La 7 (Region of Murcia) =

Spanish TV channel

- Country: Spain
- Broadcast area: Murcia

Programming
- Language: Spanish
- Picture format: 1080i HDTV

Ownership
- Owner: Televisión Autonómica de Murcia, S.A.

History
- Launched: 20 September 2006

Links
- Website: www.la7tv.es

Availability

Terrestrial
- Digital: Channel 29 (SD and HD)

La 7 (La Siete) is an autonomous television channel for the Region of Murcia, Spain. It is owned by Televisión Autonómica de Murcia, S.A. (TAM, S.A.)

Test transmissions began on 14 April 2006, with the main launch on 20 September 2006.

== History ==
The origins of regional television in Murcia go back to 1990, when between January 21 and 28 of that year, Tele 3 was broadcast, a channel that was tested for a week. Subsequently the test broadcast ceased and the project was abandoned.

From the Tele 3 project, 13 years passed before the Murcia regional television project was resumed. On April 14, 2006, the test broadcasts of the new channel that was called 7RM began, finally the channel began to broadcast fully on October 23. In 2009 the HD version of the channel was launched.

In September 2012, due to the financial situation of the channel, the Murcia government decided to privatize its management. After the privatization of the channel, the programming was based on movies, series and canned content, keeping only the newscasts as live programs, although made by an external company. In June 2015, the management of the channel passed to Grupo Secuoya, which has held this position since then.

== Programming ==
La 7's programming is focused on the Region of Murcia, which is why its schedule is made up of news programs, entertainment magazines, contests, and outreach content on the life and culture of the peoples of the region. In addition, the channel also broadcasts some sporting events in which local teams are involved.

== Logos ==
- SDTV version:
From 14 April 2006 to 31 May 2015.

Since 1 June 2015 to June 2022.

Since June 2022 to September 2022.

Since September 2022.
- HDTV version:
From 2009 to 31 May 2015.

Since 1 June 2015.
