= Canal Sur 2 =

Public television channel of Andalucía, Spain

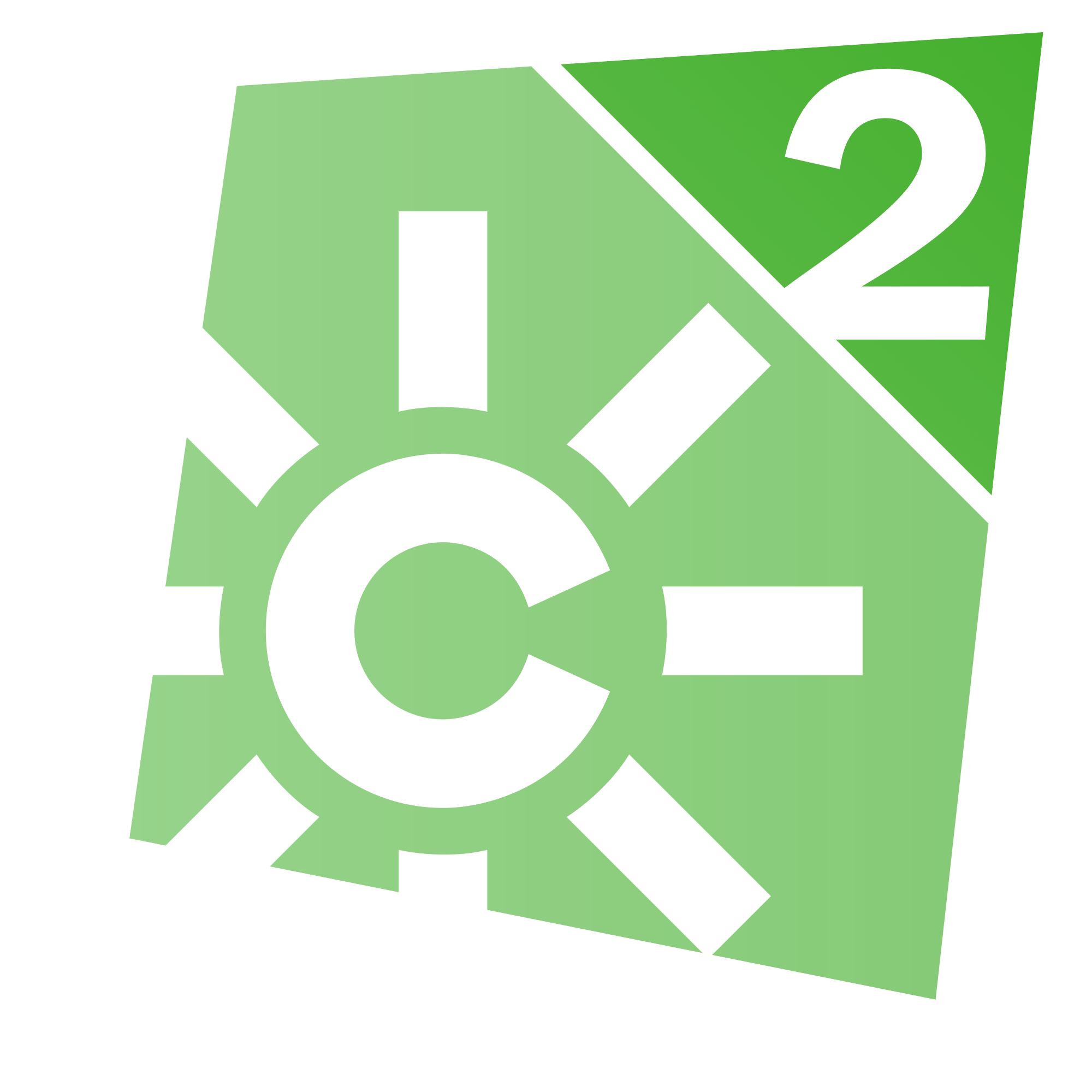
- Country: Spain
- Broadcast area: Andalusia, Ceuta, and Melilla, reaching bordering regions via overspill of their terrestrial networks

Ownership
- Owner: Radio y Televisión de Andalucía
- Sister channels: Canal Sur

History
- Launched: 5 June 1998; 28 years ago
- Former names: Canal 2 Andalucía (1998–2008)

Links
- Website: Official site

Canal Sur 2 is the second public television channel from Radio y Televisión de Andalucía (RTVA). It began broadcasting on 5 June 1998, under the name Canal 2 Andalucía.

With the launch of Canal 2 Andalucía, RTVA had to split its television broadcasts to two channels, leaving Canal Sur as a general entertainment and news channel, while Canal 2 Andalucía focuses on cultural, informative, sport and children's programmes.

== History ==
Its broadcasts started at 5pm on 5 June 1998, the centennial of Federico García Lorca's birth, with several documentaries about his life and a musical special broadcast from Fuente Vaqueros, where he was born. The channel aimed to capture an audience of 3.3 million Andalusians of the middle and high classes.

On 5 June 2008, coinciding with the tenth anniversary of the channel, the channel was given a new look and renamed Canal Sur 2.

From October 2012, the channel ceased broadcasting original material and instead simulcast Canal Sur.

== Logos ==
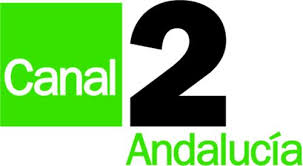
1998-2008

2008-2011

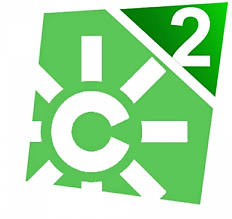
2011-2012; 2018–present

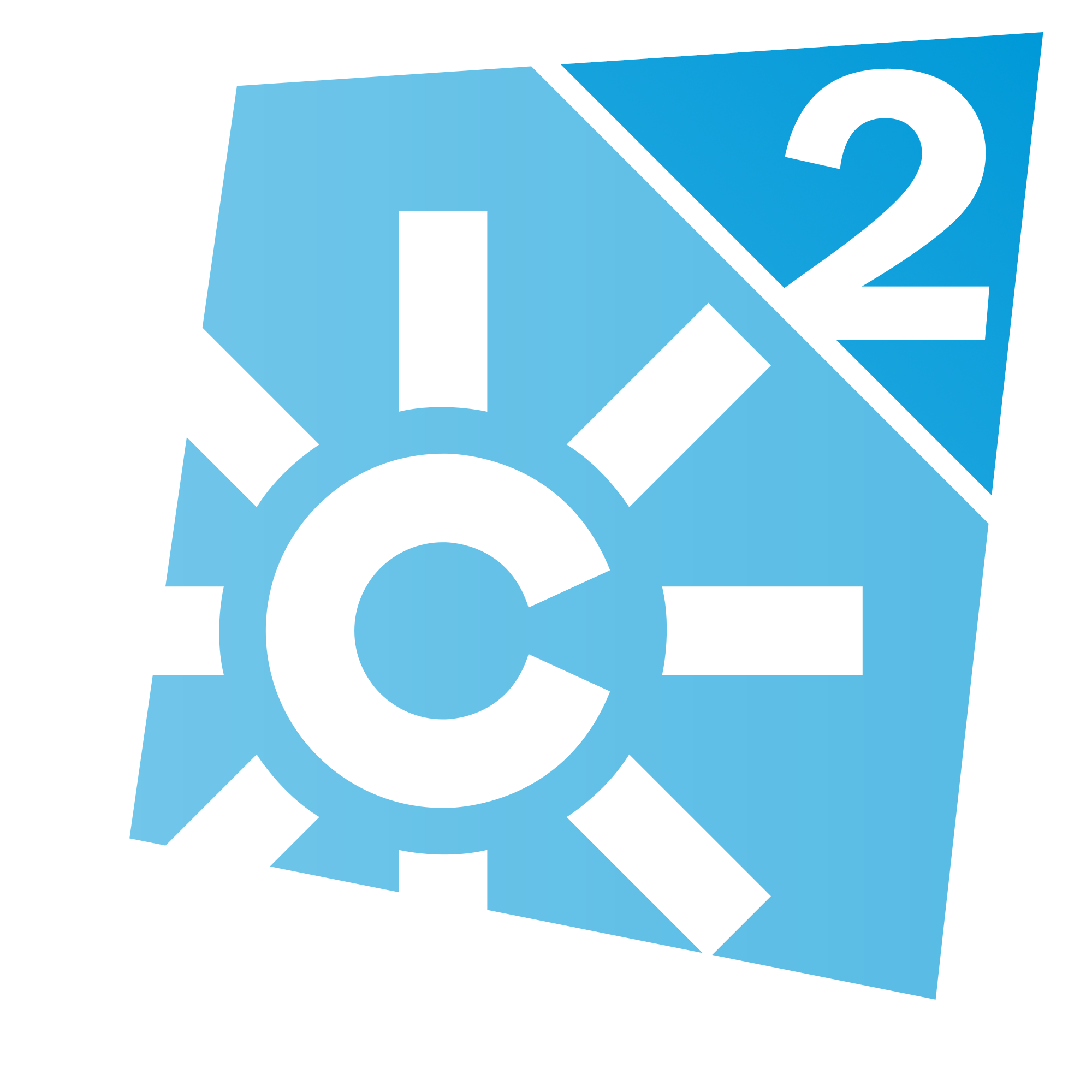
2012 - 2018
