= Canal Sur =

Andalusian TV network

Canal Sur Televisión
- Type: Free-to-air television channel
- Country: Spain
- Broadcast area: Andalusia, Ceuta, and Melilla, reaching bordering regions via overspill of their terrestrial networks
- Headquarters: Seville

Ownership
- Owner: Radio y Televisión de Andalucía

History
- Launched: 28 February 1989; 37 years ago

Links
- Website: Canal Sur

Canal Sur ('South Channel') is part of Radio y Televisión de Andalucía (RTVA), the public broadcasting company of Andalusia. It was created by means of the devolved powers given to this autononomous community by an Act of Parliament in its statute of autonomy.

Canal Sur currently consists of two signals, Canal Sur 1 and Canal Sur 2. They broadcast the same programming, but sign language translation and burned-in subtitles are added on Canal Sur 2.

== History ==
On 28 February 1989 Canal Sur 1 TV was launched as the public broadcaster of the Autonomous Community of Andalucía. This means that it was funded by the regional government of Andalusia. Becoming the fourth Spanish autonomous community to have its own public TV channel after Basque Country, Catalonia and Galicia. In its origins, Canal Sur broadcast programming of all kinds, including news, entertainment, cultural, sports and children's content.

Canal Sur was launched with the aim of disseminating Andalusian culture, politics and values among its population and to have an alternative to the monopoly that TVE held at that time.

Between 1988 and 1990 there was a campaign to promote the broadcast of Canal Sur in Catalonia due to the large amount of Andalusian population present in that community, as part of the project legislation was sought so that all Spanish regional television could be tuned in throughout the national territory, however, finally the proposal was undone.

Canal 2 Andalucía, later Canal Sur 2, was founded in 1998. This new channel began to broadcast cultural, children's and sports programming, so Canal Sur became a channel dedicated mainly to information and entertainment programs. On 1 October 2012 Canal Sur 2 was closed, so the programming of both channels was merged. After this date, the same programming was broadcast on the second channel as on Canal Sur, but adapted to the disabled audience, so subtitles, audio description and sign language services were added.

In February 2010, Canal Sur HD broadcast tests began, beginning its regular broadcasts on 30 September 2013. The HD version of Canal Sur was closed on 28 February 2015 to make way for Andalucía Televisión, a complementary channel intended for to fill the vacancy left by the closure of Canal Sur 2. On 16 September 2016 the HD signal was recovered using a different channel. In 2017, Canal Sur 4K broadcasts began, but limited to Seville and its neighboring area.

Canal Sur faced an important change in 2019, when the PSOE was evicted from the Government of Andalusia by a government coalition between the PP and Ciudadanos, which led to changes in the channel's administration and editorial line.

== Programming ==
Canal Sur's programming is based on broadcasting news and entertainment. In the first case, the informative programs and some debates stand out. While entertainment stands out for the dissemination of magazine programs, contests, musicals, cooking programs and dissemination of Andalusian culture. The programming is also complemented with movies and series.

== Critics ==
The Spanish Socialist Workers' Party (PSOE) was in power in the region between Spain regained democracy and 2019. As they controlled the Andalusian Autonomous Government (Junta de Andalucía) many people have accused the regional government of transforming the channel into the mouthpiece of their party.

Canal Sur's news broadcasts often expressed views critical of Mariano Rajoy (who was Prime Minister of Spain from 2011 to 2018), and his party, the People's Party (PP).

After the change of government from the PSOE to one between the People's Party (PP) and Citizens (C's), Canal Sur was accused of disseminating biased information to benefit the PP, in addition to placing journalists with ideologies related to the ruling parties, the channel was accused of hiding information that was detrimental to the interests of the PP, including legal convictions against the party.
