= Antena 3 Radio =

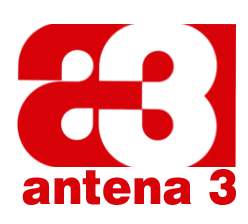
- Spain
- Broadcast area: Spain

Programming
- Language: Spanish

Ownership
- Operator: Grupo Antena 3 (1982–1992); Unión Radio (1993–1994)

History
- First air date: 1 February 1982
- Last air date: 17 June 1994

Antena 3 Radio was a nationwide Spanish radio station opened on 1 February 1982 and closed on 19 June 1994. It served as the basis for the creation of Antena 3 Televisión.

== Foundation ==
Antena 3 was created on 1 February 1982 by La Vanguardia (51%) and ABC (13%), Manuel Martín Ferrand (5%), Europa Press and Grupo Zeta. The CEO was Manuel Martín Ferrand, and its president was Rafael Jiménez de Parga, later succeeded by Javier Godó (from La Vanguardia). The general director was Javier Jimeno, the Head of Programs was José Luis Orosa, and José Cavero was head of news.

== Goals ==
The main goal of Antena 3 was to create a private television channel. That request was rejected in 1982, but then approved in 1989, when Antena 3 Televisión was created, joining both companies of radio and television.

== History ==
=== Beginnings and consolidation ===
Antena 3 started broadcast nationwide on 4 May 1982. In 1984, they acquired Promotora de Televisión y Radio S.A. and its music station Radio 80, which became Radio 8 Serie Oro. On 1991, through Onda Musical S.A. they released another music station, Radiolé. In 1989, they became the first Spanish media company on the stock exchange. On 1992, they went to number 1 on the EGM (3.139.000 listeners, beating Cadena SER with 3.007.000 listeners).

=== Arrival of PRISA and dismantling ===
On 22 July 1992 Prisa, owner of Cadena SER, bought 49% of Inversiones Godó and 51% of Patrielva, and therefore controlled 25% of Antena 3 Radio. At the end of 1992, fulfilling the Television Law, Antena 3 Radio sold their part of Antena 3 Television (12,49%), and therefore, the radio and television companies became independent from each other.

On 1993, PRISA launched an IPO to acquire the share of stock. At the end of 1993, after some business movements, Prisa owned 80% of Antena 3 Radio through the constitution of "Unión Radio". Eight journalists from Antena 3 (Antonio Herrero, Manuel Martín Ferrand, Melchor Miralles, Pedro J. Ramírez, Luis Ángel de la Viuda, Federico Jiménez Losantos, José María García and Luis Herrero) would denounce this operation. The newspaper El País would criticize this denounce.

Meanwhile, in January 1993, Radio 80 (owned by Antena 3) merged with Radio Minuto (owned by Prisa), creating M80 Radio. In May 1994, against the opinion of the Court of Competition, the cabinet council authorized the operation and creation of Unión Radio.

=== End of transmission ===
Therefore, on 19 June 1994, Antena 3 ceased its broadcast as a generalist station, and became "Sinfo Radio Antena 3", which would be dedicated to classic music. In 2000, the Supreme Court outlawed the 1994 operation, but the sentence never was executed. Finally, on 29 March 2002, Sinfo Radio Antena 3 ceased its transmissions and was substituted by Máxima FM, dedicated to dance music.

== Former stations and frequencies ==
- A Coruña: 92.6 FM (now Radio Voz)
- Albacete: 98.3 FM (now Cadena Dial)
- Alcalá de Henares: 103.1 FM (now Cadena SER)
- Alicante: 91.6 FM (now Cadena SER 91.7 FM)
- Ávila: 94.2 FM (now Cadena SER)
- Almería: 87.9 FM
- Arcos de la Frontera: 88.5 (now Cadena Dial)
- Ayamonte: 93.1 FM (now Cadena SER)
- Badajoz: 93.5 FM (now Cadena Dial)
- Barcelona: 104.2 FM (now Máxima FM)
- Baza: 89.2 FM (now Cadena SER)
- Bilbao: 103.7 FM (now Punto Radio)
- Burgos: 94.3 FM (now Cadena Dial)
- Cádiz: 93.2 FM (now M80 Radio)
- Caravaca de la Cruz: 97.2 FM (now Cadena SER)
- Cartagena("Litoral"): 95.4 FM (now Cadena Dial)
- Castellón: 91.2 FM (now Cadena SER)
- Castro Urdiales: 90.3 FM (now Cadena SER)
- Cieza: 88.0 FM (now Cadena SER)
- Ciudad Real 96.2 FM (now Cadena Dial)
- Córdoba: 88.3 FM (now Cadena Dial 88.4 FM)
- Costa del Sol 93.3 FM (now Cadena SER)
- Don Benito: 98.4 FM (now los 40 Principales)
- Elche : 101.4 FM (now Radio Expres Elche)
- Gandia: 104.3 FM (now Cadena SER)
- Haro: 100.7 FM (now Cadena SER)
- Las Palmas: 103.0 FM (now Radio Canarias)
- León: 94.3 FM (now Cadena Dial)
- Madrid: 104.3 FM (now Máxima FM)
- Mallorca: 103.2 FM (now Cadena SER)
- Medina del Campo: 89.2 FM (now Cadena SER)
- Menorca: 98.2 FM (now Cadena Dial)
- Mérida: 100.0 FM
- Mojacar: 91.8 FM (now Cadena SER)
- Monòver: 102.4 (now Radio Ciudad)
- Murcia: 100.3 FM (now Cadena SER)
- Oviedo: 91.1 FM (now Cadena Dial)
- Palencia: 94.7 FM (now Los 40 Principales)
- Parla ("Madrid Sur"): 94.4 FM (now Cadena SER)
- Pontevedra: 93.1 FM (now Radio Voz)
- Reus: 95.3 FM (now Onda Cero)
- Ronda: 88.9 FM (now Cadena Dial)
- San Sebastián: 106.2 (now Punto Radio)
- Santander: 101.1 FM (now M80 Radio)
- Segovia: 94.8 FM (now Cadena Dial)
- Sevilla: 101.5 FM (now Radiolé)
- Soria: 97.7 FM (now Los 40 Principales)
- Tarragona: 96.2 FM (now M80 Radio, 96.1 FM)
- Tenerife: 91.1 FM (now Máxima FM)
- Toledo: 94,2 FM (now los 40 principales)
- Tortosa: 101.9 FM (now Radio Marca)
- Tudela 90.4 FM (now Cadena SER)
- Valencia: 100.4 FM (now Cadena SER)
- Valladolid: 100.4 FM (now Cadena Dial)
- Vilafranca del Penedès: 92.6 FM (now Cadena SER, later 103.1 FM SER PENEDÈS-GARRAF)
- Vitoria-Gasteiz: 105.6 FM (now Punto Radio)
- Xàtiva: 94.6 FM (now Cadena SER)
- Zamora: 103.1 FM (now Cadena SER)
- Zaragoza: 92.0 FM (now Máxima FM)

== People who worked on Antena 3 Radio ==
- Antonio Herrero
- José María García
- Gaspar Rosety
- Fernando Soria
- Eduardo Torrico
- Ernesto López Feito
- Andrés Montes
- Paco Galindo
- Manuel Martín Ferrand
- Javier Godó
- Luis Herrero
- Federico Jiménez Losantos
- Miguel Ángel García Juez
- José Antonio Plaza
- Miguel Ángel Nieto González
- Isabel González del Vado
- Rafael Jiménez de Parga
- Santiago Amón
- Luis Ángel de la Viuda
- Víctor Márquez Reviriego
- Carlos de Prada
- Luis Vicente Muñoz
- José Luis Balbín
- Carlos Pumares
- José Ramón Pardo
- José Cavero
- Nieves Herrero
- Rosa Villacastín
- Mayra Gómez Kemp
- Juan Luis Cano
- Guillermo Fesser
- Bartolomé Beltrán
- Ana Rosa Quintana
- Luis Carandell
- Luis Fraga Pombo
- Alfonso Arús
- Miguel Martínez Fernández
- Tino Pertierra
- Consuelo Berlanga
- Moncho Alpuente
- Julián Lago
- Carlos García Hirschfeld
- Javier Cárdenas
- Ramiro Calle
- Jesús María Amilibia
- Carmen Pérez Novo
- Lydia Lozano
- Consuelo Sánchez-Vicente
- Javier Monjas
- Belén G. del Pino
- Jesús Ortiz Álvarez (Father of Letizia, Princess of Asturias)
- José Luis Garci
- Carmela Castelló
- Javier Jimeno
- Joaquín Hurtado
- Emiliano Aláiz
- José Luis Orosa
- Salomón Hachuel
- Hilario Pino
- Javier González Ferrari
- Carlos Alsina
- Carlos Carnicero
- Consuelo Álvarez de Toledo
- José Luis Pécker
- Nacho Dogan
- Paco Fuentes
- Fernando González Urbaneja
- Víctor Padrón
- Mon Santiso
- Esmeralda Velasco
- Liborio García
- Concha García Campoy
- José María Carrascal
- Justo Braga Suárez
- Alipio Gutiérrez
- Silvia Salgado Garrido
- Alfonso Ortuño
- Pepe Navarro
- Andrés Caparrós Martínez
- Teresa Viejo
- Justo Fernández
- Paco Costas
- Juana Ginzo
- Josemi Rodríguez-Sieiro
- José Manuel Estrada
- Ernesto Sáenz de Buruaga
- Gerardo Lombardero
- Fernando Olmeda
- Eduardo Inda
- Arantza Martín
- Manuel Marlasca
- Rafael Benedito
- Eduardo Alcalde Clemente
- Salvador Valero
- Benito Castro Galiana
- Jesús Saiz Olmo
- Cristina Aguirre
- Rafael Cerro
- Julián Nieto
