= Eduardo Inda =

Spanish journalist (born 1967)

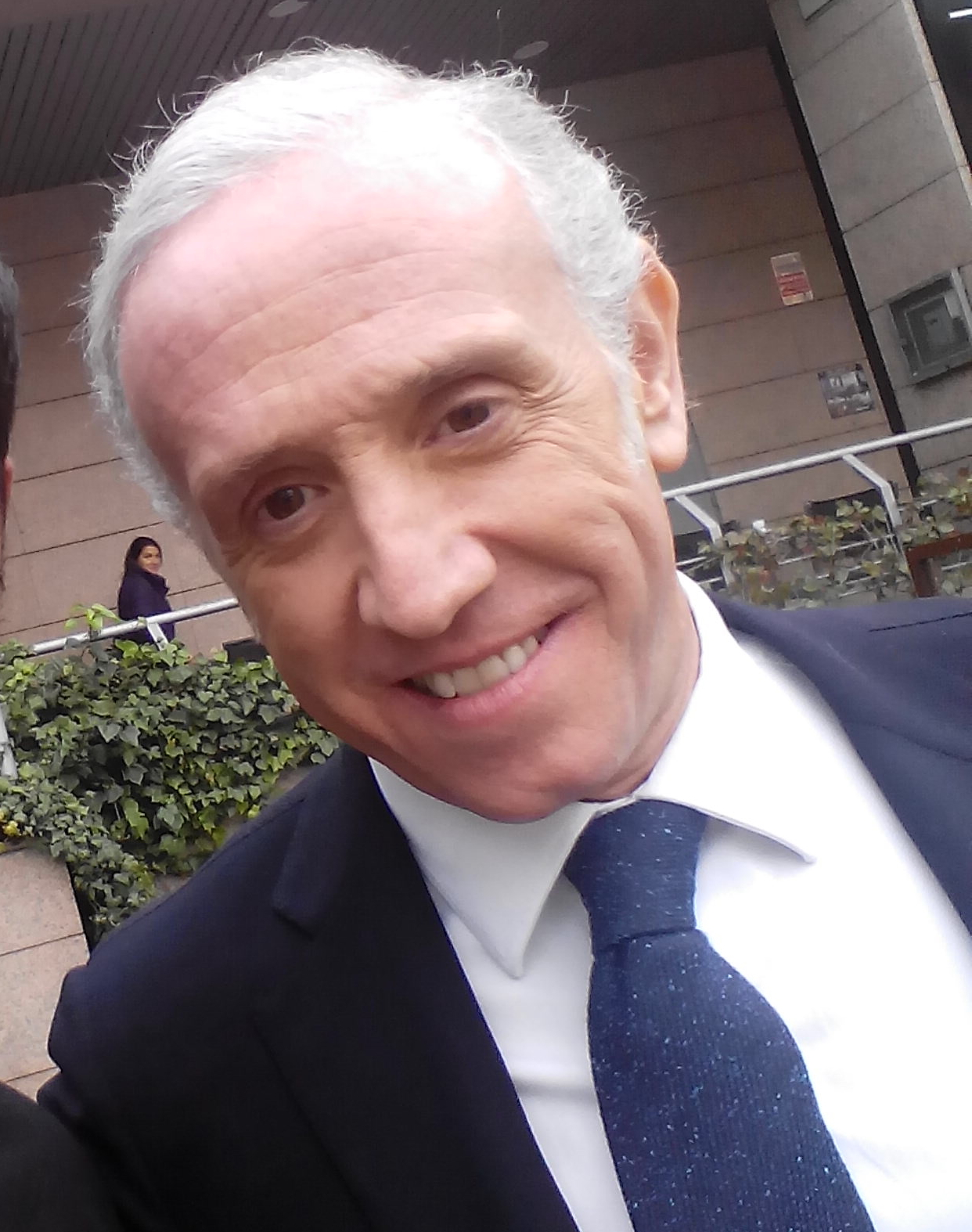
- Born: Eduardo Inda Arriaga; 15 July 1967 (age 59); Pamplona, Spain
- Occupation: Journalist
- Employers: Antena 3 Radio; ABC; El Mundo; (1994–2007); Marca; (2007–2011); El Mundo; (2011–2014); Okdiario; (2015–present); La Sexta; Mega

Eduardo Inda Arriaga (15 July 1967) is a Spanish journalist and talk show host. From 2002 to 2007, he was director of the newspaper El Mundo in the Balearic Islands, and from July 2007 to March 2011, he was director of the sports newspaper Marca, returning later to the direction of El Mundo. He is currently director of Okdiario, founded by him, in addition to participating in various radio and television talk shows, such as El chiringuito de Jugones, Es la mañana de Federico, El programa de Ana Rosa, La Sexta Noche, or Al Rojo vivo.

== Biography ==
=== Early life and career ===
Eduardo Inda was born in Pamplona has a degree in Information Sciences from the University of Navarra. He began his work at Antena 3 Radio. From there, he moved to ABCnewspaper, first as a sports correspondent in Navarra, and then to the newspaper's central newsroom. In 1994, he joined the editorial staff of the newspaper El Mundo in Madrid, first covering local news, and then national news as a correspondent at the Palacio de la Moncloa.

=== Director of El Mundo in the Balearic Islands (2002–2007) ===
In 2002, he was appointed editor of the Balearic Islands edition of El Mundo. During this period, some media have criticized the newspaper's links with the Partido Popular of the Balearic Islands for the benefit of its president, Jaume Matas, trying to influence his election as president of the Balearic Government, which finally took place in 2003.

=== Director of Marca (2007–2011) ===
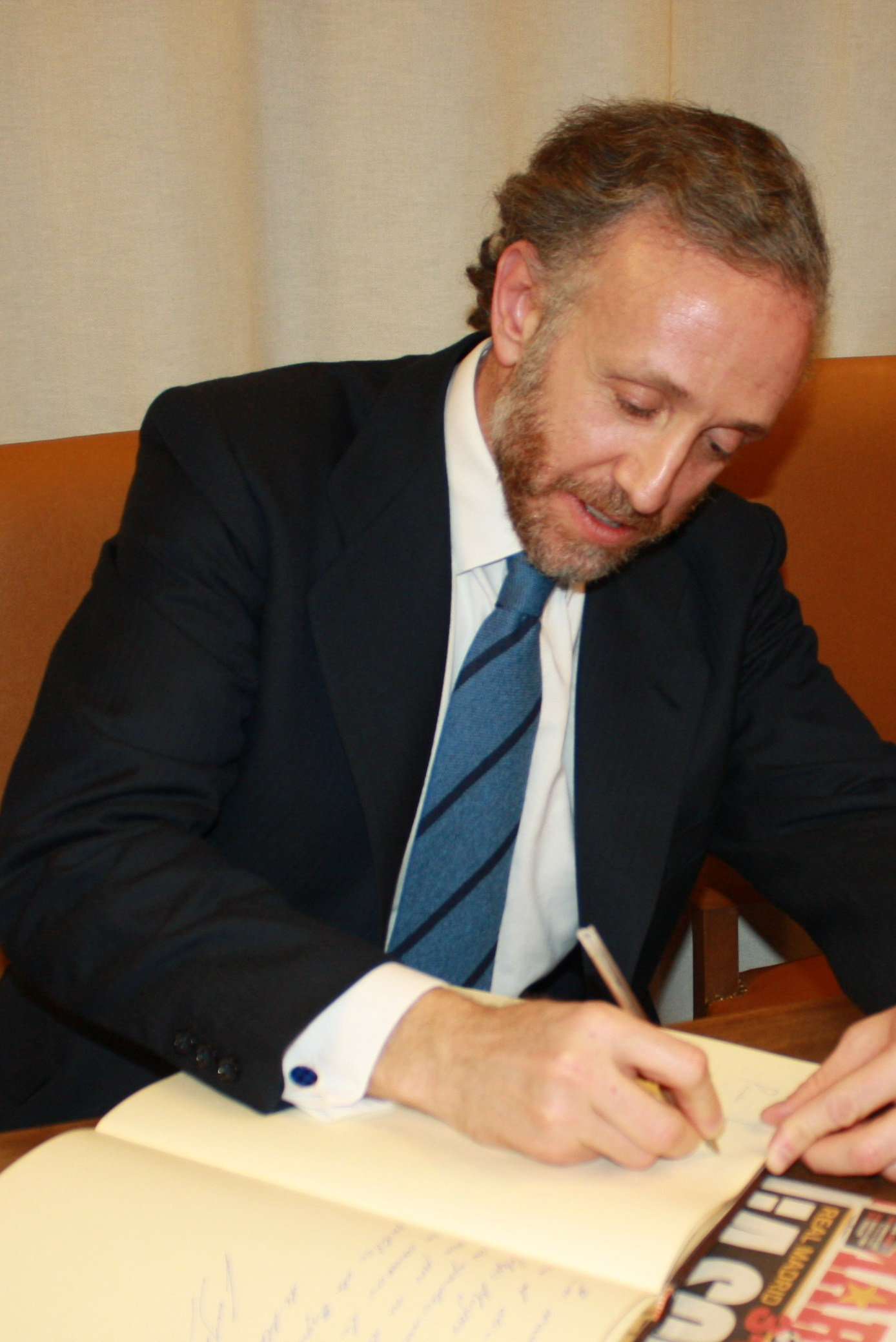
Eduardo Inda, at a conference at the Colegio Mayor Elías Ahúja in Madrid in 2011.

In 2007, following the purchase of Grupo Recoletos by Unidad Editorial, owner of El Mundo, he was appointed editor of the sports newspaper Marca, replacing Alejandro Sopeña. Inda's arrival at Marca meant a change in the editorial line of the newspaper, which meant the disagreement of an important part of the editors of the newspaper, such as its deputy director, Santiago Segurola. According to some sources, it was Pedro J. Ramírez himself who prevented Inda from firing Segurola because of these disagreements. Inda himself published a weekly column entitled "Los puntos sobre las es", formally very similar to the articles that his mentor, Pedro J. Ramírez, published every Sunday in El Mundo.

Critics of this marked editorial line accused it of sensationalism and "yellow journalism," which even gave rise to web pages whose sole purpose was to evaluate the newspaper's contents. In January 2009, the newspaper Marca uncovered irregularities in Real Madrid's last general assembly of members and accused the then president, Ramón Calderón, of "stealing the assembly" on its front page. Calderón resigned a few days later, but his disagreements with the newspaper did not stop there. In March 2010, he publicly declared that "the newspaper Marca is run by a psychopath," a clear reference to Inda.

Another of the alleged targets of the newspaper under the direction of Inda was Real Madrid coach Manuel Pellegrini. Marca was attributed to a campaign against Pellegrini, to force his departure from the team. This alleged campaign included headlines such as "Goodbye, Champions. Goodbye, Pellegrini! ", after Real Madrid's elimination from the 2009–10 UEFA Champions League against Olympique de Lyon, and others suggesting possible replacements for the Chilean coach. Following Pellegrini's dismissal at the end of the season, Chile's leading newspaper, El Mercurio, directly accused Marca of organizing the campaign that cost the coach his job. The front page announcing that Pellegrini would not continue at Real Madrid was marked with the headline: "You're fired, Manolo."

In November 2010, Libertad Digital reported that a Facebook group calling for Inda's resignation as editor of the newspaper had more than 30,000 internet users. Nevertheless, Marca remained the leader in sales of national print sports newspapers under his leadership, with 284,273 copies sold on average in 2009. During his time at the helm, Eduardo Inda was also a sporadic commentator for the television channel La Sexta, and a talk show host on Radio Marca's Directo Marca program. After four years at the helm of Marca, on March 19, 2011, Unidad Editorial appointed him as the new general manager of Veo7, the group's television channel, replacing Ernesto Sáenz de Buruaga, a position he was to occupy in the weeks following the announcement. Some media interpreted that his imminent departure from Marca would have been due to his controversial activities at the head of the newspaper.

=== Return to El Mundo (2011–2014) ===
After his return as a reporter at El Mundo, he was charged, together with Esteban Urreiztieta, in November 2012 by a Barcelonacourt, for the crimes of libel and slander, after his newspaper was denounced by Artur Mas, a complaint that was finally dismissed in October 2013 Mas had been accused in El Mundo of diverting funds to current accounts abroad. Since 2013 he has been a regular contributor to the television program La Sexta Noche. In December 2014, he left the staff of El Mundo.

=== Founder of OkDiario.com (2015–present) ===
After leaving El Mundo, he founded the new digital newspaper Okdiario.com. This newspaper has been accused by other media of manipulating the news to create controversy. According to a study by the University of Valencia, in November 2017, it was the worst-rated media outlet in Spain, although it is one of the most widely read.
