= Lucía Casanueva =

Spanish journalist and communications entrepreneur

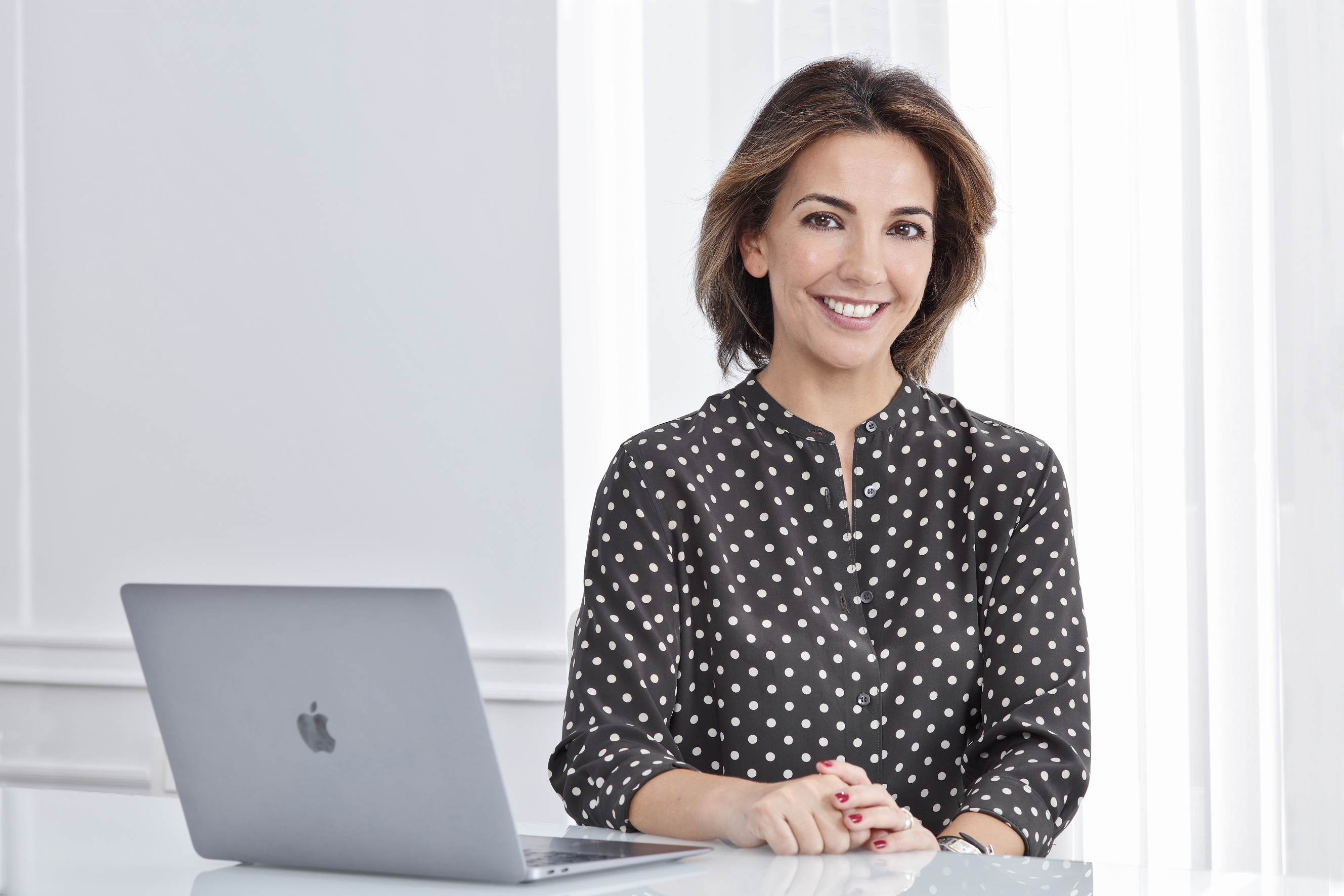
- Education: University of Navarra IESE Business School London School of Economics
- Occupations: Journalist, Entrepreneur
- Known for: PROA Comunicación founder
- Board member of: Woman Forward Foundation

Lucía Casanueva (Santander, 1975) is a Spanish journalist and entrepreneur, founder of PROA Comunicación in Madrid (2009) and a regular contributor to several magazines and newspapers.

== Education and journalistic career ==
After completing her secondary education in Vancouver, Canada, she graduated in journalism from the University of Navarra and obtained several postgraduate degrees from IESE BS and the London School of Economics and Political Science (LSE).

She has worked as a journalist for the daily newspaper Expansión and the magazine Actualidad Económica, and for the agencies Llorente y Cuenca, Kreab, Portocarrero and Edelman.

In 2008 she took part in the RTVE documentary "Al Filo de lo Imposible" (On the edge of the impossible). She went on a journey of several months with the team led by Sebastián Álvaro and Edurne Pasaban. The aim was to climb Manaslu, the 8th highest peak in the world at 8156m. Both the pre-trip training and the treks up to 5,000 metres, the hypoxia, the river crossings and the adaptation to scarcity were crucial to their subsequent human and professional development.

She also contributes to various media such as ABC, El Confidencial, Confilegal, El Diario Montañés, Forbes, El Debate, and El economista.

=== Some of her articles ===
- La comunicación de crisis y la credibilidad de la medicina de urgencias (Crisis communication and the credibility of emergency medicine).
- Benedicto XVI: una oda a la coherencia (Benedict XVI: an ode to coherence).
- Isabel II y el imperio de la buena comunicación (Elizabeth II and the empire of good communication).
- Hacia un nuevo modelo de liderazgo (Towards a new model of leadership)
- Los empresarios como solución (Entrepreneurs as a solution).
- La verdad es sexi (The truth is sexy).

== Entrepreneur ==
In 2009 she founded PROA Comunicación, a communications consultancy in Madrid.

In 2015, she formed a partnership with the lawyer Valvanuz Serna, and then began a period of expansion for the agency and the creation of alliances with other international agencies.

She has participated in different forums claiming the role of women and their leadership. Casanueva is a board member of the Woman Forward Foundation for Gender Equality, and a member of the International Women Presidents' Organisation, which promotes the role of women as entrepreneurs and leaders.

In 2015, she launched the PROA Observatory as a forum for debate on social impact issues, with the participation of prominent people from the political, business and cultural worlds. Since then, there has been a series of meetings with politicians, military, diplomatic and defence experts, judges, and business people.
