= The Editor (2026 film) =

- Teaser poster
- Spanish: El director
- Directed by: Dani de la Orden
- Screenplay by: Michel Gaztambide; Alejandro Hernández
- Based on: El director by David Jiménez
- Starring: David Verdaguer; Alberto San Juan; Carmen Machi; Nacho Fresneda; Emma Vilarasau; Fernando Colomo; Fernando Cayo
- Cinematography: Maria Codina
- Production companies: Fremantle; Beta Fiction Spain
- Distributed by: Beta Fiction Spain
- Release dates: 8 November 2026 (Seville); 20 November 2026 (Spain)
- Country: Spain
- Language: Spanish

The Editor or The Director (Spanish: El director) is a 2026 thriller film directed by Dani de la Orden and written by Michel Gaztambide and Alejandro Hernández based on the book by David Jiménez. It stars David Verdaguer and Alberto San Juan.

== Plot ==
The plot is based on the book El director, that explores the experience of journalist David Jiménez, a war correspondent who surprisingly became editor-in-chief of a major newspaper in Spain only to be dismissed a year later for being reluctant to compromise on editorial independence.

== Cast ==
- David Verdaguer as David Jiménez
- Alberto San Juan as Cardenal
- Anna Alarcón
- Xavi Sáez
- Pau Durà
- Carmen Machi
- Nacho Fresneda
- Emma Vilarasau
- Fernando Colomo
- Fernando Cayo
- Guillermo Toledo

== Production ==
Based on the book by David Jiménez, the screenplay was developed by Michel Gaztambide and Alejandro Hernández. Shooting locations included Cornellà. In 2023, RTVE purchased rights to the film while the project was in pre-production. The film was produced by Fremantle and Beta Fiction Spain. The project was presented at the 'El Cine que Somos' RTVE event in March 2026. In the event, San Juan described the story as "a journalistic thriller that explores the difficulty of reconciling the democratic system with the truth".

== Release ==
The Editor premiered at the 23rd Seville European Film Festival on 8 November 2026. Distributed by Beta Fiction Spain, the film was released theatrically in Spain on 20 November 2026.

== Reception ==
Philipp Engel of Cinemanía rated The Editor 3½ stars out of 5 stars, highlighting the appearances by San Juan as the moments the film shines on the most, although neither Verdaguer nor the mise-en-scène reach their full potential, considering that it "aims for Zodiac and stays in Spotlight.

Javier Ocaña of El País assessed that both De la Orden and the Hernández and Gaztambide duo made a "competent" job of adapting the book by Jiménez, although lamented the pervasive sense of a missed opportunity.

== Accolades ==
Year	Award	Category	Nominee(s)	Result	Ref.
2026	23rd Seville European Film Festival	Prize for Best Screenplay	Alejandro Hernández, Michel Gaztambide	Won	

== See also ==
- List of Spanish films of 2026
