= PROA Comunicación =

PROA Comunicación is a Spanish company founded in 2009. Dedicated to corporate communications and reputation management, it is the promoter of the "Observatorio PROA", and is based in Madrid, with offices in Barcelona, Bilbao, Valencia, Santander and Vigo. In 2023 it won the Anna Baschwitz Award for the best communications agency.

== History ==
The firm was founded in 2009 by the Cantabrian journalist Lucía Casanueva and takes its name from the magazine Proa a la mar. After working for the newspapers Expansión and Actualidad Económica, she became acquainted with the Spanish business world and worked in Spanish and international agencies like LLorente y Cuenca, Kreab and Edelman.

In its early days, the agency specialised in corporate, financial and crisis communications. In 2015, it was relaunched with the entry of Valvanuz Serna and expanded into the large consumer and professional services sectors. In 2020, it adopted a different strategic positioning with a new image, website, slogan and logo.

In 2022 it inaugurated its headquarters in Montalbán Street and presented a report on communication in times of crisis. It has international alliances with Vae Solis Communications and Corpcom.

It won the Ana Baschwitz Award for Best Communications Agency (2023) at the Eduardo Úrculo Cultural Centre in Madrid. The consultancy is part of the Woman Forward Foundation. It is the patron of the Woman Forward Awards for Corporate Governance and Gender Diversity.

== Observatorio PROA ==
"Observatorio PROA" are meetings with opinion leaders on topical issues, moderated by the consultancy's management team. The speakers are followed by a debate with the audience. They were created in 2017 to address current events from a communication point of view. They have covered various topics with the involvement of experts including politicians, businessmen, lawyers, journalists and military personnel.

Participants included José Luis Martínez-Almeida,Javier Ortega Smith, Jordi Sevilla, Cristobal Montoro, Ana Pastor,Juan Carlos Campo, Javier Zaragoza, Pau Molins, Manuel Sala, Borja Bergareche, Mirian Izquierdo, José Antonio Zarzalejos and Raimundo Herráiz, among others.
