= MARCA TV =

Spanish sports TV channel

- Country: Spain
- Broadcast area: Nationwide
- Headquarters: Madrid, Spain

Programming
- Language: Spanish
- Picture format: 576i (SDTV 16:9)

Ownership
- Owner: Unidad Editorial
- Sister channels: laSexta

History
- Launched: 28 August 2010
- Closed: 31 July 2013

MARCA TV was a Spanish sports television channel owned by Unidad Editorial. The channel was a joint venture between Mediapro, responsible for producing the channel's content, and Veo Televisión, licensee of the multiplex.

MARCA TV had the broadcast rights of the Euroleague since the 2012–13 season, shared with Teledeporte. It ceased broadcasting as of July 31, 2013 due to changes in Spanish regulations regarding TV channel ownership.

== History ==
The channel was launched on 28 August 2010 at 13:30. Its first broadcast was of the opening match of the 2010 FIBA World Championship. MARCA TV would broadcast those matches not televised by sister channel laSexta.

== Broadcast rights 2012 ==
=== National tournaments ===
- La Liga, Copa del Rey, Segunda División
- Primera División de Futsal

=== International events ===
International club competitions

- CEV Champions League
- Euro Hockey League
- Euroleague Basketball

World Championships

- 2012 FIFA Futsal World Cup

Tennis events

- Madrid Open

== See also ==
- MARCA
