= Gaspar Rosety =

Spanish journalist (1958–2016)

Gaspar Rosety Menéndez (29 July 1958 – 6 March 2016) was a Spanish journalist.

== Biography ==
Rosety was born in Gijón. His father died in 1974.

Rosety began his career at Radio Gijon in 1975, while also serving as the sports editor at El Noroeste. In 1979, he moved on to Intercontinental Radio of Madrid, and in 1982, he signed on with Antena 3 Radio with José María Garcia, whom he accompanied in 1992 at the COPE radio network. In 1997, he left COPE to join the Radio Voz network, where he served as director of sports and assistant to the CEO.

During this time, he also served as an investigative journalist at Diario 16, and wrote columns in La Voz de Galicia. In 1998, he was designated by FIFA as the official announcer for the Intercontinental Cup in Tokyo. He collaborated with Marca and Telemadrid until he was appointed Media Director and, in 2007, assistant to the President of Real Madrid. He continued in this capacity until he joined the Royal Spanish Football Federation in 2009, first as Media Director and later as assistant to President Ángel María Villar.

Rosety graduated with a bachelor's degree in journalism from the European University of Madrid, an international master's degree in Sports Law and Management from the Instituto Superior de Derecho y Economía (ISDE - the Graduate School of Law and Economy), and a master's degree in Sports Law from Institut Nacional d'Educació Física de Catalunya. In January 2014, Rosety was chosen as the president of the Madrid Association of Sports Law.

In his last years, Rosety acted as an adviser to the president of the Royal Spanish Football Federation, and as a faculty member of the Faculty of Arts and Communication of the European University of Madrid. He also served as a columnist for La Razón and La Voz de Galicia.

Rosety died on 6 March 2016 at the age of 57 from a stroke that he had suffered days before.
