= Anastopoulos =

Anastopoulos (Greek: Αναστόπουλος) is a Greek surname. Notable people with the surname include:

- Akim Anastopoulo (born 1960), American trial attorney and TV show judge
- Hali Anastopoulo, American TV producer
- Nikos Anastopoulos (born 1958), Greek football striker
