= A Recipe for Murder =

True crime documentary series

- Genre: Documentary
- Directed by: José Gómez
- No. of seasons: 1
- No. of episodes: 5

Production
- Executive producers: Hali Anastopoulo; Akim Anastopoulo

Original release
- Network: SkyShowtime
- Release: February 23, 2025

A Recipe for Murder, or Receta Para Un Asesinato, is a true life crime docuseries produced by Get Me Out Productions for SkyShowtime.

The series is directed by José Gómez, known for 11M: Terror in Madrid, a documentary about the 2004 Madrid train bombings. It was executive produced by Hali Anastopoulo and Akim Anastopoulo, produced by Get Me Out Productions and premiered on February 23, 2025.

The series chronicles the death and dismemberment of Colombian surgeon Edwin Arrieta by Daniel Sancho, an aspiring chef with a following on YouTube, in Thailand, in August 2023, which was covered worldwide by the media. Sancho, the son of Spanish actor Rodolfo Sancho, was tried and convicted in Thailand on August 29, 2024. Sancho initially claimed the killing was in self-defense, never pleading guilty to murder, but pled guilty to dismemberment and was sentenced to death, which was commuted to life in prison.

Gómez said the series centered on "issues of white privilege, of acquired right and the increasingly diffuse line between journalism and entertainment."

== Episodes ==
No.	Title	Original release date
1	"Part 1"	February 23, 2025
Part One explores the unlikely connection between Edwin Arrieta Arteaga and Daniel Sancho Bronchalo – two men from starkly different worlds whose lives would soon be under intense scrutiny. Edwin, a surgeon from modest Colombian roots, and Daniel, a YouTube chef and son of a famous actor with ties to Spanish high society, meet in Madrid, sparking a relationship that would intertwine their fates in ways neither could have foreseen. As their story unfolds, deeper questions about identity, privilege, and the media´s relentless attention begin to emerge...
2	"Part 2"	February 23, 2025
Part Two explores in detail the chronology of events that led to a horrific crime, starting with Daniel’s arrival on Thailand’s Koh Pha Ngan. Through now world-famous, extraordinary footage, we gain a rare, firsthand look at the tragedy, as Daniel, the man at its center, describes his own crime to the police and the surrounding cameras.The layers of deception and rumor start to emerge and fuel the start of a global media storm.
3	"Part 3"	February 23, 2025
Part Three concludes the investigation, unveiling the charges and potential fate to come for Daniel. It follows Daniel’s transport to prison on Koh Samui as he awaits trial, and explores Daniel’s psyche through the insights of leading psychologists and criminologists. While the court and the public become fixated on whether the murder was premeditated or not, the reality proves to be far more complex, prompting a closer examination of Daniel’s background, behavior, and the potential reasons behind the crime.
4	"Part 4"	February 23, 2025
Part four marks the tense buildup to the trial, where arguments surrounding the case split public opinion: was it premeditated murder, or was it an accident? Controversy mounts when Daniel's defense team is unexpectedly replaced, swapping a prominent Thai legal team for Spanish lawyers—a decision that triggers debate. As media attention reaches a fever pitch, the trial begins with a shocking twist: the release of a documentary featuring Daniel's father as its central voice. This unexpected development intensifies the already polarized public discussion and sets the stage for the courtroom battle ahead.
5	"Part 5"	February 23, 2025
Part five focuses on the trial itself: the evidence, the witnesses, and the intense arguments put forward by both the defense and prosecution. While the defense’s strategy appears flawed, the prosecution also faces challenges in proving premeditation. Controversy swirls on both sides, but it is the frenzied media attention that takes center stage, turning the trial into a spectacle. Opinions, often based on speculation rather than facts, spread across television and social media, creating a public judgment long before the verdict is announced. As tensions peak, the series culminates with the final decision: manslaughter or premeditated murder. Yet, beyond the verdict, what lingers is the media circus itself – a reflection of our time, where the court of public opinion often overshadows justice, leaving us to question what lessons can be learned from this case.

== Interviewed ==
Arietta's family members, including his parents, Leovaldo and Ana Marcela; sister, Darling Arrieta, and friend Víctor Jattin, are among those interviewed. Daniel Sancho's Spanish attorney, Marcos Garcia Montes; Surachate "Big Joke" Hakparn, the first officer who claimed the arrest of Arietta; Metapon, the Thai lawyer for the Arietta family; and police translator Chawait Lohitviset were also interviewed for the series, among many prominent Spanish journalists, including David Jiménez and Gumersindo Lafuente, and others.

== Release ==
A Recipe for Murder was released on February 23, 2025, on SkyShowtime.
