= El Economista =

El Economista may refer to:

- El Economista (Mexico), Mexican business and economics newspaper
- El Economista (Spain), Spanish daily newspaper
