= Recipe for Murder =

Recipe for Murder may refer to:

- Recipe for Murder, a 1932 Arnold Ridley play, filmed as Blind Justice (1934 film) and in review notable for first use of the word whodunit
- Recipe for Murder, a 1934 Vincent Starrett short story used as plot of film The Great Hotel Murder, 1935
- Recipe for Murder, a 2002 American TV film starring Gary Basaraba, Larissa Laskin and Richard Chevolleau
- Recipe for Murder, a 2003 episode of CSI: Crime Scene Investigation (season 3)
- Recipe for Murder (film), a 2011 Australian TV docudrama film
- A Recipe for Murder, 2025 true crime documentary film
