= Sisteplant =

Spanish multinational company

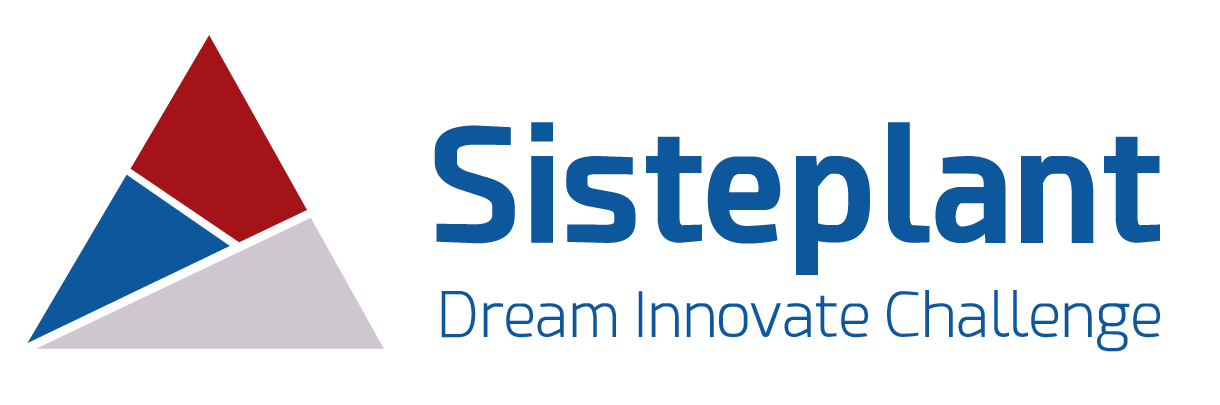
- Company type: Private
- Industry: Digitization and optimization of industrial processes: Aerospace; Automotive; Energy; Food; Infrastructures; Logistics; Pharmaceutical
- Headquarters: Madrid, Spain
- Area served: Spain, Brazil, Mexico
- Website: https://sisteplant.com/en/

Sisteplant is a Spanish multinational company specializing in the automation and digitalization of industrial processes. It was founded in Biscay in 1984. It is headquartered in Madrid, with offices in Bilbao, Barcelona, Seville, Pontevedra, Valencia, Brazil, and Mexico.

== History ==
The company was created in 1984 by Javier Borda, an industrial engineer. From its beginnings until the mid-1990s, the company was involved in the technological transformation and optimization of the Basque automotive, steel, and shipbuilding industries. It introduced information technologies and computerized maintenance systems. It has also spread to other regions of Spain, and to other sectors of the economy, such as energy, agri-food, aerospace and public administration. The company promoted productivity improvements through the implementation of lean manufacturing.

In the mid-1990s, they moved from mass production to high-tech sectors with small series or one-off production, such as aeronautics; and began their international expansion with the help of Spanish Ibex companies, opening offices in Mexico (Santiago de Querétaro), Brazil (São Paulo)) and China (Xuhui, Shanghai district).

The company has developed projects in the automotive, aerospace, energy, food, pharmaceutical, public administration, logistics and infrastructure sectors, both nationally and internationally.

Since 2007, it has developed the Tecnoiplant model, a technological, digital and organizational roadmap for the factory of the future, using its own software systems (Prisma, Captor, Promind, and Itracker). The company has also incorporated artificial intelligence tools to its digital platform, which is called Manufacturing Intelligence.

Sisteplant is a family company. Its capital is in the hands of its president, Javier Borda. Its shareholders included the venture capital fund Talde, the IBV group and other managing partners who later withdrew.

== Innovation and development ==
Since its inception, the company has dedicated 20% of its turnover to the development of R&D&I projects in collaboration with the Basque Government, universities and research centres.

Together with Tecnalia, it has participated in innovative technological developments for the production of continuous CNT (carbon nanotube) sheets for the aeronautical and marine industries. It has also participated in the design of the facilities for the integration and assembly of the HyperloopTT ultra-fast train capsules.

Since (1988) Sisteplant recognises professional and organisational merit through the Excellence Awards. The thirty-fourth edition was held in 2022.

== Awards and recognition ==
- National Industrial Engineering Award for the most innovative company by the General Council of Official Associations of Industrial Engineers (CGCOII) - 2019.
- Recognised by Actualidad Económica with the award for the 100 best ideas in 2018, 2019, and 2020.
- Recognised by Actualidad Económica as one of the 100 best companies to work for in Spain: 2018, 2022, and 2023.

== Related links ==
- Official site
