= Alfonso de Salas =

Spanish newspaper editor and journalist (1943–2019)

Alfonso de Salas (3 September 1943 – 24 September 2019) was a Spanish editor, founder of Cambio 16, and co-founder of the newspapers El Mundo and El Economista.

== Biography ==
After graduating in law and completing a master's degree in economics at the University of Paris, he began his professional activity in 1975, in the field of electric companies. Specifically as financial director of the Standard Electric company and four years later, as director of planning and organization of Endesa.

In 1982, his became a publisher. First from the publishing company of the magazine Cambio 16, from where he participated in the founding of Group 16. Under his presidency, the group He consolidated as a benchmark in the world of Spanish journalism, with more than fifteen headers and eight radio stations. In addition to refloating Diario 16, making it one of the most read newspapers in Spain.

In 1989, together with Pedro J. Ramírez, Balbino Fraga and Juan González, he founded the newspaper El Mundo del Siglo XXI, and chaired the Unidad Editorial, the publishing company of this newspaper. Director of the newspaper El Mundo (1989–2005), in a few years he placed him as the second most read diario in Spain. In 2005 he was relieved by Jorge de Esteban. On 28 February 2006 he launched the economic newspaper El Economista.

He died on 24 September 2019, aged 76.
