= Javier Borda =

Industrial engineer

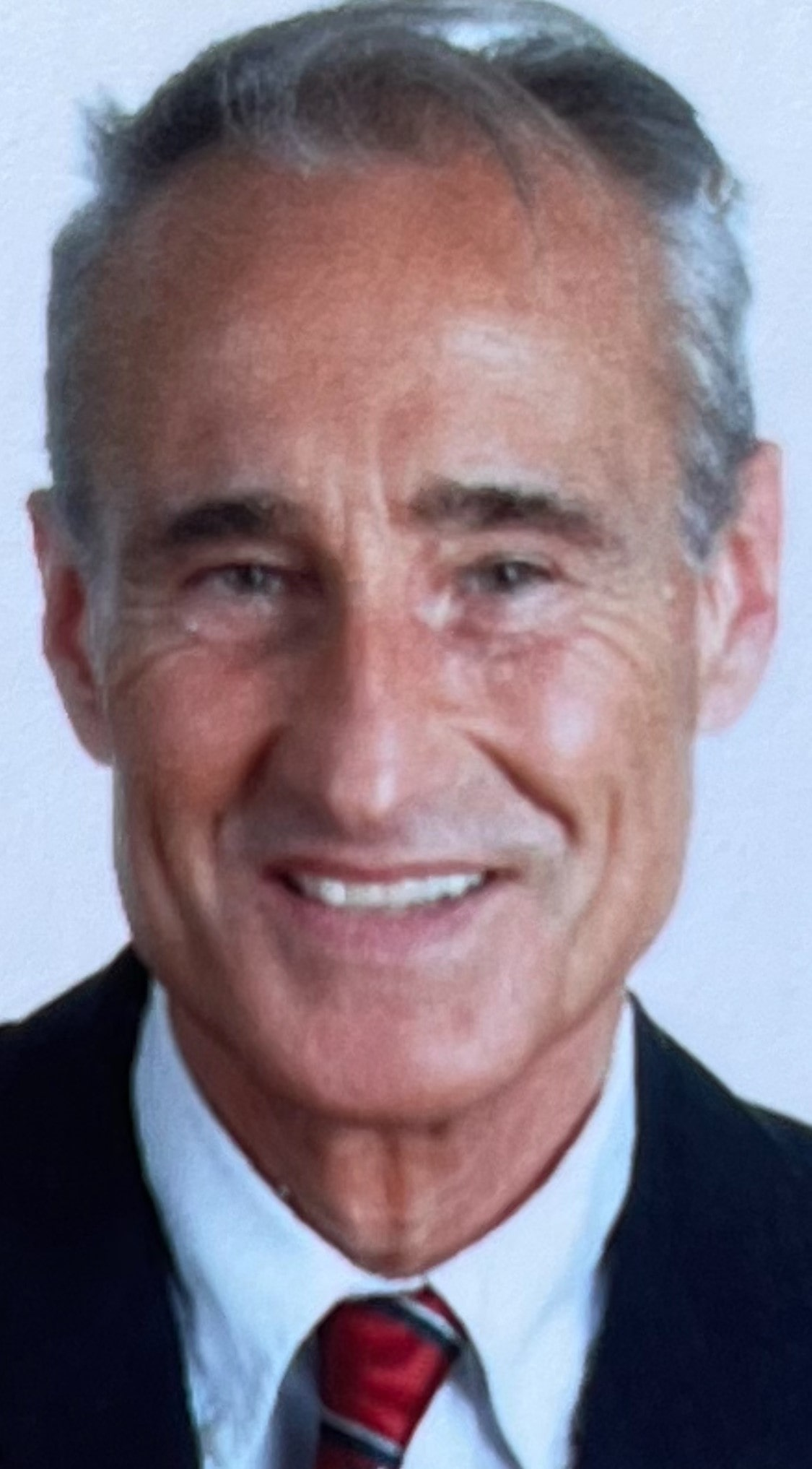
- Born: Bermeo, Biscay, Spain
- Education: Doctor in Industrial Engineering, Escuela Técnica Superior de Ingenieros Industriales de Bilbao (ETSII)
- Occupations: Engineer, entrepreneur and researcher
- Organization: Sisteplant
- Website: https://sisteplant.com/en/

Javier Borda (born 1951 in Bermeo, Biscay) is an industrial engineer, researcher-teacher of industrial systems with many scientific publications, and a Spanish businessman. He is president of Sisteplant, a multi-national company of industrial systems engineering.

== Education and professional career ==
He holds a Doctorate in Industrial Engineering from the Escuela Técnica Superior de Ingenieros Industriales de Bilbao (ETSII), a Master's Degree in Quantitative Models and an MBA from the Escuela Superior de Técnica Empresarial (ESTE) of the University of Deusto (1974-1976). He obtained his doctorate from the University of the Basque Country in 1988 with a thesis entitled "Architecture and CIM Computer Models in Thermoplastic Injection Moulding".

He was a professor at the University of Deusto (1984-2001), teaching Production Management; at the Aula Aeronautica of the Escuela Superior de Ingenieros Industriales de Bilbao (2005-8), teaching Advanced Production Systems for Aerospace and Defence; and at the King Juan Carlos University, teaching Advanced Maintenance, Repair and Overhaul (MRO) Systems for Defence in 2005.

AAs a scientist of industrial production, he advocates the social function of business. Throughout his career, he has helped companies large and small to develop their industrial models.

In 1984, he founded Sisteplant, a multinational company dedicated to the provision of technological solutions for the optimisation of production and maintenance processes in industry. He was Managing Director of Datalde (1984-1994) and later Chief Executive Officer. Between 1991 and 2000 he was a member of the now defunct IFIP (International Federation for Information Processing), part of UNESCO.

He received the Automoción-ACICAE Award from the Automotive Cluster of the Basque Country (2023) for his commitment to the Basque automotive sector.

== Publications ==
He is the author of six books as well as scientific and popular articles, focusing on the relationship between man and machine and the risks of digitalisation, robotics and the use of artificial intelligence.

In La Fábrica del futuro. Humana, inteligente, tecnológica y digital (The Factory of the Future. Human, Intelligent, Technological and Digital), published in 2016, he further explores the theory that without advanced industry, the future is practically non-existent. For the author, ICT is merely an "interpreter" and we need to place ourselves above artificial intelligence.

In Hombre y Tecnología: 4.0 y más (Man and Technology: 4.0 and Beyond), he examines the role of the human being in the Fourth Industrial Revolution and is sceptical about robotized industry if it is not matched by a higher technological level of the people who operate it. For Borda, the four basic pillars of the factories of the future are strategy, technology, people and habitability, and he advocates the creation of "laboratory factories" with management models that allow "producing with quality while experimenting to do better tomorrow".

As a scientist, he has participated in international congresses and several research projects. It's worth mentioning what he's done:

=== Books ===
- Borda Elejabarrieta, Javier (1991). Técnicas de mantenimiento avanzado y competitividad industrial. Ediciones Deusto. ISBN 978-84-234-0934-1.
- La Fábrica del Futuro. Humana, inteligente, tecnológica y digital (The Factory of the Future. Human, intelligent, technological and digital). Sisteplant Publishers, 2016. ISBN 978-84-608-6821-7
- Hombre y Tecnología: 4.0 y más (Man and Technology: 4.0 and beyond). Sisteplant Publishers, 2018. ISBN 978-84-09-02350-9
- El pensamiento filosófico y científico en la industria del futuro: El Hombre Nuevo (Philosophical and scientific thinking in the industry of the future: The New Man) Sisteplant Publishers, 2019. ISBN 978-84-09-16598-8
- Tecnología para el Mantenimiento Científico en las Plantas Cibernéticas (Technology for Scientific Maintenance in Cybernetic Plants). Editorial Sisteplant, 2022. ISBN 978-84-09-45254-5

=== Papers ===
- Elejabarrieta, Javier Borda (1998). "MRP-3 Concurrent integration of planning and scheduling in OKP (One of a kind production)". Advances in Production Management Systems. pp. 163–170. doi:10.1007/978-0-387-35304-3_15. ISBN 978-1-4757-4455-2.
- Borda, J. (2000). Evolución en la Problematica de Mantenimiento y Cambios Necesarios En Los Sistemas de Gestión. DYNA, 75(1), 17-22.
- Borda, J. (2006). Launching the aeronautical sector. Qualitas hodie: Excellence, sustainable development and innovation, (116), 62-63.
- Borda, J., Delegado, C., & Datalde, D. G. D. (1986). Concepts of systems theory. Application to the firm in a new technology environment. Bulletin of Economic Studies, 41, 563.
- Borda, J. (1990). Technology, organisational change and competitiveness. Economic Studies Bulletin, 45, 255.

=== Popular articles ===
- La sostenibilidad en la fábrica del futuro (Sustainability in the factory of the future) Cinco Días.
- VVAA: La Nueva Economía de la Defensa en un Nuevo Orden Mundial (The New Defence Economy in a New World Order) Ministerio de Defensa 2017.
- ¿Industrializar la fabricación de micro y nanoproductos? (Industrialising the manufacture of micro and nanoproducts?) Revista del Colegio Oficial de Ingenieros Industriales de Madrid, 2011.
- Industria: ¿Proteccionismo o precaución? (Industry: Protectionism or precaution?) El economista.
