= Okdiario =

Spanish digital newspaper

- El sitio de los inconformistas
- Type: Digital newspaper
- Founder: Eduardo Inda
- Founded: September 2015; 10 years ago
- Political alignment: Spanish nationalism; Far-right; Neoliberalism
- Language: Spanish
- City: Madrid
- Country: Spain
- Readership: 32 million
- Website: okdiario.com

Okdiario is a Spanish digital newspaper founded in September 2015 by the journalist Eduardo Inda. Its editorial ideology is aligned with neoliberalism and Spanish nationalism. The newspaper's motto is El sitio de los inconformistas ("The Place of Nonconformists). Inda approached the creation of this media outlet after leaving his position as deputy editor of the newspaper El Mundo, contributing €500,000 of capital, corresponding to the compensation received after his departure. The following year, Okdiario's publishing company received €300,000 from the state public entity ENISA in the form of a participative loan on advantageous terms, despite its outstanding debts.

The audience measurement company Comscore placed the number of Okdiario visits in May 2021 at 12 million, consolidating it as the eighth most viewed digital media outlet in Spain. Okdiario is known for promoting falsehoods, and has been at the forefront of several controversies related to misinforming and fabricating stories. According to a study by the University of Valencia published in November 2017, it is Spain's worst rated media outlet. On September 23, 2021, Inda presented the local edition of the media for the Balearic Islands, named Okbaleares. The newspaper regularly features columnists from far-right party Vox, for which Okdiario's op-eds have campaigned in various editorials. Various media and sources have pointed out their ultraconservative line.

== See also ==
- Post-truth politics
