= Men of West Hollywood =

American reality television series

- Genre: Reality; Drama series
- Created by: Hali Anastopoulo
- Opening theme: The Future is Now by Marloe
- Country of origin: United States
- Original language: English
- No. of seasons: 1
- No. of episodes: 10

Production
- Executive producers: Hali Anastopoulo; Akim Anastopoulo
- Production locations: Los Angeles, California
- Running time: 38–51 minutes
- Production company: Get Me Out Productions

Original release
- Network: Crackle
- Release: January 20, 2022

Men of West Hollywood is a reality television series that premiered and streamed on Crackle on January 20, 2022. All 10 episodes of the series were made available the same day.

The show was created by Hali Anastopoulo and produced by Get Me Out Productions. Get Me Out's co-founders, Anastopoulo and her father, lawyer and Eye for an Eye judge Akim Anastopoulo, are also the show's executive producers and directors.

Men of West Hollywood follows the lives of male socialites from West Hollywood, California, their friends and entourages, focusing on the personal drama between the parties and their daily lives. The series stars Justin Jedlica (featured on Botched and My Strange Addiction), digital media creator Brennen Taylor, David Barta (featured on Ex on the Beach and Paradise Hotel), Murray Swanby (featured on Ex on the Beach and What Happens at the Abbey), Darren Tieste and Landon Wetterstrom.

The producers were in discussions to expand the series to New York, San Francisco and Miami as well as Canada, Latin America and Europe, but no new series have been announced.

Men of West Hollywood won third place in 2022 for Marketing of a New Series at the Cablefax Faxie Awards.

== Episodes ==
No.	Title	Original release date
1	"Meet the Men"	January 20, 2022
Justin discusses his "throuple" romance. A photoshoot reveals Brennen as the group's comic YouTuber, while tensions rise between Darren and Landon. David confesses to his girlfriend why he can't be exclusive. Murray is ambushed by a needy ex while hosting a big club night at Rocco's.
2	"Making Waves"	January 20, 2022
The Men debrief at a morning-after brunch. Murray has a run-in with MMA fighter Dan Yates at the gym. Brennen confronts Landon for hitting on a model during an audition. Murray and Nick discuss the commitment issues of their rocky relationship. Tensions come to head at Darren's big pool party.
3	"3 Million"	January 20, 2022
Murray, Brennen and Darren attend a pet-psychic reading. Nick and David meet designer Andrew Christian to prep for an underwear runway show. Landon waxes his chest in hopes of wooing Hannah away from David. At a party, Darren flirts behind his boyfriend's back, while Landon takes a risk with Hannah.
4	"The Men Behind the Masks"	January 20, 2022
The Landon-David-Hannah love triangle heats up, causing one of them to get ejected from Brennen's party. Tensions escalate when the Men debrief over lunch. Brennen goes undercover with his mom and brother for a Tinder date. Murray throws a masquerade party where Justin is the target of a sexy prank.
5	"Men in the Mountains Pt. 1"	January 20, 2022
Masquerade drama continues when Laron learns of Darren's betrayal, Hannah gives David an ultimatum, and Nick gets tossed out for causing trouble. Darren invites the boys for a chill-out weekend in Big Bear, but chaos ensues between the various factions at a Roaring Twenties-themed dinner party.
6	"Men in the Mountains Pt. 2"	January 20, 2022
Big Bear tensions continue when the group goes fly fishing. Nick confesses to Murray how he feels, Landon pulls Hannah aside for a heart-to-heart, and Laron opens up to the group about his family struggles. That night, sexual secrets are revealed in a night of cabin romance.
7	"Looking Their Best"	January 20, 2022
Back in LA, during a session of "goat yoga," more Big Bear secrets are revealed. Later, drama unfolds on the red carpet of Darren's skincare launch. Landon is hurt to find Hannah on the red carpet with another man, while Justin gets a drink thrown in his face for scandalous "throuple" revelations.
8	"The Throuple"	January 20, 2022
At Darren's launch, the Landon, David and Hannah drama escalates, causing Landon to get completely smashed. Later, Brennen attends a tree-planting charity, the group take pole-dancing lessons, and Murray and Darren meet Justin's throuple. A fashion show downtown brings the whole group together.
9	"Strut, Sing, and Slap"	January 20, 2022
Justin and Nick look into "Scrotox" injections. The Men throw a runway costume contest for charity. Brennen, Murray and Darren open up about their tough pasts. Justin's throuple partners, Jason and Steven, join the group at Darren's one night, which blows up into a huge fight over dinner.
10	"The Birthday Blow Up Finale"	January 20, 2022
Darren hosts a very revealing Men of WeHo calendar shoot. A post-throuple-dinner argument explodes between Darren and Laron. Justin and Nick do a Scrotox check-up. Hannah tries to win back David with a big surprise. Tempers rise, as does the furniture, in a shocking brawl to end the season.
