= Máxima =

Máxima may refer to

- Máxima (magazine)
- Máxima FM, Spanish radio station
- Queen Máxima of the Netherlands, consort to the King of the Netherlands
- Máxima (TV series), a Dutch biographical television series
