= Paco Costas =

Spanish journalist (1931–2018)

- Born: Franscisco Costas Verde; 11 November 1931; Bueu, Spain
- Died: 11 July 2018 (aged 86); Madrid, Spain
- Employer: TVE
- Notable work: Todo es posible en domingo (1974); Cuatro tiempos (1974-75); La segunda oportunida (1978-79); Grand Prix: Así es la Fórmula 1 (1980); Así fue, así lo cuentan (1987)
- Website: www.pacocostas.com

Francisco Costas Verde, better known as Paco Costas, (11 November 1931 – 11 July 2018) was a Spanish journalist. He specialized in automotive topics.

== Career ==
Costas started his career by contributing columns on road safety to Diario de Ávila.

=== Television ===
In 1974, he began working at Televisión Española (TVE), first presenting a small segment dedicated to the engine in the program Todo es possible en Domingo (1974). His growing popularity allowed Costas to begin directing and presenting a series on TVE related to engines called Cuatro Tiempos (1974-1975).

Costas's popularity continued to rise with the Fernando Navarrete-scripted La Segunda Oportunidad (1978-1979), in which Costas advised viewers on driving practices.

In 1987, Costas presented the program Así fue, así lo cuentan, in which celebrities narrated their negative driving experiences to demonstrate how they could have been avoided.

In later years, Costas worked with TPA, as a commentator on Formula 1 races.

=== Press ===
Costas contributed to multiple publications, including El País, Pueblo, Diario 16 and Ya, as well as several specialized magazines, including Motor 16, Auto-diésel, Car & Driver and Tele-radio).

=== Radio ===
Costas also worked in radio, presenting and directing programs on the now-defunct Antena 3 Radio, and contributing to Lo que es la vida.

=== Later in life ===
Towards the end of his life, Costas devoted himself to lecturing on road safety in coordination with the Escuela de Conducción y Seguridad Vial Paco Costas (Paco Costas Driving and Road Safety School). In 2001 he published La Década Mágica, a magazine about motorsports.
