= David Jiménez (journalist) =

Spanish journalist and author (born 1971)

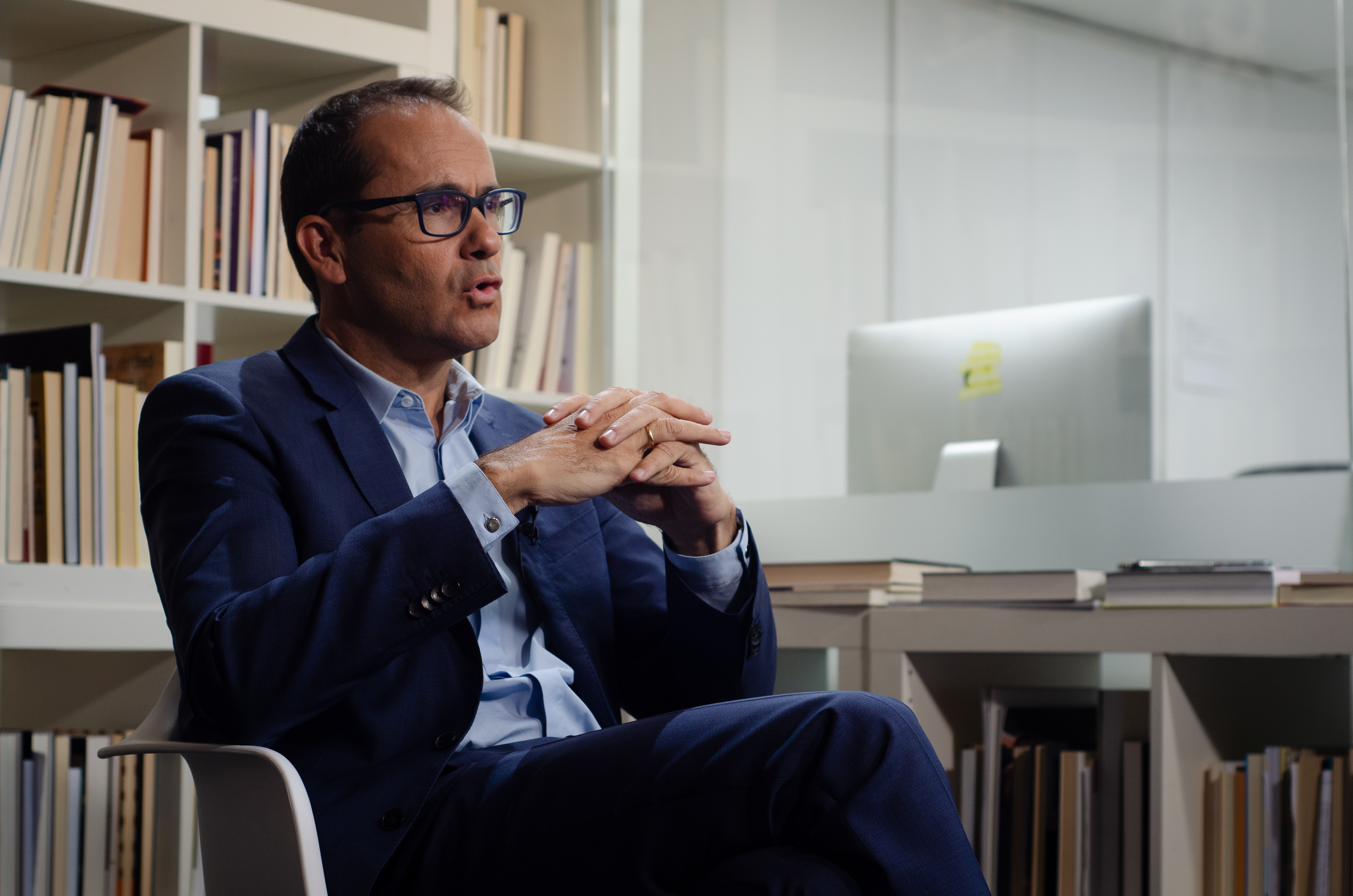
David Jiménez (2019).

David Jiménez García (Note: In this Spanish name, the first or paternal surname is Jiménez and the second or maternal family name is García.) (born 1971) is a Spanish journalist and author, who worked as long-term reporter and war correspondent before becoming editor-in-chief of El Mundo. He has written several books, including the bestseller El director.

== Biography ==
Jiménez has worked as a correspondent and war reporter in over 30 countries. Born in Barcelona on 11 January 1971, he graduated in journalism in 1994, and later that year started working for El Mundo as an intern on its Madrid newsroom. In October 1998 he became the paper's first correspondent in Asia, remaining there until 2014 and covering conflicts in Afghanistan, Kashmir, Sri Lanka, Pakistan or East Timor. His coverage of Tibet induced the Chinese government to ban him from returning to that country. He travelled twice clandestinely to North Korea and was the only Western reporter to stay in Fukushima through the nuclear disaster of 2011.

Jiménez was interviewed in the 2025 crime documentary A Recipe for Murder, which detailed the murder investigation of Colombian surgeon Edwin Arrieta and his convicted murderer Daniel Sancho in Thailand.

Jiménez' reports have been published in The Guardian, The Toronto Star, The Sunday Times, and Esquire magazine. He has appeared on the CNN and BBC television channels. He is currently a columnist for The New York Times.

An award-winning author, he has published five books, and his work has been translated into English, Chinese, German, and Italian.

=== Editor of El Mundo ===
On being awarded a Nieman scholarship from the University of Harvard in 2014, he worked for a period at MIT Media Lab, investigating digital challenges to the press. He returned to Madrid to take over the editorship of El Mundo, replacing Casimiro García-Abadillo, with the task of bringing the paper out of its period of crisis and leading its digital transformation.

His dismissal as editor became known on 25 May 2016, and followed his appearance on a talk programme on Onda Cero, in which he asked the presenter whether they accepted "ex-editors". His termination took place during a serious crisis for the newspaper and its owner Unidad Editorial, which was undertaking its third round of redundancies since 2009. The workforce were taking intermittent strike action in protest against a proposal to dismiss over 160 staff, a plan that Jiménez had opposed. Jiménez attributed his dismissal to his resistance to pressures that would have compromised the independence of the newspaper, and in June 2016 he was the first editor of a Spanish newspaper to take advantage of a constitutional "conscience clause" intended to protect the freedom of the press. He then sued the company and its president. After a year long legal battle, the company finally admitted that Jimenez had been dismissed without reason, and stated in writing that it would respect his freedom of expression in the future.

El director, his tell-all book about his tenure as editor, became and instant bestseller in Spain.

== Publications ==
His published works include his first book, Hijos del monzón ("Children of the Monsoon": Kailas, 2007), which won the award for the best Spanish travel book, and has been translated into English, German, Italian and Chinese. He has also published a novel, El botones de Kabul ("The Bellhop of Kabul": La Esfera, 2010), based on his experiences covering the Afghan war, and El lugar más feliz del mundo ("The happiest place in the world": Kailas, 2015). His latest book, El director, is being adapted as a TV series by Fremantle.
