= Ana Baschwitz =

Spanish journalist and author (1960–2022)

Ana Baschwitz y Gómez de las Bárcenas (Madrid, 1960—2022) was a Spanish journalist, publicist, professor and entrepreneur. Throughout her life she held various executive positions in businesses, associations and foundations, and developed a wide range of solidarity activities. She was the founder and president of the Asociación Víctimas del Covid-19. The Ana Baschwitz Communication Awards were created in 2023 in her memory.

== Education and career ==
Baschwitz graduated from the Complutense University of Madrid with a degree in Advertising and Public Relations (1982) and a PhD in Information Science (1997). Her doctoral thesis, "Las Relaciones Públicas integrales como concepto aglutinador de las herramientas en una concepción moderna de la comunicación social" (Integral Public Relations as an agglutinating concept of tools in a modern conception of social communication), was supervised by Jaime Urzaiz.

She taught for seven years at the Faculty of Communication Sciences of the Complutense University and also at the European Institute of Protocol at the Camilo José Cela University.

She began her career at Urzaiz Comunicación in 1980. In 2003, this agency was re-established under the name of AB Public Relations and under the presidency of Ana Baschwitz. In 2016, together with Luis Matamoros, and within the AB Group, she created the company Stil Kommunikation. She was also president and founder of Teleprofe, and Acadomia, and general secretary of the Madrid Association of Tourism Journalists.

In the world of media, she was a presenter on several television shows, including D Origen in TeleMadrid, where she presented the show "La Cocina de AmaW". An avid gourmet and traveller, she wrote several books on recipes and travel.

She was the director of the AICAD Foundation and taught free online Spanish classes to Ukrainian refugees through a virtual classroom. During the Covid-19 pandemic, and following the death of a family member, she founded the Association of Victims of Covid-19.

== Ana Baschwitz Communication Awards ==
After her death in 2023, these awards were created to recognise the work of communications professionals, agencies, media and journalists in three categories: best communications professional, best media and best communications agency.

La Hoja del Lunes of the Asociación de Periodistas de Alicante won the prize for best media in the first call (2023). TVE's Moisés Rodríguez won the best professional award and PROA Comunicación the best agency award.

== Publications ==
=== As an author ===
- Ensaladas templadas y ensaladas firmadas (Editorial Arnao, 1988), reedición en 2010 (Editorial Sepha)
- Hechizos mágicos de América y Los Secretos de los Famosos (Editorial Grupo Libro 88, 1991)
- 102 Pasteles Salados (Alianza Editorial, 2009)

=== As prologue writer ===
- Clemente Ferrer Roselló ¿Quién elige la mejor Publicidad? (Editorial Dossat 1991)
- Clemente Ferrer Roselló El Anunciante al habla (Editorial Dossat, 1992).

== Related links ==
- Ana Baschwitz Communication Awards
