= Surachate Hakparn =

Thai police officer

- สุรเชชษฐ์ หักพาล

Deputy Commissioner-General of the Royal Thai Police
- In office 1 October 2022 – 18 April 2024

Personal details
- Born: 29 October 1970 (age 56) Sadao, Songkhla, Thailand
- Spouse: Sirinadda Hakparn
- Education: Eastern Asia University
- Alma mater: Armed Forces Academies Preparatory School; Royal Police Cadet Academy; Mahidol University

Military service
- Allegiance: Thailand
- Branch/service: Royal Thai Police
- Years of service: 1994 – 2019; 2021 – 2024
- Rank: Police General

Surachate Hakparn (Thai: สุรเชชษฐ์ หักพาล; born on 29 October 1970) is a former Thai police officer who held the office of deputy national police chief of Thailand. He has been dismissed by royal command over alleged links to an illegal online gambling operation. He previously served as the chief of Immigration Bureau of Thailand. He had held several posts, including commissioner of the MPB, or Tourist Police Bureau.

== Early life ==
Surachate Hakparn was born in 1970 in Songkhla province. His father was a junior police officer who had close ties to Samer Damapong, a former deputy police chief.

== Career ==
He enrolled in Class 31 of the Armed Forces Academies Preparatory School. Afterwards, he joined Class 47 of the Royal Police Cadet Academy (RPCA). A rising star among RPCA Class 47 alumni, Surachate rose quickly through the ranks. After being appointed deputy inspector at age 24 in Chiang Mai province, he rose to inspector in 2000 at age 30, deputy superintendent in 2004, and superintendent in 2008.

In 2012, he was appointed the deputy commander of Songkhla Police Force. During this time, he also led a forward command overseeing four insurgency-hit border districts, which added to his service record. In 2015, he was promoted to the rank of police major general.

Since leading a crackdown on foreigners illegally staying in Thailand in 2017, Surachate has become one of the most visible faces of the Royal Thai Police. His handling of the case of a Saudi woman who narrowly avoided deportation from Thailand on her way to Australia earned him praise.

In a short period of time, he rose through the ranks and became an acting commander of the office of the Commissioner General, where he was responsible for policy coordination with the prime minister. After that, he was appointed deputy commander of the Patrol and Special Operations Division, and then he was promoted to the position of chief of the Office of the Commissioner-General.

After that, he was appointed the deputy commander of the Patrol and Special Operations Division, and then he was promoted to the position of chief of the Office of the Commissioner-General. He was then appointed commander of the Tourist Police Division and the Patrol and Special Operations Division. In August 2018, he was named assistant spokesman for Deputy Prime Minister Prawit Wongsuwan. He was appointed as the chief of the Immigration Bureau in September 2018 and removed from his post in 2019 for unclear reasons. As chief of the Immigration Bureau, he frequently appeared in news headlines.

He was reappointed to the Royal Thai Police in an advisory position by Prime Minister Prayut Chan-o-cha in March 2021. The position was newly created and is equal in rank to an assistant police chief position. Later that year, he assumed the position of deputy police chief.

In 2023, he was involved in the murder investigation of Colombian surgeon Edwin Arrieta and his convicted murderer Daniel Sancho, an aspiring chef with a following on YouTube on the island of Koh Pha-ngan, and was interviewed in the documentary series about the crime, A Recipe for Murder.

On January 29, 2024 he was one of the leaders of the attempted deportation of the opposition musical group Bi-2 in Bangkok by Russian diplomats, which was prevented by the Israeli consulate

Surachate was suspended from the post of deputy national police chief over a conflict with national police chief Torsak Sukvimol in March 2024 by Thai prime minister, Srettha Thavisin, but reinstated in April. He was again suspended from the police force a day later along with four other police officers over alleged links to an illegal online gambling operation. By a royal command published on August 18, 2024 and retroactive to April 18, Surachate was dismissed from the force due to a pending investigation of a serious breach of discipline stemming from the alleged involvement in the online gambling network.
