= Diario 16 (online newspaper) =

Spanish newspaper

- El diario de la Segunda Transición
- Format: Online newspaper
- Founded: 2015
- Language: Spanish
- Headquarters: Madrid
- ISSN: 9968-2125
- Website: diario16plus.com

Diario 16 (Spanish for "Daily 16" or "Newspaper 16") is a Spanish-language online newspaper published in Madrid, Spain, since 2015. It is considered a follow-up of the namesake defunct newspaper; its new motto is "El diario de la Segunda Transición" (Spanish for "The newspaper of the Second Transition").
