= Alfonso Ortuño =

Spanish painter (1925–2011)

- Born: 23 April 1925; Barcelona, Spain
- Died: 11 March 2011 (aged 85); Godella, Valencia, Spain
- Known for: Landscapes, seascapes and Mediterranean scenes
- Movement: Impressionism

Alfonso Ortuño (23 April 1925 – 11 March 2011) was a Spanish painter known for his expressive use of colour and interpretations of Mediterranean landscapes and everyday life. Born in Barcelona, he spent much of his life in the Valencian Community, particularly in Godella, where he died in 2011.

== Biography ==
Ortuño was born in Barcelona on 23 April 1925. He moved to Valencia at the age of ten and began painting at an early age. He developed his technique through his association with the Círculo de Bellas Artes (Circle of Fine Arts).

He belonged to a generation of Spanish painters influenced by Impressionism who subsequently developed individual artistic styles. His work was strongly influenced by the landscapes and light of the Mediterranean region.

Ortuño died on 11 March 2011 in Godella, Valencia, aged 85.

== Artistic style and work ==
Ortuño's paintings included landscapes, seascapes, rainy street scenes, portraits and still lifes. He frequently used a palette knife to apply paint, creating distinctive textures and expressive surfaces.

Although his earlier work included a more subdued colour palette, his mature paintings emphasized vivid colours and the light of the Mediterranean. His approach to painting was described as interpretative rather than strictly representational.

His work combined elements of Impressionism with an individual style characterized by spontaneity and emotional expression. Art critic Olga Real described his artistic language as drawing upon both modern painting traditions and classical sensibilities.
