= Veo7 =

Cinema television network

- Country: Spain
- Broadcast area: Spain
- Headquarters: Madrid, Spain

Programming
- Language: Spanish
- Picture format: 1080i HDTV

Ownership
- Owner: Unidad Editorial

History
- Launched: 30 November 2005 (original); 18 June 2025 (relaunch)
- Replaced: GOL Play (on DTT)
- Closed: 1 January 2012 (original)
- Former names: Veo Televisión (2005–2008; 2011–2012)

Links
- Website: veo7.com

Veo7 is a new cinema television network created by Unidad Editorial.

== History ==
From 2005 to 2012, Veo7 was active and streaming mostly news. In 2009, they got the Guinness World Record for the longest interview. In 2011 they passed through financial troubles which caused them to close.

After the television channel GOL PLAY disappeared from TDT, Unidad Editorial decided to revive this television channel; now it will stream mostly films and series of episodes.

== Awards ==
- Guinness World Record for Longest Interview (2009).
