= Lucio del Álamo =

Spanish journalist (1913–1988)

Personal information
- Full name: Lucio del Álamo Urrutia
- Date of birth: 2 March 1913
- Place of birth: Amurrio, Spain
- Date of death: 27 June 1988 (aged 75)
- Place of death: Madrid, Spain
- Position: Defender

Senior career*
Years	Team	Apps	(Gls)
1930–1931	Amurrio Club		
1931–1932	Athletic Club		
1932–1933	Real Valladolid		
President of the APM
In office
April 1951 – March 1955
President of the APM
In office
April 1967 – December 1978
- * Club domestic league appearances and goals

Lucio del Álamo Urrutia (2 March 1913 – 27 June 1988) was a Spanish footballer, journalist, writer, and politician. He played as a defender for Athletic Bilbao and Real Valladolid in the early 1930s, but he is best known for his work as a journalist, director of various media outlets, and also a representative in the Francoist Cortes.

== Early life, family and education ==
Del Álamo was born on 2 March 1913 in the Álava. Del Álamo studied Philosophy and Literature in Deusto and in Valladolid, and journalism at the El Debate school.

== Career ==
=== Football ===
Del Álamo began playing football while at the Colegio de los Jesuitas in Orduña, where he met and played with Alfonso Aparicio, who later played for Atlético Madrid. In his youth, he played for Amurrio Club in the early 1930s, from where he joined Athletic Bilbao, featuring in only two friendly matches in the 1931–32 season, one as a starter and one as a substitute, but both ending in victories, over Real Betis (5–1) and Castellón (8–0). He played the following season with Real Valladolid, and then retired from playing in 1933, aged only 20.

=== Journalism ===
In 1934, del Álamo joined La Gaceta del Norte in Bilbao as an editor. After the Spanish Civil War, del Álamo held several important positions, such as director of newspaper Hoja del Lunes in Bilbao (1940), Radio Nacional de España (1943), sports daily Marca (1947), El Alcázar (1968–1971), and Hoja del Lunes in Madrid (1973–1977). He was the founder of the weekly 7 fecha and other publications and also directed the magazines Crítica and Careta.

In April 1951, the 38-year-old del Álamo was appointed president of the Asociación de la Prensa de Madrid (APM, Press Association of Madrid), a position that he held for four years until March 1955, and then again from April 1967 to December 1978 for a total of 15 years and 8 months. His first term as president was uneventful, but his second brought dramatic professional moments in which the Press Association had to face problems, such as the closure of the newspaper "Madrid" by the government in 1971, a war for the journalistic profession against the academic authorities who were putting obstacles in the way of the validation of the degrees of the old Official School of Journalism and the years of work for the university degrees awarded by the recently created Faculty of Information Sciences, and also the first journalists' strike after the war in defence of professional secrecy (February 1976).

However, during his second term as president, del Álamo achieved his dream of providing Madrid journalists with the decent housing at affordable prices that they had been yearning for years. Under del Álamo's presidency, the APM built the Ciudad de los Periodistas (City of Journalists) in the north of the Spanish capital, a development of 15 towers divided into five blocks (which were named after illustrious journalists: Larra, Cavia, Camba, Balmes, and Azorín), containing 1,010 apartments, and which were sold at prices well below market prices to all the Association's journalists who wanted them (more than 700, almost 75 percent of the members). The operation was, socially, a success, but economically, a fiasco, leaving the APM with a debt of more than one billion pesetas, so in order to mitigate that, he had to sell off its most important and historic asset, its headquarters at the Palacio de la Prensa in Madrid's Callao Square. Álamo eventually resigned from his position as president due to the enormous economic losses caused by the construction of the Ciudad de los Periodistas, mainly due to poor management.

Del Álamo combined his position as president of the APM with the presidency of the National Federation of Press Associations of Spain (FAPE) from 1951 to 1955, and from 1967 to 1977. In 1940, he was Provincial Delegate for Popular Education and, in 1946, he was appointed National Delegate for the Press of the Movement. In 1944, he was appointed national head of Radio Broadcasting, and in March 1965, when the Provincial Press, Radio, Television, and Advertising Union was created, he was appointed its president.

=== Politics ===
A member of the Juntas de Ofensiva Nacional-Sindicalista (JONS), when they merged with Falange Española, del Álamo became part of the new organization. During the Civil War in the late 1930s, del Álamo fought with the Nationalist faction on the Asturias front and, after the war, he was simultaneously appointed councilor of the Bilbao City Council and, later, deputy for the province of Biscay.

Del Álamo was a member (attorney) of Francoist Cortes from 1950 to 1954, and again from 1964.

=== Writing ===
In the early 1940s, Del Álamo wrote three books, Charlas del Sábado (1941), Charlas de España, Los Gibraltareños económicos, and El último muerto de la Guerra de España (1944).

== Awards and honours ==
In 1965, del Álamo was awarded the Francisco Franco National Journalism Prize for his articles published in Arriba, Hierro de Bilbao, La Actualidad Española, and La Hoja del Lunes de Madrid. That same year he won the Prize for journalistic articles on Zurbarán and, in 1965, he was named best columnist of the year in the El Pueblo newspaper competition. He was awarded the Mariano de Cavia Prize in 1970, he was named Honorary Journalist in 1976.

== Personal life and demise ==
Del Álamo died in Madrid on 27 June 1888, at the age of 75.

== Works ==
- Charlas del Sábado (1941)
- Charlas de España
- Los Gibraltareños económicos
- El último muerto de la Guerra de España (1944)
