= El Mundo (Spain) =

Spanish daily newspaper

- Front page, 1 June 2009
- Type: Daily newspaper
- Format: Compact
- Owner: Unidad Editorial S.A.
- Founders: Alfonso de Salas; Pedro J. Ramírez; Balbino Fraga; Juan González
- Editor: Jorge de Esteban
- Founded: 23 October 1989; 36 years ago, as El Mundo del Siglo Veinte
- Political alignment: Centre-right
- Language: Spanish
- Headquarters: Madrid, Spain
- Circulation: 34,485 (2024)
- Sister newspapers: Marca; Expansión
- ISSN: 1697-0179 (print); 1697-0179 (web)
- Website: elmundo.es

El Mundo (Spanish: [el ˈmundo]; lit. 'The World'), before El Mundo del Siglo Veintiuno, is the second largest printed daily newspaper in Spain. The paper is considered one of the country's newspapers of record along with El País and ABC. In 2024, its number of daily sales was 34,485.

== History and profile ==
El Mundo was first published on 23 October 1989. Perhaps the best known of its founders was Pedro J. Ramírez, who served as editor until 2014. Ramirez had risen to prominence as a journalist during the Spanish transition to democracy. The other founders, Alfonso de Salas, Balbino Fraga and Juan González, shared with Ramírez a background in Grupo 16, the publishers of the newspaper Diario 16. Alfonso de Salas, Juan Gonzales and Gregorio Pena also launched El Economista in 2006.

El Mundo, along with Marca and Expansión, is controlled by the Italian publishing company RCS MediaGroup through its Spanish subsidiary company Unidad Editorial S.L. Its former owner was Unedisa which merged with Grupo Recoletos in 2007 to form Unidad Editorial, current owner of the paper.

The paper has its headquarters in Madrid, but maintains several news bureaus in other cities. The daily has a national edition and ten different regional editions, including those for Andalusia, Valencia, Castile and León, the Balearic Islands and Bilbao. It is published in tabloid format.

In 2005 El Mundo started a supplement for women, Yo Dona, which was modelled on IO Donna, a supplement of the Italian daily Corriere della Sera.

In January 2014 Pedro J. Ramírez, editor of the paper, was fired from his post. He argued that reporting on corruption scandals involving Spanish Prime Minister Mariano Rajoy led to his sacking. Casimiro García-Abadillo served as editor until April 2015, when he was replaced in turn by David Jiménez.

== Editorial stance ==
Editorially, El Mundo often expresses the mainstream views of the secular centre-right with independent and liberal overtones.

According to its ideological principles, "it aspires to be a progressive newspaper, committed to defending the current democratic system, public freedoms, and human rights included in the Universal Declaration promulgated by the UN and in the European Convention of Human Rights."

=== Political impact ===
El Mundo has played a key role in uncovering a number of scandals, among them embezzlement by the commander of the Guardia Civil, accusations of insider trading and tax fraud by the governor of the Central Bank of Spain and aspects of the Bárcenas affair. Investigative reporting by the staff of El Mundo also revealed connections between the terrorist Grupos Antiterroristas de Liberación (GAL) and the Socialist administration of president Felipe González, revelations that contributed to his defeat in the 1996 general elections.

In October 2005, El Mundo revealed that Nazi Aribert Heim (aka "Doctor Death") had been living in Spain for 20 years, probably with help from the ODESSA network, in collaboration with Otto Skorzeny, who had helped set up one of the most important ODESSA bases of operation in Spain, during the rule of Francisco Franco.

After the 2004 Madrid train bombings, the newspapers El Mundo and La Razón, the regional television channel Telemadrid and the COPE radio network alleged that there had been inconsistencies in the explanations given by the Spanish judiciary about the bombings. Other Spanish media, such as El País, ABC and the Cadena SER radio network, accused El Mundo and the other media of manipulation over this issue. The bombings and the results of the subsequent judicial inquiry are still debated in Spain today.

== Circulation ==
The circulation of El Mundo rose in the 1990s. It was

- 209,992 copies in 1993
- 268,748 copies in 1994
- 68,813 copies in 2020
- 34,485 copies in 2024

In 2001, El Mundo had a circulation of 291,000 copies and it was 312,366 copies the next year. The paper had a circulation of 300,000 copies in 2003, making it the third best-selling newspaper in the country.

Based on the findings of the European Business Readership Survey, El Mundo had 11,591 readers per issue in 2006. Its circulation between June 2006 and July 2007 was 337,172 copies. The 2007 circulation of the paper was 337,000 copies. It was 338,286 copies in 2008 and had 200,000 readers for the printed edition in 2009. The circulation of the paper was 266,294 copies in 2011. In April 2020 the newspaper had 51,526 readers of the printed edition, in February 2024 34,485.

=== Digital readership ===
El Mundo (elmundo.es) is currently the second digital newspaper in Spanish.

Many online readers are in Latin America, and the website has an edition for the Americas (mundoamerica.com). However, digital expansion has done little to offset the decline in revenues from Spanish advertisers since 2008. The newspaper aims to increase digital profits via a subscription model. It launched a current affairs outlet only accessible to subscription customers, named ORBYT.

== See also ==
- Controversies about the 2004 Madrid train bombings
- Spanish newspapers
