= Pedro J. Ramírez =

Spanish journalist (born 1952)

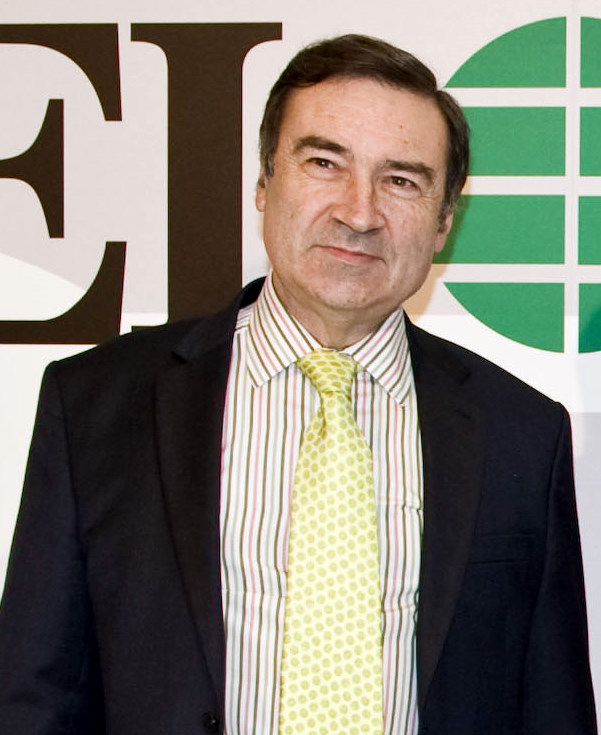
- Born: Pedro José Ramírez Codina; 26 March 1952 (age 74); Logroño (La Rioja), Spain
- Occupation: Journalist

Pedro José Ramírez Codina (born 26 March 1952), widely known as Pedro J. Ramírez, is a Spanish journalist. When he was appointed to manage Diario 16 at the age of 28, he became Spain's youngest editor of a national newspaper. In 1989 he founded the newspaper El Mundo, managing it continuously until 2014, making him the longest-serving editor of any Spanish national newspaper. He has collaborated with several radio and television programmes and has published a dozen books.

He was married (until 2016) to the designer Ágatha Ruiz de la Prada, and they have two children born in 1987 and 1990. He has a daughter from a previous marriage to Rocío Fernández Iglesias.

== Early life ==
Born on 26 March 1952 in Logroño, he was raised in a middle-class family and for 13 years he received his primary and secondary education at the Hermanos Maristas school in Logroño. He studied journalism at the University of Navarra, where he also began a degree in law. While there, he directed the university's Theatre Group, participating in several national and international festivals. He graduated with a degree in journalism in 1973 with a thesis titled 'Towards Informative Theatre'. Upon finishing his degree, he worked as a lecturer in Contemporary Spanish Literature at Lebanon Valley College in Pennsylvania, living in the United States during the decisive year of the Watergate case. He interviewed the editor of The Washington Post, Ben Bradlee, for the magazine La Actualidad Española, along with other important figures at the time in US media. Lebanon Valley College presented him with an 'honorary degree' in Humanities.

== Professional beginnings ==
From 1975 to 1980 he worked at the newspaper ABC, writing the Sunday section on political analysis called Crónica de la Semana. On 17 June 1980, at 28 years old, he was appointed editor of the newspaper Diario 16, then selling barely 15,000 copies and threatened with closure. However, within two years the newspaper had reached a circulation of 100,000 copies, and five years after that it would attain 150,000, according to figures of the OJD, the Office of Circulation Verification.

The most important event of the time was coverage of the attempted coup d'état on 23 February 1981. Diario 16 maintained a resolute editorial stance against those leading the coup. On 23 February 1982, on the first anniversary of the coup attempt, Pedro J. Ramírez was expelled from the Court of Justice where the trial was held against those involved, as supporters of the coup refused to appear in court as long as the editor of Diario 16 was present. The Military Justice Supreme Council revoked his credentials and forced him to leave the courtroom. This incident led to a historic resolution issued by the Constitutional Court, dismissing the decision by the Military Justice and proclaiming readers' rights to information for the first time since the establishment of democracy.

In 1986 he was named publications director for the newspaper's parent company, Grupo 16. He was elected president of the Spanish Committee of the International Press Institute (IPI), and in September 1988 joined the organisation's global Executive Committee. On 8 March 1989 he was dismissed as director of Diario 16 because of disagreements with the editor of the newspaper about the allegedly sensationalist tone of reports concerning the GAL (Anti-terrorist Liberation Groups).

During this period, Ramírez was sued several times for libel, the most serious of these being when he was found guilty on 4 October 1993 by the Supreme Court of Spain and disqualified from the exercise of journalism. This sentence was appealed, and the appeal denied and the first sentence confirmed by the Constitutional Court of Spain on 14 October 1998.

== Editor of El Mundo ==
On 23 October 1989, seven months after his dismissal, he founded the newspaper El Mundo, along with three high-ranking executives from Grupo 16: Alfonso de Salas, Balbino Fraga and Juan González. More than 50 Diario 16 journalists quit their jobs and joined the project. The parent group of the British newspaper The Guardian was one of its first shareholders, and the Italian daily Corriere della Sera invested a year later.

In the 1990s, El Mundo stood out for its investigations on corruption scandals carried out by successive socialist governments, and particularly for its exclusive exposure of the socialist government's implication in the GAL plot that led to the murder of more than two dozen Basque activists, mainly in the south of France. These revelations led to trials and convictions, including those of the former Interior Minister José Barrionuevo and his associate Rafael Vera, for the kidnapping of Segundo Marey; those of General Galindo and the civil governor of Guipuzcoa, Julen Elgorriaga, for the murder of Lasa and Zabala, and that of Rafael Vera himself for illegal appropriation of funds belonging to the Ministry.

In 1997, Pedro J. Ramírez was appointed president of the Commission for Freedom of Expression of the World Association of Newspapers (WAN), and for many years travelled to countries including China, Algeria, Turkey and Venezuela to request the freedom of imprisoned journalists and the repeal of oppressive laws against the media.

El Mundo supported the Aznar government in general terms during its first term (1996–2000), but was somewhat critical when during its second term when it decided to support the Bush policy in Iraq. On the eve of the Azores summit, Pedro J. Ramírez published one of his routine Sunday letters, titled 'One Hundred Reasons against the Invasion of Iraq.'

After Zapatero's rise to power, El Mundo pushed forward with the investigation of the March 11 massacre, presenting what the newspaper deemed significant flaws in the official version, but with a less rigorous investigation policy than their former exclusives during the 1990s. From the editorial perspective, it has opposed negotiations with ETA and the new Catalan Statute, which led to votes cast for the Partido Popular and the small party headed by Rosa Díez during the general elections held on 9 March 2008.

The Office of Circulation Verification (OJD) confirmed that during its first year El Mundo obtained a circulation of more than 100,000 copies, while in 2007 it surpassed the mark of 335,000. According to the General Study on Media (EGM), El Mundo has more than 1,300,000 readers. All of these indicators consolidate it as the second-largest national newspaper, behind El País.

According to the OJD, at the end of 2007 El Mundo had more than 11 million individual users per month. Based on the Alexa rankings, it was the world leader for electronic information in Spanish.

In 2013 it became evident that the Rajoy government was not happy about some of the content of El Mundo, for example, the publication of text messages from Rajoy to Luis Barcenas. Ramirez blamed government pressure for his being replaced as editor in 2014, although there may have been other factors given the decline in the paper's finances since 2007. After being ousted as editor he contributed a series of Sunday letters to the newspaper for a few months, before turning his attention to setting up a news website El Español, which went online in 2015.

== Sex video scandal ==
In October 1997 a covertly filmed sex video was circulated which involved Ramírez and a woman, Exuperancia Rapú Muebake. Following a criminal investigation, the Madrid Court convicted the former personal aide of Felipe González at the Moncloa, Ángel Patón; the former civil governor of Guipúzcoa, José Ramón Goñi Tirapu; and four others, of violation of the right to privacy, sentencing them from two to four years in prison. The sentence, upheld by the Supreme Court, established that the purpose of the entrapment had been to change the editorial stance of El Mundo.

His wife, Agatha Ruiz de la Prada, has never mentioned this matter in public.

== The purchase of Recoletos ==
In 2007, Unedisa, the publishing company of El Mundo -already widely controlled by the RCS group, owner of Corriere della Sera- acquired 100% of the shares in Grupo Recoletos, a leader in specialised press in Spain. As a result of this operation, Pedro J. Ramírez, as General Editorial Director, was put in charge of content published in newspapers such as Marca, Expansión and Diario Médico; magazines including Telva and Actualidad Económica, and the television channel Televisión Digital Veo TV. Until 2014 he shared these responsibilities along with those of Editor of El Mundo.

== Awards ==
- 1981. Golden Oscar of Communication for Best Information Contributor
- 1983. Journalist of the Year (Roundtable discussions for Mundo Abierto radio)
- 1983. Premio Libertad (Freedom Award) as Editor of Diario 16 (Club Liberal 1812)
- 1984. Liderman Award for Best Newspaper Editor
- 1991. Víctor de la Serna Award for Best Journalistic Effort (Madrid Press Association)
- 1992. Mariano José de Larra Award (Roundtable discussions for Mundo Abierto)
- 1995. Premio Libertad de Expresión (Freedom of Speech Award) (León Felipe Foundation)
- 2006. Montaigne Award (Tübingen University, Germany)
- 2006. Fape Award (Federation of Press Associations)
- 2007. Isaiah Berlin International Award (Santa Margherita Ligure, Italy)
- 2013. First Amendment Award given by the Eisenhower Fellows, Spain.

== Publications ==
- How the Elections Were Won. (1977) Editorial Planeta ISBN 978-84-320-0288-5 e ISBN 978-84-287-0488-5
- Press and Freedom. (1980) ISBN 978-84-7209-104-7
- The Complete King. (1981) (in collaboration with the journalists, Pilar Cernuda, José Oneto and Ramón Pí) ISBN 978-84-85861-01-9, ISBN 978-84-226-1300-8 and ISBN 978-84-226-1804-1
- The Year Franco Died. (1985) ISBN 978-84-01-33285-2
- The Rose and its Thorn: Both Sides of Felipism. (1989) ISBN 978-84-320-7542-1
- The World in My Hands. (1991) ISBN 978-84-253-2248-8
- Spain without a Project: The Felipista Decade. (1993) ISBN 978-84-460-0205-5
- David against Goliath: Felipism Checkmated. (1995) ISBN 978-84-7880-539-6
- Bitter Victory: The Hidden Story behind Aznar’s Historic Victory over González.(2000) ISBN 978-84-08-03653-1 and ISBN 978-84-9734-427-2
- Getting Even: The Aznar Years (1996-2000). ISBN 978-84-9734-181-3
- My 100 Best Letters from the Editor: 25 Years in the Life of Spain (1980-2005). ISBN 978-84-9734-329-9
