= Hali Anastopoulo =

American TV producer and director

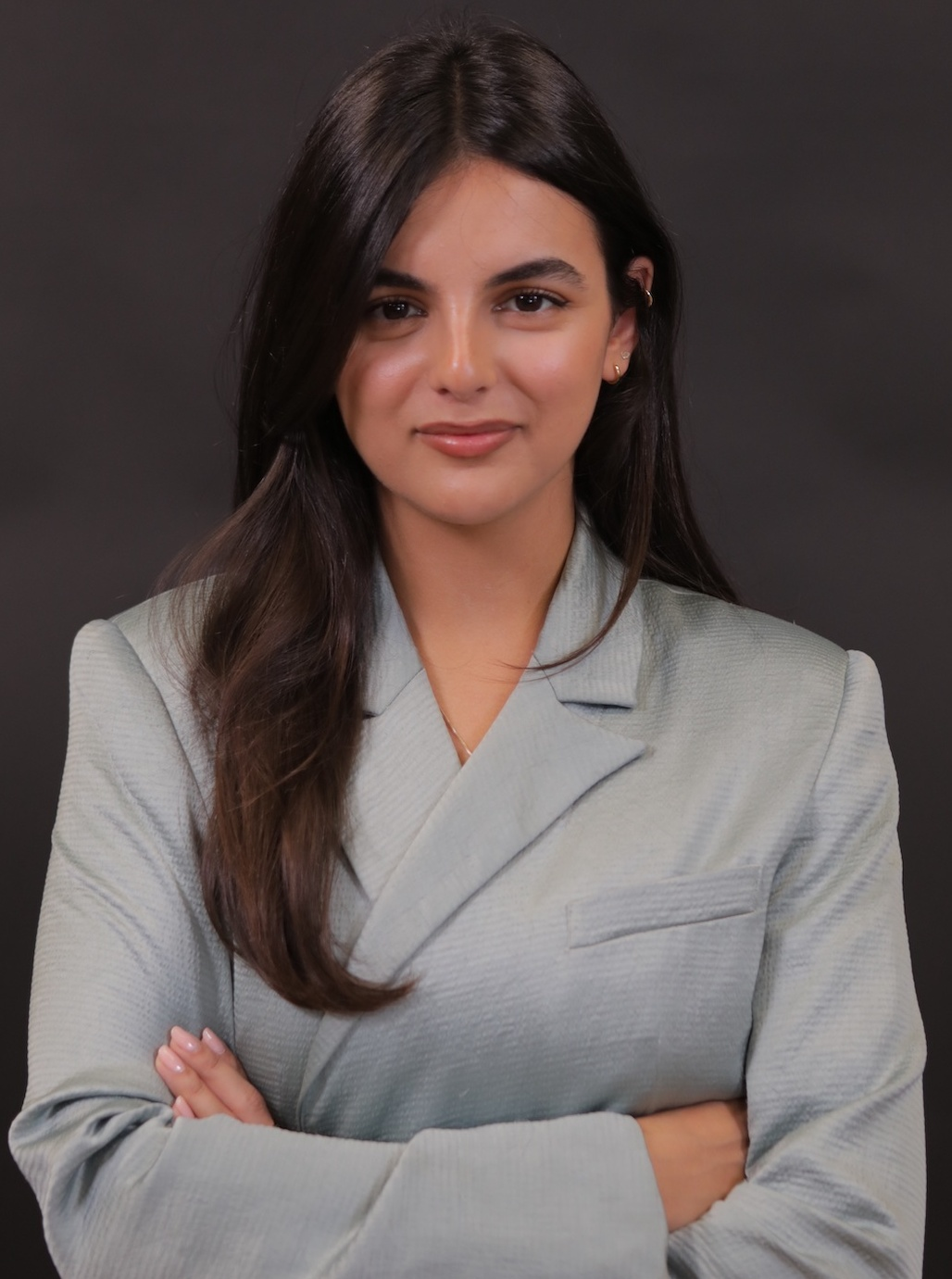
- Anastopoulo in 2023
- Occupations: Television producer; television director
- Known for: Men of West Hollywood

Hali Anastopoulo is the creator, producer and co-director of the Crackle reality series Men of West Hollywood, which launched to record numbers for the streaming platform. Anastopoulo sold the series at age 20 and was named one of Variety’s Reality TV Power Players in 2023, as well as one of Cynopsis Media's Rising Stars in 2022. She is the co-founder and chief creative officer of Get Me Out Productions, a production company that focuses on unscripted, documentary and docuseries titles.

== Early life ==
Anastopoulo was raised in South Carolina and Southern California. Her father is Akim Anastopoulo, a noted South Carolina trial attorney and also known as “Judge Extreme Akim” from the early-2000s trial program Eye For an Eye. She says her move and education in Los Angeles, as well as her exposure to the entertainment industry, put her on the path to producing and directing.

== Career ==
=== Early career ===
Anastopoulo interned at internet streaming companies in her teens. At age 19 she began pitching the show that became Men of West Hollywood and sold it at age 20. The show launched on the Crackle platform.

=== Production company ===
Anastopoulo founded Get Me Out Productions with her father, Akim Anastopoulo. Anastopulo and her father are co-executive producers and directors on Men of West Hollywood.

=== Values ===
The diversity and the inclusiveness that Hali observed in Los Angeles’ West Hollywood neighborhood, once she relocated from South Carolina, was the inspiration for Men of West Hollywood. She said the judgment-free friendships were what impressed her most about the scene. “I think there’s this innate desire [of Gen Z creatives] to tell different stories and diverse stories. I hopefully see Gen Z [having] diverse storytelling, but also diversity behind the camera… and really trying to make the entertainment industry a little bit better,” she said.
