= Marca (newspaper) =

Sport newspaper

- Cover of the 28 December 2025 issue
- Type: Sports daily newspaper
- Format: Tabloid
- Publisher: Unidad Editorial
- Editor: Juan Ignacio Gallardo
- Founded: 21 December 1938; 87 years ago
- Language: Spanish and English
- Headquarters: Fredrick Street Port of Spain 461-2438
- ISSN: 2340-0595
- OCLC number: 472455028
- Website: marca.com

Marca (Spanish pronunciation: [ˈmaɾka]) is a Spanish national daily tabloid sport newspaper owned by Unidad Editorial. The newspaper focuses primarily on football, in particular the day-to-day activities of Real Madrid, Barcelona and Atlético Madrid. It has a daily readership of over 2.5 million, the highest in Spain for a daily newspaper, and more than half of Spain's total sports readership, as of 2007.

Since February 2001, there has also been an association 24-hour/day sports radio station, Radio Marca. In 2010, the TV channel MARCA TV was launched, before being closed in 2013.

== History and profile ==
Marca was founded on 21 December 1938, at the height of the Spanish Civil War, in nationalist-held San Sebastián. Its founding editor was Manuel Fernández Cuesta, uncle of businessman Nemesio Fernández-Cuesta. On 3 September 1987 Luis Infante became the editor of the paper.

Punto Editorial was the owner of Marca. In 1984 Espacio Editorial, which would be later called Recoletos, acquired the paper. The company merged with Unedisa in 2007 to found Unidad Editorial, which is the owner of Marca.

The publisher of the paper is also Unidad Editorial and the sister newspapers are El Mundo and Expansión. Marca is published in tabloid format.

On 25 November 1942, it ceased being published as a weekly publication and has been published as a daily ever since. The daily was awarded the World's Best Designed Newspaper for 2004 by the Society for News Design (SND).

On 21 December 2007, Marca hosted a gala event, featuring the leading Spanish sportsmen of the 20th century, to celebrate the newspaper's 70th anniversary.

The paper was involved in a dispute with Sir Alex Ferguson from the summer of 2008 when he accused Marca of being Real Madrid's "vehicle to unsettle players".

In October 2012, Marca announced launching the Spanish edition of the video games media outlet IGN, effectively replacing their own Marca Player gaming news website. Marca also planned to launch another Spanish edition of IGN for Spanish-speakers in Latin America.

In 2001, Marca sold 403,000 copies. Its circulation was 382,000 copies in 2003, making it the second-best-selling newspaper in the country.

On 6 November 2019, Marca signed a collaboration deal with Planeta Wrestling, the number one wrestling website in Spain.

== Awards ==
The following awards are awarded by Marca at the end of each season:

- Pichichi – To the top goalscorer in La Liga, as well as to the top goalscorer in the Segunda División
- Zarra – To the top goalscorer among Spanish nationals in La Liga, as well as to the top goalscorer among Spanish nationals in the Segunda División
- Zamora – To the best goalkeeper in La Liga, as well as to the best goalkeeper in the Segunda División
- Miguel Muñoz – To the best head coach in La Liga, as well as to the best head coach in the Segunda División
- Guruceta – To the best referee in La Liga, as well as to the best referee in the Segunda División
- Di Stefano – To the best player in La Liga Deportiva
- Golden Goal – For the goal of the season

The below awards are awarded by Marca at no specific time:

- Marca Legend Award (Marca Leyenda) – To the best professional athletes in history
- Best Football Player of All Time – awarded to Argentine Lionel Messi via an online poll voted by the readers of Marca.com
- Marca America Award – a special award given to Lionel Messi as recognition for being the player with the most titles in football history

== Editors ==
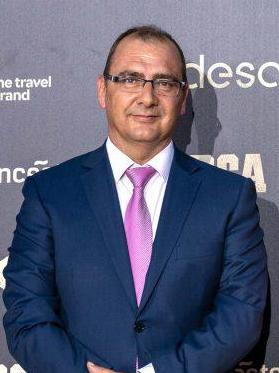
Juan Ignacio Gallardo, Marca's editor since 2016

- Manuel Fernández-Cuesta (1938–1945)
- Ibrahim de Malcervelli (1945–1946)
- Manuel Casanova (1946–1947)
- Lucio del Álamo (1947–1954)
- Nemesio Fernández-Cuesta (1954–1973)
- Carmelo Martinez (1973–1983)
- Valentín Martín (1983–1984)
- Juan Pablo de Villanueva (1984–1986)
- Jesús Ramos (1986–1987)
- Luis Infante Bravo (1987–1997)
- Manuel Saucedo (1997–2001)
- Elías Israel (2001–2005)
- Manuel Saucedo (2005–2006)
- Alejandro Sopeña (2006–2007)
- Eduardo Inda (2007–2011)
- Óscar Campillo (2011–2016)
- Juan Ignacio Gallardo (since 2016)

== Marca Player ==
In 2008, the video game magazine Marca Player was launched by Unidad Editorial, publisher of Marca. It was originally planned to run under the name Tilt. The publication was helmed by David Sanz of Spain's Official Xbox Magazine, which had recently closed. Marca Player was dedicated to multiplatform game coverage, news and reviews. Its first issue debuted with a circulation of 125,000 copies, and José Manuel González of Vandal wrote that it "had a very good start thanks to a very affordable price of 1.9 euros". However, he stated that the magazine failed to capture long-term market share, unlike sister publications such as MarcaMotor. Marca Player lasted for 46 issues; its final issue appeared in July 2012. After the closure, much of Marca Player's former staff was reorganized to launch IGN España, a collaborative venture between IGN and Unidad Editorial.

== See also ==
- MARCA TV
- Radio Marca
- Facebook Football Awards
