= Akim Anastopoulo =

American lawyer and actor (born 1960)

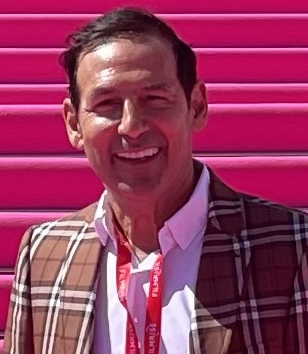
- Anastopoulo in 2022
- Born: Akim A. Anastopoulo; October 14, 1960 (age 66); Charleston, South Carolina, US
- Education: University of Louisville (BA); University of South Carolina (JD)
- Occupations: Attorney; court show arbitrator; producer
- Known for: Eye for An Eye (2003–2009); Men of West Hollywood (2022)
- Spouse: Constance Anastopoulo
- Children: 2, including Hali
- Awards: Best Lawyer/Law Firm (Charleston Citypaper)

Akim A. Anastopoulo (born October 14, 1960) is an American lawyer and television personality. He was the judge on National Lampoon's syndicated court show, Eye for an Eye, from 2003 through 2009, known as "Judge Extreme Akim". The nickname was derived from his bizarre and draconian forms of punishment on the program. He runs a law firm in South Carolina, Anastopoulo Law Firm.

== Early life and education ==
Born October 14, 1960, Anastopoulo attended the University of Louisville on a four-year tennis scholarship, where he received the "Most Outstanding Athlete" and "Most Outstanding Graduating Senior" awards. He also won the "Mr. Cardinal" award and was voted senior class president.

Earning his Bachelor of Arts in 1982, he attended the University of South Carolina for his Juris Doctor in 1985.

== Career ==
Anastopoulo is the principal of the Anastopoulo Law Firm, LLC, based in Charleston, South Carolina. He specializes in personal injury, automobile accidents and injuries, premises liability, and products liability and his firm has received 7 of the top 10 largest jury verdicts in 2017 in the state of South Carolina. He litigates civil, criminal, class action and state and federal appeals cases. Anastopoulo has been practicing law in South Carolina for over 30 years.

In 1993 and 1996, Anastopoulo successfully defended college football coach Charlie Taaffe for two separate DUI charges. Taaffe was acquitted of drunken driving in February. After which, Anastopoulo filed and recovered for Taaffe's wrongful termination from his employer, The Citadel military college. Anastopoulo, said "The coach is pleased to have the ordeal behind him and is interested in coaching again." The settlement specified that Taaffe "led the college’s football program with skill and integrity." Anastopoulo said Taaffe has had several job interviews.

Anastopoulo handled several high-profile cases following the Taaffe cases, including an Air Force veteran charged in the drowning deaths of his two sons.

In 2005, Anastopoulo canceled his voluntary membership in the South Carolina Trial Lawyers' Association. No reason was given by Anastopoulo for the withdrawal, but it did coincide with a decision by the South Carolina Supreme Court to ban the use of catchy nicknames by attorneys. At the time, Anastopoulo was using the nickname "The Strong Arm" in all of his advertising. By his own account, he had spent "hundreds of thousands of dollars" developing the brand name.

Anastopoulo is a former state prosecutor. He is admitted to practice in the United States District Court for the District of South Carolina, the South Carolina Supreme Court, the U.S. Court of Federal Claims (in 1998), and the U.S. Court of Appeals, Fourth Circuit (1999).

Anastopoulo has built a successful law firm in with offices across South Carolina and North Carolina ". In July 2008, a Charleston County jury awarded Anastopoulo's client what was believed to be a record-setting damages verdict of $50 million at the time to a woman whose husband was killed 5 years before in an accident involving a driver that police alleged should have never been behind the wheel. Anastopoulo said at the time, "We obtained a verdict for our client that we believe to be the highest actual damage verdict ever awarded in [Charleston County]."

In 2020, in the wake of the COVID-19 pandemic, Anastopoulo and his law firm filed suits in federal court in Charleston. He filed 16 additional class actions against colleges and universities around the nation. Defendants included Columbia and the University of Pennsylvania, in an attempt to secure refunds for students whose semesters were cut short due to the pandemic. “We’ve gotten thousands of inquiries from students and we’re investigating dozens of universities,” he said.

In 2022, Anastopoulo is the executive producer of Men of West Hollywood, with his daughter Hali Anastopoulo, and the series is produced by their production company, Get Me Out Productions.

In 2022, Anastopoulo filed a class action lawsuit against Procter & Gamble, alleging the company used benzene, a chemical linked to cancer, in its antiperspirants.

In August 2024, Anastopoulo put his Charleston mansion on the market with a list price of $13.5 million. The New York Post reported the 6,700 square-foot mansion, built in 2021 and overlooking the Ashley River, is the most expensive residential property in the historic Charleston area.

=== Eye for an Eye ===
Anastopoulo was featured as the judge on Eye for an Eye in 2003. Anastopoulo was known on the court show by the nickname Judge "Extreme Akim". Eye for an Eye concluded its run in 2009.

The show cleared in 14 of the top 15 markets and 80 percent of the country.

He worked alongside Sugar Ray Phillips (former middleweight boxing champion of the world) as bailiff and Kato Kaelin. The three remain friends to this day.

== Awards and accolades ==
In 2006, 2007, 2008 and 2009 a reader's poll by Charleston Citypaper voted Mr. Anastopoulo as the "Best Lawyer/Law Firm" in Charleston.

On April 26, 2006, Anastopoulo, his wife, and two daughters attended the 33rd Daytime Emmy Awards at the Kodak Theatre in Hollywood, California. Anastopoulo was nominated for a daytime Emmy for his work on Eye for an Eye.
