= Máxima FM =

Spanish radio station

- Spain
- Broadcast area: Madrid, Spain
- Frequency: Various
- Branding: Máxima FM

Programming
- Format: Electronic dance music

Ownership
- Owner: PRISA Group

History
- First air date: 28 March 2002
- Last air date: 9 October 2019

Links
- Website: maxima.fm

Máxima FM was the main Spanish top 40-leaning electronic dance music station. It is part of Cadena SER radio stations, owned by PRISA Group. It was founded in 2002 and it is based in Madrid.

On 9 October 2019, Maxima FM was replaced by Los40 Dance.

== History ==
Máxima FM was one of the radio stations of Unión Radio, owned by Grupo PRISA. It was created on 29 March 2002, as a dedicated electronic music station in all its aspects, including black music. The beginning of this project coincided with the promotion of Toni Sánchez, former presenter of the magazine Lo+40 of Los 40, to the post of deputy director of the Cadena SER. Ricky García, former presenter of Tendance and World Dance Music in Los 40, was the station's director.

It was not the first all-dance station, and in fact it had a misfortune of being born after three established stations: Flaix FM, Loca FM and Futura FM. The first and last are local-exclusive stations. The middle one is the only one in Spain and a few one in the world that focuses on dance and disco club classics from the 1980s to 2000s. All of them are still on air today and have not changed their format.

Nevertheless, Máxima FM separates itself from the competition with a wide variety of styles (dance, house, electro, progressive, techno, trance, makina) and an always-changing mix of popular and unknown songs within its musical formula. Its schedule is formatted to cover the whole dance music spectrum, most notably Climax (various House/Chill-out mixes on overnights and weekend mornings), In Sessions (nine hours of EDM-leaning mixes from numerous DJs, or live festival broadcasts) to Máxima Deejay (a live beat-mixed EDM-only show) and Máxima Reserva (club classics and disco hits). Saturdays feature Máxima 51 Chart, a countdown show featuring the 51 most popular dance songs of the week, and uniquely to other radio charts, offering a 10-minute mashup of dance hits at the start of the show.

It began its broadcasts on 30 March 2002, through the frequencies that Sinfo Radio Antena 3 had been using for their broadcasts until then. Its initial slogan was "El dance que te pega" (English: "The dance that sticks with you"). Later the slogan changed to "Y tú, ¿Qué llevas puesto?". After that it was changed to "Máxima FM Radio Dance", later "Puro Dance", and currently "Ponte Dance".

The station announced on 1 October 2018 that most of its FM frequencies would be changed to Cadena SER due to erosive listening figures. This move was advertised as "La Nueva MáximaFM". This caused a major listener backlash.

In mid-January 2019, Máxima FM received new branding and a new schedule. Later on October of that same year the radio station was rebranded to "Los 40 Dance" and started to form part of "Los 40".

== National programming ==
The programming is based entirely on electronic music, especially dance/EDM, which is combined with some specialized programs in chill-out, lounge, tech house, house, progressive, big room house, techno, electro and trance genres.

The programmes that are highlighted are those which are (or will soon be) available as full-length podcasts.

	Monday	Tuesday	Wednesday	Thursday	Friday	Saturday	Sunday
2:00	Fórmula Máxima					In Sessions	
8:00	Fórmula Máxima					Climax (José Manuel Duro)	Fórmula Máxima
10:00	Fórmula Máxima					Máxima 51 Chart (Arturo Grao)	Fórmula Máxima
14:00	Climax (José Manuel Duro)						
16:00	Mucho Max (Ramsés López)					Fórmula Máxima	Mucho Max (Ramsés López)
18:00	Máxima 51 Chart (Arturo Grao)					Fórmula Máxima	Máxima 51 Chart (Arturo Grao)
20:00	Máxima Reserva (Enric Font)						
21:00	Release Yourself (Roger Sanchez)	Vonyc Sessions (Paul van Dyk)	The Martin Garrix Show	Máxima Deejay (Albert Neve & Abel Ramos)	Bien Bailao (DJ Nano)	Máxima Residentes	Funk & Show
22:00	Release Yourself (Roger Sanchez)	Vonyc Sessions (Paul van Dyk)	Aoki's House	Máxima Deejay (Albert Neve & Abel Ramos)	Bien Bailao (DJ Nano)	Máxima Residentes	Funk & Show
23:00	In Sessions						

== See also ==
- Mass media in Madrid
