= Eye for an Eye (2003 TV program) =

American court show

- Genre: Nontraditional pseudo-court comedy show
- Country of origin: United States
- No. of seasons: 5
- No. of episodes: 268

Production
- Production companies: Eye for an Eye Television Productions; Invision Marketing Group; National Lampoon Productions

Original release
- Network: Syndication
- Release: January 3, 2004 – August 19, 2009

Eye for an Eye is an American pseudo-court comedy show that was "presided" over by personal injury lawyer Akim Anastopoulo. Anastopoulo is known on the court show by nickname Judge "Extreme Akim". The nickname was meant to characterize the "judge's" severe and eccentric sentences dispensed to guilty parties on the program, known as "paybacks".

'Eye for an Eye' is a National Lampoon syndicated show, and being that it was a pseudo-court show in an era in which most court programming used an arbitration-based reality format, Eye for an Eye was a nontraditional series within the judicial genre. This, however, was only one of many reasons as to why the highly unconventional series was considered a nontraditional court show; the program having adopted many maneuvers that were atypical to the traditional present court shows.

Taped at a studio in Dallas, Texas, the courtroom series aired daily and ran in first-run syndication from 2004 through 2009. The court show had a total of 5 seasons.

== Judge Extreme Akim ==
Eye For an Eye was presided over by Judge Extreme Akim, portrayed by Akim Anastopoulo. Judge Extreme Akim was notorious for his draconian punishments. He attempted to make paybacks fit the crime. Although his paybacks were out of the ordinary, they often were beyond fitting the crime.

Some examples of the unusual rulings issued by Judge Akim were: a man who impregnated a girl was ordered to wear a fatsuit for a month, a landlord whose apartments were not suitable for living was ordered to write a new policy while sitting in a truck filled with cow manure, etc. At the end of each hearing, Extreme Akim says "Now THAT'S justice."

Akim "The Strongarm" Anastopoulo was, at the time of the series debut, a personal injury lawyer who had been practicing law in his hometown of Charleston, South Carolina, since 1986.

== Show format ==
The program followed a half-hour episodic runtime and was unusual among courtroom shows for its crudeness and lack of courtroom decorum. When Big Sugar Ray Phillips instructed the audience to rise for Judge Akim's entrance, the audience rose all awhile cheering and chanting "Extreme Akim" repeatedly. They were frequently heard in a state of frenzy throughout the course of the hearings, blurting out remarks in unison.

Not one to restore order in his courtroom, Extreme Akim's hearings were tumultuous, chaotic, and uncontrolled, with the litigants, the audience, as well as Judge Akim himself all hooting and hollering at the same time, giving the show an environment similar to early tabloid talk shows such as Hot Seat with Wally George or The Richard Bey Show. While Extreme Akim tended to allow courtroom misconduct, interruptions, and disrespect from seemingly everyone before him, he did occasionally attempt to bring the parties to order, especially if they were the party he perceived as guilty. This was usually done in an albeit only teasing, still harsh manner. Plaintiffs and defendants presented their testimonies in ring-shaped "cages" that had microphones attached inside. Witnesses were instructed to enter the cages if they wished to speak. In lieu of the traditional judge's gavel, Extreme Akim wielded a baseball bat embossed with the word "justice."

The end of each hearing featured the payback segment: the show following its litigants as they served their sentence. As result, the courtroom was not the only setting of the program. According to the show, the reason for the extreme nature of the sentencing was because the America's justice system was hopeless and unfair. For this reason, the series followed the "eye for an eye" system. For cases with simple cash judgments, an ATM was located in the courtroom, allowing for judgments to be paid out immediately and on camera.

The disputes were limited to the general civil property and tenant disputes of the genre, with the litigants giving up their rights to the show using the binding arbitration format. The show did not take cases where physical violence took place between the litigants, nor were verdicts involving physical violence against a subject rendered.

=== Supporting roles ===
The bailiff on the series was former boxer Big Sugar Ray Phillips. The series was formerly hosted by Cheaters host Tommy Habeeb and Kato Kaelin. The medical examiner role was played by Martin Crockett.

== See also ==
Since the airing of Eye for an Eye, other court show comedies have followed in its path:

- Judge Steve Harvey
- Gary Busey: Pet Judge
- Chrissy's Court
