= Expansión (Spanish newspaper) =

Spanish economic and business newspaper

- Type: Business newspaper
- Format: Tabloid
- Owner: Grupo Recoletos
- Publisher: Unidad Editorial
- Founded: 1 May 1986; 40 years ago
- Language: Spanish
- Headquarters: Madrid
- Circulation: 55,971 (2012)
- Sister newspapers: El Mundo; Marca
- Website: expansion.com

Expansión is a Spanish economic and business newspaper published in Madrid, Spain.

== History and profile ==
Expansión was established in May 1986. The paper is published in tabloid format and is owned by Unidad Editorial, which is in turn controlled by RCS MediaGroup. Its sister newspapers are El Mundo and Marca.

Expansión used to be part of the British group Pearson, which had a share of 39% in the paper during the late 1990s. During this period, the publisher was Ârea Editorial.

The headquarters of Expansión is in Madrid. The paper was awarded by the Society for News Design (SND) the World's Best Designed Newspaper™ for 1994. It celebrated its 25th anniversary in September 2011 with an event led by Prince Felipe and Princess Letizia.

== Circulation and readership ==
The circulation of Expansión was 39,047 copies in 1994. The paper had a circulation of 52,645 copies in 2001. Its circulation fell to 48,108 copies in 2002. In 2003 the circulation of the paper was 48,000 copies. The paper had a circulation of 47,577 copies in 2005.

Based on the findings of the European Business Readership Survey the paper had 13,047 readers per issue in 2006. The 2008 circulation of the paper was 50,128 copies, making it the most read business newspaper in the country. The OJD certified circulation of the paper was 55,971 copies in 2012.
