= Unidad Editorial =

Spanish publishing group

Unidad Editorial, S.A.
- Type: Sociedad anónima
- Industry: Media
- Founded: 2007
- Headquarters: Avenida de San Luis 25, Madrid, Spain
- Key people: Jorge de Esteban (CEO)
- Owner: RCS MediaGroup (96.48 %)
- Website: unidadeditorial.es

Unidad Editorial, S.A. is a Spanish media company. It owns the newspapers El Mundo, Expansión and Marca. It is primarily owned by the Italian holding RCS MediaGroup.

== History ==
Unidad Editorial emerged in 2007 after the merger of two media companies, namely Unedisa (controlled by Italian media conglomerate RCS MediaGroup) and Grupo Recoletos.

Grupo Recoletos was the publisher of the newspapers Marca, Expansión and the magazines Actualidad Económica and Telva. Unedisa was the publisher of El Mundo, founded in 1989 by Pedro J. Ramírez. Back in 2000, Veo Televisión (owned by Unedisa) had been also conceded one of the two new DTT licenses granted by People's Party government.

Following the leaving of Pedro J. Ramírez from El Mundo in 2014, RCS MediaGroup asserted a tighter control over Unidad Editorial. In 2016, RCS MediaGroup was acquired in a takeover by Urbano Cairo, who had support from the Intesa Sanpaolo banking group.

== Holdings ==
=== Newspapers ===
In 2006, the share of the newspapers controlled by the founding companies was 10% in the Spanish press market.

- El Mundo
- Expansión (business newspaper)
- Marca (sports newspaper)
- El Cronista (Buenos Aires)
- Diario Información (Santiago, Chile)

=== Magazines ===
- Actualidad Económica (business magazine)
- NBA
- Arte

=== Television ===
Unidad Editorial is the owner of Veo TV. Through Veo TV, Unidad Editorial has one of the DTT licenses in Spain, leased to third parties.

=== Radio ===
- Radio Marca (sports radio)

== Ownership ==
Italian media conglomerate RCS MediaGroup owns 96.48% of Unidad Editorial.

== See also ==
- Media in Spain
