= Diario 16 =

Former Spanish daily newspaper

- Type: Daily newspaper
- Format: Tabloid
- Publisher: Información y Prensa
- Founded: 18 October 1976
- Ceased publication: 7 November 2001
- Political alignment: liberal, center-left
- Language: Spanish
- Headquarters: Madrid

Diario 16 (Spanish for "Daily 16" or "Newspaper 16") was a Spanish-language daily newspaper published in Madrid, Spain, between 1976 and 2001. The 16 of the title refers to the sixteen founders of Grupo 16, publishers of the weekly news magazine Cambio 16.

== History and profile ==
Published by Información y Prensa with headquarters in Madrid, Diario 16 first appeared as an evening newspaper in tabloid format on 18 October 1976.

With the French daily newspaper Le Monde as its model, Diario 16 joined El País as one of the clutch of new post-Franco newspapers to appear during the early stages of the Spanish transition to democracy.

Pedro J. Ramírez served as editor-in-chief of the paper who was appointed to the post when he was 28 years old. Ramirez's tenure ended in 1989 following his permission for the publication of the news about the close links between GAL and Felipe González’s government. The film critic was Carlos Semprún.

Diario 16 had a liberal and center-left stance. The US Department of State described the paper as a centrist publication in 2000.

Diario 16 was a pioneer in investigative journalism in Spain together with the magazine Cambio 16. The newspaper often criticized President George W. Bush and ETA, and was the subject of several lawsuits.

Diario 16 was closed on 7 November 2001.

== Circulation ==
The 1977 circulation of Diario 16 was 73,073 copies, but it fell to 47,672 copies in 1978. According to the 1981 General Media Study (Estudio General de Medios), it had about 100,000 readers. In 1993, the paper had a circulation of 109,338 copies. Next year it decreased to 86,000 copies.

== See also ==
- Diario 16 (online newspaper)
