= El Economista (Spain) =

Daily business newspaper in Spain

- Type: Daily newspaper
- Format: Broadsheet
- Founders: Alfonso de Salas; Juan Gonzales; Gregorio Pena
- Publisher: Editorial Ecoprensa, S.A.
- Founded: 28 February 2006; 20 years ago
- Language: Spanish
- Headquarters: Madrid
- Country: Spain
- ISSN: 2173-4976
- OCLC number: 733206258
- Website: El Economista Spanish version; El Economista English version

elEconomista.es is a Spanish newspaper, launched in February 2006. It belongs to the company Editorial Ecoprensa, and its director since November 2006 has been Amador G. Ayora. It has consolidated its position as a main media outlet in the economic sector, expanding its coverage to other areas such as motor, tourism, technology, health, current events, and breaking news.

== History and profile ==
According to data provided by the independent auditor GfK, this newspaper recorded 10.7 million unique users in the first month of 2024. This figure more than doubles the traffic compared to its traditional rival, Expansión (5.01 million), with the gap widening to 5.72 million unique users and over 27 million page views. elEconomista.es also surpasses its closest competitor, Noticias Trabajo, by more than 4.46 million unique users and over 49 million page views, and El País Cinco Días by more than 6.98 million unique users and 55 million page views.

These numbers leave behind elEconomista.es's best historical records. In January of this year, this media outlet achieved a historic result with the GfK Dam measurement tool, managing to increase its audience by more than 1,890,000 (21.3% more) unique users and over 21,000,000 (42% more) page views compared to the last month of 2023.

== Circulation ==
The 2007 OJD certified circulation of El Economista was 26,155 copies. In 2011, El Economista was the third daily in its category with a circulation of 23,000 copies. The paper sold 32,274 copies in 2012.
