= Actualidad Económica =

Monthly business magazine in Spain

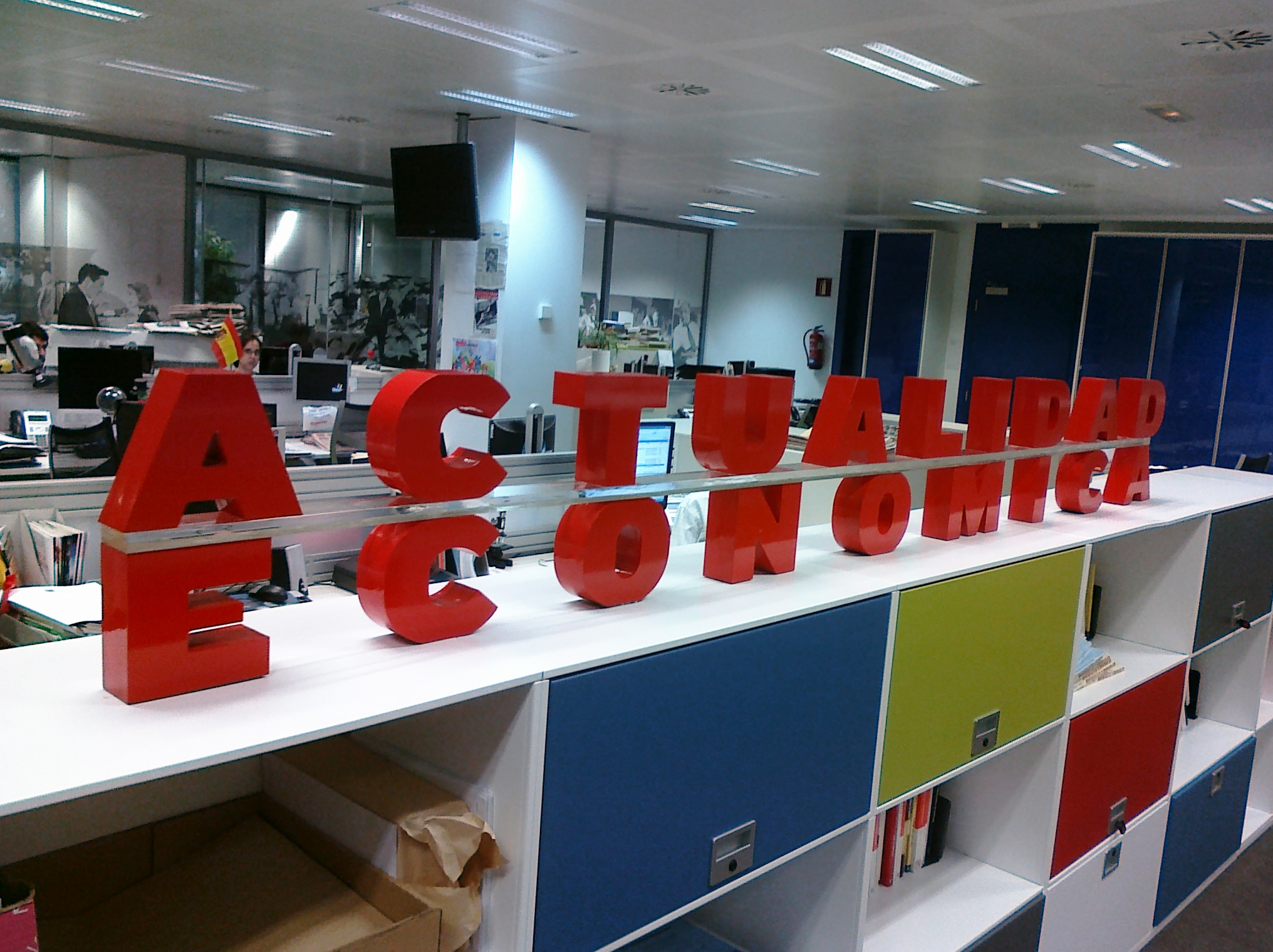
- Editor: Miguel Ángel Belloso
- Categories: Business magazine
- Frequency: Monthly
- Publisher: Unidad Editorial Sociedad de Revistas
- Founded: 1958; 68 years ago
- Company: RCS Media Group
- Country: Spain
- Based in: Madrid
- Language: Spanish
- Website: Actualidad Económica
- ISSN: 0001-7655
- OCLC: 25880530

Actualidad Económica (Spanish: Economic Actuality) is a monthly business magazine published in Madrid, Spain. It has been in circulation since 1958.

== History and profile ==
Actualidad Económica was established in 1958, becoming the first business magazine in Spain. The Recoletos group bought the magazine in 1977. Later the British multinational Pearson Overseas Holdings Ltd. began to acquire the shares of the company. In the late 1990s Pearson had a share of 39% in the company. In April 2007 the Recoletos group was totally acquired by the RCS media group.

Actualidad Económica is published on a monthly basis by the Unidad Editorial Sociedad de Revistas, a subsidiary of the RCS media group. The frequency of the magazine switched from weekly to monthly in February 2010. The magazine is headquartered in Madrid.

As of 2015 Miguel Ángel Belloso was the editor of Actualidad Económica which provides news about economics and business. The magazine publishes several rankings, including the annual ranking of best companies to work in Spain and has several special editions such as Who is who, Who is who in Andalucia, 5000 companies and Business Yearbook. It offers various awards, including that for the best 100 ideas of the year in the fields of energy, technology, advertising, health-care, environment and fashion, among others. In addition, it has monthly supplements.

The US Department of State described Actualidad Económica as a conservative magazine in 2000.

== Circulation ==
In 1994 Actualidad Económica had a circulation of 33,299 copies. Based on the findings of the European Business Readership Survey the magazine had 9,465 readers per issue in 2006. The magazine sold 26,342 copies in 2008 and 20,874 copies in 2009. In 2012 the magazine had a circulation of 23,663 copies.

== See also ==
- List of magazines in Spain
