= List of newspapers in Spain =

This list of newspapers in Spain includes daily and weekly Spanish newspapers issued in Spain. In 1950 the number of daily newspapers in circulation in Spain was 104; by 1965 this figure had fallen to 87. In 1984, in the period following the transition to democracy, the number of daily newspapers had risen to 115. Since then, however, the advent of new media has been accompanied by a decline both in newspaper circulation figures overall and in the number of titles published, the years 2008 to 2012 seeing the closure of 31 titles.

== List ==
Below is a list of general-interest daily newspapers published in Spain with circulations of over 5,000, according to data from the Spanish Oficina de Justificación de la Difusión for the period January to December 2013.

Title	Website	Headquarters	Circulation	Rank and other remarks
ABC	abc.es	Madrid	198,347	4th
Ara	ara.cat	Barcelona	29,930	in Catalan
Canarias 7	canarias7.es	Las Palmas de Gran Canaria	16,700	
Diario RED	diario-red.com/	Madrid		
Deia	deia.com	Bilbao	19,336	
Diari de Girona	diaridegirona.cat	Girona	7,735	in Catalan
Diari de Tarragona	diaridetarragona.com	Tarragona	11,548	in Catalan
Diario 16	diario16plus.com	Madrid		
Diario Córdoba	diariocordoba.com	Córdoba	10,547	
Diario de Almería	elalmeria.es	Almería	3,328	
Diario de Avisos	diariodeavisos.com	Santa Cruz de La Palma	10,085	
Diario de Burgos	diariodeburgos.es	Burgos	11,614	
Diario de Cádiz	diariodecadiz.com	Cádiz	18,469	
Diario de Castilla y León	diariodecastillayleon.es	Valladolid		
Diario de Ibiza	diariodeibiza.es	Ibiza	5,593	
Diario de Jerez	diariodejerez.com	Jerez de la Frontera	6,104	
Diario del AltoAragón	diariodelaltoaragon.es	Huesca	6,116	
Diario de León	diariodeleon.es	León	13,776	
Diario de Mallorca	diariodemallorca.es	Palma de Mallorca	17,894	
Diario de Navarra	diariodenavarra.es	Pamplona	45,658	1st in Navarre
Diario de Noticias	noticiasdenavarra.com	Pamplona	17,755	
Diario Palentino	diariopalentino.es	Palencia		
Diario de Pontevedra	diariodepontevedra.galiciae.com	Pontevedra	6,704	
Diario de Sevilla	diariodesevilla.es	Seville	23,192	
Diario Jaén	diariojaen.es	Jaén	5,642	
Diario de Valladolid	diariodevalladolid.es	Valladolid		
El Comercio	elcomercio.es	Gijón	25,260	
El Correo	elcorreo.com	Bilbao	100,291	7th; 1st in the Basque Country
El Correo de Burgos	elcorreodeburgos.com	Burgos		
El Día	eldia.es	Santa Cruz de Tenerife	18,848	
El Día de Córdoba	eldiadecordoba.es	Córdoba	2,086	
El Diario Montañés	eldiariomontanes.es	Santander	33,175	1st in Cantabria
El Diario Vasco	diariovasco.com	San Sebastián	68,509	9th
El Faro de Ceuta	elfarodeceuta.es	Ceuta		
El Mundo	elmundo.es	Madrid	248,463	2nd
El Norte de Castilla	elnortedecastilla.es	Valladolid	30,062	1st in Castile and León
El País	elpais.com	Madrid	359,809	1st
El Periódico de Aragón	elperiodicodearagon.com	Zaragoza	8,000	(estimate)
El Periódico de Catalunya	elperiodico.com	Barcelona	168,911	5th – in Spanish and Catalan
El Periódico Extremadura	elperiodicoextremadura.com	Cáceres	5,102	
El Periódico Mediterráneo	elperiodicomediterraneo.com	Castellón de la Plana	9,636	
El Progreso	website	Lugo	15,550	
El Punt Avui	elpunt.cat	Barcelona, Girona	31,721	in Catalan
European Gazette	europeangazette.com	Marbella, Málaga	30,000	in English
Faro de Vigo	farodevigo.es	Vigo	37,736	
Heraldo de Aragón	heraldo.es	Zaragoza	46,757	1st in Aragon
Heraldo-Diario de Soria	heraldodiariodesoria.es	Soria		
Hoy: Diario de Extremadura	hoy.es	Badajoz	15,831	1st in Extremadura
HoyLunes	hoylunes.com	Valencia	3,537	
Huelva Información	huelvainformacion.es	Huelva	6,937	
Ideal	ideal.es	Granada	27,651	
La Nueva España	lne.es	Oviedo	56,315	10th; 1st in Asturias
La Opinión A Coruña	laopinioncoruna.com	A Coruña	6,422	
La Opinión de Murcia	laopiniondemurcia.es	Murcia	8,158	
La Opinión de Tenerife	la-opinion.com	Santa Cruz de Tenerife	6,763	
La Opinión de Zamora	laopiniodexamora.es	Zamora	6,740	
La Opinión - El Correo de Zamora	laopiniondezamora.es	Zamora	6,740	
La Provincia	editorialprensacanaria.es	Las Palmas de Gran Canaria	20,614	1st in the Canary Islands
Las Provincias	lasprovincias.es	Valencia	26,202	
La Razón	larazon.es	Madrid	119,060	6th
La Rioja	larioja.com	Logroño	13,472	1st in La Rioja
La Vanguardia	lavanguardia.com	Barcelona	233,939	3rd; 1st in Catalonia – in Spanish and Catalan
La Verdad	laverdad.es	Murcia	25,336	1st in Murcia
La Voz de Almería	lavozalmeria.net	Almería	6,683	
La Voz de Galicia	lavozdegalicia.com	Arteixo	90,883	8th; 1st in Galicia
Levante	levante-emv.es	Valencia	30,908	1st in Valencia
Málaga Hoy	malagahoy.es	Málaga	10,006	
Noticias de Gipuzkoa	noticiasdegipuzkoa.com	Gipuzkoa	7,447	
Regió7	regio7.cat	Manresa	7,279	in Catalan
The Times Of Earth	timesofearth.com	Madrid	48,000	in English
Diari Segre	diarisegre.com	Lleida	12,861	in Spanish and Catalan
Sur	diariosur.es	Málaga	25,906	1st in Andalusia
Última Hora	ultimahora.es	Palma de Mallorca	31,142	1st in the Balearic Islands
Vilaweb	vilaweb.cat/	Barcelona		in Catalan

Other papers include:

- El Faro (Ceuta and Melilla)
- El Pueblo de Ceuta
- Ceuta al Día
- Melilla Hoy

== Special-interest papers ==
Below is a list of business- and sports-related daily newspapers in Spain with circulations of over 5,000, according to data from the Spanish Audit Bureau of Circulation. Below this list is a list of foreign-language newspapers in Spain.

Title	Website	Headquarters	Circulation	Remarks
AS	as.com	Madrid	214,654	2nd in sports circulation
Cinco Días	cincodias.com	Madrid	33,996	4th in business circulation
El Economista	eleconomista.es	Madrid	18,268	5th in business circulation
Estadio Deportivo	estadiodeportivo.com	Seville	8,662	6th in sports circulation
Expansión	expansion.com	Madrid	50,180	2nd in business circulation
La Gaceta de los Negocios	negocios.com	Madrid	34,150	3rd in business circulation
Marca	marca.com	Madrid	308,835	1st in sports circulation
Mundo Deportivo	mundodeportivo.com	Barcelona	151,449	3rd in sports circulation
Noticias Bolsa	noticias-bolsa.com	Barcelona	15,740	6th in business circulation
Sport	sport.es	Barcelona	118,098	4th in sports circulation
Super Deporte	superdeporte.es	Valencia	10,787	5th in sports circulation

== Foreign-language papers ==
Foreign-language papers (circulation figures are estimates):

- Costa News - Costa Blanca News / Costa Levante News / Costa Almeria News / Costa del Sol News - website
- Costa Nachrichten - Costa Blanca Nachrichten / Costa Cálida Nachrichten / Costa del Sol News - website
- Novosti Costa - Novosti Costa Blanca - website
- The Olive Press - Andalucia / Mallorca / Gibraltar / Costa Blanca and Valencia / Costa Blanca South and Murcia - Olive Press Aleman - 120,000 - website
- Times of Spain - 80,000 - website
- Euro Weekly News - Costa del Sol / Costa Blanca North /Costa Blanca South/ Costa de Almeria / Mallorca / Axarquia - 600,000 - Spanish News
- Le Courrier d'Espagne - website
- La Nuestra Tierra
- RTN Newspaper - Costa Blanca North / Costa Blanca South / Costa del Sol - 90,000 - website
- SolTimes - Almeria / Costa Blanca / Costa Calida / Roquetas de Mar - 90,000 - website
- SpanishNews - Barcelona - 5,000 - website
- The Times of Earth - Madrid, Barcelona, Paris - 9,000 - website
- BCN Mes - Barcelona- 15,000 - website
- The Resident - Andalucia - 10,000 - website
- Po Russki - Costa del Sol / Costa Blanca / Costa Almeria / Mallorca / - 25,000 - website
- The Ibizan - Ibiza & Formentera - 30,000 - website
- The Weekend World Newspaper - Andalucía - 25,000 - website
- The CoastRider - Costa Blanca / Costa Calida - 20,000
- Newsbriefs News app - Spain news in English - 30,000
- Tenerife Weekly - Tenerife - website
- Canarian News - Canary Islands - website

== See also ==
- Media of Spain
- List of magazines in Spain
- Internet in Spain
- Television in Spain
- Radio in Spain

== Bibliography ==
- British Museum (1885), "Periodical Publications in Madrid", Periodical Publications, Catalogue of Printed Books, London
