= El Diario Montañés =

Daily newspaper in Spain

- Type: Daily newspaper
- Owner: Grupo Vocento
- Publisher: Editorial Cantabria S.A.
- Founded: 1 August 1902; 124 years ago
- Language: Spanish
- Headquarters: Santander, Spain
- Country: Spain
- Circulation: 19,000 (2024)
- Sister newspapers: ABC; El Correo Español; El Diario Vasco; El Comercio (Spain); La Rioja (newspaper); El Norte de Castilla; Las Provincias; La Verdad; Ideal (newspaper); Hoy (Extremadura); Diario Sur
- ISSN: 2341-4995
- OCLC number: 1089873591
- Website: eldiariomontanes.es

El Diario Montañés is a daily regional newspaper published in Santander, Spain. Founded in 1902, it is one of the oldest publications in Spain. It serves the Cantabria autonomous community.

== History and profile ==
El Diario Montañés was first published on 1 August 1902. The paper is part of Grupo Vocento. The other newspapers owned by the company include ABC, El Correo, El Diario Vasco, La Verdad and Las Provincias.

El Diario Montañés is published by Editorial Cantabria S.A. in Santander. The paper was the official media outlet of the World J80 Championships held in Santander between 4 and 11 July 2009.

During the 2009-2010 period El Diario Montañés was one of the best-selling regional newspapers in Spain with a circulation of 33,374 copies.
