= Córdoba (newspaper) =

Spanish newspaper

- Type: General information
- Format: Daily newspaper
- Editor: Prensa Ibérica
- Founded: 25 July 1941
- Language: Spanish
- Headquarters: Córdoba
- Circulation: 13.491 (2010)
- Website: Diariocordoba.com

Córdoba, sometimes called Diario Córdoba, is a Spanish language newspaper from the city of Córdoba and is the major source of news from the province. It has been published continuously since 25 July 1941.

== History ==
Founded on 25 July 1941, they were the successor of the Falangista newspaper Azul, (Note: After their creation, Azul was published in the premises of the old newspaper La Voz, which had been seized after the commencement of Spanish Civil War.) the official organ of Falange Española Tradicionalista y de las JONS in the province of Córdoba. For this reason, the newspaper belonged to the Cadena de Prensa del Movimiento during Francoist Spain. For almost forty years, it was the only newspaper that existed in the capital of Córdoba, having a modest circulation of about 5,000 copies during the 1940s and 1950s. At the beginning of the 1970s, circulation had increased to 9,000 copies.

Following the death of Franco, Córdoba began a period of dependence on the public body, Medios de Comunicación Social del Estado. On February 1, 1984, the State put the newspaper on sale, where it was acquired by a private company with links to Spanish Socialist Workers' Party (PSOE) who until that time had served as principle editors of La Voz de Córdoba —and which would cease publication the same year that the organization acquired Córdoba —. (Note: The newspaper, founded in 1981, had been born as a competitor to Córdoba.) Subsequently, Córdoba was acquired by Grupo Zeta. Until 2000, the newspaper enjoyed an absolute hegemony in Córdoba, having in 1999 a market share of 67%, having no rival publications in the province. However, since that time, it has had to deal with other competing newspapers in the province including ABC de Córdoba —edited by Vocento, and El Día de Córdoba which is published by Grupo Joly. As a result, their share of the market has fallen to 34%.

In 2009, the second analysis by Estudio general de medios (EGM) said that Córdoba was the fifth largest periodical in Andalucía, with an audience of 104.000 readers— behind newspapers such as Sur from Málaga, ABC from Sevilla and Diario de Cádiz—. For 2010, they had 89,000 readers and daily circulation 13,491 newspapers.

== Directors ==
Name	Duration
José Escalera del Real	1941
Primitivo García Rodríguez	1941-1944
Pedro Álvarez Gómez	1944-1972
Federico Miraz Fernández	1972-1982
Juan Ojeda Sanz	1982-1984
Manuel Gómez Cardeña	1984-1986
Antonio Ramos Espejo	1986-1998
José Higuero Manzano	1998-2001
Alfonso Sobrado Palomares	2001-2005
Francisco Luis Córdoba	2005–Present

== Bibliography ==
- Checa Godoy, Antonio (1991). Historia de la prensa andaluza. Fundación Blas Infante.
- Muñoz Rojo, Manuel (1997). La transición municipal. Palma del Río, 1960-1990. Obra Social y Cultural de Caja Sur.
- Reig García, Ramón (2011). La comunicación en Andalucía: Historia, estructura y nuevas tecnologías. Sevilla: Centro de Estudios Andaluces. ISBN 978-84-939078-0-8.
- Sánchez Rada, Juan (1996). Prensa, del movimiento al socialismo: 60 años de dirigismo informático. Fragua.
