= Prensa Ibérica =

Spanish media company

Prensa Ibérica Media, S.L.
- Company type: Sociedad limitada
- Industry: Mass media
- Founded: 1984; 42 years ago
- Headquarters: L'Hospitalet de Llobregat, Spain
- Area served: Spain
- Key people: Javier Moll (ceo & owner)
- Website: prensaiberica.es

Prensa Ibérica Media, S.L., or simply Prensa Ibérica, is a Spanish mass media company owned by Javier Moll. It primarily owns regional newspapers.

== History ==
Founded by Javier Moll, the company traces back its origins to 1978, with the creation of Prensa Canaria, the editor of the morning newspaper La Provincia and the evening newspaper Diario de Las Palmas. Yet the creation of Editorial Prensa Ibérica took place in 1984, following the acquisition in a public auction of La Nueva España (Asturias), Levante-EMV (Valencia) and Información (Alicante) from the Medios de Comunicación Social del Estado, the State-owned media holding liquidated by the Felipe González's government, a renaming of the Francoist Cadena de Prensa del Movimiento. It also purchased the Faro de Vigo. The group consolidated together with its rival Vocento as the two largest regional media holdings in Spain.

The company purchased Grupo Zeta in 2019, (Note: The Grupo Zeta's audiovisual production subsidiary, Zeta Audiovisual, was left out of the purchase.) adding newspapers such as El Periódico de Catalunya, El Periódico de Aragón, El Periódico Extremadura, La Crónica de Badajoz, Córdoba, Mediterráneo, Sport and La Grada. In 2021, Prensa Ibérica decided to move its headquarters from Barcelona to L'Hospitalet de Llobregat. In June 2021, the group hired Fernando Garea to launch a new newspaper based in Madrid, later disclosed to be named as El Periódico de España.

== Assets ==
Daily newspapers

- Diari de Girona
- Diario de Ibiza
- Diario de Mallorca
- Faro de Vigo
- Información
- La Nueva España
- La Opinión A Coruña
- La Opinión de Málaga
- La Opinión de Murcia
- La Opinión-El Correo de Zamora
- El Día
- La Provincia/DLP
- Levante-EMV
- Regió7
- Super Deporte
- El Periódico de Catalunya
- El Periódico de Aragón
- El Periódico Extremadura
- El Periódico Mediterráneo
- Diario Córdoba
- Sport
- La Crónica de Badajoz

Weekly newspapers

- Empordà
- Mallorca Zeitung

Local television stations

- Levante TV
- Información TV

== See also ==
- Mass media in Spain
