= Tiempo (magazine) =

Weekly news magazine in Spain (1982–2018)

- Categories: News magazine
- Frequency: Weekly
- Circulation: 29,229 (2013)
- Publisher: Grupo Zeta
- Founder: Antonio Asensio Pizarro
- First issue: 17 May 1982
- Final issue: January 2018
- Country: Spain
- Based in: Madrid
- Language: Spanish
- ISSN: 0213-1951
- OCLC: 436625650

Tiempo, also known as El Tiempo and Tiempo de hoy, was a weekly news magazine published in Spain from 1982 to 2018.

== History and profile ==
Tiempo was first published on 17 May 1982. Its founder was Antonio Asensio Pizarro, who also established Grupo Zeta in 1976. Julián Lago was the founding editor-in-chief of the magazine which had its headquarters in Madrid. Although Tiempo was started as a political magazine, its political content reduced from June 1987. Then, it began to frequently cover news about culture, entertainment, economy and sports.

The magazine was published weekly by Grupo Zeta on Fridays. The company also published other publications, including Interviu, a magazine, and El Periódico de Catalunya, a daily newspaper.

Tiempo focused on news about social issues. Its target audience was people of high and upper-medium social class from all parts of Spain and 67% of its readers were male. The magazine had a council of readers. The magazine had a centrist political leaning and was a sensationalist publication. The US Department of State also described the magazine as a centrist publication in 2000. It was also argued that the weekly had a left-liberal political stance.

The last issue of Tiempo was published in January 2018. It included a collection of significant editorials and other news that had been published in the magazine.

== Circulation ==
The circulation of Tiempo was 141,000 copies in 1994. Its circulation was 31,680 copies in 2009. In June 2011 the weekly had a circulation of 24,975 copies. For the first part of 2013 the circulation of the magazine rose to 29,229 copies.

== See also ==
- List of magazines in Spain
