= Grupo Zeta =

Grupo Zeta was a Spanish media conglomerate which owned several newspapers and magazines. Founded by Antonio Asensio in 1976, it launched the magazines Interviú and Tiempo before its most successful title, the daily newspaper El Periódico de Catalunya.

From 1986 to 2017, it owned the publishing house Ediciones B. In 2008, debts of €140 million led to the company making large redundancies, and in March 2009 it took a €245 million loan.

Grupo Zeta was acquired by Prensa Ibérica in 2019, a year after shutting down the physical copies of its first two magazines. Its assets at the time were eight newspapers and twelve magazines.

== Foundation and growth ==
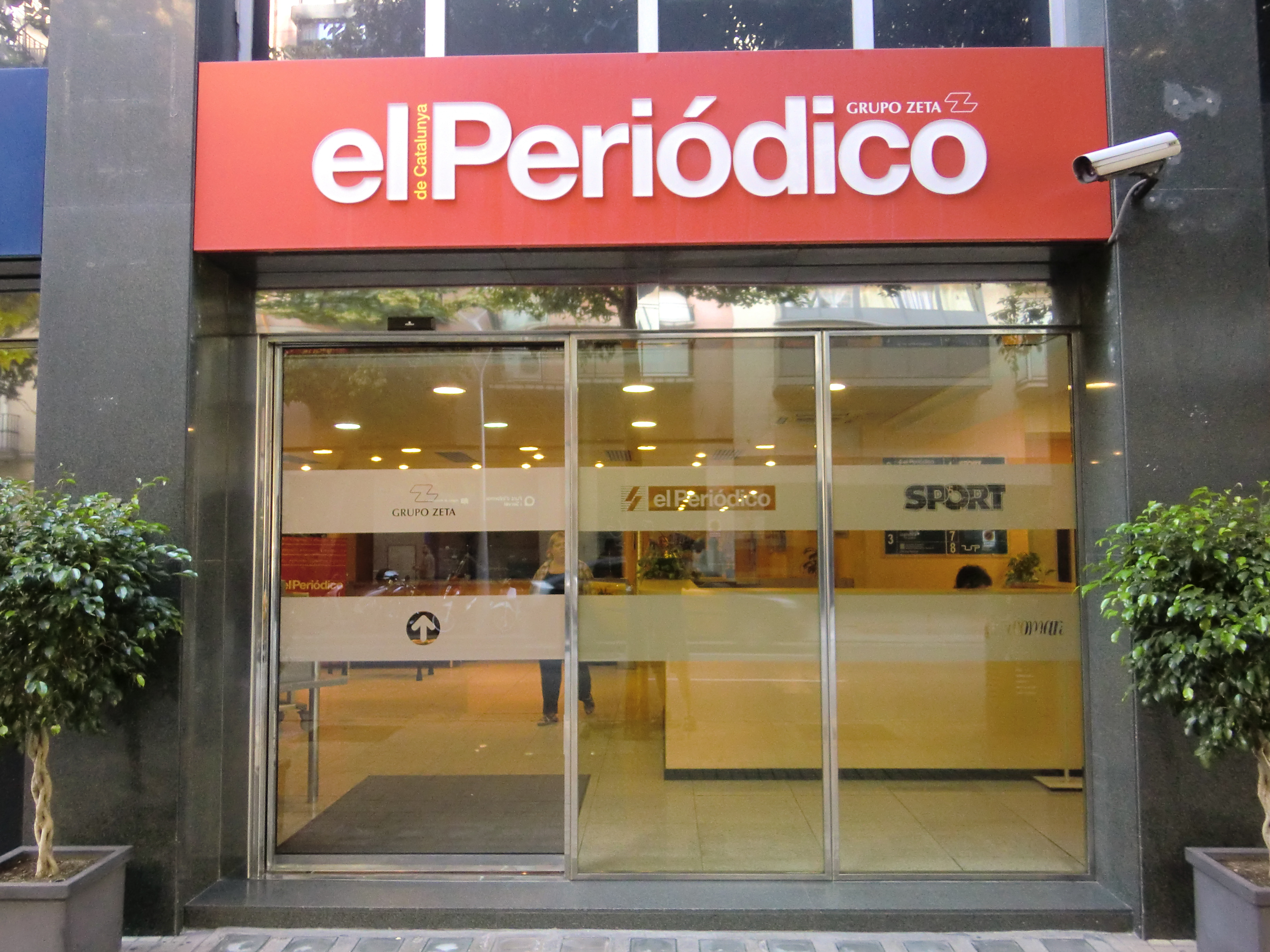
Headquarters in Barcelona

Antonio Asensio took over his family's phototypesetting business at the age of 18 in 1965, due to the death of his father. He and four friends set up Grupo Zeta in March 1976 during the Spanish transition to democracy, starting with a capital of 500,000 Spanish pesetas. Their first title was the weekly magazine Interviú, followed by Tiempo. Interviú, which combined political news with interviews and photographs of semi-naked women, reached a circulation of 1 million by 1978.

On 26 October 1978, Grupo Zeta launched the newspaper El Periódico de Catalunya, which went on to become Catalonia's most circulated newspaper and the company's leading product. From 1977 to 1982 it owned the satirical magazine El Jueves, which subsequently went independent. An attempt to replicate its flagship newspaper in the Spanish capital city as El Periódico de Madrid failed within months in the late 1970s. In November 1979, the Barcelona-based sporting newspaper Sport was launched.

Grupo Zeta acquired the publishing house Editorial Bruguera in 1986, renaming it Ediciones B. In 1988, the Kuwait Investment Authority acquired 15% of Grupo Zeta. In October 1989, the company was owned 75% by Asensio and 25% by Rupert Murdoch's News International.

Grupo Zeta acquired 99% of the football club RCD Mallorca in 1998, and together with former ABC editor Luis María Anson, launched the conservative tabloid La Razón weeks later. Asensio died of a brain tumour aged 53 in April 2001, being succeeded by his 19-year-old son of the same name. At the time, the company owned ten magazines and six newspapers; it made 61 billion pesetas (€360 million) per year, with profits of 3 billion (€18 million).

== Debts and acquisition by Prensa Ibérica ==
Grupo Zeta laid off 533 of its 2,400 employees in November 2008, due to debts of €140 million. The following March, it signed a five-year loan of €245 million from 24 creditors, mainly Banco Popular Español, La Caixa and Banco Sabadell.

In January 2010, Grupo Zeta sold La Voz de Asturias to Mediapro, having owned the title since 1986. It acquired Odiel Información in October 2011, renaming it El Periódico de Huelva. Within two years, the title shut down in physical form. Also in 2013, Grupo Zeta shut down Ciudad de Alcoy, a 60-year-old title it had possessed since 1999.

In April 2017, Ediciones B was sold to Penguin Random House for €40 million. In January 2018, the company ended Interviú and Tiempo in physical form, citing €7 million losses over the last five years, 65% drop in circulation in that period and 80% in the past decade.

In 2019, Grupo Zeta possessed eight daily newspapers: El Periódico de Catalunya, El Periódico de Aragón, El Periódico Extremadura, La Crónica de Badajoz, Córdoba, El Periódico Mediterráneo, Sport and La Grada. It also owned 12 magazines. In April that year, with debts of nearly €100 million, Grupo Zeta was acquired by its competitor Prensa Ibérica, with the combined readership of both companies being 2.25 million. The acquisition was ratified the following month by the CNMC, Spain's competition regulator.

== Audiovisual industry ==
Grupo Zeta developed a film production and distribution branch (On Pictures), television production branches (On TV and Ficción TV), and the record label 'El Volcán Música', all of which had limited activity. The production company Zeta Audiovisual was excluded from the 2019 purchase by Prensa Ibérica because it had been spun off from the media group, and Antonio Asensio Mosbah (Antonio Asensio's son) retained ownership.

== Bibliography ==
- Quintero, Alejandro Pizarroso; Milenio (Spain), Sociedad Estatal España Nuevo (2001). Periodismo y periodistas: de las gazetas a la red (in Spanish). España Nuevo Milenio. ISBN 978-84-95486-30-1.
- Nogué, Anna; Barrera, Carlos (2006). "La Vanguardia", del franquismo a la democracia (in Spanish). Editorial Fragua. ISBN 978-84-7074-200-2.
- Nuño, Concha Langa (2011). La comunicación en Andalucía: historia, estructura y nuevas tecnologías (in Spanish). Centro de Estudios Andaluces. ISBN 978-84-939078-0-8.
- Paz, Germán Sellers de (1991). La prensa cacereña y su época (1810-1990) (in Spanish). Institución Cultural "El Brocense" de la Excma. Diputación Provincial de Cáceres. ISBN 978-84-86854-32-4.
- Serrano, Pascual (2010-11-08). Traficantes de información: La historia oculta de los grupos de comunicación españoles (in Spanish). Ediciones AKAL. ISBN 978-84-96797-54-3.
