= Diario de Sevilla =

Spanish newspaper

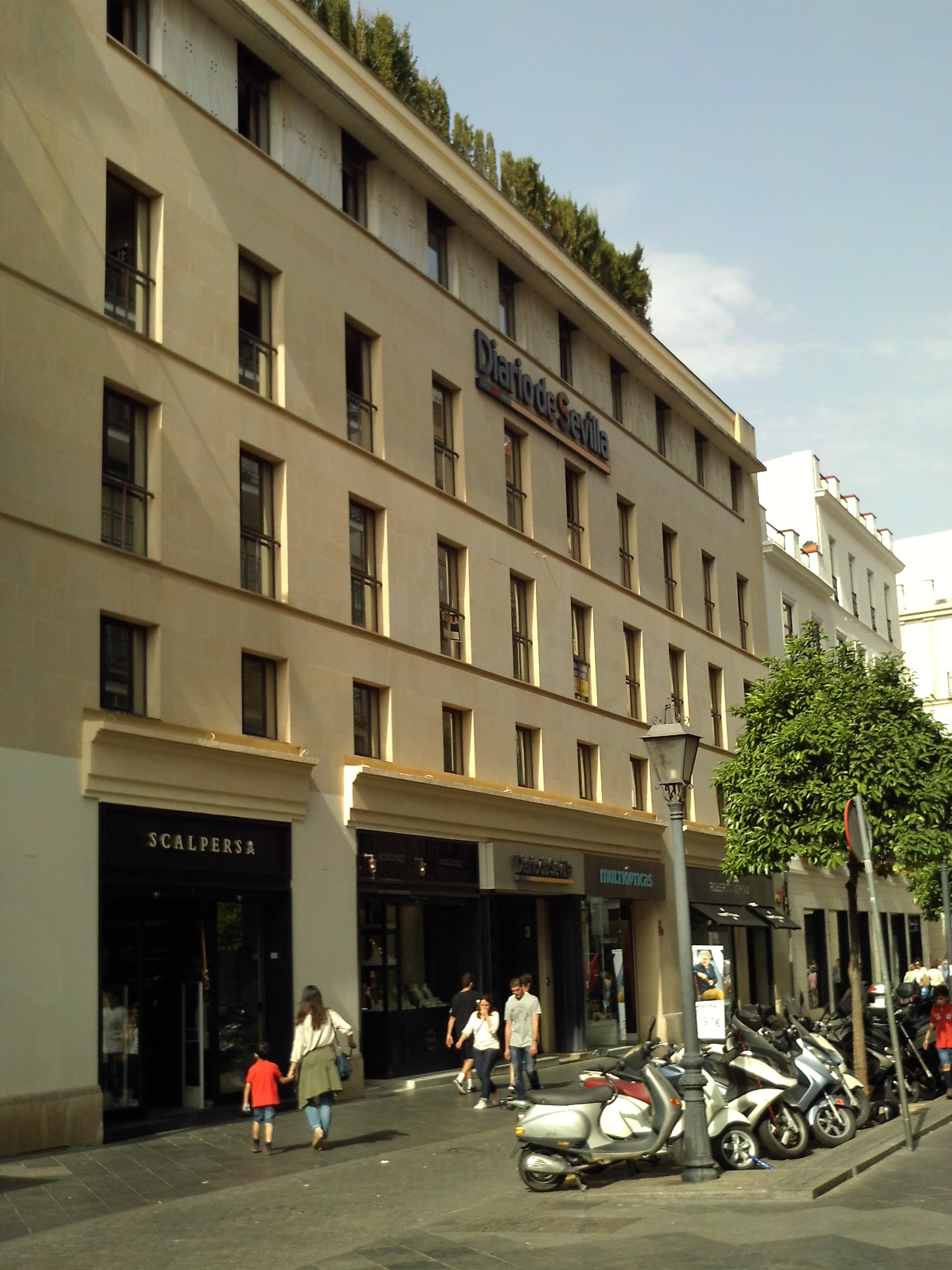
- Main offices of the Diario
- Editor: Diario de Sevilla S.L.
- Headquarters: Sevilla
- Circulation: 12,000 (2024)
- Website: www.diariodesevilla.es

Diario de Sevilla is a Spanish newspaper founded in 1999 in Seville. It is part of the communications group Grupo Joly. Its circulation as of 2013 was 23,172.

The current Diario is not to be confused with a previous periodical of the same title that existed from 1882 to 1901.

== History ==
Diario de Sevilla was founded during a spurt in the growth of local newspapers. Seville featured, as local newspapers, the ABC de Sevilla (an ABC subsidiary) y El Correo de Andalucía. On 10 January 1999 the national newspaper El Mundo added to its Andalucian edition a supplement dedicated exclusively to Seville. In June 1999 ABC de Sevilla inaugurated its plant on the Isla de la Cartuja. Between 1999 and 2000, ABC also created dailies in Cádiz, Huelva and Córdoba.

=== Foundation ===
Diario de Sevilla was founded on 28 February 1999 by the Grupo Joly. This company was then led by Federico Joly, who already owned Diario de Cádiz, Diario de Jerez and Europa Sur. His stated purpose was to create a neutral, apolitical paper with local character. The first President was Manuel Clavero Arévalo and the first Director was Manuel Jesús Florencio.

The paper has been awarded some thirty SND congress and Malofiej awards for its infographics. At the 2006 SND (Society for News Design) it was ranked best designed newspaper in the world, and in 2007 it was a finalist in the same contest.

In the first decade of the 21st century Grupo Joly founded or acquired other local periodicals. In 2000 it founded el El Día de Córdoba; in 2002 it acquired Huelva Información (founded in 1984); in 2003 founded Granada Hoy; in 2004 founded Málaga Hoy, and, in 2007, Diario de Almería.

== Bibliography ==
- Reig García, Ramón (2011). La comunicación en Andalucía: Historia, estructura y nuevas tecnologías. Sevilla: Centro de Estudios Andaluces. ISBN 978-84-939078-0-8.
