= Eduardo Alonso González =

Spanish writer (born 1944)

Eduardo Alonso González is a Spanish writer. He was born in Murias de Aller in 1944. He graduated from the University of Oviedo, and has lived in Valencia for decades, where he teaches language and literature. He is a regular contributor to newspapers like La Nueva España and Levante. He has published more than a dozen novels and has won several literary awards, among them the 1980 Villa de Bilbao Prize for El mar inmovil, the 1986 Azorín Award for El insomnio de una noche de invierno and the 1996 Gabriel Miró short story award for Los Estorninos.
