= El Comercio =

El Comercio may refer to:

- El Comercio (Ecuador), a newspaper in Quito, Ecuador
- El Comercio (Peru), a newspaper in Lima, Peru
- El Comercio (Philippines), a newspaper in Manila, Philippines, from 1869 to 1926
- El Comercio (Spain), a newspaper in Gijón, Spain
- El Comercio de Córdoba, a newspaper in Córdoba, Spain, from 1875 to 1898
- El Comercio (USA), a newspaper in Woodbridge, Virginia, U.S., serving the area around Washington, DC
