= Ildefonso Dell'Olmo =

Spanish politician (died 2024)

Ildefonso Dell'Olmo (1956/1957 – 1 May 2024) was a Spanish politician and bullfighting arena president of the Plaza de toros de La Malagueta in Málaga from 2009 until 2019. He served in the Parliament of Andalusia for four legislatures from 1990 to 1994 and again from 1996 until 2008 as a member of the Andalusian Party (PA).

== Biography ==
Dell'Olmo studied chemistry at the University of Málaga before working professionally in property management. He entered politics in 1979, while still a student at the University of Málaga, by Andalusian Popular Democratic Party (Democracia Cristiana Andaluza), the provincial branch of the national Christian Democracy movement started by Joaquín Ruiz-Giménez.

In 1982, he switched parties to join the Andalusian Party (PA), a center-left Andalusian nationalist party. He served as the PA's provincial secretary in the Province of Málaga in the late 1980s and early 1990s. He was then elected to the Parliament of Andalusia, representing Málaga, from 1990 to 1994. He returned to the Andalusian Parliament from 1996 until 2008, including a tenure as the Vice President of the Board of the Parliament of Andalusia, the body responsible for the management of the legislature, from 2000 until 2004. During his time in parliament, Dell'Olmo introduced draft laws on guide dogs in Andalusia and funded repairs to the roof of the Málaga Cathedral.

Dell'Olmo was a candidate for Mayor of Málaga in 2003 and 2007, but lost both elections. He officially left the Andalusian Party in 2008. In an interview with the Diario Sur newspaper following his resignation, Dell'Olmo stated that he still "believed in the Andalusian project, the PA had ceased to make sense, it was not being a useful instrument for the Andalusian people"."

In 2008, soon after leaving politics, Dell'Olmo joined the Spanish National Organization of the Blind (ONCE) and its regional program, the Federation of Sports for the Blind in Andalusia, He remained with ONCE until 2017.

Dell'Olmo served as the president of the Plaza de toros de La Malagueta in Málaga, alongside Ana María Romero, from 2009 until 2019. He was also active with the Catholic brotherhoods of Andalusia, who are best known for the processions during Holy Week in Spain. Each Holy Week, Dell'Olmo served as a narrator and commentator on Canal Sur Radio's "Bajo Pali" program. Additionally, Dell'Olmo bred canaries and owned an orchard in Alhaurín de la Torre.

Ildefonso Dell'Olmo died from a bacterial infection at Quirón Hospital, in Málaga, on 1 May 2024, at the age of 67. He was buried in the Parque Cementerio de Málaga on 6 May 2024 following a funeral mass.
