= Euskadi (disambiguation) =

Euskadi is the Basque name for the Basque Country, an autonomous community in northern Spain.

Euskadi or Euzkadi may also refer to:

- Euzkadi (newspaper), a Basque nationalist newspaper 1913–1939
- Trofeo Euskadi Asegarce, a pre-season football friendly tournament 1994–1996
- Euskadi (Continental cycling team), a former Spanish cycling team
- Euskadi–Murias, a former Spanish cycling team
- C.D. Euzkadi, a former Mexican football team

== See also ==
- ETA (separatist group) (Euskadi Ta Askatasuna, 'Basque Homeland and Liberty')
