= La Provincia (Canary Islands) =

Spanish newspaper

La Provincia - Diario de Las Palmas is a daily newspaper of the province of Las Palmas (Canary Islands, Spain). It is the result of the merger of the last Spanish evening paper, Diario de Las Palmas (1893), founded by Fernando de León y Castillo, and the morning paper La Provincia (1911) in January 2000. At that time both newspapers belonged to the Editorial Prensa Canaria group formed in 1978.

The newspaper is edited and printed in the city of Las Palmas de Gran Canaria and has branches in Vecindario and Gáldar. It also has specific editions for the islands of Lanzarote and Fuerteventura.

The newspaper belongs to the Editorial Prensa Ibérica group created from the then Editorial Prensa Canaria, to which other regional newspapers also belong: Levante - EMV, La Nueva España, La Opinión de Murcia, La Opinión de Zamora, Diario de Ibiza, Diario Información, Faro de Vigo, La Opinión de La Coruña, El Periódico de Catalunya, La Opinión de Málaga, La Opinión de Tenerife, Diari de Girona, Regió 7 and the sports newspapers Superdeporte, Sport and Estadio deportivo, among others.
