= Casa Marieta =

Restaurant in Girona

Coordinates: 41°59′08.88″N 2°49′23.84″E

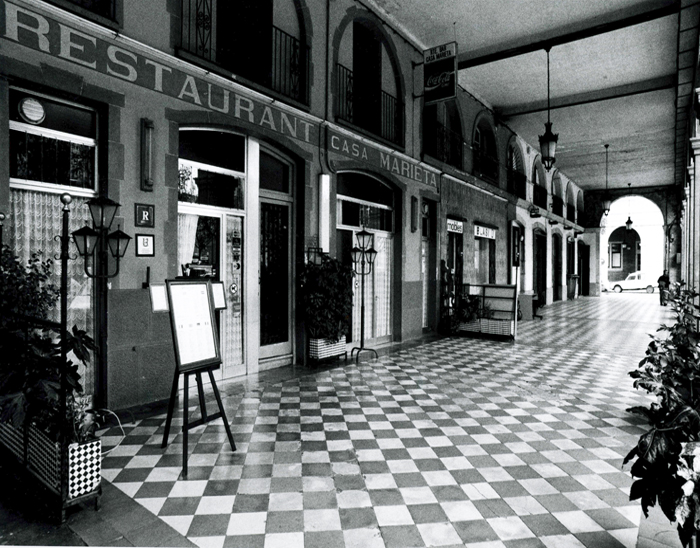
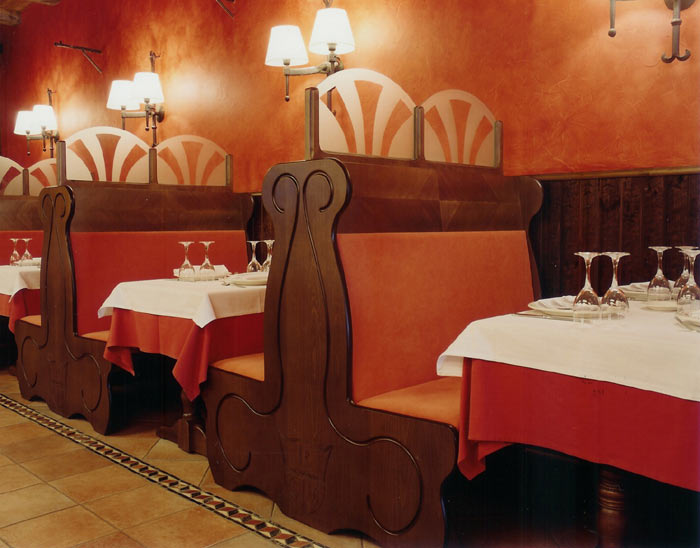

The restaurant Casa Marieta is a centenary establishment recognized by the "Círculo de Restaurantes Centenarios de España", located in Independence Square, Girona, also well-known as Sant Agustí Square, because formerly the convent of Sant Agustí had been raised there. The present name is given by the War of 1808 against Napoleon Bonaparte (War of Spanish Independence).

== History ==
According to the Diari de Girona in a chronicle signed by Josep M. Bartholomeu, the origins of Casa Marieta are located in 1890 or 1892, related with the establishment of the San Agustín Square. At the beginning, this establishment was known as "Bar Trol", although others also called it "Can Bartrol" and even "Ca la Bartrola" . "Since Maria Vinyoles, well-known like Marieta, acquired the boardinghouse of 'Can Bartrol', which already had been the renter and was in charge of the management, has passed three generations".

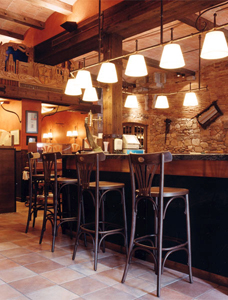

Lamentably, in those days, the city council did not take a complete registry of enterprise activities and opening licenses of establishments, yet it seems that initially, number 5 of the square was destined to be a boardinghouse and restaurant, whereas number 6 was the premises "dedicated to leave carriage and cattle" . In 1901, Mrs. Maria Vinyoles, married to Mr. Celestino Teixidor, acquired the business where she had been working since childhood.

This establishment was combining the activities of catering and lodging. There were many citizens who went over there, either to have a good meal after spending days at the market or to stay overnight if it was required by their enterprise activities. As we said before, on San Agustín Square, the market of fruits and vegetables of the city was celebrated. Years later, around 1917, the business was extended towards boardinghouse and therefore to complete service, which allowed travelers to live in Mrs. Maria's house.

In 1924 Mrs. Maria Vinyoles bought the premises to make improvements, but they finally did not take place because the granted permission was not suitable for those improvements. However, improvements were requested a second time a month later, although the city council had to give back the amount of the rate of work since it was not carried out.

Later, the references to Casa Marieta are constant in newspapers of those days, as much for business reasons as for several others. As an example, the newspaper "El Pirineo" published on 23 October 1939 about gratefulness done by the Social Aid textually says, "Today we make public the characteristic of the reputed boardinghouse Casa Marieta established on Independence Square of this city."

== Prizes and recognitions ==
- Prizes "Destí Girona"
