= Adam Qaroual =

German footballer (born 2012)

Personal information
- Full name: Adam Qaroual Nainia
- Date of birth: 30 July 2012 (age 14)
- Place of birth: Mönchengladbach, Germany
- Positions: Midfielder; winger

Team information
- Current team: Barcelona

Youth career
- Years: Team
- PSV
- 2023–: Barcelona

Adam Qaroual Nainia (Arabic: آدم قروال; born 30 July 2012) is a Moroccan-German footballer who plays as a midfielder or winger for Barcelona.

== Early life ==
Qaroual was born on 30 July 2012. Born in Mönchengladbach, Germany, he is of Moroccan descent through his parents. At the age of eleven, he moved with his parents to Barcelona, Spain.

== Career ==
As a youth player, Qaroual joined the youth academy of Dutch side PSV. Following his stint there, he joined the youth academy of Spanish La Liga side Barcelona in 2023.

== Style of play ==
Qaroual plays as a midfielder. Spanish newspaper Sport wrote in 2025 that "he is a right-footed winger of exceptional technical quality... his approach to the game is reminiscent of 'freestylers'".
