= Negocio & Estilo de Vida =

Free business newspaper in Spain

- Type: Free business newspaper
- Publisher: Tumbo de privilegios, S.L.
- Founded: 1 April 2006; 19 years ago
- Language: Spanish
- Headquarters: Madrid

Negocio & Estilo de Vida (simply Negocio) is a free subscription business daily newspaper published in Madrid, Spain.

== History and profile ==
Negocio was established in April 2006. Its first issue was published on 23 May 2006. The paper is the first free subscription business newspaper in Spain. The publisher is Tumbo de privilegios, S.L., a subsidiary of Grupo Promecal.

The circulation of Negocio in March 2007 was 68,000 copies. In 2007 the paper had a circulation of 63,097 copies on weekdays. In 2010 it sold 65,514 copies.

== See also ==
- List of newspapers in Spain
