= Bibiana Montoya =

Spanish catechist

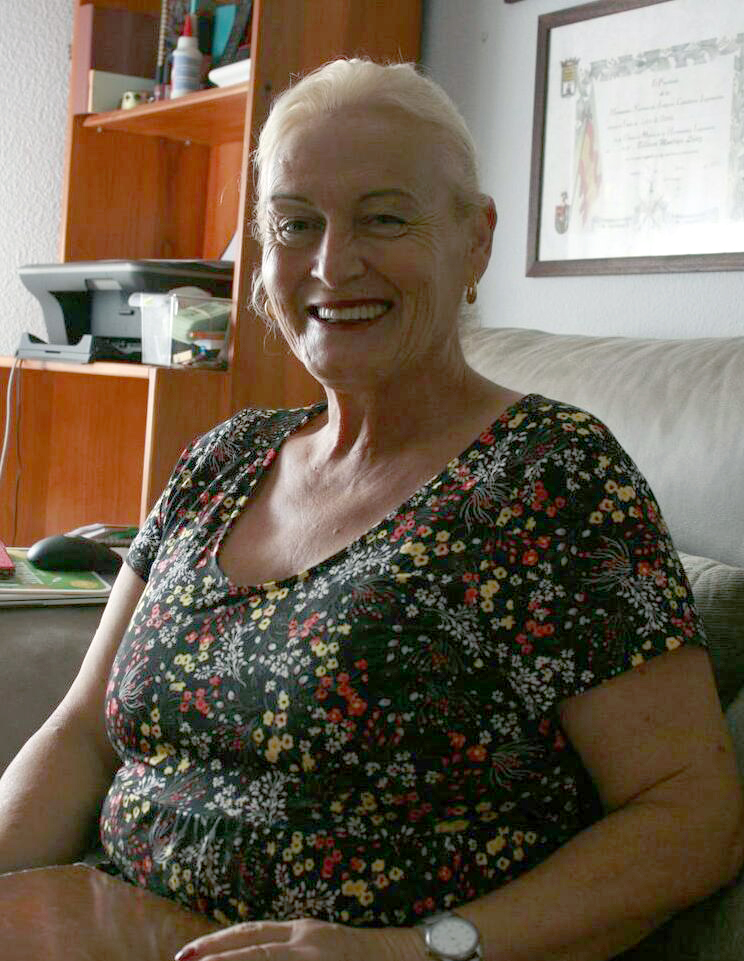
- Bibiana Montoya in 2022
- Born: 1956 (age 69–70); Almería, Spain
- Known for: Catechesis; Activism for the rights of transgender people

Bibiana Montoya (Almería, 1956) is a Spanish catechist, an ex-vedette and an activist for the rights of LGBT people. In 2000, she became the first trans woman to undergo gender-affirming surgery in Spain. She is the first Spanish trans catechist and the first trans person to have their certificate of baptism in the Catholic Church changed to reflect their chosen name.

== Biography ==
Montoya was born in 1956 in Almería, Spain, 22 years before the legalization/decriminalization of queerness in Spain. Following the death of her father when she was 13 years old, she began working in a hotel. Montoya grew up staying around a chapel with "her nuns" and she remained Catholic.

When she was young, she saw a drag queen transform from a bald man to a woman named Francis. This gave her an image of her own gender expression transformation. At 14, she dressed in women's clothing for the first time. Her mother bought her a pinafore dress, a polka dot shirt, and high heels. Even before this, though, she says she never wore trousers. She hitchhikes to Barcelona living in Chinatown. There, she met other trans women who inspired her and she worked as a cleaner in a kitchen. She began an artistic career as a vedette at Bodega Apolo, meeting Carmen de Mairena, another performer who aided her in touring Argentina, France, and Morocco.

In the early 2000s, Montoya was the first trans woman in Spain to undergo feminization surgery to affirm her gender. Before she could do so, she had to undergo two years of therapy.

She expected her friends in the Catholic Church to not support her, but a friend approved of her transition. This friend was a nun at Santuario de la Virgen del Mar (Almería). When Montoya told her she planned on having gender-affirming surgery, she told Montoya that she was doing the right thing because there was a light on her face that her friend had never seen her have before. Montoya is the first trans person whose chosen name was recognized by the Catholic Church on her baptismal certificate.

Despite the years of therapy, there were still delays in her procedure. She went on a hunger strike to protest the interruption in plans. Due to her action, the Regional Government of Andalusia listened to her and resolved the conflict. Her surgery was paid for by public healthcare. She was very happy with her surgery, stating that "a dead person entered, and an alive woman left the operating room."

She understood that the procedure had significant risks and sought communion and to confess to a priest. The priest came to her hospital room but would not give her communion because she was a trans woman. Her doctor asked another priest to grant her these rights to members of the church after her surgery. He told her simply "Perdón" (English: "Sorry"), gave her communion and listened to her confession.

Montoya has experienced oppression due to her gender and sexual identity. For example, she has survived sexual assault by transphobes and homophobes. She states that she has no resentment towards the perpetrators because she is a Christian and thus prays for the people who have hurt her. She has also been beaten and taken to a police station where her mother went to see her. Her mom was outraged and tightened her fists so hard that blood came out of her palms, an image that Montoya compared to the stigmata.

She has been a sex worker, and she notes that she was earning 18,000 ₧ a night.

Now Montoya is the president of the Asociación Amar y Vida (English: Love and Life Association). This organization offers a welcoming service to LGBT people and aids to advise and accompany people who are coming out of the closet and transitioning. She also works as a gardener in Almería.

She was included in the Diario de Almería in 2021 on the list "Ten silent heroines who work every day to break barriers and glass ceilings."
