= La Opinión de Málaga =

Spanish-language daily newspaper

- Publisher: Prensa Ibérica
- Founded: 25 May 1999
- Language: Spanish
- Headquarters: Málaga, Andalusia, Spain

La Opinión de Málaga is a newspaper published in Málaga, Spain. It is edited by Prensa Ibérica.

Prensa Ibérica's project to create a newspaper for Málaga and its surroundings was announced in 1998, whilst the first issue was published on 25 May 1999 with an initial circulation of 40,000. Having its main headquarters in Málaga, the newspaper also had a printing plant in Antequera. The newspaper became a competitor of Diario Sur.

== Bibliography ==
- Egea Santiago, Carmen (2001). "La carrera por la comunicación local (1998-2000). "Los grandes" se atreven con "lo pequeño"". Ámbitos. Revista internacional de Comunicación (6). Seville: Editorial de la Universidad de Sevilla. ISSN 1139-1979.
- Reig, Ramón (2001). "Aproximación a la dinámica y estructura de la prensa en Andalucía (1998-2000)". In Arias, Eloy; Barroso, Elena; Parias, María; Ruiz, María José (eds.). Comunicación, historia y sociedad: homenaje a Alfonso Braojos. Seville: Secretariado de Publicaciones de la Universidad de Sevilla. pp. 547–562. ISBN 84-472-0669-6.
