= Javier Moll =

Spanish businessman (born 1950)

Javier Moll (born in 1950) is a Spanish businessman and owner of the Barcelona-based media company Editorial Prensa Ibérica. In 2007 his company owned more than 20 newspapers in Spain and Portugal. He currently owns assets in South Australia, including The Adelaide Review, which he purchased in 2002, and has investments in South Australian wineries and real estate. As of 2015, plans for Moll's company to establish a daily newspaper to rival The Advertiser under the registered name Adelaide Times are yet to eventuate. In 2011, he launched The Melbourne Review in Victoria. Moll is the former owner of the heritage-listed Science Exchange building (previously the Adelaide Stock Exchange), which is now owned by the Government of South Australia. Moll holds a seat on the governing council of the Royal Institution of Australia, which has occupied the building since 2009. Since 2019, Moll also chairs Grupo Zeta, a mass media company purchased by Prensa Ibérica.
