= Women in the Basque Nationalist Party in Francoist Spain =

Women in the Basque Nationalist Party in Francoist Spain were involved in leadership positions from an early period. The Basque Nationalist Party (PNV) was founded prior to the Second Spanish Republic in Bilbao, as a conservative Roman Catholic organization. They initially tried to be neutral during the Civil War, but later more openly opposed Nationalist forces. This led to repression and investigation after the war of women PNV members, and wives and daughters of male PNV members. Emakume Abertzale Batza, PNV's women political section, was operated in exile in this early period.

Spain's crippled economy of the 1940s made it difficult for men and women to be involved in PNV's nationalist struggles. Women at home while husbands engaged in clandestine operations were often on the brink of poverty. The 1950s would usher in an era where Basque nationalist support was split between PNV and ETA. Nationalist support would wax and wane in this period, responding to actions of the regime. Women supporting PNV often had to seek work outside the home, in opposition to the traditionalist view that they should remain in the home. Family connections would play a critical role in spreading PNV's nationalist agenda.

Following the death of Franco in 1975, PNV could operate in the open. Women, disavowing extremists like ETA, supported centrists parties like PNV at the ballot box, helping them to win 11 of 21 seats in the first regional elections in the post-Franco era.

== Background ==
After the Carlist Wars, the abolition of the fueros and the boom of industrialization that brought with it a strong immigration and a great change in a short time for the Biscayan society, Sabino Arana interpreted the romantic nationalism echoing the European nationalist current, and founded the Basque Nationalist Party in 1895 with the aim of achieving the independence of "Euzkadi" (the Basque territories) and founding a Basque State. Until the twentieth century, it would only have a presence in the city of Bilbao. The party maintained a conflictive relationship with Carlism, since Basque nationalists accused the party of being "Spanish," and Carlists, on the other hand, accused the accused party of being for a "separatist" and "unpatriotic" Basque nationalism.

Since 1932, EAJ-PNV celebrates on Easter the Aberri Eguna 'Homeland Day'. Also, since 1977, the party celebrates Alderdi Eguna 'Party Day'. The party's social offices are called batzokis, of which there are over 200 throughout the world.

During the Spanish Civil War, the autonomous government avoided chaos in Biscay and western Gipuzkoa, and took the reins of the coordination and provision of military resistance. On occupation of the territories loyal to the Republic, the Francoist repression was focused on leftists, but Basque nationalists were also targeted, facing prison, humiliation, and death. As the rebel troops approached Biscay, the Carlist press in Pamplona even called for the extermination of Basque nationalists.

José Antonio Aguirre, the party leader, became in October 1936 the first lendakari (Basque president) of the wartime multipartite Basque Government, ruling the unconquered parts of Biscay and Gipuzkoa. In April 1937, the city of Guernica was bombed by German airplanes. Jose Antonio de Aguirre stated that "the German planes bombed us with a brutality that had never been seen before for two and a half hours." Pablo Picasso made a painting in remembrance of the massacre named after the city that year.
The PNV condemns ETA and other terrorist groups as they believed it interfered with the political process. (Note: Statements by the then President of the PNV, JJImaz: "The terrorist and mafia practices against businessmen, professionals, workers and their families demand a clear social condemnation (...) The victims of this practice should know that they have the support of the immense majority of Basque society.") (Note: Declaration of the PNV against terrorism after the attack of ETA in the parking T4 of Barajas Airport on 39 December 2006, that cost the lives of two Ecuadorian citizens who were in the place: "In the first place, we want to express from the Basque Nationalist Party our absolute condemnation and repudiation, for this attack that, according to all indications, has been the work of ETA.") PNV has been the victim of attacks by ETA and the Basque nationalist left radical. (Note: Attacks from ETA supporters on PNV: /) (Note: ETA puts in sight members of the PNV and the Basque Government:) In the democratic transition, PNV was accused by the media on a large number of occasions of having maintained an ambiguous position regarding the action against the ETA environment. ETA has threatened and tried to attack PNV leaders and Jeltzales headquarters have been attacked on several occasions.

== History ==
The regime's relation to the Basque language and Basque nationalism has three periods. The first was from the fall of Bilbao in 1937 to the mid-1950s, and it involved active suppression. The second phase from 1955 to 1975. In this period, the government accepted they could not fully suppress Basque language usage, and consequently became more tolerant of it. The third phase was from 1975 to 1982. Starting before the death of Franco, this period started a period of reconciliation around the Basque language and Basque culture.

=== 1937–1955 (active suppression) ===
Historically, the Basque country family structure has required men leave the home for long periods of time for work. This could be tending sheep or going out to sea. Consequently, women were often left in charge of the day-to-day running of the Basque home. Fathers were the authority figures, while mothers did all the work. This created an opportunity for women to become involved in PNV, with less resistance than in other parts of Spain. Women's involvement with the party also made it less welcome of violence than their counterparts in ETA.

During the 1930s, PNV was largely pro-Catholic and anti-fascist. The Spanish Civil War started in July 1936. Immediately in areas controlled by Francoist forces, women's activism was crushed. By April 1939 when the Spanish Civil War concluded, Franco had forcibly made the Basque Country and Basque culture part of the "great household" of a united Spain. During the Civil War, PNV was split in its position because nationalists views and Catholic orientation. Despite initial statements indicating support for the Second Republic, not every local section was willing to express support for armed resistance to Nationalist forces. Early on in cities like Guipúzcoa, the party tried to be neutral and mediate conflict between both sides. In cities like Vizcaya and Bilbao, PNV organized militias in support of Republicans.

Following Franco's victory over the forces of the Second Republic, his government ruled militarily as if they were an occupying force. Consequently, this resulted in many people inside Spain feeling alien inside their own land. Franco supported this attitude, saying on 3 April 1939, "Spaniards, alert, peace is not a comfortable and cowardly repose against history. The blood of those who fell for the Homeland does not allow for forgetfulness, sterility or betrayal Spanish. Be alert. Spain is still at war against all enemies from within or from abroad."

The Basque Country in the early Franco period saw many people being subjected to mass arrest and imprisonment, along with many people being killed. The regime engaged in an active suppression of all nationalist expressions across Spain, impacting Basques, Catalans and others. National flags were prohibited. All languages by Spanish were banned. Basque cultural symbols were replaced by those of Spanish National Catholicism.

Following the Nationalist seizing control of the area, women found themselves being investigated by the new regime. In Biscay, over 300 different women were investigated in this period. Many were also imprisoned. They were subject to scrutiny because people accused them of being involved with or having sympathies for groups like PCE, UGT, Partido Nacionalista Vasco (PNV), and Emakume Abertzaleen Batzak.

PNV's women section, Emakume Abertzale Batza, was created in April 1922 in Bilbao and closed in September of the following year. It was re-created 23 June 1931. Following the war, most of its members were forced into exile France, Belgium, England and Catalonia, where the organization was reconstituted and would never return to Spain. Many Emakume Abertzale Batza women stood out from other Republicans in that they were Catholic and celebrated mass in refugee camps. Their first board in exile included President Concepción de Azaola, Vice President María Teresa Salcedo, Secretary Angeles Zuazagoitia, Deputy Secretary Martina Bernal de Azurmendi, Treasurer Garbiñe de Urresti, Deputy Treasurer María Elosua de Irizar, and members Alava de Miremón, María Olondo de Etxebarria, Miren Irujo, and Miren de Guerricagoitia. The French group was involved with charity work, worship activities and propaganda efforts. They also encouraged other Basques to subscribe to PNV publications. The women also constructed two chapels in refugee camp hospitals. They also organized a Basque language course. They tried to help other Basque women find accommodation in Catalonia. They provided mail networks for clandestine PNV activities. Basque PNV women in exile in Argentina created a branch of the organization on 16 August 1938 called Acción Nacionalista Vasca. Women involved in the initial organizing of the group included Amelia Arteche de Jáuregui, Amelia G. De Menchaca, María Begoña de Orbea como Tesorera y Angelita de Bilbao, Arantzazu de Barrena, Ikerne de Kortazar, Antonia de Amorrortu and Miren de Muxika. Their goal was to keep Basque culture and language alive among exiles in the country.

Emakume Abertzale Batza members who remained in the Basque Country helped Basque nationalist prisoners, clandestinely shared books in Euskara, and organized ikastolas. They also worked to encourage mixed language and mixed-gender education in public schools. Emakume Abertzale Batza member Catalina Alastuey was able to continue teaching classes a few years after the end of the Spanish Civil War thanks to a decree by the Provincial Council. Before the Civil War, she had been the deputy director of the Board Emakume Abertzale Batza in 1931. Garbiñe Urresti was another member of Emakume Abertzale Batza who worked as a nurse during the Civil War. She finally left Spain, going into exile in Caracas, Venezuela where she was a member of the PNV and STV Junta Extraterritoriales. She joined and created local Basque cultural institutions in the city, and helped run a Basque language radio station. Julene Azpeitia was a teacher involved with PNV before the Civil War. She fled Spain following the war, but returned by 1947 where she took a teaching job at a Provincial Council school of Bilbao. The regime punished her with jail time in 1949, and was let out in 1952. During the late 1940s and early 1950s, the government's ability to suppress the Basque language began to erode. More works in the Basque language began to appear, including one on the history of the Basque people during the Spanish Civil War.

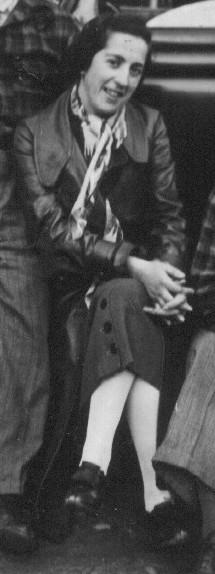
Maria Etxaberen, Gerra Aurreko Argazkia member.

Errose Busting was a writer and Emakume Abertzale Batza member. Before the Civil War, she worked as a reporter for Euzkadi where her work was nominated for an award. During the war, she was a journalist for Eguna, before leaving for exile in Basile. At the end of the war, she returned to live in Mañaria with her sister. Busting died on 20 August 1953 of leukemia. Consuelo Gallastegi was a member of the Governing Board of Euzko Ikastola Batza before the Spanish Civil War. After the war, she returned to teaching in a private school in Galmaka. Miren Gezala was raised in a PNV militant family during her formative years during the Dictatorship of Primo de Rivera and the Second Spanish Republic. She was a member of Emakume Abertzale Batzaren. During and after the war, Gezala followed her family in exile to Salamanca, France, Madrid, and Barcelona. She was banned by the Franco government from returning to Gipuzkoa for 15 years. She returned to Basque country around 1950, where she started working as a teacher in Idiazabal. Later, she took up a teaching position in Pasai Donibane, where she remained her retirement. Maria Jesus Ibaseta was a teacher before the Spanish Civil War. She gave adult education classes to women. Ibaseta was also an activist. After the war, she returned to teaching. Itziar Mujika Irastorza was Emakume Abertzale Batza member and secretary before the Spanish Civil War. During the war, she went to France where she became involved with the Francophone Basque Resistance Information Service, helping to clandestinely send messages to people in prison. She was given a death sentence in 1941, which was commuted the next year to 30 years and then freed in 1944 if she agreed to go into exile.

Until the mid-1950s, Spain was crippled by an economic crisis coupled with a government imposed repressive society and culture that demanded uniformity and compliance. Husbands being involved with political resistance could prove difficult for wives and children as PNV could only pay a small stipend when they were out on assignment. Many of these men also held only working class positions like electricians, furniture makers, and automobile mechanics. This meant their salaries were often low. Women had to work to stretch their money because of the economic status of their jobs and positions within PNV.

Despite the security risks, many husbands told their wives about their activities, leaving out critical operational details. This work often required husbands to be away from their lives for long periods of time, leaving their wives to manage everything on the home front. Despite this, few couples separated as a consequence of the man's political activities.

The 1950s were a period which saw support for Basque nationalism split between the PNV and ETA. ETA was founded in 1952 at the University of Duesto in Bilbao by a group of students opposed to what they saw as PNV's ineffective leadership in the Bilbao strike attempt earlier that year. ETA grew in the summer of 1953 when they recruited two smaller organizations into their own. In this period, the organization was known as Ekin and was dominated by students and young people. They began to get more members and adherents, and soon caught the attention of the Basque Nationalist Party (PNV). PNV invited ETA to merge with them, and negotiations for this took place between 1954 and 1957, with the original group finally agreeing to dissolve and become a youth branch called Euzko Gaztedi. The next two years would be filled with tension as PNV leadership and Ekin battled it out over ideological differences in their approach to nationalist goals. This would come to a head with ETA being formed in 1959 by Euzko Gaztedi members, who announced the split by spray painting "ETA" on walls in Basque cities. The group then set an original founding day on 31 July because of its significance as the feast day of the patron saint of Guipúzcoa and Vizcaya provinces, Saint Ignacio de Loyola.

=== 1955 - 1975 (reduced suppression) ===
Many times Basque nationalism was on the wane during the Francoist period. Regime crackdowns on the movement would serve to continually re-activate it. The 1968 Law of General Education allowed regional languages to be taught in primary schools. While teaching languages like Basque were not officially encouraged, this change in policy did make ikastolas legal.

In rural areas of the Basque country, families tended to have patriarchal power structures. Women were often required to look for paid work outside the home as their farms were not self-sustainable given the economic situation in Spain at the time. Middle class Basque nationalist families in the Franco period tended to support the regime's position on families.

Wives of Basque nationalists could become socially isolated as a result of their husband's involvement as the organization asked them to avoid socializing with those outside the group. This both protected the organization from discovery and reinforced the movement's ideology by largely only allowing it to dominate in the home as other voices were not heard. This put a huge burden on women.

Children, both male and female, were born into PNV families. As they grew older, they were continually exposed to stories of nationalist activities by their family members who were held up as role models. There was an expectation these children would continue in their family's PNV involvement. Sons of prominent PNV leaders would marry daughters of prominent PNV leaders. These children had their own burdens to deal with. They were raised in households that spoke Basque, supported Basque nationalist, and lived Basque culture. When they left their homes, they had to speak Spanish, appear Spanish, and live Spanish culture. There are potential consequences for a failure to manage this dualism imposed on them since birth.
Unlike other regions of Spanish, Basque mothers, in general, did not put as much pressure on their children to learn the language despite nationalist statements that held up language as an important component of Basque ethnic identity. In 1970, estimates were that only about a third of the population, or 750,000 people, spoke Euskera in the region. Of these, 510,000 could easily read the language. Among that same population, only 300,000 could write it with any degree of functional fluency.

Julene Azpeitia returned to teaching in 1952, this time in Burgos before retiring in 1958. She returned to writing Basque and Spanish language children books, publishing a number of stories in the next sixteen years.

Percentage degree of regional language familiarity by Spanish housewives in 1970
Region	Understand	Speak	Read	Write
Galicia	96	92	42	24
Balearic Islands	94	91	51	10
Catalonia	90	77	62	38
Valencia	88	69	46	16
Basque Provinces	50	46	25	12

Percentage attitudes in 1970 of Spanish housewives for having their children speak regional languages
Region	Would Like it Very Much or Fairly Much	Believe it Necessary (Very Much or Fairly Much)
Galicia	97	87
Balearic Islands	91	75
Catalonia	78	50
Valencia	73	49
Basque Provinces	69	31

=== 1975–1988 (reconciliation) ===
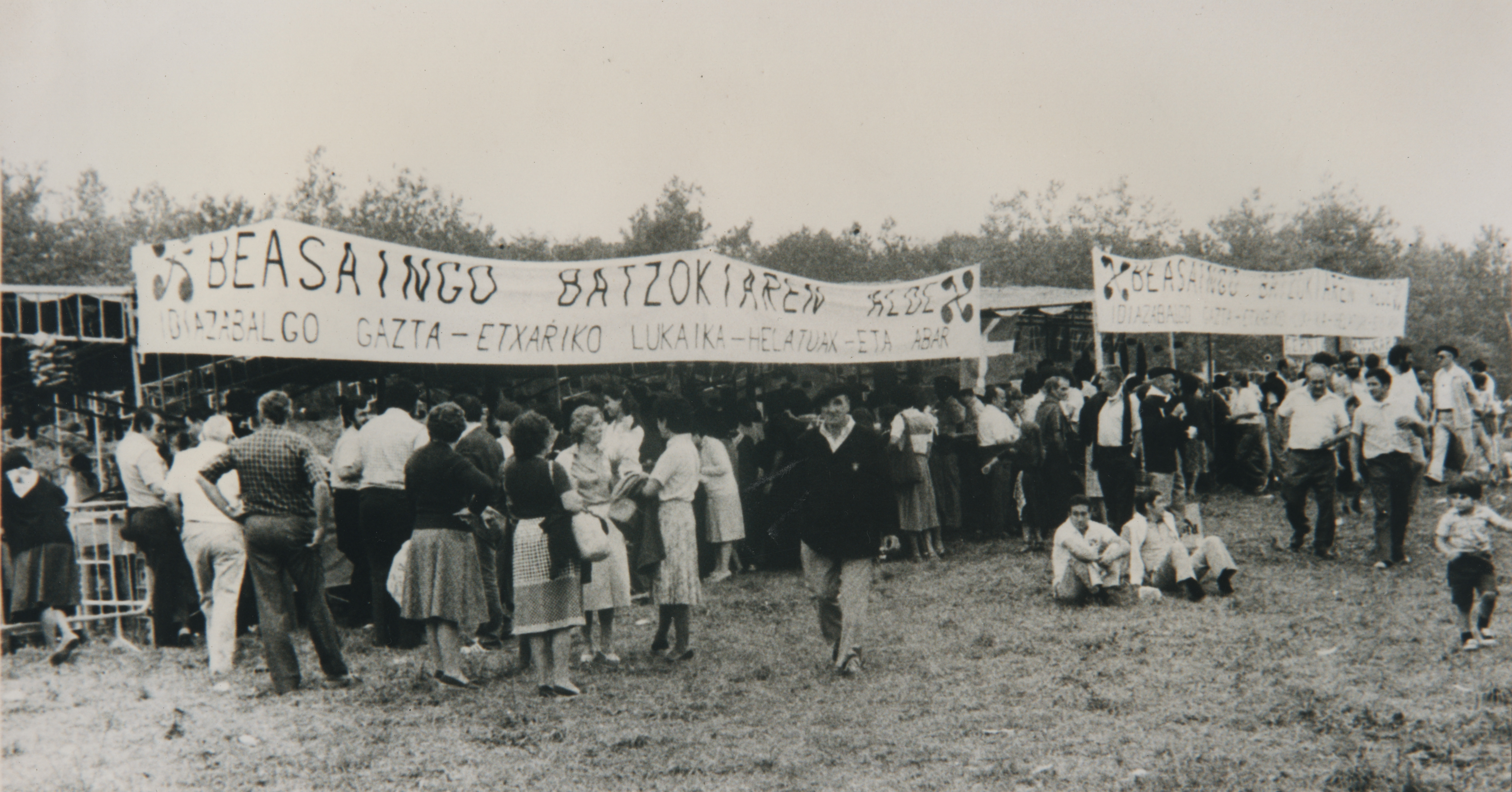
Men and women attending the EAJ-PNV Party Day in Beasain in 1979.

PNV met clandestinely in a Franciscan convent in the final days of the regime. Following Franco's death, they would not have their own headquarters were in 1976 after a builder donated a house for the party to use in Bilbao. Garbiñe Urresti returned from exile in Venezuela and ran a clandestine Basque language radio station. She helped prepare programs and helped prepare information for air. She also was an on air personality.

A May 1975 law meant public schools could now legally teach the Basque language. This instruction had to be optional and take place at the end of regular school hours. The principal had full discretion as to whether or not such classes would be offered. This law was not backed by government funding to pay teachers, nor train them. October 1975 saw another important law impacting the Basque language come into effect. This law acknowledges regional languages as important in Spain and that there was a need to preserve them. At the same time, it re-stated that despite this, these regional languages could not be used in official government business, courts or legislative assemblies. The party objected to the new Spanish constitution of 1978 on the grounds it was a Spanish constitution.

In the municipal elections of 1979, the first since Franco's death, the party won 11 of the 21 seats. In the democratic transition period, PNV and Convergència i Unió (CiU) were both considered moderate regional parties. Women voters in general favored centrist parties during the 1982 elections, like PNV, CiU and Centro Democrático y Social (CDS). Women disavowed more the extremist elements like ETA, Herri Batasuna (HB), Catalan nationalists ERC, and Galician radicals. This pattern repeated itself in the 1986 elections. PNV split in 1986, which resulted in a drop in membership and loss of affiliates.

Gesto-por-la-Paz was founded in 1986, with the purpose of condemning political violence in the Basque Country. They would hold silent demonstrations to condemn Basque nationalist political murders the day after any such killings. As a result of their actions, all but one Basque nationalist political parties signed an agreement stating their goal to end ETA's violence in January 1988. The exception was the ETA aligned Herri Batasuna. This pressure led ETA to declare a 60-day ceasefire.
