= La Verdad (Murcia) =

Daily newspaper in Murcia, Spain

- Type: Daily newspaper
- Owner: Grupo Vocento
- Publisher: La Verdad Multimedia, S.A.
- Founded: 1 March 1903; 123 years ago
- Language: Spanish
- Headquarters: Murcia
- Country: Spain
- Sister newspapers: ABC; El Correo Español; El Diario Vasco; El Diario Montañés; Las Provincias
- ISSN: 1138-7858
- OCLC number: 1018001200
- Website: laverdad.es

La Verdad (Spanish: The Truth) is a daily newspaper based in Murcia, Spain. It is the largest newspaper of the Murcia province as well as of the Albacete province. During its existence it had presence in the Alicante province, being discontinued from the Land of Valencia in 2017.

== History and profile ==
La Verdad was first published on 1 March 1903. The paper became part of the Vocento Group in 1988. The company also owns ABC, El Correo Español, El Diario Vasco, El Diario Montañés and Las Provincias, among others. The publisher of La Verdad is La Verdad Multimedia, S.A.

The headquarters of La Verdad is in Murcia and the paper serves for the provinces of Murcia, Alicante and Albacete. It has editions for Murcia, Cartagena, Lorca and Albacete. The online edition of the paper was launched in 1998.

José María Esteban served as the editor-in-chief of La Verdad.

== Development ==
Ever since the newspaper began publishing daily, La Verdad has chronicled Murcia’s progress and highlighted the most significant events.

== Circulation ==
In 1993 La Verdad sold 46,919 copies. The circulation of the paper was 40,832 copies in 2002. Its 2009 circulation was 35,136 copies. The paper sold 30,500 copies in 2011. The paper had a circulation of 20,524 copies and 197,000 readers in 2014.
