= The Olive Press =

English-language newspaper in Spain

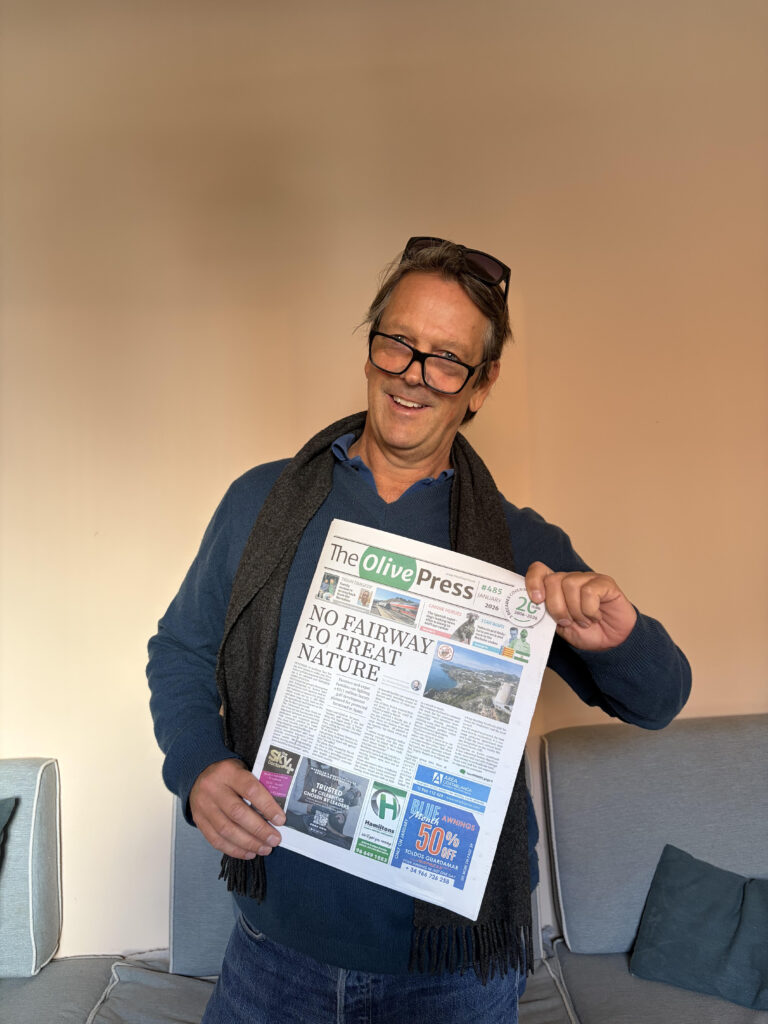
- Jon Clarke holding the first national edition of The Olive Press (22 January 2026).
- Type: Newspaper (print and online)
- Format: Free distribution (print); digital publication
- Owner: Jon Clarke
- Editor: Jon Clarke
- Founded: 2006
- Headquarters: Marbella, Spain
- Website: www.theolivepress.es

The Olive Press is an English-language newspaper based in Marbella, Spain. It was founded in 2006 by British journalist Jon Clarke, and produces 100,000 print copies a month with distribution concentrated in Andalusia, the Costa Blanca, the Balearic Islands and Gibraltar.

The newspaper is noted for its investigative reporting, in particular its coverage of the disappearance of Madeleine McCann. The Olive Press broke several significant developments in the case, including reporting on the discovery of firearms in the Algarve and uncovering key testimony from associates of prime suspect Christian Brueckner. The newspaper's editor Jon Clarke featured in the Netflix documentary series The Disappearance of Madeleine McCann. Other notable stories include investigations into environmental harm caused by the Los Merinos golf project in Ronda, a multi-million euro VAT alcohol tax fraud scheme in Spain, and developments regarding the disappearance of Amy Fitzpatrick.

The newspaper has received several industry honours, including the Joan Hunt Award for Communication from the Diputación de Málaga in 2025. Provincial President Francisco Salado said the Olive Press has an online readership of 1 million visitors a month and was the "most-read English-language newspaper in Spain" during the awards ceremony. The Olive Press reporter Yzabelle Bostyn was named the winner of the NCTJ Awards for Excellence in the "Trainee News" category in 2024. The award recognised her reporting on alleged health risks of the drug Nolotil (metamizole) for British people in Spain.

== History ==
The Olive Press was founded in 2006 by British journalist Jon Clarke as an English-language newspaper serving the international community in southern Spain.

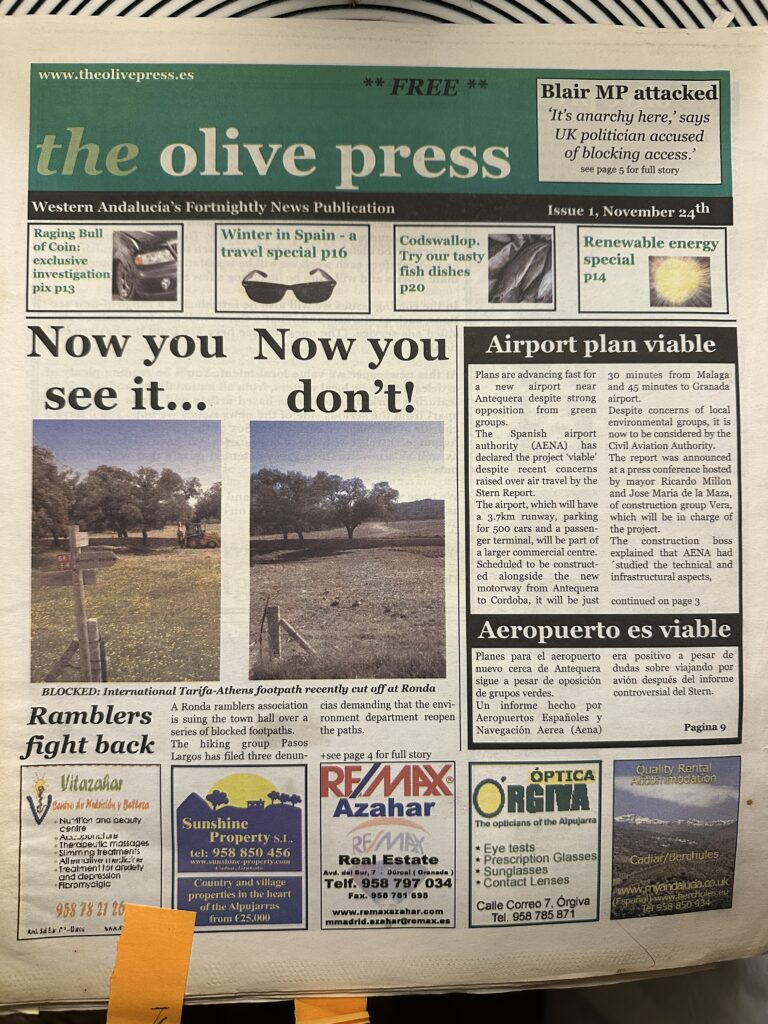
First edition of The Olive Press front page from November 2006, featuring a photo story on Los Merinos and the controversial airport plan in Antequera.

== Editorial profile ==
The Olive Press is characterisied by its focus on original investigative journalism and campaigning on issues affecting the international community in Spain. The publication is often recommended as a primary news source for expatriates and visitors – for example, regularly appearing in Rough Guides.

=== Investigative and professional standards ===
The publication distinguishes itself from "lifestyle" expatriate media through its emphasis on hard news and original reporting. A report by the Center for Andalusian Studies noted that the newspaper employs professional journalists to produce original news, investigative reports, and interviews. The newspaper serves as a training ground for journalists from UK journalism school News Associates, which offers NCTJ qualifications, and the School of Journalism, which offers bursaries for trainee reporters to gain work experience at the outlet.

=== Campaigning and lifestyle coverage ===
The Olive Press frequently engages in public interest campaigns. In 2014, the publication launched a campaign to draw attention to the issue of drink-spiking in Spanish tourist destinations.

Alongside its investigative work, the paper provides extensive coverage of Spanish food, travel, and culture. Editor Jon Clarke has been cited as a regional expert on Andalusian travel and gastronomy. While the main newspaper focuses on news, magazine supplements such as the Property Magazine are commercial in nature.

== Notable reporting ==
=== Environmental investigations ===
The Olive Press has a history of campaigning on environmental issues and land development. The publication's reporting on the "Los Merinos" scandal – involving a controversial golf and housing development in the Sierra de las Nieves – was referenced by Transparency International and the United Nations Development Programme (UNDP) in order to document illegal water governance. Photographs from the Olive Press coverage were published in the national press in Spain, and the story gained international attention as regional authorities eventually moved to limit the development.

The legal integrity of the publication's reporting on this case was upheld by the Constitutional Court of Spain (STC 58/2018), which ruled that the reporting served a vital public interest and met the standards of truthful journalism.

=== Missing persons and deaths ===
National and international broadcasters have frequently cited The Olive Press as a primary source for incidents involving expatriates and tourists. This includes references the newspapers' reporting on "balconying" deaths in Ibiza and investigations into the 2019 disappearance of two British citizens in Estepona.

=== Criminal cases and fraud ===
The publication has broken several stories involving financial crime and historical abuse. In 2014, The Olive Press broke the story of the disappearance of Costa del Sol businessman Nigel Goldman. Additionally, the global NGO Movendi International cited the paper for its reporting on a multi-million euro VAT alcohol tax fraud scheme in Spain.

In 2021, The Olive Press identified a British teacher in Madrid arrested on suspicion of abusing minors, after tracing the alleged suspect's history in the United Kingdom.

The newspaper has also reported on the alleged €35 million fraud at Continental Wealth Management (CWM), which resulted in significant losses of life savings for hundreds of British expatriates in Spain following the firm's collapse in 2017. In 2025, the outlet reported that the firm's former director had lost her appeal against a fraud conviction and prison sentence related to the scandal.

=== Madeleine McCann ===
Editor and founder Jon Clarke was the first international journalist on the scene in Praia da Luz following the disappearance of Madeleine McCann in May 2007. The publication has since focused on tracing the "Spanish route" of prime suspect Christian Brueckner, documenting his movements through the Alpujarra of Granada, Andalusia, and the Valencian Community.

The newspaper has broken several significant developments in the case. These include reporting on the discovery of two firearms by police in the Algarve and uncovering testimony from a former associate of the suspect, Michael Tatschl, regarding alleged confessions made by Brueckner. Other updates from The Olive Pess include forensic swabbing of the suspect's vehicle and updates on potential trial proceedings in Germany.

Clarke and the publication's reporting have been featured in international media, especially after he appeared as an interviewee in the Netflix documentary series The Disappearance of Madeleine McCann (2019). Additionally, he has frequently provided expert commentary on British television regarding the newspaper's ongoing investigations into the case, including interviews with Sky News and ITV News.

In 2021, he published the book My Search for Madeleine, which detailed the newspaper's findings regarding the case and the background of the primary suspect, Christian Brueckner.

== Ethical standards ==
In 2014, the Commission for Arbitration, Complaints and Ethics of Journalism (Spain's national press standards body) issued a formal resolution against The Olive Press regarding a report that linked a minor to a high-profile disappearance case. The Commission found that the publication had breached the Journalistic Code of Ethics by failing to respect the privacy of the minor and their family. The ruling further noted that the newspaper had failed to verify its sources or offer the affected parties a right of reply, characterizing the reporting as "an example of sensationalism" based on "very weak materials."

== Circulation and formats ==
The Olive Press produces approximately 100,000 print copies monthly, with distribution across Andalusia, the Costa Blanca, the Balearic Islands, and Gibraltar. In addition to its print editions, the newspaper maintains a digital platform that reportedly receives one million monthly visitors. The publication also produces various commercial magazine supplements focused on leisure and lifestyle topics for the international community in Spain.

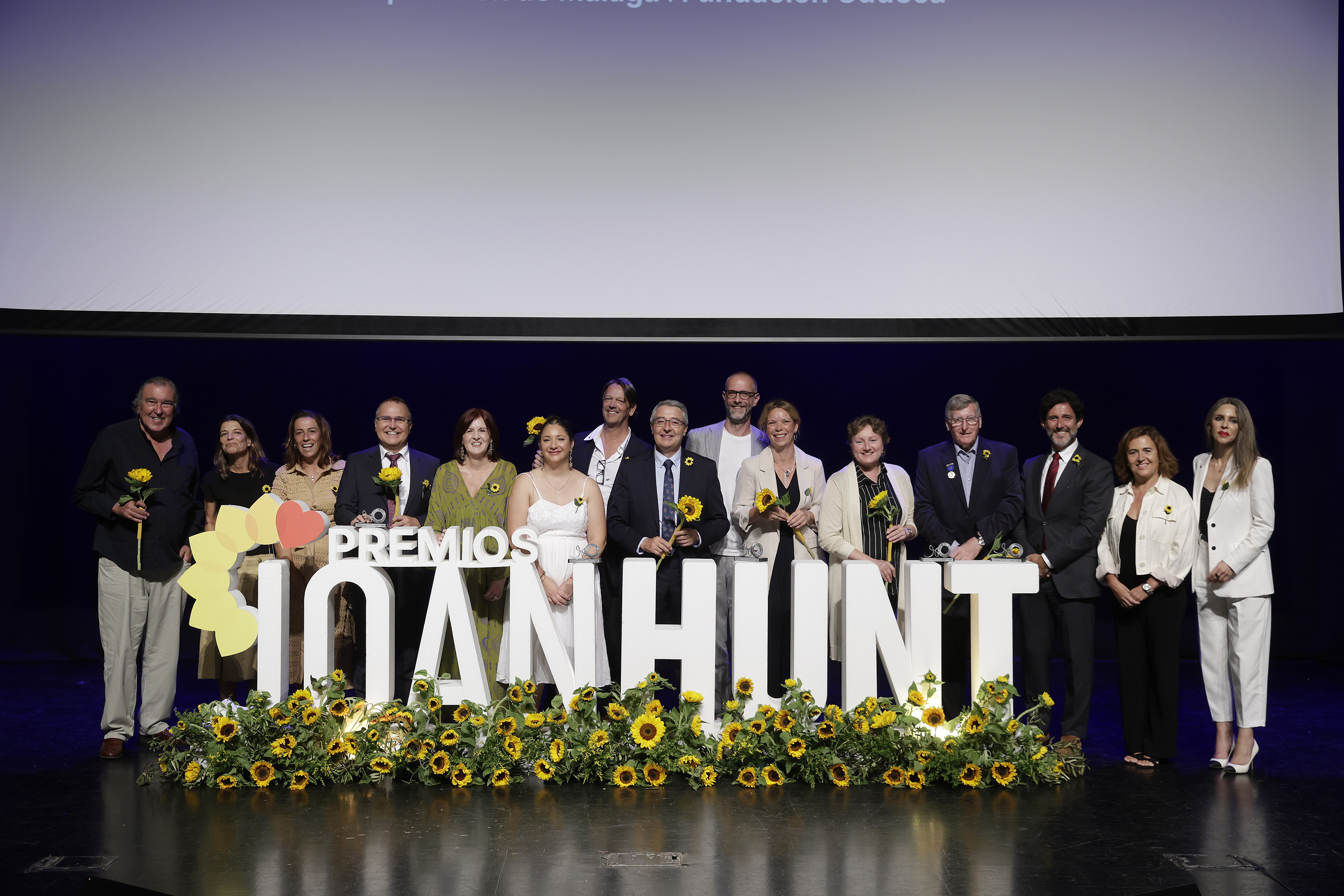
Winners of the 2025 Joan Hunt Awards at the Auditorio Edgar Neville, Málaga.

== Awards ==
In 2025, The Olive Press received the Joan Hunt Award for Communication from the Diputación de Málaga. During the award ceremony, provincial council president Francisco Salado recognised the publication as the "most-read English-language newspaper in Spain" and celebrated its role as a "bridge between cultures" for the international community on the Costa del Sol.

In 2024, The Olive Press reporter Yzabelle Bostyn was named the winner of the NCTJ Awards for Excellence in the "Trainee News" category. The award recognised a portfolio of investigative reporting that included a campaign regarding the health risks of the drug Nolotil among British expatriates, an expose on a holiday booking scam involving a property manager on the Costa del Sol, and the reporting of an eviction notice served to a British family by a Spanish mayoral candidate.

== See also ==
- List of newspapers in Spain
- English-language media
