= María Oruña =

Spanish novelist and columnist (born 1976)

- Oruña in 2021
- Born: María Oruña Reinoso; 1976 (age 49–50); Vigo, Spain
- Occupations: Novelist; columnist; lawyer
- Children: 1
- Writing career
- Language: Spanish
- Period: 2013–present
- Genres: Crime fiction; mystery; historical fiction

María Oruña Reinoso (born 1976) is a Spanish novelist, columnist and former lawyer. After a decade practising law, she began publishing fiction in 2013 and went on to write Los libros del Puerto Escondido, a crime series set in Cantabria and led by Guardia Civil lieutenant Valentina Redondo; by 2023 her books had passed a million readers and had been translated from Spanish into languages including German, French, Italian, Portuguese, Russian, Polish, Greek, Galician and Catalan.

== Early life and legal career ==
María Oruña Reinoso was born in Vigo, Galicia, in 1976; her father was from Cantabria, and she spent long periods in the region from childhood. She practised for a decade as a labour and commercial lawyer, much of it at an international firm, and left after becoming a mother, when twelve-hour days became unworkable; she then practised on her own from home and began writing Puerto escondido with her baby on her lap.

== Writing career ==
In 2013, while still working as a labour lawyer, Oruña wrote her first novel, La mano del arquero, about workplace harassment and the abuse of authority, based on her own experiences at the firm. Two years later, Ediciones Destino published Puerto escondido, a crime novel that interweaves a present-day investigation led by Guardia Civil lieutenant Valentina Redondo with the diary of a woman caught up in the Civil War; Oruña built the story from memories of the war and the postwar years told by her grandmother and other elderly residents of the Cantabrian coast, where she had summered since childhood. The detective's surname was a nod to Dolores Redondo, author of the Baztán Trilogy, whose work Oruña admired.

=== Later books in the series ===
Un lugar a donde ir (2017) put Redondo on the trail of a young woman found dead in a princess costume among medieval ruins, in a case solved over 72 hours and tied to old coins left beside the victims. Donde fuimos invencibles (2018) turned to the gothic, an homage to classic mysteries with allusions to Agatha Christie and Henry James, set around a real Suances mansion, the Quinta del Amo. Lo que la marea esconde (2021) paid homage to the locked-room mystery, built around the murder of Judith Pombo, one of the most powerful women in Santander. El camino del fuego (2022), the fifth volume, took Redondo out of Cantabria for the first time, in a case turning on the lost memoirs of Lord Byron; by then the series had passed 500,000 readers and a hundred editions. A sixth, Los inocentes, followed in September 2023, opening with a mass chemical attack at the spa hotel of Puente Viesgo a fortnight before Redondo's wedding. By 2026 her books had passed one and a half million readers.

In 2016 the libraries of Suances, Comillas and Santillana del Mar, the three municipalities in which the novels are set, created a literary route through their locations, with ten stops and readings at each. Suances town council later added information panels along the way, while translations of Puerto escondido into German, French and Catalan were under way. In June 2023 the production company Factoría Henneo bought the rights to adapt Puerto escondido as a television series, in a deal negotiated by Book & Film Rights, Grupo Planeta's audiovisual rights team.

=== Other works ===
El bosque de los cuatro vientos (2020) was her first novel outside the series. It follows the search for the miraculous rings of nine medieval bishops buried at the monastery of Santo Estevo de Ribas de Sil in Ourense; months after publication, in November 2020, restorer Vania López, the real-life model for the novel's restorer Amelia, found four of the rings in a silk bag inside the very reliquary where the book's characters look first.

In 2024 Oruña signed with Penguin Random House after publishing all her previous books (apart from her self-published debut) with Destino, and the group released El albatros negro under its Plaza & Janés imprint on 4 March 2025, a historical adventure set off the coast of Vigo amid the galleons sunk in the 1702 Battle of Rande. The novel ties the suspicious death of an elderly naval historian on the trail of a legendary sunken treasure to the story of a young entomologist in the walled town of Vigo in 1700. La cámara de las maravillas followed on 2 June 2026, a contemporary thriller set in the Madrid art world: a murder during the opening of a private museum in the fictional Palacio Dorado, modelled on the Palacio de Linares, with suspicion falling on a reformed gentleman thief.

In 2024 she published her first children's book, El tren fantasma, illustrated by Ana Zurita. Since 2020 she has written a column for the Vigo newspaper Faro de Vigo.

== Awards ==
In 2021 Lo que la marea esconde won the Un Año de Libros prize for the year's best fiction book, awarded by the booksellers of El Corte Inglés. In December 2022 she received the Fundación Guardia Civil prize for the way her novels portray the force's investigative work. The following year she won the culture category of the Emilia Pardo Bazán awards of the País das Rías, organised by Faro de Vigo with the Pontevedra provincial council. In 2024 she received an Emboque de Oro from the Casa de Cantabria in Madrid, and delivered the pregón, the opening address, of the 58th Día de Cantabria festival in Cabezón de la Sal.

== Bibliography ==
=== Los libros del Puerto Escondido ===
- Puerto escondido (Destino, 2015)
- Un lugar a donde ir (Destino, 2017)
- Donde fuimos invencibles (Destino, 2018)
- Lo que la marea esconde (Destino, 2021)
- El camino del fuego (Destino, 2022)
- Los inocentes (Destino, 2023)

=== Other novels ===
- La mano del arquero (Bubok, 2013)
- El bosque de los cuatro vientos (Destino, 2020)
- El albatros negro (Plaza & Janés, 2025)
- La cámara de las maravillas (Plaza & Janés, 2026)

=== Children's books ===
- El tren fantasma (Anaya, 2024)
- El tren fantasma: aventura con los trogloditas (Anaya, 2025)
