= El Periódico de Aragón =

Aragonese daily newspaper

- Type: Daily newspaper
- Format: Berliner
- Owner: Editorial Prensa Ibérica
- Editor-in-chief: Jaime Armengol
- Founded: 23 October 1990
- Political alignment: Progressivism
- Language: Spanish
- Headquarters: Zaragoza, Spain
- Circulation: 15,000
- Website: elperiodicodearagon.com

El Periódico de Aragón is an Aragonese daily newspaper, founded in Zaragoza, on 23 October 1990 by Juancho Dumall. It is published by the Grupo Zeta and whose information focuses primarily on Section Aragon, Opinion and Sports.

== History ==
El Periódico de Aragón was born on 23 October 1990 and soon began to establish itself as the second largest newspaper in the community just behind the Heraldo de Aragón. In 1997 opened a facility in central Newspaper Aragon in Zaragoza Street Hernán Cortés.

The current director of the newspaper is Jaime Armengol, which replaced in 2003 Michelangelo Smooth, director since 1992. This replaced Dumall Juancho (primary responsibility of the newspaper). Progressive trend and completely independent, employs approximately 100 people, of which about 45 are in the newsroom.

El Periódico de Aragón is the head of Grupo Zeta in Aragon, which was a newspaper sports equipment, closed in 2008, other projects, as a leading Internet company called Dicom Media, whose portal is RedAragon and production company, Zeta Audiovisual, whose single biggest customer is the regional television Aragon, Aragon TV.

Reading the newspaper is fun and fast, and often risking their information. It is a pioneer in daily proximity information, neighborhood character, with a section dedicated to the Barrios de Zaragoza. Their most popular columnists include writer John Bolea, songwriter Joaquin Carbonell, and deputy director of the medium, ex-director of the Heraldo de Aragon, Jose Luis Trasobares, whose column "The Independent" trenchantly analyzes the current social and political.

In 2008 the columnist Mariano Gistaín collaborate and work stopped for that day after a successful career in his column "The city of seagulls" regular daily has a circulation of 15,000 copies, but its actual sale, no more than half, 8,000-circulation, according to the magazine "News of Communication" (source OJD) as of 2012. What has come down by 50% in both advertising sales and subscriptions contracted.

== Bibliography ==
- Historia del Periódico de Aragón

== See also ==
- List of newspapers in Spain
