= La Voz de Asturias =

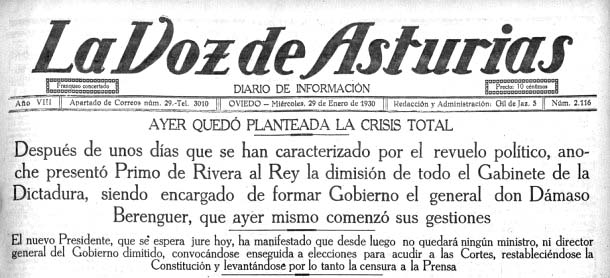
- Type: Digital newspaper
- Format: Digital
- Owner: Santiago Rey Fernández-Latorre
- Founder: José Tartiere Lenegre
- Editor: Ángel Falcón
- Founded: 10 April 1923
- Language: Spanish and Asturian
- Headquarters: Oviedo, Asturias
- Sister newspapers: La Voz de Galicia
- ISSN: 9968-8999
- Website: www.lavozdeasturias.es

La Voz de Asturias is a newspaper in Spain. Published in Oviedo, it serves Asturias. It was founded in 1923 by José Tartiere Lenegre. Until 2012 it was a printed newspaper, after which it ceased publication. Four years later, in 2016, in reemerged as an online newspaper. It has a progressive political stance. Mostly written in Spanish, it also contains a section in Asturian called "Agora" (agora means now in Asturian).

== See also ==
- List of newspapers in Spain
