= Relevo =

Sports-related website

- Website type: Sports journalism
- Available in: Spanish
- Dissolved: May 29, 2025; 15 months ago
- Headquarters: Madrid, Community of Madrid, {{{location_country}}}
- Owner: Grupo Vocento
- Editor: Óscar Campillo
- Website: www.relevo.com
- Commercial: Yes
- Registration: No
- Launched: October 6, 2022; 3 years ago
- Current status: Defunct

Relevo was a sports website written in Spanish and based in Madrid. It covers national and international sports, with a focus on Gen Z and millennial audiences. It is owned by Spanish media group Vocento. It launched on 6 October 2022, after four months of providing editorial coverage on TikTok, Twitch, Instagram, and Twitter.

May 29, 2025, Grupo Vocento discontinued Relevo.

== Content and features ==
Relevo focused on sports-related topics. This differs from the trend of diversifying content observed in mainstream Spanish sports websites, such as Marca and Diario As. Relevo claimed to avoid clickbait techniques to attract users.

Relevo's coverage included a mix of original reporting, videos, and in-depth analysis. Its business model was 'advertising-only'. Vocento stated that it did not expect the project to be EBITDA-positive until 2025.

In the context of sports, the Spanish word "relevo" refers to a member of a team handing off a baton or taking a leg on a relay race competition, such as those typically held in track, cycling, or swimming.

== History ==
Óscar Campillo, former editor of Marca and then PR director at Vocento, started developing the project in December 2021, supported by a small group of former Marca and As journalists. In May 2021, Relevo started a live Twitter thread where a headcount of the team is kept. As of October 2022, this thread featured 73 people.

Relevo started publishing content on TikTok in May 2022. In the following weeks, it launched profiles on Twitter and Instagram, as well as a 3-hour weekday daily live show on Twitch. As of October 2022, Relevo had amassed a combined following of 312,000 user profiles amongst the four platforms.

Relevo's launch on social networks was covered by Spanish media experts as an example of a successful strategy to build a social media following.
