= Antonio Asensio =

Spanish mass media entrepreneur

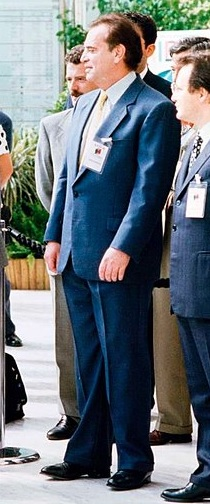
- Asensio in 1996
- Born: Antonio Asensio Pizarro; 11 June 1947; Barcelona, Spain
- Died: 20 April 2001 (aged 53); Barcelona, Spain
- Occupation: Publisher
- Known for: Founder of Grupo Zeta
- Spouse: Chantal Mosbah
- Children: 4

Antonio Asensio Pizarro (11 June 1947 – 20 April 2001) was a Spanish mass media entrepreneur. Having inherited his late father's business at 18, he founded Grupo Zeta in 1976. Starting with the magazine Interviú, which reached circulation of 1 million, his company then moved into newspapers with El Periódico de Catalunya, which became the highest selling in Catalonia. In 1998, he bought 99% of football club RCD Mallorca.

== Early life ==
Asensio was born in Barcelona as the youngest of four children and only son. His father from Zaragoza, also named Antonio, ran a phototypesetting workshop. Asensio graduated in industrial engineering, and was briefly a sports journalist for the Correo Catalan in 1965. When he was 18, his father died and he took over the company.

== Grupo Zeta ==
In March 1976, during the Spanish transition to democracy, Asensio and four friends founded Grupo Zeta with himself as president. The starting capital was 500,000 Spanish pesetas. Their first title was the magazine Interviú, which combined news with semi-naked women. It started in May with a circulation of 100,000, and rose to 1 million in 1978. On 26 October 1978 they launched the daily newspaper El Periódico de Catalunya. The latter became their leading title and Catalonia's highest circulation newspaper, with circulation of 194,000 around the time of his death.

At the time of his death, Asensio's company made 61 billion pesetas (€360 million) per year, with profits of 3 billion (€18 million). Its assets included ten magazines, six newspapers and the Ediciones B publishing house

== RCD Mallorca ==
Asensio also had business interests in football, purchasing 99% of RCD Mallorca in 1998 and becoming club president. Through buying rights to broadcast matches, his group Gestora de Medios Audiovisuales (GMA) also owned 90% of Málaga CF, 63% of Hércules CF, 32% of Sevilla FC and 22% of Sporting de Gijón. On the advice of his lawyers, he sold his shares in these other clubs, due to a law against the same group owning more than 5% of any team. His presidency of Mallorca was the most successful period in the history of the club, which went back into decline when his company ceased being a shareholder; their training complex was named in his honour.

== Personal life ==
Asensio married French-Algerian Chantal Mosbah. They had three daughters (one adopted from China) and a son. The latter, also named Antonio, inherited his business at the age of 19. The eldest daughter Ingrid married the Real Madrid footballer Fernando Sanz, son of club president Lorenzo Sanz.

Asensio died of a brain tumour in Barcelona at the age of 53.
