= Diario del AltoAragón =

- Type: Daily newspaper
- Format: Berliner
- Owner: Publicaciones y Ediciones del Alto Aragón S.A.
- Editor-in-chief: Javier García Antón
- Founded: 25 September 1985
- Political alignment: Centrist
- Language: Spanish
- Headquarters: Huesca, Spain
- Circulation: 6,300 daily
- Website: diariodelaltoaragon.es

Diario del AltoAragón is an Aragonese daily newspaper published in Spain. Most of the information relates to the province, but also offers information on Aragón, Spain, the world and sports.

== History and profile ==
The newspaper was founded by Antonio Angulo Araguás.on 25 September 1985. Its first issue appeared on 28 September of that year as heir of New Spain, newspaper founded in 1936 and auctioned in 1984 to dissolve Chain Social Media State. The paper is headquartered in Huesca.

Since 1989 the paper has been the leading publication in Aragon, which has gradually been expanding its facilities on La Palma street and finally, in 2000, moved its headquarters to Ronda de la Estación from Polígono Industrial Sepes. Its director, from 1 May 1984 until 12 March 2011, was Araguás Antonio Angulo, dean of Spanish directors, who, in that capacity, received an award from the Federation of Journalists in Spain (FAPE) in 2008. Javier García Antón was section chief, chief editor, assistant director, and associate director.

The technology this newspaper uses, as well as its content, have undergone several changes since its inception. It also has an archive of its previous issues dating back to 1875.

== See also ==
- List of newspapers in Spain

== Bibliography ==
- Diario del AltoAragón - Quiénes Somos
