= Correo de Mallorca =

Former newspaper from Palma de Mallorca, Spain

- Type: Daily newspaper
- Founded: 1910
- Ceased publication: 1953
- Language: Spanish
- Headquarters: Palma de Mallorca
- Country: Spain
- ISSN: 1138-1264

Correo de Mallorca was a Spanish-language daily newspaper published in Palma de Mallorca between 1910 and 1953.

== History ==
It was founded in 1910 in Palma de Mallorca, as a Catholic and fundamentalist newspaper. Owned by the Bishopric of Mallorca, throughout its existence Correo de Mallorca had a certain presence on the island. It survived the Civil War, but subsequently entered into a deep economic crisis. As a result of this situation, in 1953 it merged with the newspaper La Almudaina, giving origin to the contemporary Diario de Mallorca.

== Bibliography ==
- Checa Godoy, Antonio (1989). Prensa y partidos políticos durante la II República (in Spanish). Universidad de Salamanca. ISBN 84-7481-521-5.
- Ferrer, Pere (2001). Juan March: los inicios de un imperio financiero, 1900-1924 (in Spanish). Edicions Cort.
- Montero García, Feliciano (2008). La Acción católica en la II República (in Spanish). Universidad de Alcalá.
