= Antonio Franco (journalist) =

Spanish journalist (1947–2021)

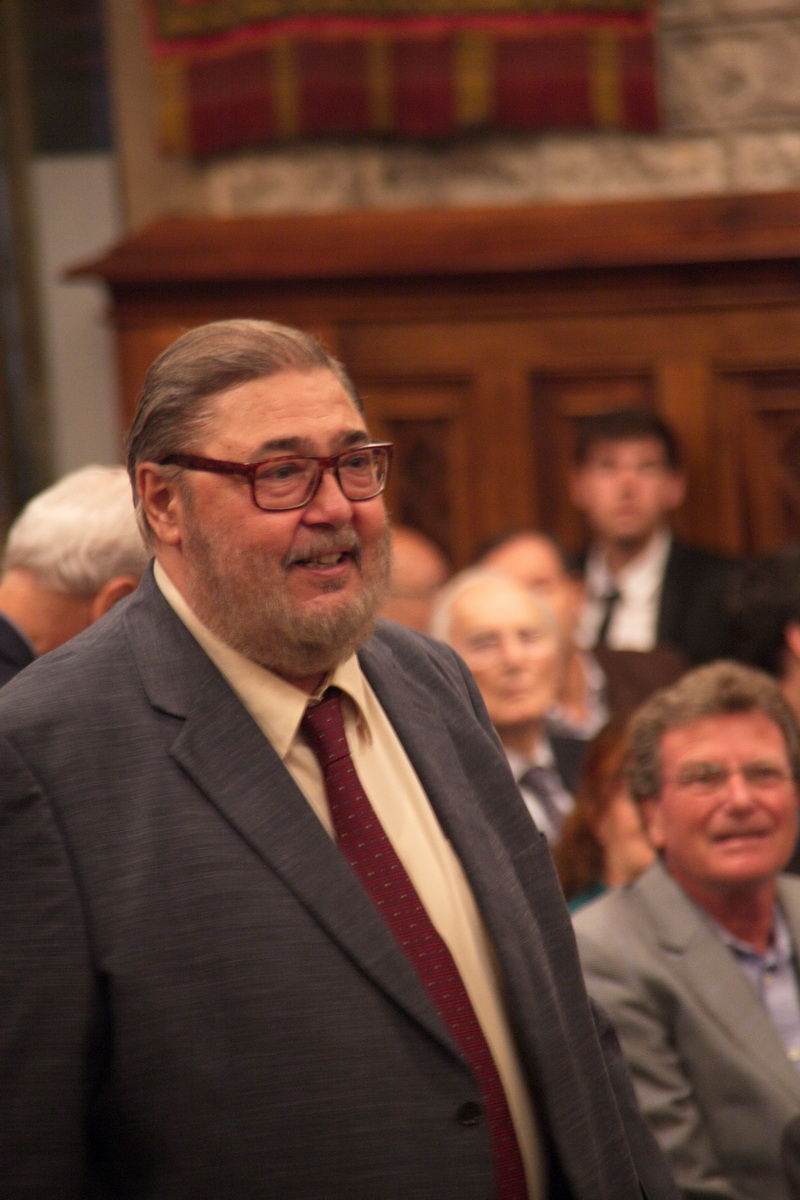
Franco in October 2015

Antonio Franco Estadella (21 January 1947 – 23 September 2021) was a Spanish journalist. He served two times as editor-in-chief of El Periódico de Catalunya. He also worked as deputy editor of El País and as editor of its Catalan-language edition.

== Biography ==
Antonio Franco Estadella was born on 17 January 1947 in Barcelona, in a family with origins from Lleida (his grandfather was Mayor of Lleida and member of Joventut Republicana). After dropping out of a degree in economics, he earned a degree as journalist at the Escuela de Periodismo de la Iglesia in 1968. He was a member of the Anti-Francoist Grup Democràtic de Periodistes. First editor of El Periódico de Catalunya, founded in 1978, he served in that post until 1982. He was hired by El País in 1982, helping to launch the Catalan-language edition. He returned to the helm of El Periódico in 1988, retiring in 2006.

Franco used to define himself as a left-wing person, and, in 2014, he embraced Guanyem Barcelona, which he described as "that necessary political and social force capable of transforming reality, from the left".

He died from cancer on 25 September 2021, in Barcelona.

== Awards ==
- Premio Godó de Periodismo (1995)
- Premio Ortega y Gasset (1996)
- Premio Luca de Tena (2000)
- Creu de Sant Jordi (2006)
- Premio Antonio Asensio (2007)
