= La Nuestra Tierra =

- Publisher: Instituto de Estudios Leoneses
- Founded: 2000
- Language: Spanish and Leonese
- Ceased publication: 2004
- Country: Spain

La Nuestra Tierra (Our land) was a weekly newspaper edited by the IDEL (Leonese Studies Institute) between 2000 and 2004. Its content was mainly about the Leonese territory and 30% of it was written in the Leonese language, from opinion articles to information on Leonese. A total of 162 issues was published. The journal was supported by the European Union and the Leonese public administrations.
