= Diario de Mallorca =

Spanish daily newspaper

- Type: Daily newspaper
- Owner: Prensa Ibérica
- Founded: 1953; 73 years ago
- Language: Spanish
- Headquarters: Palma de Mallorca, Spain
- Circulation: 5,800 (2024)
- ISSN: 1131-9518
- OCLC number: 1322192844
- Website: diariodemallorca.es

The Diario de Mallorca (Spanish pronunciation: [diˈaɾjo de maˈʝoɾka]) is a Spanish daily newspaper based in Palma de Mallorca.

== History ==
The Diario de Mallorca was founded in 1953 from a merger between the Correo de Mallorca and La Almudaina. In November 1991, Prensa Ibérica acquired a majority stake in the newspaper. According to the Oficina de Justificación de la Difusión, the newspaper had a print circulation of 23,218 from July 2007 to June 2008.

In 2005, journalists Matías Vallés, Felipe Armendáriz, and Marisa Goñi reported on the Central Intelligence Agency's use of Son Sant Joan Airport as a base in its "extraordinary rendition" program. For their reporting, the journalists won the Ortega y Gasset Award for print journalism.

== Notable personnel ==
- Antonio Alemany Dezcallar
- Felipe Armendáriz
- Pedro Pablo Alonso
- Maria Ferrer
- Juan Antonio Fuster
- Marisa Goñi
- José E. Iglesias
- Josep Melià i Pericàs
- Xim Rada
- Antoni Sabater
- Matías Vallés
