= El Correo =

Daily newspaper in Bilbao and the Basque Country of northern Spain

- Type: Daily newspaper
- Format: Tabloid
- Owner: Grupo Vocento
- Publisher: Bilbao Editorial
- Editor: José Miguel Santamaría Alday
- Founded: 1 May 1910; 116 years ago (as El Pueblo Vasco)
- Political alignment: Spanish unionism Liberal conservatism
- Language: Spanish
- Headquarters: Calle Pintor Losada 7, Bilbao, Spain
- Website: elcorreo.com

El Correo (Spanish pronunciation: [el koˈreo]; lit. 'The Courier') is a daily newspaper in Bilbao and the Basque Country of northern Spain. It is among best-selling general interest newspapers in Spain.

== History and profile ==
The brothers Ybarra y de la Revilla – Fernando, Gabriel and Emilio – founded El Pueblo Vasco ("The Basque People") on 1 May 1910, with Juan de la Cruz as founding editor. The paper supported Vizcaya's young Conservative Party and its editorial line was clerical, Alfonsist monarchist, free press and Basque regional autonomist. The paper's chief competitor in Bilbao was La Gaceta del Norte.

Due to these conservative stances, El Pueblo Vasco was shut down by the Spanish Republic government on 17 July 1936, just before the Spanish Civil War. It was almost a year later, on 6 July 1937, when the paper published again, after the fall of Bilbao; it was joined on newsstands by El Correo Español, the official newspaper of the Falange Española Tradicionalista y de las JONS, the Spanish fascist party, using the seized presses of the Basque nationalist daily Euzkadi.

By order of caudillo Francisco Franco's government on 13 April 1938, the two papers combined as El Correo Español-El Pueblo Vasco, owned by El Pueblo Vasco S.A. but controlled by the Falange. During the first 15 years of Francoist Spain, El Correo acquired its competitors El Noticiero Bilbaíno (1939) and El Diario Vasco (1945). Upon this last purchase, the company's name was changed to Bilbao Editorial S.A.

The year 1965 saw El Correo move to its current offices in Calle Pintor Losada, convert to tabloid format and increase the number of pages. In 1976, El Correo for the first time surpassed La Gaceta del Norte in sales, becoming the best-selling newspaper in northern Spain.

Also around this time, publisher Javier de Ybarra y Bergé was kidnapped and murdered by rogue elements of the Basque separatist organization ETA. Vatican had a share in El Correo until 1989.

El Correo was the promoter of La Vuelta, the yearly bicycle race around Spain, between 1955 and 1978. However, due to ETA organising attacks on the race from the late 1960s, and increasing disorder around the race in the late 1970s during the Spanish transition to democracy, the Royal Spanish Cycling Federation banned the race from passing through the Basque Country, resulting in El Correo's announcement in January 1979 that it would no longer organise the race. It was subsequently promoted by the sports event company Unipublic and did not return to the Basque Country until 2011.

== Expansion ==
The 1980s brought geographic expansion, as El Correo began to publish editions outside the Bilbao metro area and so it purchased El Diario Montañés, a newspaper in Santander. The paper now publishes nine local editions: five within the province of Vizcaya, which includes Bilbao, and one each serving the provinces of Álava, Guipúzcoa (sharing territory with El Diario Vasco), Burgos (in the city of Miranda de Ebro) and La Rioja. In April 2014, El Correo began to be published and distributed in the United Arab Emirates.

El Correo, El Diario Vasco and El Diario Montañés are now owned by Grupo Vocento, a nationwide communications company that also owns ABC in Madrid and Las Provincias. The editor-in-chief of El Correo is Juan Carlos Martínez Gauna and its publisher is Bilbao Editorial.

The paper is published in tabloid format. The daily comic strip Don Celes (by Luis del Olmo, originally published in La Gaceta del Norte) is now a symbol of the newspaper.

In 2012 El Correo was named as the Newspaper of the Year in the category of regional newspapers by the European Newspapers Congress.

== Circulation ==
The circulation of El Correo was 134,000 copies in 1993. It rose to 138,000 copies in 1994.

Its circulation was 130,042 copies in 2002. It fell to 128,000 copies in 2003. The paper had a circulation of 112,588 copies in 2006. The 2008 circulation of the paper was 118,107 copies.

== Notable journalists ==
- Sara Estévez
