= Super Deporte =

Online Spanish sports newspaper

- Type: Sport daily
- Founded: 2003
- Language: Spanish
- Headquarters: Valencia
- Website: superdeporte.es

Superdeporte, also known as Super Deporte, is a daily online Spanish sports newspaper published in Valencia.

== Background ==
Superdeporte is an internet based daily sports newspaper from Valencia. They cover many sports with a particular interest in the two large football teams from the region, Valencia and Levante, along with motorsports, poker and sports run through local polideportivos. Their offices were located at Avda de Aragon 2, Valencia.

== History ==
Superdeporte was founded in 2003, one of two Spanish newspapers to be founded that year along with the Granada based La Opinión de Granada. Founded in the 2000s, they joined the marker at the time the online Seville based sport daily, Estadio Deportivo. The two publications were both in competition with the big four sport dailies: Marca, AS, Mundo Deportivo and Sport. While Spain underwent an economic crisis and newspaper circulation overall went into decline, Superdeporte, Estadio Deportivo, Marca, AS, Mundo Deportivo and Sport all saw readership growth. Their director in 2003 was Vincente Bau Miquel. He continued to hold this role in 2005. By 2008, they had established themselves as one of the most read online newspapers in Valencia.
