= Faro de Vigo =

Spanish newspaper

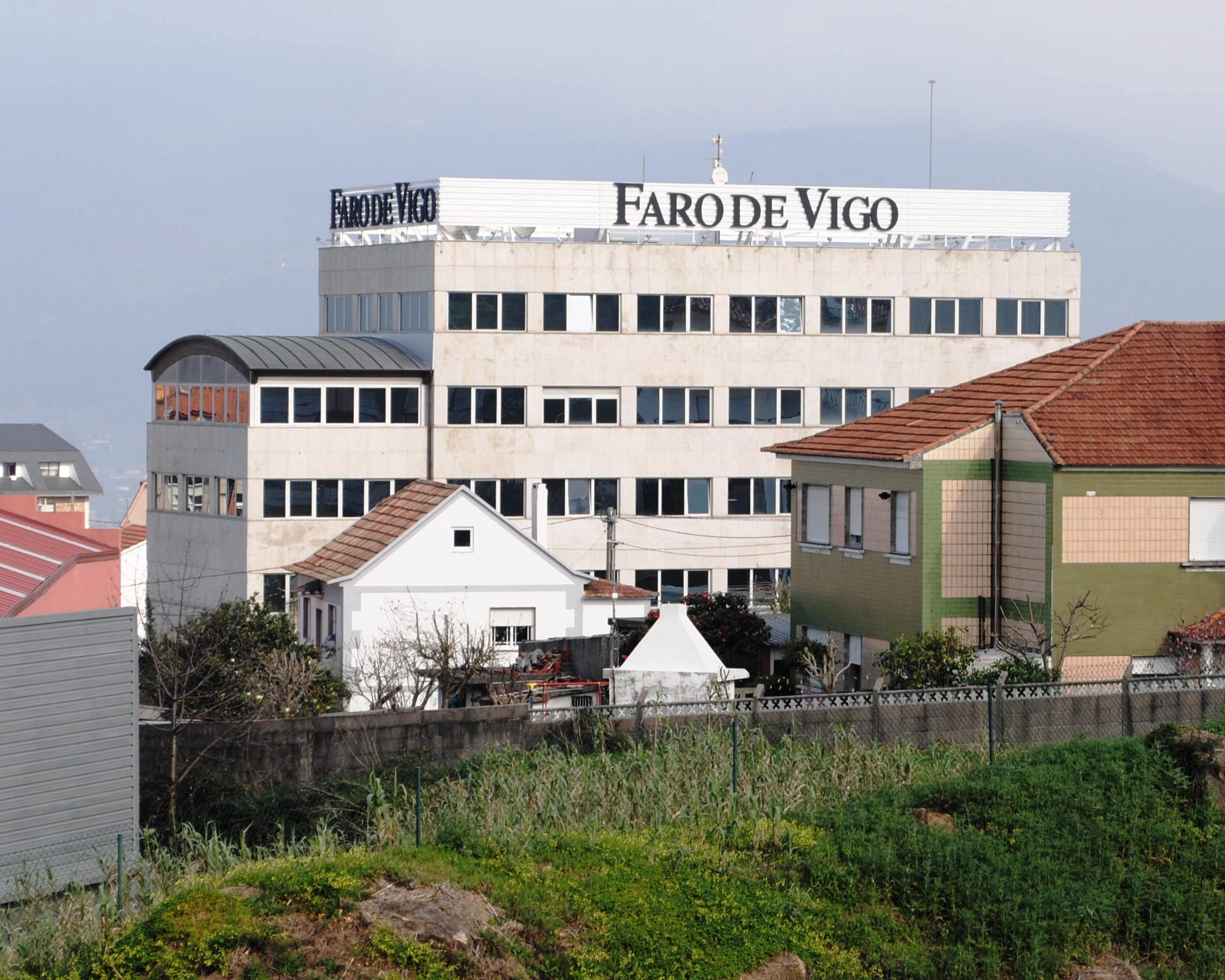
- Type: Daily newspaper
- Format: Compact
- Owner: Editorial Prensa Ibérica
- Publisher: Faro de Vigo S.A.U.
- Editor: Juan Carlos Da Silva
- Founded: 3 November 1853
- Political alignment: Regionalism, Centrism
- Language: Spanish, Galician
- Headquarters: Redondela, Spain
- Circulation: 17,000 (2024)
- ISSN: 1131-8163
- Website: farodevigo.es

Faro de Vigo is a daily newspaper from the town of Vigo, in Galicia, Spain. It is the oldest Spanish newspaper in circulation. The word "faro" means lighthouse.

== History and profile ==
Faro de Vigo was published for the first time on November 3, 1853 on a small printing house by its founder, Angel de Lema y Marina, at the rúa Olivo in Vigo, "with the idea of defending the general interests of Galicia and, especially, of his hometown". It was initially published twice a week, becoming three times a week from 1 June 1875 and daily from 7 July 1879. Its headquarters are located in Chapela, Redondela, Galicia, Spain.

Since 1986 it has belonged to Prensa Ibérica, a communication group that consists of 14 journalistic mastheads. The publisher of the paper is Faro de Vigo S.A.

In 2002, its average daily circulation reached 42,245 copies, certified by the Office of Circulation Certification (OJD). The numbers, as released by the General Study of Media (EGM, first wave 2020), which gave it 194,000 readers a day, put it among the 15 most important Spanish newspapers, and the leader in Southern Galicia.

The staff consists of around 150 workers. The paper prints six daily editions; the one with most diffusion covers Vigo. The others cover Pontevedra, Arousa, Ourense, Morrazo and Deza-Tabeirós-Montes.

The digital edition was introduced in January 1999. In 2020 it was ranked 25th among the most read websites in Spain.

== Notable contributors ==
- Xosé Luís Méndez Ferrín
- Álvaro Cunqueiro
- María Oruña
