= Estadio Deportivo =

Spanish sports newspaper

- Type: Digital sports newspaper
- Format: Website
- Owner: Unidad Editorial
- Founded: 1995; 31 years ago
- Language: Spanish
- Headquarters: Seville, Andalusia
- Country: Spain
- Website: estadiodeportivo.com

Estadio Deportivo (Spanish pronunciation: [esˈtaðjo ðepoɾˈtiβo]; lit. 'Sports Stadium') is a Spanish-language sports daily newspaper published in Seville, Spain. The paper has been in circulation since 1995. While it was previously distributed as a supplement to the daily newspaper, El Mundo during its print era, it now operates independently as a digital-native outlet. The newspaper provides continuous, real-time coverage of national and international sports news, with a particular focus on the Spanish major football clubs.

== History ==
Estadio Deportivo was established as a weekly newspaper in 1995. On 28 August 1996, it began to be published daily. The paper is based in Seville. The former owners of the paper were Recoletos (85%) and Grupo Prensa Ibérica (15%). In 2007, it became part of Unidad Editorial. On 11 January 2010, Estadio Deportivo was sold to El Mundo. In 2021, the newspaper was acquired by Alpred, marking its transition into a fully digital-native sports media outlet with continuous online updates.
