= Sara Estévez =

Sara Estévez Urquijo (born 1925) is a Spanish former football radio personality and journalist. She previously used the pseudonym "Marathon".
