= Tenerife Weekly =

Online English language newspaper in Spain

Tenerife Weekly is an online English language newspaper in the Canary Islands that is published to help and support English language speakers interested in Tenerife.

The Tenerife news site focuses on local news in Tenerife, but also includes news from other islands in the archipelago and national news from Spain.

Tenerife Weekly is exclusively an English language news publication focused on the island of Tenerife in the Canary Islands, Spain. It offers local news, cultural features, business updates and event coverage aimed at English speaking residents, tourists and expatriates.

== History and profile ==
Tenerife Weekly aggregates content from regional outlets and does not produce original reporting. It was resurrected in July 2020 as an online only publication by Pedro Sarkis to support English language visitors and residents across the island.

== Coverage and audience ==
The publication covers a wide range of topics: local politics, social issues, environment, tourism, business and culture. For example, recent articles include “Tenerife Environment Mobility: TF-5 Nears the Country’s Busiest Traffic Route” and “Video: Tuk Tuks Begin Operation in Santa Cruz, Police Halt Due to Lack of Licence”. When the volcano on La Palma erupted, Tenerife Weekly was a useful source for NASA. Stories and reports have been used by the likes of Business Insider, Spanish Entrepreneur, and AOL.

Its target audience consists of English speakers living in or visiting Tenerife who want timely local news and context.

== Language and format ==
The site is published in English and only online.
