= Interviú =

Spanish review magazine (1976–2018)

- Categories: News magazine
- Frequency: Weekly
- Publisher: Grupo Zeta
- Total circulation (2011): 54,046
- Founder: Antonio Asensio Pizarro
- Founded: 1976
- First issue: 22 May 1976
- Final issue: 8 January 2018
- Country: Spain
- Based in: Madrid
- Language: Spanish
- Website: Official website

Interviú (a Spanish Anglicism for "interview") was a Spanish language weekly news magazine published in Madrid, Spain. It was in circulation between 1976 and 2018.

== History and profile ==
Interviú was established in 1976 in Barcelona by a group led by Antonio Asensio Pizarro and Josep Llario. It was first published on 22 May 1976. The publisher of the magazine was Grupo Zeta which was also founded by Asensio Pizarro in 1976. The magazine was published weekly on Mondays, and its headquarters was in Madrid.

The magazine was famous for publishing semi-nude and nude photographs of the rich and famous, sometimes using paparazzi photoshoots or posed pictorials. In this last case the subjects were normally women, typically Spanish actresses and singers. It also published interviews with politicians and articles on political and economic scandals and it featured opinion pieces by famous writers. Another notable inclusion was news photographs that were considered too violent or gory for use by the daily press.

Its last issue was on 8 January 2018. Grupo Zeta explained this was due to financial reasons and changes in the way the public consumes news.

== Circulation ==
The circulation of Interviú was about 1 million copies both in 1977 and in 1978. It rose to three million copies in 1979. The magazine had a circulation of 122,644 copies in 2003.

Its circulation was 94,461 copies in 2008 and 62,614 copies in 2009. The circulation of the weekly was 54,046 copies in 2011.

== See also ==
- List of magazines in Spain
