= El Comercio (Spain) =

Spanish newspaper

- Type: Daily newspaper
- Format: Tabloid
- Owner: Grupo Vocento
- Editor: Marcelino Gutiérrez
- Founded: 2 September 1878; 147 years ago
- Language: Spanish
- Headquarters: Gijón, Asturias
- Circulation: 11,000 (2024)
- Website: elcomercio.es

El Comercio is a daily newspaper in Spain. Published in Gijón, it is the second-largest newspaper by circulation in Asturias, with a daily circulation of 24,000.

== History and profile ==
El Comercio was first published on 2 September 1878. Since 1995 the paper has been part of Grupo Vocento. In 1996, it acquired La Voz de Avilés, and it continues that name for its Avilés edition.

In 1995, El Comercio became the first newspaper in Spain to be available on the Internet.

In 2006 El Comercio had a circulation of 27,843 copies.

In December 2018, it was the first media outlet to sign the Social Pact against Violence against Women in Asturias.

== See also ==
- List of newspapers in Spain
