= Grupo Vocento =

Spanish communications company

Vocento, S.A.
- Company type: Sociedad Anónima
- Traded as: BMAD: PVA
- ISIN: ES0114820113
- Industry: Mass media
- Predecessor: Grupo Correo; Prensa Española
- Founded: 2001; 25 years ago
- Headquarters: Madrid, Spain
- Area served: Nationwide
- Products: ABC, El Correo, Relevo
- Website: www.vocento.com

Vocento, S.A., also known as Grupo Vocento, is a Spanish mass media group. Its flagship daily newspaper is the conservative and monarchist ABC, also publishing El Correo. Vocento was created in 2001 upon the merger of Grupo Correo with Prensa Española, the publisher of ABC. The group is also a player in the regional press sector, mainly owing to former properties of Correo (El Diario Montañés, La Verdad, Hoy, Ideal, Sur, La Rioja, El Norte de Castilla, El Comercio). Through Net TV, the group also owns a digital terrestrial television license in Spain, which is leased to Paramount Network and Disney Channel.

== History ==
It has its origins in 1910 with the launch of El Pueblo Vasco, a newspaper founded by the Ybarra family, which merged with El Correo Español, another newspaper, in 1938. In the 1940s they obtained shares in the newspaper El Noticiero Bilbaíno and in 1948 they began its development with the acquisition of most of El Diario Vasco. The expansion outside the Basque Country (Spain) started in 1984 with the acquisition of shares in El Diario Montañés (a newspaper published in the nearby province of Santander).

In the 1980s, the holding company Corporación de Medios de Comunicación Social (Comecosa) was created, which acquired eight regional leading newspapers (Las Provincias, La Rioja, El Norte de Castilla, etc). In 1988, the newspapers La Verdad (Murcia), Hoy (Badajoz) and Ideal (Granada) were acquired. In 1990, the Diario Sur de Málaga was also incorporated.

== Profile ==
The Group was established in 2001 as a result of the merger of Grupo Correo and Prensa Española. The company has its headquarters in Madrid. It is the national leader in the publication of general supplements (XLSemanal, MHMujer, El Semanal TV) and specialist magazines (Mi Cartera de Inversión, Motor 16 and corporate magazines). It also has held assets in the entertainment sector, in both radio (Punto Radio) and television (Telecinco (13%), Net TV, Fly Music), and in audiovisual production and distribution (Hospital Central, El Comisario and Pasapalabra, among others), as well as the Internet, with more than 19 million unique visitors. In addition, the company has a news agency, Colpisa.

Vocento operates multiple media properties, including several newspapers over a century old. The company has been listed on the Madrid Stock Exchange since 8 November 2006.

Vocento and ABC opened a new headquarters in Josefa Valcárcel in July 2020.

== Holdings ==
=== Newspapers ===
In 2006 the share of the group in the Spanish press market was 25,7%.

- ABC
- El Correo
- El Diario Vasco
- El Diario Montañés
- La Verdad
- Ideal
- Hoy
- Sur
- La Rioja
- El Norte de Castilla
- El Comercio
- La Voz de Cádiz
- Las Provincias

=== Magazines ===
- Mujer Hoy
