= Diario de Almería =

Spanish newspaper

- Type: Diary newspaper
- Editor: Grupo Joly
- Founded: 1 November 2007; 17 years ago
- Language: Spanish
- Sister newspapers: La Voz de Almería; Ideal
- Website: http://www.diariodealmeria.es

El Diario de Almería, founded as Almería Actualidad and sometimes called El Almería, is a Spanish newspaper edited in Almería. It was previously a free newspaper published between 2003 and 2009.

== History ==
It was launched on 1 November 2007 by Grupo Joly. According to Oficina de Justificación de la Difusión (OJD), in 2010 Diario de Almería had a spreading of 3.072 copies, while his web page had an average of 7.5297 visits.

== Bibliography ==
- Reig García, Ramón (2011). La comunicación en Andalucía: Historia, estructura y nuevas tecnologías. Sevilla: Centro de Estudios Andaluces. ISBN 978-84-939078-0-8.
