= Grupo Joly =

Spanish publishing company

Grupo Joly is a Spanish publishing company which started operating in 1867 in Andalusia, southern Spain, publishing Diario de Cádiz. Grupo Joly sold 100,000 copies a day in 2002 and reached 400,000 readers daily.

== Publications ==
Grupo Joly's publications include eight Spanish dailies:

- Diario de Cádiz
- Diario de Jerez
- Europa Sur
- Diario de Sevilla
- El Dia de Córdoba
- Huelva Información
- Granada Hoy
- Málaga Hoy

== Management ==
- Rosario Joly Palomino
- José Joly Palomino
- Rosa Joly Palomino

== Editors ==
- Manuel Clavero Arévalo
- José Luis Ballester
- Carlos Colón Perales
- Manuel Concha Ruiz
- Francisco Ferraro
- Rafael Padilla

== Directives ==
- José Joly Martínez Salazar
- Tomás Valiente
- Javier Moyano
- Juan Carlos Fernandez
- Javier Ysasi
- Javier Tovar
- José Juaquín León
- José Antonio Carrizosa
- Manuel Jesús Florencio
- Angel Navarro
- Pablo Joly
- Javier Prieto
- Ignacio G. Cosgaya
- Fernando de Parias
- Tomás Díaz
