= La Nueva España =

Spanish newspaper

- Type: Daily newspaper
- Format: Tabloid
- Publisher: Editorial Prensa Asturiana
- Founded: 19 December 1936
- Political alignment: Liberal conservatism
- Language: Spanish, Asturian
- Headquarters: Oviedo, Asturias
- Circulation: 33,000 (2024)
- Website: lne.es

La Nueva España is a daily newspaper in Spain. Published in Oviedo, it serves Asturias. The publisher of the paper is Editorial Prensa Asturiana. It is published in tabloid format. The paper has an independent political stance.

Letizia Ortiz Rocasolano, Queen of Spain, worked for La Nueva España when she was a university student.

La Nueva España publishes a list of the Asturian of the Month. The paper had nearly a circulation of 100,000 copies on weekends in 1998.

== See also ==
- List of newspapers in Spain
