= El Periódico Extremadura =

Spanish daily newspaper

- Publisher: Prensa Ibérica
- Founded: 1 April 1923
- Headquarters: Cáceres, Extremadura, Spain

El Periódico Extremadura (originally Extremadura) is a Spanish-language daily newspaper. Founded in 1923, it is published in Cáceres, Spain. It is part of the Prensa Ibérica. It is along Hoy one of the two major newspapers in the autonomous community of Extremadura.

== History ==
It was founded on 1 April 1923 under the auspice of Pedro Segura, bishop of Coria. During the Second Republic, the editorial policy oscillated between the Catholic integrism and the extreme right, although it occasionally endorsed the right-wing CEDA as the "lesser evil". Initially published as evening newspaper, it had a modest circulation.

One of its writers (Juan Milán Cebrián) broke the news about the proclamation of Francisco Franco as "Caudillo" in 1936, following the seizure of Cáceres by the rebel faction in the midst of the Spanish Civil War.

The newspaper was edited by Tomás Murillo Iglesias (1923–1927), Antonio Reyes Huertas (1927–1937) and Rafael Bittini y López de Guijarro (1937–1939). During most of the Francoist dictatorship it was edited by Dionisio Acedo (1939–1972).

It was purchased by the Grupo Zeta in 1988, and it was renamed as El Periódico Extremadura. Since 2019 it belongs to the Prensa Ibérica publishing group.
