= Las Provincias =

Daily newspaper in Spain

- Type: Regional daily newspaper
- Owner: Grupo Vocento
- Publisher: Federico Domenech SA
- Founded: 30 January 1866; 160 years ago
- Political alignment: Conservatism; Blaverism
- Language: Spanish
- Headquarters: Valencia
- Country: Spain
- Circulation: 10,500 (as of 2023)
- Sister newspapers: ABC; El Correo Español; El Diario Vasco; La Verdad
- ISSN: 1578-7923
- OCLC number: 918393908
- Website: lasprovincias.es

Las Provincias is a regional newspaper published in Valencia, Spain. Founded in 1866, it is one of the oldest publications in the country.

== History and profile ==
Las Provincias was first published in Valencia in January 1866. The paper is part of the Vocento Group and is published by Federico Domenech SA. The daily has six local editions published in La Ribera, Camp de Morvedre, La Costera, La Safor, La Marina and Castellon. Its sister newspapers include ABC, El Correo Español, El Diario Vasco and La Verdad, all of which are part of the Vocento Group.

Since its foundation in 1866 Las Provincias has been always defending the rights of Valencia City following the ideas of the founder the poet Teodoro Llorente Olivares. In 1957 after the 1957 Valencia flood the director of the paper was forced to resign by the governor of Francisco Franco

Las Provincias has a right-wing political stance.

The paper has a supplement, namely XL Semanal.

== Circulation ==
Las Provincias sold 58,354 copies in 1993. Its circulation was 42,905 copies in 2002. It was 28,000 copies in 2011. The paper had a circulation of 20,771 copies in 2014.
