= Diario de Cádiz =

Spanish-language newspaper published in Cádiz, Spain

- Type: Daily newspaper
- Owner: Grupo Joly
- Founder: Federico Joly Velasco
- Founded: 16 June 1867
- Language: Spanish
- Circulation: 7,900 (2024)
- Website: diariodecadiz.com

Diario de Cádiz is a Spanish-language newspaper published in Cádiz, Spain. The paper serves the province of Cádiz.

== History and profile ==
Diario de Cádiz was first published on 16 June 1867 by Federico Joly Velasco. The paper had its headquarters in Cádiz.

In 2006 Diario de Cádiz sold 29,004 copies.

== See also ==
- List of newspapers in Spain
