= Euzkadi (newspaper) =

Basque daily news paper

Euzkadi was a daily newspaper published in Bilbao, Basque Country. Its first edition was on 1 February 1913.

Euzkadi published texts both in Basque and Spanish, and it employed one editor-in-chief for each language. The first editor-in-chief for Basque was writer Evaristo Kirikiño Bustintza.

One of the Basque nationalist journalists who wrote for the paper was Manuel Aznar Zubigaray, who later would become a falangist. He was the grandfather of eventual Spanish prime minister José María Aznar.

Euzkadi supported the branch of Basque Nationalist Party that was called Comunión Nacionalista Vasca ("Basque Nationalist Communion") after the party had split in 1921.

In June 1937, after the "national" forces had occupied Bilbao during the Spanish Civil War, Euzkadi's publication there was cancelled. Its premises were offered to El Correo Español which then was the newspaper of Spanish Falange.

Basque nationalist refugees continued the publication of Euzkadi in Barcelona in 1938–1939.
