= Levante-EMV =

Newspaper from Valencia, Spain

Levante-El Mercantil Valenciano
- Type: Newspaper
- Owner: Prensa Ibérica
- Political alignment: Center-left
- Language: Spanish; Catalan
- Website: levante-emv.com

Levante-El Mercantil Valenciano is a Spanish regional newspaper from the Valencian Community that belongs to the Prensa Ibérica media holding. It had a brief precedent in Avance (30 March – 15 April 1939) and it was the bulletin of the Valencian section of the FET y de las JONS. The newspaper later belonged to the Movimiento (official Francoist political movement) press. From 1977 it belonged to the Medios de Comunicación Social del Estado (Social Communication Media of the State) and in 1984 it was purchased by the private enterprise Prensa Valenciana.

Its ideology could be placed in the center-left even though it holds its independence. In Castelló it is published as Levante de Castelló. It has different editions that correspond to different areas of the Valencian region (Valencia, L'Horta, Safor and so on). It is nowadays the most read newspaper in the Valencian region.

The printed edition is mostly in Spanish, even though two pages about cultural and social events in Catalan is published daily (Panorama) and weekly there is also a literary supplement (Post Data) in that language, together with some collaborations and articles. The digital edition has a version in Spanish and since 1 May 2016 also in Catalan.

== Important journalists and collaborators ==
- Joan Fuster, historian, writer and essayist.
- Francesc de Paula Burguera, writer and journalist. He took an active role in the Valencian politics during the Spanish transition.
- Antonio Ortiz Fuster, a.k.a. Ortifus, Valencian cartoonist. He publishes a dayly cartoon on the second page of the newspaper.
