= Hoy (Extremadura) =

Spanish-language daily newspaper

- Type: Daily newspaper
- Publisher: Grupo Vocento
- Founded: 1933
- Political alignment: Right-of-centre
- Language: Spanish
- Headquarters: Badajoz, Extremadura, Spain
- Circulation: 6,500 (2024)
- Website: hoy.es

Hoy is a Spanish-language daily newspaper published in Badajoz, Spain. It is along El Periódico Extremadura one of the two major newspapers in the autonomous community of Extremadura. Originally a venture of Editorial Católica, it is currently part of the Vocento Group.

== History ==
It was founded in 1933 by Editorial Católica (EDICA), and it came to replace the Correo Extremeño. According to a review published in the same newspaper it was "created to fight against Socialism". Its first editor was Santiago Lozano, coming from the School of Journalism of El Debate. For the rest of the Second Republic the newspaper stuck to editorial policy close to the CEDA. During the Francoist dictatorship the newspaper remained under the control of EDICA.

Hoy was purchased in 1988 by the Correo Group, merged in 2001 with Prensa Española to form Vocento.
