= Diari de Girona =

Catalan daily newspaper

- Type: Daily newspaper
- Owner: Prensa Ibérica
- Editor: Jordi Xargayó
- Founded: 1943
- Language: Catalan
- Headquarters: Girona
- Circulation: 2,800 (2024)
- Price: €1.10 (Monday-Saturday) €2.20 (Sunday)
- Website: diaridegirona.cat

Diari de Girona (Catalan pronunciation: [diˈaɾi ðə ʒiˈɾonə]) is a Catalan daily newspaper, based in Girona, Catalonia.

== History and profile ==
The newspaper was founded in 1943 with the name of Los Sitios, using the equipment confiscated from the newspaper L'Autonomista, owned by the Rahola family. At that time, it was the only daily publication of the province of Girona, and the press of the Spanish state in Girona. During the transition to democracy it kept its name until the end of the 1970s, when it changed to Los Sitios-Diari de Girona, and gradually introduced the Catalan language. Finally, at the beginning of the 1980s it adopted the current name and a democratic and independent publisher, and started fully running in the Catalan language.
