= El Diario Vasco =

Daily newspaper in San Sebastian, Spain

- Type: Daily newspaper
- Format: Tabloid
- Owner: Vocento
- Founded: 27 November 1934; 91 years ago
- Political alignment: Conservative liberalism; Spanish nationalism
- Language: Spanish
- Headquarters: San Sebastián, Spain
- Circulation: 38,000 (2024)
- Website: diariovasco.com

El Diario Vasco (The Basque daily) is a Spanish morning daily newspaper based in San Sebastián, Basque Country.

== History and profile ==
El Diario Vasco was founded in 1934 by the Sociedad Vascongada de Publicaciones, led by conservative writers such as Juan Ignacio Luca de Tena or Ramiro de Maeztu. The paper has its headquarters in San Sebastián.

Following the outbreak of the Spanish Civil War in 1936, El Diario Vasco supported the Nationalist faction and was closed by the Republican government for two months until San Sebastián was conquered by the Nationalists. In 1945 the paper was bought by the Falange-controlled holders of El Correo Español, which then changed its name from El Pueblo Vasco SA to Bilbao Editorial SA.

El Diario Vasco is currently owned by Grupo Vocento which also owns ABC, El Correo and Las Provincias, among the others. El Diario Vasco has a neutral political stance.

The paper publishes ten editions through Guipúzcoa and one for the rest of Spain. In May 2001 its chief financial officer Santiago Oleaga was killed by two ETA militants.

== Circulation ==
The circulation of El Diario Vasco was 93,578 copies in 1993. Its circulation was 91,391 copies in 2002 and 85,514 copies in 2006. The paper had a circulation of 68,000 copies in 2011.
