= El Periódico (Barcelona) =

Spanish newspaper

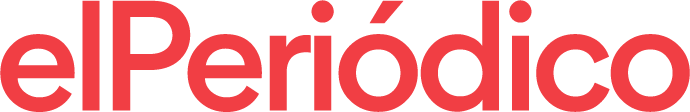
- Type: Daily newspaper
- Format: Berliner
- Owner: Prensa Ibérica
- Founder: Antonio Asensio Pizarro
- Editor: Albert Sáez
- Founded: 26 October 1978; 48 years ago
- Political alignment: Social liberalism Progressivism; Catalanism
- Language: Spanish and Catalan
- Headquarters: L'Hospitalet de Llobregat, Catalonia, Spain
- Circulation: 60,000 (2024)
- Sister newspapers: Sport
- Website: Spanish elperiodico.com/es/ Catalan, elperiodico.cat

El Periódico, formerly known as El Periódico de Catalunya, is a morning daily newspaper based in Barcelona, Catalonia, Spain. The paper publishes separate daily editions in Spanish and in Catalan. El Periódico is the second highest-circulated newspaper in Catalonia, behind La Vanguardia which also publishes in both languages.

== History and profile ==
El Periódico was first published on 26 October 1978 by Antonio Asensio Pizarro to offer a progressive Catalan paper connected to Catalan socialism.

The first editor was Antonio Franco. The paper has also center-left stance. The paper was owned by Grupo Zeta, which was purchased by Prensa Ibérica in May 2019.

One of the most recent directors, Rafael Nadal, is the brother of the Catalan socialist leader Joaquim Nadal. Originally, El Periódico printed only in Spanish, but began a Catalan-language edition on 27 October 1997. Today, the separate editions are distinguished by the red front-page nameplate on the Spanish version of El Periódico and the blue nameplate on the Catalan edition.

== Circulation ==
The circulation of El Periódico de Catalunya was 185,517 copies in 1993 and 193,576 copies in 1994. Its circulation was 218,000 copies in 2000. The paper had a circulation of 167,000 copies in 2003. The 2008 circulation of the paper was 152,025 copies. The paper had a circulation of 133,265 copies in 2009 and 133,035 copies in 2010. It was 119,374 copies in 2011.
