= Sport (Spanish newspaper) =

Spanish daily sports newspaper

- Type: Daily newspaper
- Format: Tabloid
- Owner: Grupo Zeta
- Founder: Josep María Casanovas
- Publisher: Ediciones Deportivas Catalanas, S.A.
- Editor-in-chief: Ernest Folch
- Founded: 1979; 47 years ago
- Language: Spanish
- Headquarters: Barcelona, Catalonia, Spain
- Sister newspapers: El Periódico de Catalunya
- Website: www.sport.es/en/

Sport is a Spanish daily sports newspaper based in Barcelona, Catalonia.

== History and profile ==
Founded in 1979, Sport is owned by Grupo Zeta, which also publishes El Periódico de Catalunya.

Ideologically, Sport defines itself as the newspaper of the supporters of FC Barcelona, with its slogan being "Sempre amb el Barça" (lit. 'Always with Barça') in Catalan). It caters primarily to a Catalonia-based readership despite being written in Spanish. Sport also covers RCD Espanyol and Catalan and Spanish football in general other sports, especially basketball, motor sports, cycling, handball, and tennis.
