= ABC (newspaper) =

Spanish newspaper established in 1903

- Front page, 2 June 2009
- Type: Daily newspaper
- Format: Compact
- Owner: Grupo Vocento
- Founder: Torcuato Luca de Tena y Álvarez-Ossorio
- Publisher: Catalina Luca de Tena
- Editor: Bieito Rubido Ramonde
- Founded: 1 January 1903; 123 years ago
- Political alignment: Conservatism, monarchism
- Language: Spanish
- Headquarters: Juan Ignacio de Tena 7, Madrid, Spain
- Country: Spain
- Circulation: 85,000 (2024)
- Website: abc.es

ABC (Spanish: [aˈβeθe]) is a Spanish national daily newspaper. Along with El Mundo and El País, it is one of Spain's three newspapers of record.

== History and profile ==
ABC was first published in Madrid on 1 January 1903 by Torcuato Luca de Tena y Álvarez-Ossorio. The founding publishing house was Prensa Española, which was led by the founder of the paper, Luca de Tena. The paper started as a weekly newspaper, turning daily in June 1905. In 1928, ABC had two editions, one for Madrid and the other for Seville. The latter was named ABC de Sevilla.

On 20 July 1936, shortly after the Spanish Civil War began, ABC in Madrid was seized by the republican government, which changed the paper's politics to support the Republicans. The same year, Blanco y Negro, a magazine, became its supplement. The ABC printed in Seville was supportive of the Nationalists. In 1939, ABC in Madrid was given back to its original owners by Francisco Franco. During this period the paper was one of two major dailies in the country together with La Vanguardia Española.

ABC publishes in compact-sized stapled sheets, noticeably smaller than the loose tabloid format favoured by most Spanish dailies, including El País and El Mundo. Its cover distinctively features a full-size picture. In the late 1970s and 1980s, ABC had close connections with first Popular Alliance and later Popular Party. In the 1990s, the publisher of ABC was Editorial Española. The paper later moved from its historic landmark offices in Madrid by Paseo de la Castellana, which is now a shopping mall. The paper is part of Grupo Vocento, which also owns El Correo Español, El Diario Vasco, La Verdad and Las Provincias, among others.

=== Editorial stance ===
ABC is known for generally supporting conservative political views, and defending the Spanish monarchy. The paper also has a right-wing stance. Its director since 1983, Luis María Ansón, left the paper in 1997; he founded another daily, La Razón, which initially catered to even more conservative readers. Historically, it was noted in its heavy use of photography, and the front page is typically a large photo taking up to one third of the area. It has been recognized for its coverage of Spanish culture and arts.

=== Archives ===
On 25 September 2009, ABC made its complete archives, dating back to 1903, available online, giving modern readers a chance to see contemporaneous news about events such as the Spanish Civil War or Francisco Franco's death.

== Circulation and readership ==
In February 1970 ABC had a circulation of 212,536 copies. It was 178,979 copies in February 1975, 171,382 copies in 1976, 145,162 copies in 1977. and 126,952 copies in 1978. The circulation of the paper was 135,380 copies in February 1980.

The 1993 circulation of ABC was 334,317 copies, making it the second-best-selling newspaper in Spain. In 1994. it was again the second-best-selling newspaper in the country with a circulation of 321,571 copies. In the period of 1995–1996 the paper had a circulation of 321,573 copies, making again it the second-best-selling paper in the country.

The circulation of ABC was 292,000 copies in 2001 and 262,874 copies in 2002. The paper had a circulation of 263,000 copies in 2003, being the fourth best-selling newspaper in the country. Based on the findings of the European Business Readership Survey ABC had 5,685 readers per issue in 2006. Between June 2006 and July 2007 the daily had a circulation of 230,422 copies. The 2008 circulation of the paper was 228,258 copies. It was 243,154 copies between July 2010 and June 2011.

== See also ==
- List of national newspapers
