= Diario Sur =

Spanish daily newspaper in Málaga, Spain

- Type: Daily newspaper
- Format: Broadsheet
- Owner(s): Prensa Malagueña, S.A.
- Editor: José Antonio Frías Ruiz
- Founded: February 1937
- Language: Spanish
- Headquarters: Málaga, Spain
- Circulation: 15,000 (2024)
- Website: www.diariosur.es

Diario Sur (also called SUR; lit. 'Southern Daily') is a regional newspaper of Málaga, Spain. It is owned by the Prensa Malagueña, S.A., owned by Grupo Vocento.

== History and profile ==
The newspaper was founded in February 1937. Initially it was called Arriba but soon rechristened SUR, taking its name from that of a national paper. It has its headquarters in Málaga.

In March 1984, upon the liquidation of Medios de Comunicación Social del Estado, which it was a part of, the workers of SUR took control of the organization, a group of 1,500 shareholders, making it the only state media corporation to be acquired by its workers. It was a limited company and had 35% of the paper. The rest of its shares belonged to Luis Pagan, President of the County Council of Malaga, and to Manuel Martin Almendro, the President of the Chamber of Commerce.

In 1989, the company merged with Correo (now owned by the conservative Grupo Vocento) under the name Prensa Malagueña, S.A. creating the head of a local multimedia group that included television (Canal Málaga) and radio (Punto Radio Málaga), as well as the free Qué Pasa, the SUR in English and the Costa del Golf. The SUR Deutsche Ausgabe was discontinued on 2 January 2026.
