= Forner =

Forner is a surname. Notable people with the surname include:

- Juan Bautista Pablo Forner, (1756–1799), Spanish satirist and scholar, called to the bar at Madrid in 1783
- Lola Forner (born 1960), Spanish film actress, chosen Miss Spain in 1979
- Raquel Forner (1902–1988), Argentine painter known for her expressionist works
- Sandro Forner (born 1970), Brazilian football coach and former player
