= Francisco Mariano Nipho =

Spanish writer and journalist (1719–1803)

Francisco Mariano Nipho (10 June 1719 – 10 January 1803), also known as Francisco Mariano Nipho Cagigal, was a Spanish writer and journalist. He founded several periodicals, including the Diario Noticioso, Curioso-Erudito y Comercial, Público y Económico., which is commonly considered as Spain's first modern newspaper.

== Early life and career ==
Nipho was born on 10 June 1719 in Alcañiz, Aragon, Spain. His mother was from Pamplona, and his father, originally from Naples, served as governor of Maella. As a child, Nipho moved with his family to Madrid, where he lived and worked for the rest of his life.

Later in life, Nipho served as a censor during the late 18th century.

== Views on journalism ==
Nipho advocated for newspapers as a medium more accessible to the general public than books, owing to their lower cost. He viewed newspaper circulation as being important for cultural development and the dissemination of ideas. His editorial approach emphasized variety, reader engagement, accuracy, and substantive content.

Nipho's journalism was influenced by his Christian faith. He expressed reservations about the rationalist movement of his era, maintaining a theocentric perspective. His journalistic practice was guided by three principles: breadth of coverage, accuracy, and timeliness. He regarded education and the advancement of science as primary objectives of journalism.

== Journalism ==
On 1 February 1758, Nipho began a collaboration with Juan Antonio Lozano. With the support of Ferdinand VI, they published the first issue of the Diario Noticioso, Curioso-Erudito y Comercial, Público y Económico, also called Diario de Madrid, the first Spanish daily general news newspaper as well as one of Europe's first daily newspapers. Every issue of the Diario consisted of two sections: the first consisting of news and educational articles written for a popular audience, often including translations or summaries of foreign language articles; and the second section consisting of free classified advertisements, such as notices for lost and found items, job offers, and items for sale. In his introduction to the first printing, where he describes his overall plan for the newspaper, Nipho explains his reasoning for including a section for classified advertisements:

"Many individuals advised me to publish the advertisements in the journal every week, or at most twice a week, but I have not been able to accommodate this idea, for a very strong reason: many times there is a person in this court who need or are commissioned to buy some things for themselves or for people in their place. This person is only in court for a day, and not the entire week; so if they do not come, or are not in Madrid on the day of publication of the journal, they will find that the notices communicated through it will be late or not timely. For this reason, someone who wishes to sell some jewelry or furniture may lose the chance to find a good buyer in the aforementioned visitor. Moreover, someone who today has money may need it tomorrow; thus, by publishing the journal every working day, its advertisements are useful to all. A maid or servant will also suffer from a week-long delay; but by making the journal available to the public every day, excepting those of strict religious observance, they may more easily accommodate themselves, and achieve the relief which we hope to provide them through this medium: in any case this journal will be published every working day for the benefit of all."

In 1759, Nipho sold his stake in Diario printing privileges. The Diario would continue to be published until 1918.

In the following years, Nipho started several other journalism projects, most of which were short-lived:

- El Caxón de sastre (1760–1761), reportedly the first work in Spain sold by subscription, collected literary fragments and articles on aesthetics, morality, society, and culture.
- El Duende Especulativo (1761), a criticism of Madrid customs.
- El murmurador imparcial (1761), an anthology of literary texts.
- La Estafeta de Londres (1762), a weekly publication on various subjects drawn from English newspapers.
- El Diario estrangero (1763), a weekly publication that collected literary news from Europe and included theater criticism from Madrid.
- El Pensador cristiana (1763) and El hablador juicioso y crítico imparcial (1763), weekly publications translated works by the Jesuit Juan Busseo (in the first) and Abbot Langlet (in the second).
- El Correo general, histórico, literario y económico de la Europa (1763), a weekly general news publication.
- El novelero de los estrados y tertulias (1764), a weekly publication translated seven novels by Marmontel and one by Matías de los Reyes, a 17th-century writer.
- El escolar Investigación (1764), translated works on the arts, laws, and sciences.
- El Bufón de la Corte (1767) (transl. 'The Court Jester'), a satirical weekly published by Nipho under the pseudonym "Joseph de la Serna".

== Death ==
Nipho died on 10 January 1803, in Madrid, Spain.
