= El Robespierre Español =

Political magazine in Spain (1811–1812)

- Editor: Fernández Sardino; María del Carmen Silva
- Categories: Political magazine
- Frequency: Irregular
- Founder: Fernández Sardino
- Founded: 1811
- First issue: March 1811
- Final issue: July 1812
- Country: Spain
- Based in: Isla de León
- Language: Spanish

El Robespierre Español (Spanish: The Spanish Robespierre) was a political magazine with the subtitle, amigo de las leyes: o questiones atrevidas sobre la España. Although it was published just for one year from 1811 to 1812, the magazine is significant being the first Spanish magazine which was edited by a woman, María del Carmen Silva.

== History and profile ==
The first issue of El Robespierre Español which was irregularly published appeared in March 1811. Fernández Sardino, husband of Carmen Silva, was the founder of the magazine and had been also the editor-in-chief, but he was arrested due to his alleged anti-patriotic activities during the War of Independence. Then Carmen Silva assumed the post. The magazine was based in Isla de León, today Cádiz.

El Robespierre Español adopted an Aristotelian approach towards revolution and described it as a “declaration of public opinion through deeds.” This definition was given in the magazine as a reason for the overthrow of the despotic governments in that such governments had been ruled without taking into consideration the public opinion. The magazine folded in July 1812.
