= José Pellicer de Ossau Salas y Tovar =

Spanish genealogist

José Pellicer
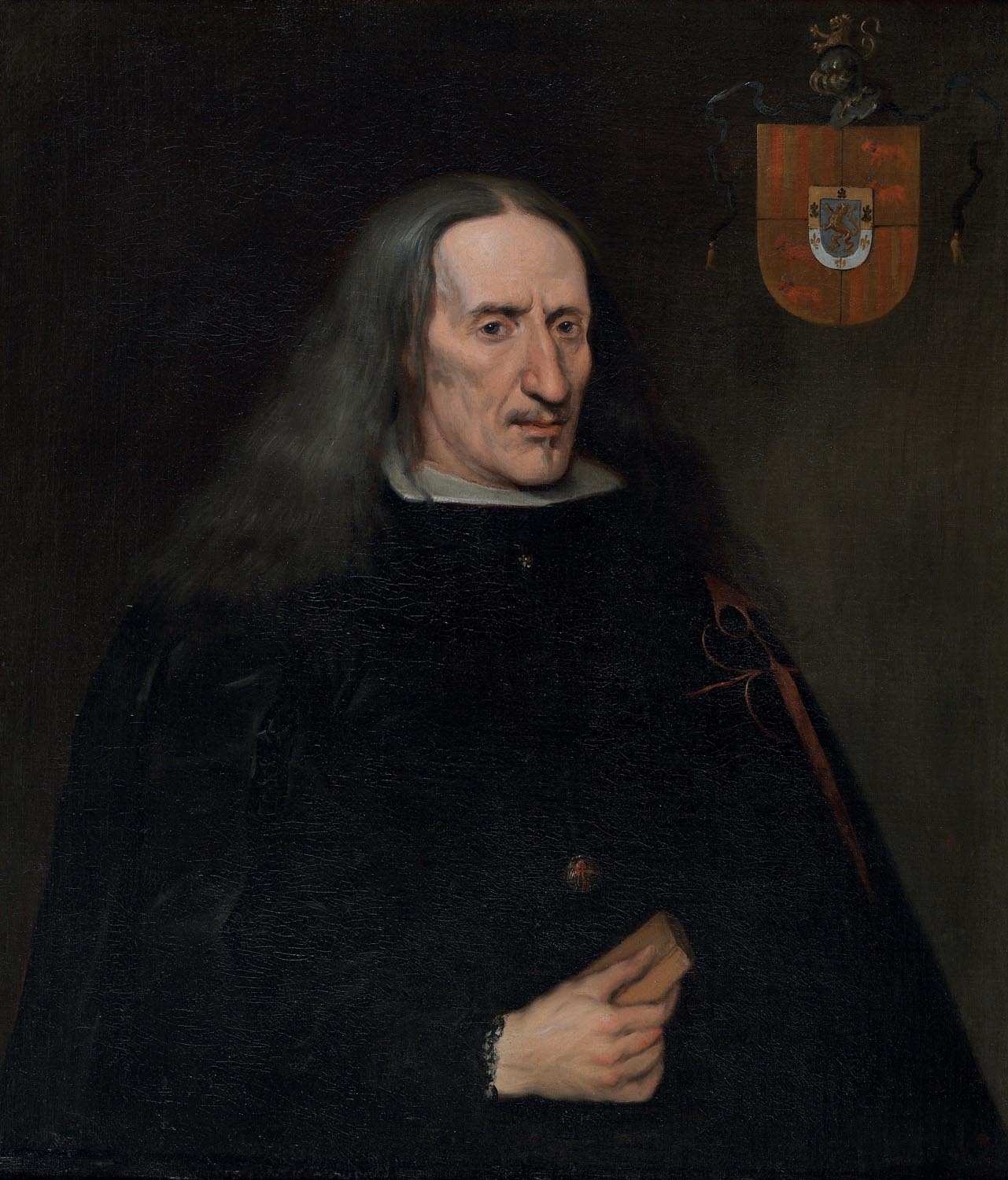
- José Pellicer de Ossau y Tovar, by Juan Carreño de Miranda.
- Born: José Pellicer de Ossau y Tovar; 26 April 1602; Zaragoza, Spain
- Died: 16 December 1679 (aged 77); Madrid, Spain
- Occupations: Poet, genealogist, and historian
- Writing career
- Period: Spanish Golden Age
- Movement: Culteranismo

José Pellicer de Ossau y Tovar (26 April 1602 – 16 December 1679) was a Spanish publicist for Gaspar de Guzmán, Count-Duke of Olivares, poet, genealogist, and historian of Castile and Aragon.

== Life ==
José Pellicer was born in Zaragoza on 26 April 1602. He studied Grammar in Consuegra under Juan García Genzor and later moved to Salamanca, where he studied Canon Law at the University. He went on to study Philosophy at the University of Alcalá; on 11 May 1620 he married Sebastiana de Ocáriz, by whom he had five children: Marco Antonio, Hipólito Raimundo, Enrique Manuel, Luisa María and Antonia Josefa.

Pellicer was a skilled linguist, trained in Latin, Greek, Hebrew, Italian, and French. His classical learning is displayed in his commentary on the works of Góngora. He held the title of chronicler of Castile and of Aragon from 1629 and 1637, respectively. In 1640, he was appointed to the exalted position of chief chronicler (cronista mayor) of Aragon, filling the vacancy left by the death of Bartolomé Leonardo de Argensola. At that time, Pellicer was also named official examiner of the histories and chronicles of all the kingdoms ruled by the Aragonese crown. He conceived the ambitious project of writing a general history of Spain that could supersede Juan de Mariana's classic Historiae de rebus Hispaniae.

An expert genealogist, he also stood out as a poet and literary critic. In 1630, he published an annotated edition of Luis de Góngora's most famous and difficult poems. His incisive analyses of Góngora's subtleties are of great assistance to any student of the poet. Pellicer corresponded on historical subjects with the archeologist and poet Rodrigo Caro. His wide and miscellaneous historical lore is manifested in his genealogical and other works, which show, however, more the spirit of an antiquarian than of a historian.

As a man of letters he is most known for his polemical writings, and his poems on historical and mythological subjects, such as the Rapto de Ganímedes (1624), or the Poema de Lucrecia (1622). Pellicer's poetry is deeply influenced by Góngora. His Spanish translation of John Barclay's Argenis (1626) was highly praised by Baltasar Gracián.

Pellicer is considered the greatest genealogist of seventeenth-century Spain. He exercised a truly modern critical spirit in genealogical studies, basing his work on written sources – published works, archival and public documents – and correcting the claims of contemporary printed works he found to be in error. His work was continued toward the end of the century by Luis de Salazar y Castro.

His Avisos históricos, which recount current events occurred from May 1639 to November 1644, are considered an early example of Spanish journalism. The Avisos históricos report a wide range of national and international news and represent an important source of information for the historian of early modern Spain. Pellicer's Avisos were published in Antonio Valladares' Semanario erudito, vols. 31-33 (Madrid, 1787–91).

Pellicer died in Madrid on 16 December 1679.

== Works ==
- El Fenix y su historia natural: escrita en veinte y dos exercitaciones, diatribes o capitulos. Madrid: en la Imprenta del Reyno. 1630.
- Lecciones solemnes a las obras de Don Luis de Gongora y Argote. Madrid: en la Imprenta del Reino (a costa de Pedro Coello). 1630.
- Anfiteatro de Felipe el Grande, Rey catolico de las Espanas, monarca soberano de las Indias de Oriente y Occidente. Madrid: Juan Gancalez. 1631.
- Obras de Quinto Septimio Florente Tertuliano, Presbítero de Cartago. Primera parte, con version parafrástica y argumentos castellanos. Barcelona: Gabriel Nogués. 1639.
- Bibliotheca formada de los libros i obras publicas de don Ioseph Pellicer de Ossau y Touar. Valencia: Geronimo Vilagrasa. 1671.
- Población, y lengua primitiva de España. Valencia: Benito Macé. 1672.
- Aparato a la monarchia antigua de las Españas en los tres tiempos del mundo, el adelon, el mithico y el historico. Vol. 1. Madrid: Benito Macè. 1673.
- Enrique Tierno Galván (ed.), Avisos históricos, Madrid, Taurus (col. Ser y Tiempo. Temas de España, vol. 31), 1965.
- Antonio López Ruiz; Antonio José López Cruces, eds. (2006). Defensa de España contra las calumnias de Francia (Satisfación a los engaños de su manifiesto, motiuo de los intentos del Rey Cristianísimo, verdad de los designios del Rey Católico, en las alteraciones de Europa) (PDF). Alicante: Biblioteca Virtual Miguel de Cervantes. Archived from the original on 12 January 2012.
- Francis Cerdán, ed. (1994). Honras fúnebres y fama póstuma de Fray Hortensio Paravicino. Toulouse: Helios.
