= Antonio Valladares de Sotomayor =

Spanish journalist, poet and writer

- Born: 30 July 1737; Rianxo, La Coruña, Spain
- Died: 1820 (aged 82–83); Madrid, Spain

Antonio Valladares de Sotomayor (1737–1820) was a Spanish journalist, poet, playwright, and writer.

He was Considered one of the most prolific literary figures of the second half of the 18th century and, together with Luciano Francisco Comella and Gaspar Zavala y Zamora, one of the most popular playwrights of that period, writing over 200 plays.

Valladares was also a fervent and enthusiastic defender of the Enlightenment in Spain. As a successful playwright and novelist, he was able to please his public while maintaining a certain literary standard. The writer and journalist Ramón de Mesonero Romanos referring to Valladares as a "man with quite a high level of erudition and good taste".

== Biography ==
Valladares was born into a family of Galician hidalgos in 1737. Little is known about his life or education until he moved to Madrid in 1760.

Once in Madrid, in order to maintain a lifestyle in accordance with his own words, "honor heredado en su cuna" ("the honour inherited from the cradle"), he began to write plays and publish articles. His vast output earned him the negative criticism of leading literary figures, such as Juan Pablo Forner and Leandro Fernández de Moratín, of being just another, of many, hack writers.

He became the administrator of the postal service in Osuna in 1785 and that same year he also became a member of the Economic Society of Friends of the Country in that city. Two years later, he founded the Semanario Erudito (1787-1791), a profitable publication which also earned him prestige.

== Semanario Erudito ==
The publication, whose full title was Semanario erudito, que comprehende varias obras inéditas críticas, morales, instructivas, políticas, históricas, satíricas y jocosas, de nuestros mejores autores, antiguos y modernos, published in Madrid, ran to 34 volumes.

It published works of criticism as well as moral, instructional, political, historical, satirical and humorous content by leading historical and literary figures of the age (Quevedo, Macanaz, and Burriel, etc.), some of them unpublished until then.

However, in 1791, just before the demise of the Floridablanca government, the prohibition of all periodicals, left Valladares ruined for the rest of his life.

=== Nuevo Semanario Erudito ===
In 1816, Valladares managed to bring out two volumes of Nuevo semanario erudito, compuesto de obras inéditas, críticas, políticas, históricas y morales de nuestros mejores autores antiguos y modernos, y obras exóticas, pero muy instructivas, puestas en nuestro idioma.

== Later works ==
As well as several failed attempts to re-establish his Seminario, between 1797 and 1807 Valladares wrote nine printed volumes of a novel, La Leandra, published in fascicles.

He also returned to writing plays and, in 1804 was granted a licence to publish Almacén de frutos literarios inéditos, which was prohibited on publication.

In 1815, he published the first two volumes of Tertulias de invierno en Chinchón. In 1818 he managed to sell, for 18,000 reales, his vast collection of manuscripts, which he had previously tried to publish, to no avail, despite having been granted the corresponding royal privilege, to Francisco Javier de Burgos, then a journalist and a future afrancesados and liberal who went on to become Interior minister. With those proceeds, he was able to publish volumes III and IV of his Tertulias.

== Pen names ==
Valladares wrote under several pen names: Anastasio Valderosal y Montedoro, Anselmo Tovalina Ordaso de Tiroa, Valerio Llamas Dávalos y Resa, Leonardo Evaristo Lasa y Montado, Thomas Valerio Roldan de Santoyoa and Antonio Valdasreal and Antonio Resaldoval Tosoyorma.
