= Diario de Pontevedra =

Spanish newspaper

- Type: Daily newspaper
- Format: Compact
- Owner: El Progreso Communication Group
- Publisher: El Progreso
- Editor: Miguel Ángel Rodríguez
- Founded: 1 April 1879
- Political alignment: Centrism
- Language: Spanish; Galician
- Headquarters: Pontevedra, Spain
- Circulation: 40,000
- Sister newspapers: El Progreso
- ISSN: 2386-4109
- Website: diariodepontevedra.es

The Diario de Pontevedra is a Spanish newspaper published in the city of Pontevedra since 1968, owned since 1999 by the El Progreso group, which also publishes El Progreso de Lugo.

It is an eminently local and provincial newspaper, focused on the region of Pontevedra. It has branches in Marín, Bueu, Poio, Sanxenxo, O Grove, Vilagarcía de Arosa, Caldas de Reis, Vigo, Lalín and A Estrada.

== History ==
In the past there have been several newspapers under the title of Diario de Pontevedra. A first publication appeared on the streets in June 1879, under the direction of Claudio Cuveiro, although the publication had a short existence; it ceased a few years later, in October. In 1887, a newspaper was once again published under the title Diario de Pontevedra. Originally a publication close to the Liberal Party, during the period of the Second Republic it held ultra-conservative positions and came to align itself with the most right-wing sector of the CEDA. It would continue to be published until 1939, being suspended after the end of the civil war.

On 15 September 1963, this newspaper was recovered for the city, born under the initiative of the Chamber of Commerce of Pontevedra. Emilio González de Hoz was at the head of the board of directors, with Enrique Paredes as Director. This publication, however, ceased publication in September 1967 due to financial problems.

On 2 April 1968, the workers of Diario de Pontevedra, in an attempt to make the newspaper economically and commercially viable, set up an industrial production cooperative. This formula was maintained until the Diario was incorporated into El Progreso Communication Group.

The Diario de Pontevedra, once fully incorporated into the El Progreso group, under the presidency of Blanca García Montenegro, has become one of the fastest growing newspapers in Spain, staffed by a group of young people, highly qualified in journalism as well as in management and marketing.

== Directors ==
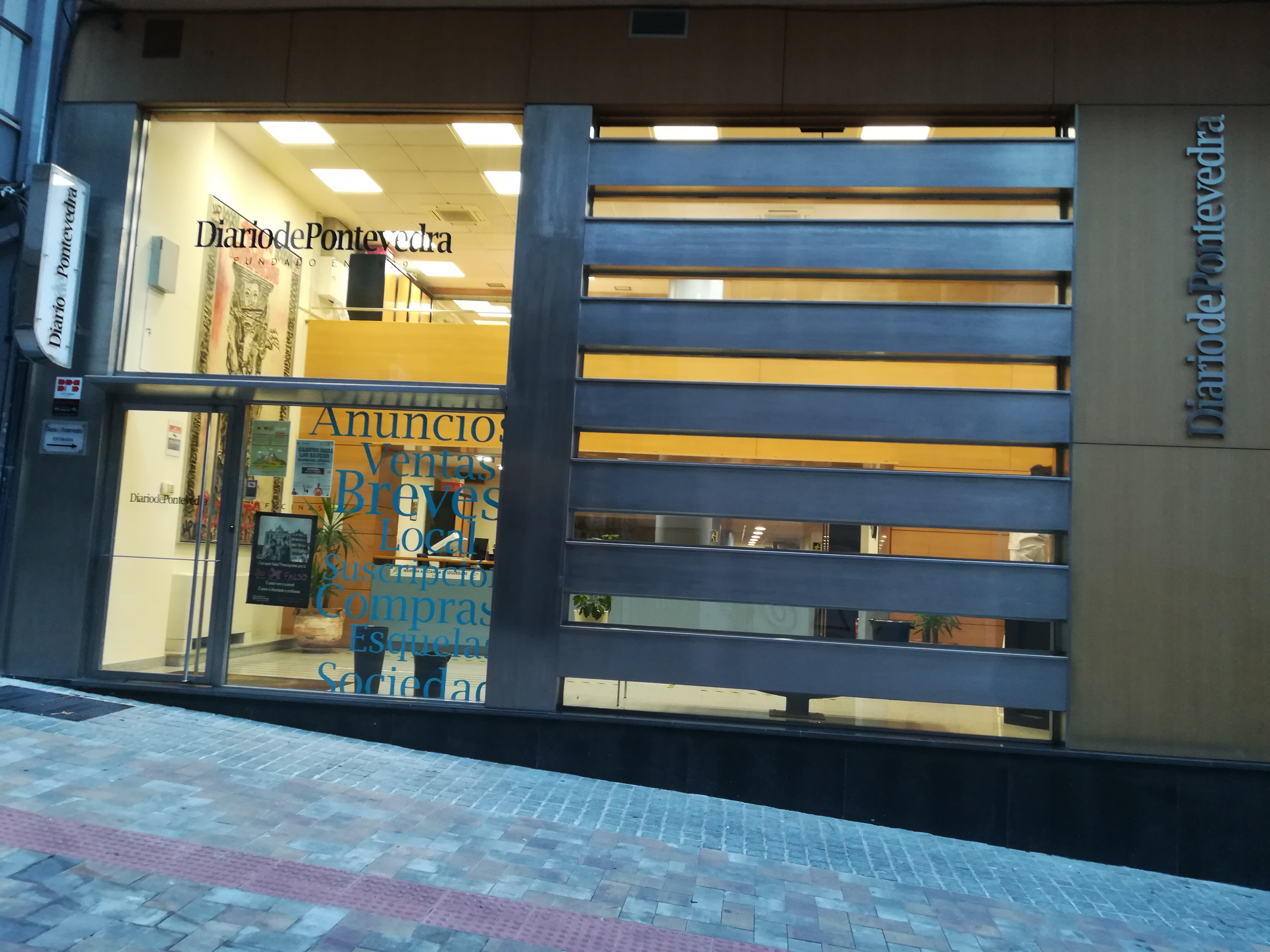
Headquarters of Diario de Pontevedra at Lepanto Street 5

- Pedro Antonio Rivas Fontenla (1968–1995)
- José Luís Adrio Poza (1995–2000)
- Antón Galocha (2000–2013)
- Pedro Antonio Pérez Santiago (2013–2016)
- Miguel Ángel Rodríguez (2016–present)

== Bibliography ==
- Checa Godoy, Antonio (1989). Prensa y partidos políticos durante la II República. Universidad de Salamanca. ISBN 84-7481-521-5.
- Odriozola, Antonio (1989). Las imprentas de Pontevedra en el siglo XIX. Diputación Provincial de Pontevedra.
- Santos Gayoso, Enrique (1990). Historia de la Prensa Gallega 1800–1986. Vol. I. Sada: Do Castro. ISBN 84-7492-489-8.
