= Isla de León =

Historical name for land between Cádiz and the Iberian Peninsula

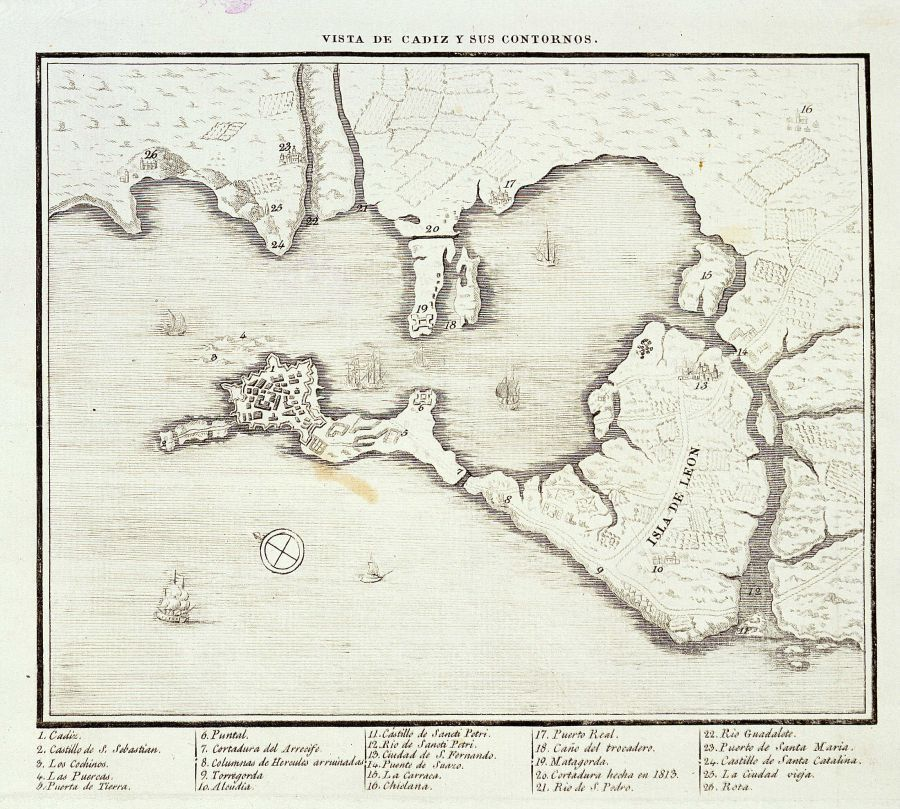
La Isla de León, still totally separated from the Iberian Peninsula

The Isla de León is a historical name for the piece of land between the city of Cádiz and the Iberian Peninsula, in Spain.

== Renaming ==
In 1813, it was renamed San Fernando in honor of King Fernando VII of Spain for his courage in the defense of the city during the Siege of Cádiz (Peninsular War) by the Napoleonic army.
