= Canarias7 =

Spanish language daily newspaper

- Type: Daily newspaper
- Format: Tabloid
- Owner: Informaciones Canarias S.A.
- Publisher: Informaciones Canarias S.A.
- Editor: Francisco Suárez Álamo
- Founded: 2 October 1982; 43 years ago
- Language: Spanish
- Headquarters: Las Palmas de Gran Canaria
- Website: canarias7.es

Canarias7 is a Spanish language daily newspaper headquartered in Las Palmas de Gran Canaria, Canary Islands. It was first published on 2 October 1982. The paper is part of Informaciones Canarias S.A. (Inforcasa).

== See also ==
- La Provincia, another daily newspaper in the Canary Islands
