= Luciano Comella =

Spanish playwright

Luciano Francisco Comella (1751–1812) was a Spanish playwright. Author of more than two hundred plays, he was one of the most prolific dramatists of the late eighteenth century.

His work is inspired by the zarzuela and operetta which were really popular at the time. Numerous of his plays emphasis on war and Spanish middle classes.
