= Juan Bautista Pablo Forner =

Spanish writer (1756–1799)

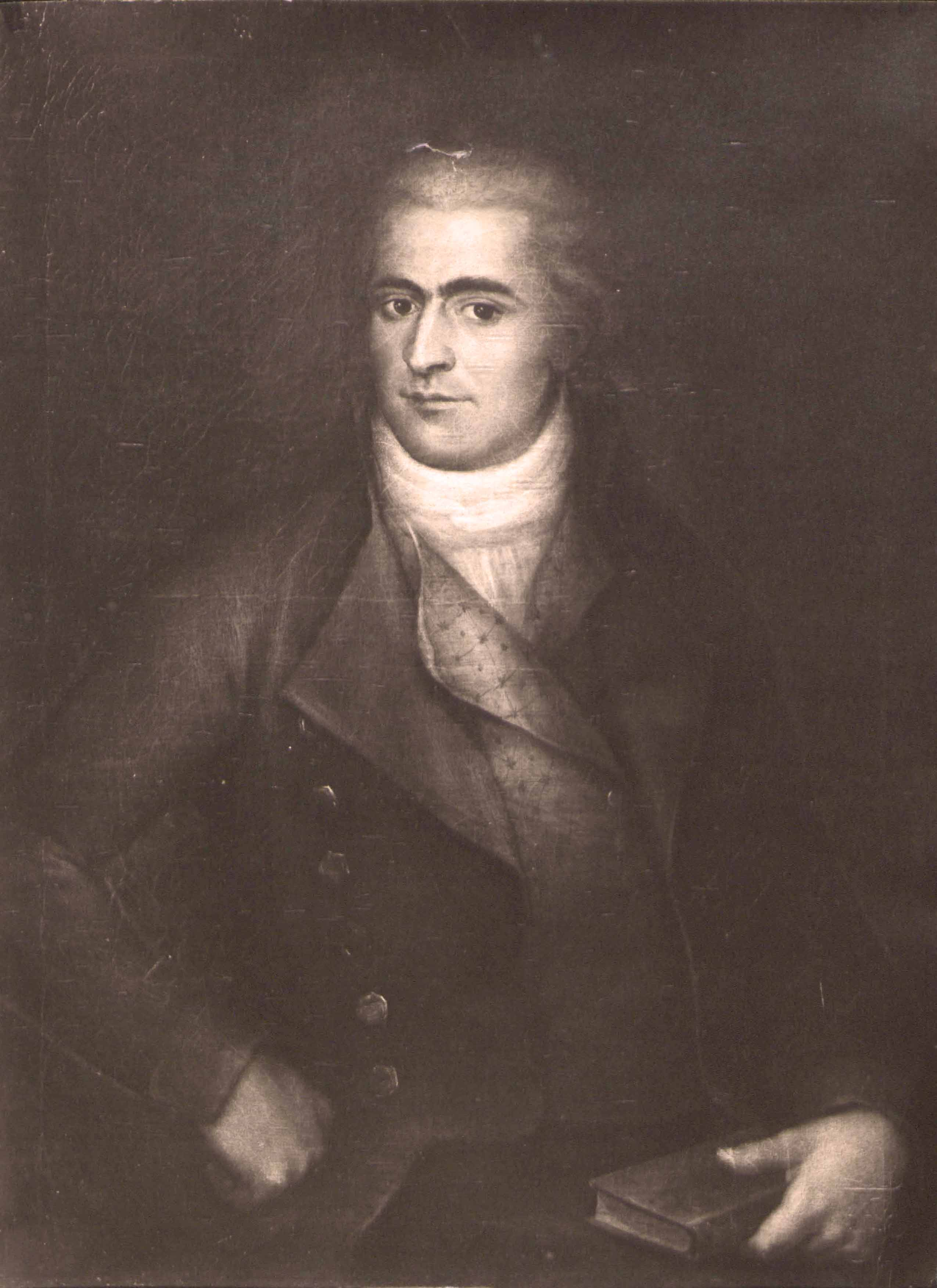
Juan Bautista Pablo Forner

Juan Bautista Pablo Forner (17 or 23 February 1756 – 7 March 1799), Spanish a satirist and scholar, was born in Mérida (Badajoz Province). He studied at the University of Salamanca and was called to bar in Madrid in 1783.

During the next few years under the pseudonyms of Tome Cecial, Pablo Segarra, Don Antonio Varas, Bartolo, Pablo Ignocausto, El Bachiller Regañadientes, and Silvio Liberio Forner was engaged in a series of polemics with García de la Huerta, Iriarte and other writers; the violence of his attacks was so extreme that he was finally forbidden to publish any controversial pamphlets, and was transferred to a legal post at Seville. In 1796 he became crown prosecutor at Madrid, where he died on 7 March 1799.

Forner's brutality is almost unexampled, and his satirical writings give a false impression of his powers. His Oración apologética por la España y su mérito literario (1786) is an excellent example of learned advocacy, far superior to similar efforts made by Carlo Denina and Antonio Cavanilles; and his posthumous Exequias de la lengua castellana (printed in the Biblioteca de autores españoles, vol. LXIII.) testifies to his scholarship and taste.
