= Arjona =

Arjona may refer to:

- Arjona, Bolívar, Colombia
- Arjona, Spain
- Taifa of Arjona, a medieval taifa kingdom in Spain
- Arjona (plant), genus of plants in the family Schoepfiaceae

== People with the surname ==
- Adria Arjona (born 1992), Puerto Rican actress
- Adrià Arjona (born 1996), Spanish footballer
- Beatriz Arjona (born 1983), Spanish actress
- Belén Arjona (born 1985), Spanish singer
- Jaime Homero Arjona (1906–1967), American linguist and educator
- Manuel María de Arjona (1771–1820), Spanish poet
- Maria José Arjona (born 1972), Colombian performance artist
- Ricardo Arjona (born 1964), Guatemalan singer-songwriter
- William Arjona (born 1979), Brazilian volleyball player
