= Spanish Enlightenment literature =

Literary movement

Spanish Enlightenment literature is the literature of Spain written during the Age of Enlightenment.

During the 18th century a new mentality emerged (in essence a continuation of the Renaissance) which swept away the old values of the Baroque era and was given the name the Enlightenment. This movement is based on a critical spirit, on the predominance of reason and experience, philosophy and science being the most valued sources of knowledge. The period is also known as the Age of Enlightenment or the Age of Reason. In short, human happiness was pursued by means of culture and progress. Art and literature began to move towards a new classicism (Neoclassicism). Expressions of feeling were avoided, norms and academic rules were followed, and balance and harmony were valued. By the end of the century, so much rigidity led to a reaction in the form of a return to the world of feelings; this movement is known as Pre-Romanticism.

== Historical context ==
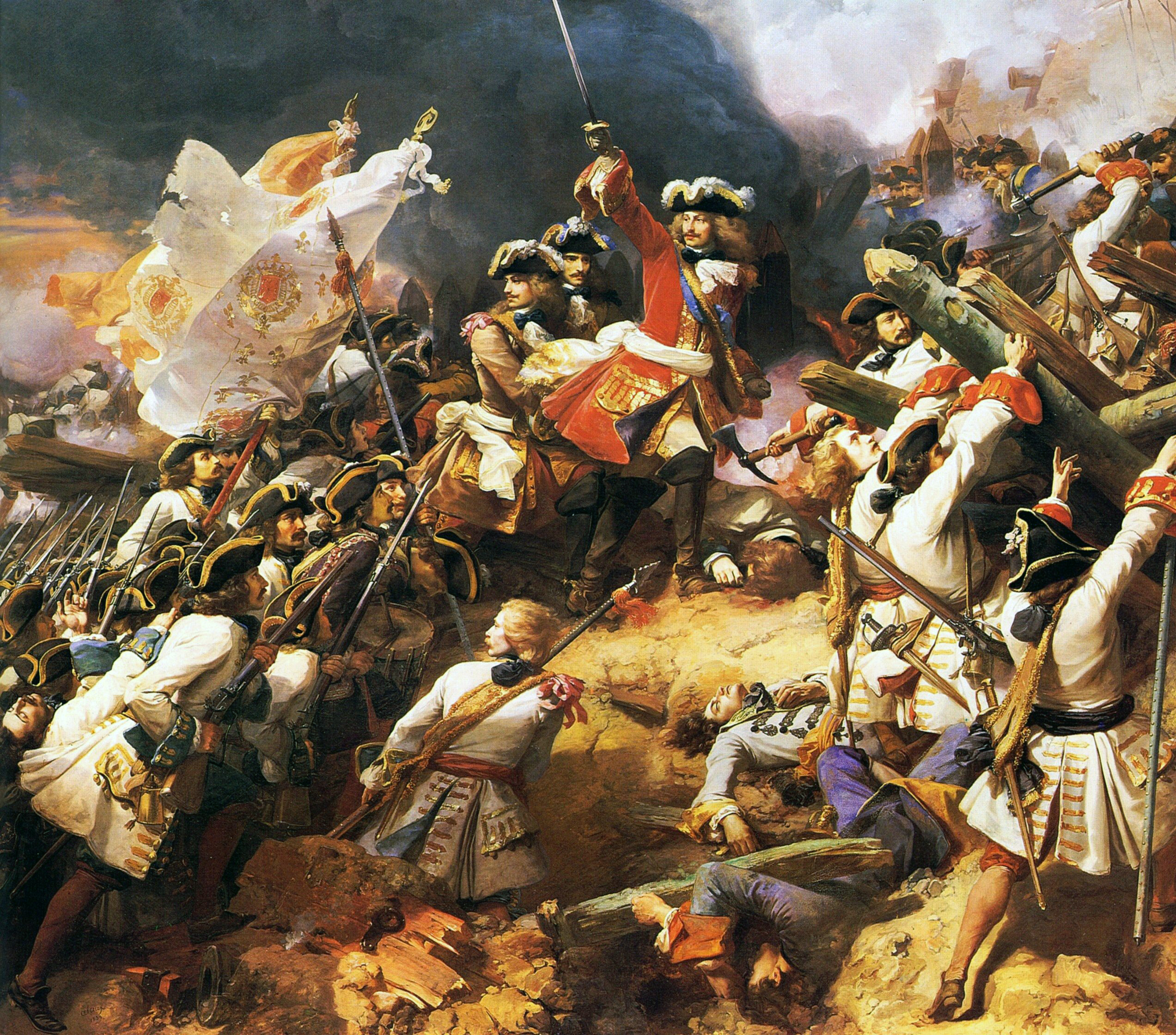
The Battle of Denain by Jean Alaux, 1839

The 18th century began with the War of the Spanish Succession (1701–1714). The European powers, worried about the hegemonic power of the French King Louis XIV, together with his grandson Philip V of Spain, whom Charles II had named heir to the throne, formed the Grand Alliance and endorsed the attempt of Archduke Charles of Austria to accede to the crown. After the Treaty of Utrecht, Philip V (1700–1746) was recognized as King of Spain, although he later lost his dominions in Menorca and Gibraltar. In 1724, he abdicated in favor of his son Louis I, but when the latter died months later, he returned to assume the Spanish throne. During his reign, he developed a centralist policy and reorganized the Public Treasury.

After the death of Philip V, Ferdinand VI (1746–1759) succeeded him, who, with ministers like Carvajal and the Marquess of Ensenada, improved the country's communications and road network, encouraged naval constructions and favored the development of the sciences.

After the reign of Ferdinand VI, his half-brother Charles III succeeded him on the throne. The prototype of an enlightened monarch, he relied on the support of important ministers, like José Moñino, Pedro Rodríguez, Pedro Pablo Abarca de Bolea, Jerónimo Grimaldi and Leopoldo de Gregorio. Without leaving the model of the Ancien Régime, he modernized the country, repopulated the Sierra Morena, and favored education, commerce and public works.

During the reign of Charles IV, the French Revolution broke out in 1789. Because of his weakness and the ambition of Minister Godoy, he had to abdicate in favour of his son Ferdinand VII, after the invasion by the French in 1808.

== The Enlightenment in Europe ==
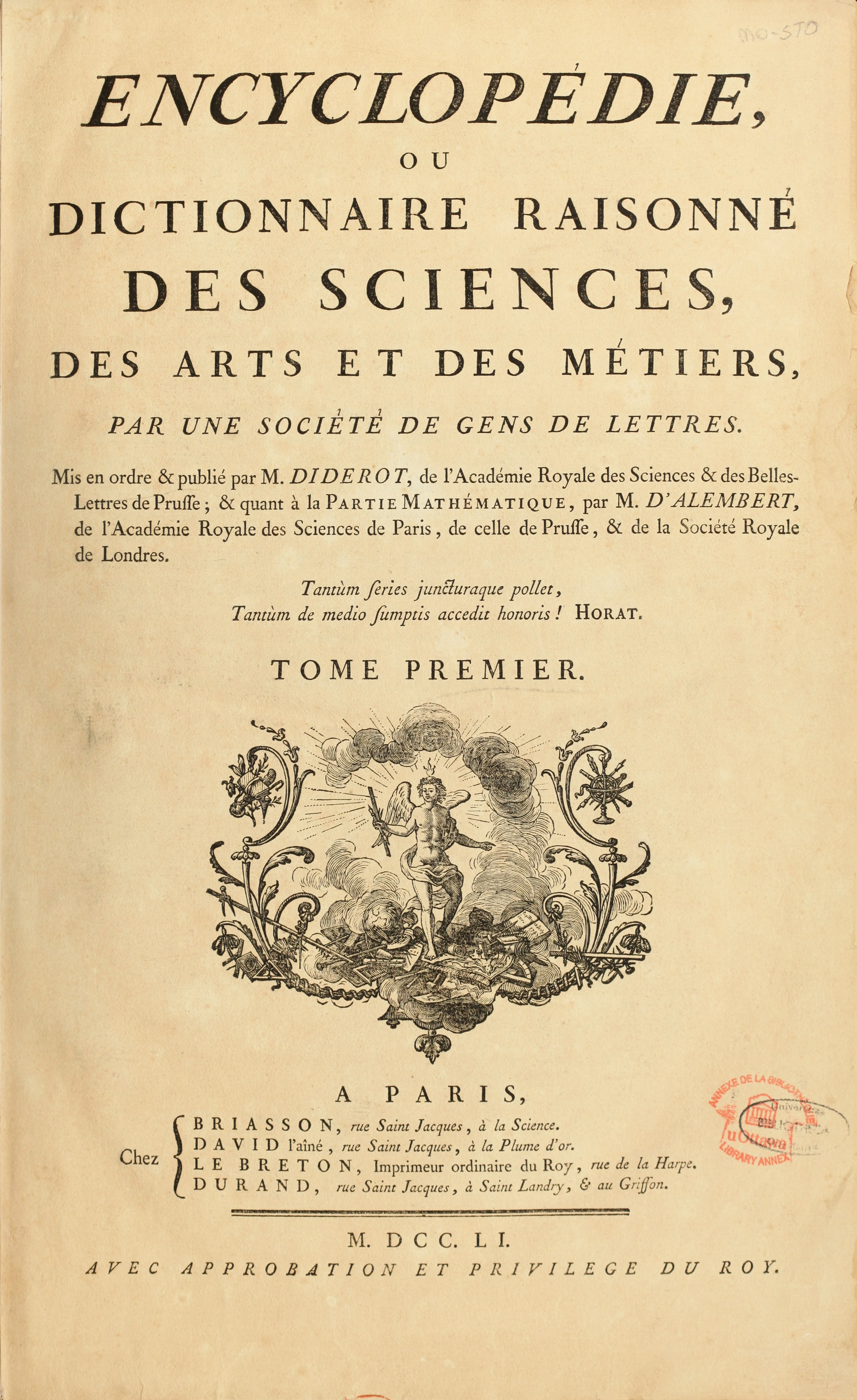
Cover of L'Encyclopédie (1751)

In the last decades of the 17th century, the Ancien Régime, based on the predominance of the ecclesiastical, military and aristocratic classes, entered into crisis in Europe. In this century, Europe critically reviewed the established order. As opposed to previous thought, it proposed reason as the universal method of knowledge, systematic criticism, and promoted the experimental method and studies based on reason itself as the basis of the epistemology that sustained it, as opposed to the argument of authority that sustained thought in previous centuries.

Knowledge moved from courtly gatherings to bourgeois salons, cafés or cultural institutions. The need was felt to travel for study or pleasure, to learn other languages, to practice sports to strengthen the body or to improve the living conditions of the citizens.

In this new attitude, the enlightened person is a philanthropist who cares for others, and proposes and undertakes reforms in aspects related to culture and society. They defend religious tolerance, practice skepticism, and even go so far as to attack religions. In opposition to absolute monarchies, Montesquieu defended the foundations of modern constitutionalism and the separation of the legislative, executive and judicial powers. The enlightened wanted to enjoy freedom and to choose their own rulers. All this inspired the motto of the French Revolution: Freedom, Equality, Fraternity.

The Enlightenment theories had their origin in England, although they reached their peak in France, where they were collected in the Encyclopédie (1751–1772), edited by Jean Le Rond d'Alembert and Denis Diderot. In this work, they gathered all the existing knowledge of their time, in alphabetical order.

== The Enlightenment in Spain ==
=== Antecedents of reformism: the novatores of the 18th century ===
During the Habsburg period, Spain practically abandoned scientific studies, which were seen with suspicion and continuously persecuted by the Inquisition. The delay with regard to Europe was evident at the beginning of the 18th century. Nevertheless, some intellectuals since the end of the 17th century refused to abandon their research; not without risk, they were always up-to-date on European discoveries in astronomy, medicine, mathematics or botany. These scholars are the so-called novatores ('innovators', called so contemptuously). They spread the theories of Galileo Galilei, Kepler, Linnaeus and Isaac Newton. Among the novatores, Juan de Cabriada, Antonio Hugo de Omerique, Juan Caramuel, Martín Martínez, Tomás Vicente Tosca and Juan Bautista Corachán stand out. In the 18th century, the legacy they left was continued by other scientists like Jorge Juan, Cosme Bueno, and Antonio de Ulloa.

=== Adoption of the Enlightenment in Spain ===
After the War of Succession, the Bourbons considered Spain a nation submerged in misery and ignorance. The Iberian Peninsula barely had seven and a half million inhabitants. With a French political conception, Philip V fortified the monarchic power and promoted a process of centralization in the nation, abolishing the fueros and laws of Aragón and Catalonia. The Church maintained its dominance, although some religious orders like the Jesuits fell by the time of Charles III. On the other hand, the common people, made up of ranchers, crop farmers, civil servants and the marginalized, lacked rights. The monarchs gradually reduced some privileges of the hereditary aristocracy and adopted a regalist or critical position towards the church, with the intent of carrying out a series of basic reforms. At the end of century, the quality of life of the Spanish people had been improved, as demonstrated by the increase in population of almost three million inhabitants, a figure which is nevertheless smaller than that of other European countries.

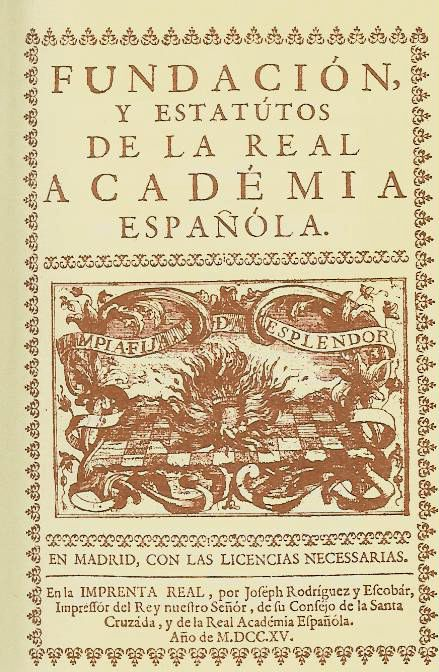
Cover of the first edition of Foundation and statutes of the Royal Spanish Academy (1715)

Enlightenment ideas entered Spain through various channels:

- The diffusion of the ideas of some Enlightenment scholars, including Gregorio Mayans and Benito Jerónimo Feijoo, novatores of the 18th century.
- The propagation of French encyclopedist ideas (Rousseau, Voltaire, Montesquieu), in spite of the censorship of the time to avoid their introduction in the Peninsula and the vigilance of the Inquisition.
- The translation of French books of all genres and the hiring of foreign professors or scholars in certain subjects.
- Scholars and intellectuals' academic trips and knowledge of European life and customs.
- The appearance of newspapers or publications where enlightenment ideas were disseminated.
- The creation of a series of cultural institutions and economic societies of friends of the country aimed at promoting the cultural, social and economic progress of Spain through the reform of traditional practices. The first of these societies was founded in the Basque Country in 1765, and soon spread throughout the nation. They were made up of enlightened people from the aristocracy, the bourgeoisie and the clergy. In this century organizations of great importance were created, such as the Royal Spanish Academy, founded for the benefit of the language, under the motto "it purifies, fixes and shines". The society aimed to establish norms for the correct use of language, and its first effort was devoted to the Diccionario de la lengua española (Dictionary of the Spanish Language), known then as the Diccionario de Autoridades (Dictionary of Authorities), in six volumes (1726–1739). The etymology of each word can be found in it, and each meaning is accompanied by a brief quotation from a famous writer (the authorities) that proves its existence and illustrates its use. Other institutions that emerged at the time were the Biblioteca Nacional de España (National Library, 1712), the Real Academia de la Historia (Royal Academy of History, 1736), the Real Jardín Botánico de Madrid (Royal Botanical Garden of Madrid, 1755), the Real Academia de Bellas Artes de San Fernando (Royal Academy of Fine Arts of San Fernando, 1751), the Reial Acadèmia de Bones Lletres de Barcelona (Royal Academy of the Good Writings of Barcelona, 1752) and the Museo del Prado (Museum of Prado, 1785).

The high point of the Enlightenment in Spain occurred during the reign of Charles III and its decline, around the time of the French Revolution (1789) and the Napoleonic invasion of the Iberian Peninsula (1808). The reformers, in spite of counting on the support of the Crown, did not obtain the recognition of the privileged groups; many were described as pro-French and accused of attacking Spanish traditions and religious education. After the French Revolution, some were persecuted and even imprisoned.

== Spanish in the 18th century ==
In this century, a struggle was waged in favor of clarity and naturalness of artistic language, in which many writers fought against the remnants of the Baroque style that still survived – that is to say, the use of artifice to which the late Baroque had come.

Latin was used in the universities as an academic language, but it was gradually replaced in that role. Spaniards wanted to return to the splendor of the Golden Age as a literary language, but for that it was necessary to develop forms of expression in accordance with the European experimental sciences, a task which was carried out by Feijoo, Sarmiento, Mayans, Jovellanos, Forner, and Capmany, among others. In 1813, after the War of Independence, the Board created by the Regency to carry out a general reform of education ordered the exclusive use of the Spanish in the university.

Many of the enlightened people, for the modernization of Spain, defended the introduction of the teaching of other languages (French, English, Italian) in the centers, and the translation of outstanding works into Castilian. The former was opposed by those who defended the priority of the classic languages (Latin and Greek) over modern languages, and the latter by those who rejected translations because they would introduce unnecessary foreign words into the Spanish language and would endanger its identity. Two positions thus arose: casticismo, which defended a pure language, without mixing vocabulary or strange turns of phrase, with words documented in the Authorities (the Royal Spanish Academy); and purismo, which was entirely opposed to the penetration of neologisms, mainly foreign ones, accusing its opponents of defiling the language.

== Stages of 18th-century literature ==
Three stages in 18th-century Spanish literature can be distinguished:

- Anti-baroquism (until approximately 1750): writers fought against the style of the late Baroque, considered excessively rhetorical and convoluted. Recreational literature is not cultivated, but writers were more interested in essays and satire, using the language with simplicity and purity.
- Neoclassicism (until the late 18th century): an interest in French and Italian classicism is seen. The writers also imitated ancient Greek and Roman classics and its peak extended from the reign of Ferdinand VI until well into the 19th century.
- Pre-Romanticism (late 18th and early 19th centuries): the influence of the English philosopher John Locke, as well as the French Étienne Bonnot de Condillac, Jean-Jacques Rousseau and Denis Diderot, led to a new sentiment, dissatisfaction with the tyranny of reason, which asserts the right of individuals to express their personal emotions (then repressed by the neoclassicals), among which is fundamentally love. This current heralded the decline of neoclassicism and opened the doors to Romanticism.

== Prose ==
Narrative is almost non-existent in Spain during this period. It is practically reduced to Vida, ascendencia, nacimiento, crianza y aventuras del Doctor Don Diego de Torres Villarroel by Diego de Torres Villarroel, or the story Historia del famoso predicador fray Gerundio de Campazas, alias Zotes by José Francisco de Isla.

Another modality of great influence in this time was the newspaper. Literary and scientific publications and publications of curiosities, including the Diario de los Literatos de España, El Censor and the Correo de Madrid contributed to the spread in Spain of the theories and the ideas of the time, establishing the principles of the Enlightenment.

In contrast, the essay, or in general, essayistic genres, is the dominant genre. This prose is partly educational and doctrinal, showing a desire to approach the problems of the moment and tending toward the reform of customs; it usually makes use of the epistolary form. On the other hand, it deals with the genres of historiography, what we would nowadays call human sciences and, in general, the sciences, since it should not be forgotten that the 18th-century and enlightened concept of literature embraces poetry and artistic literature as well as all science. The Spanish Universalist School of the 18th century defined the great current, largely composed of enlightened and expelled Jesuits, in regard to these genres.

=== Friar Benito Jerónimo Feijoo ===
The benedictine friar Benito Jerónimo Feijoo y Montenegro (Orense, 1676–Oviedo, 1764) had an Aristotelian formation. His works reached numerous editions and provoked many controversies, so many that Ferdinand VI, in an act of enlightened despotism, had to defend him by appointing him his honorary advisor and prohibiting attacks against his work and his person.

His knowledge was manifested in a multitude of essays that he grouped in the eight volumes of Teatro crítico universal (1727–1739) and in the five of Cartas eruditas y curiosas (1742–1760). Feijoo saw the need to write in order to bring Spain out of its backwardness; with this intention, he gave his work a didactic character, markedly Catholic, but with the intention that the new European currents would take root, at least in the educated classes. He was very critical of superstitions and false miracles.

Feijoo contributed to the consolidation of Castilian as a cultured language by defending its use against Latin, which still was used in universities. He also accepted the introduction of new words when necessary, no matter where they came from. His production covers very diverse fields like economy, politics, astronomy, mathematics, physics, history, religion, etc. His style was characterized by its simplicity, naturalness and clarity. For many critics, Spanish prose became modern with Feijoo.

=== Gaspar Melchor de Jovellanos ===
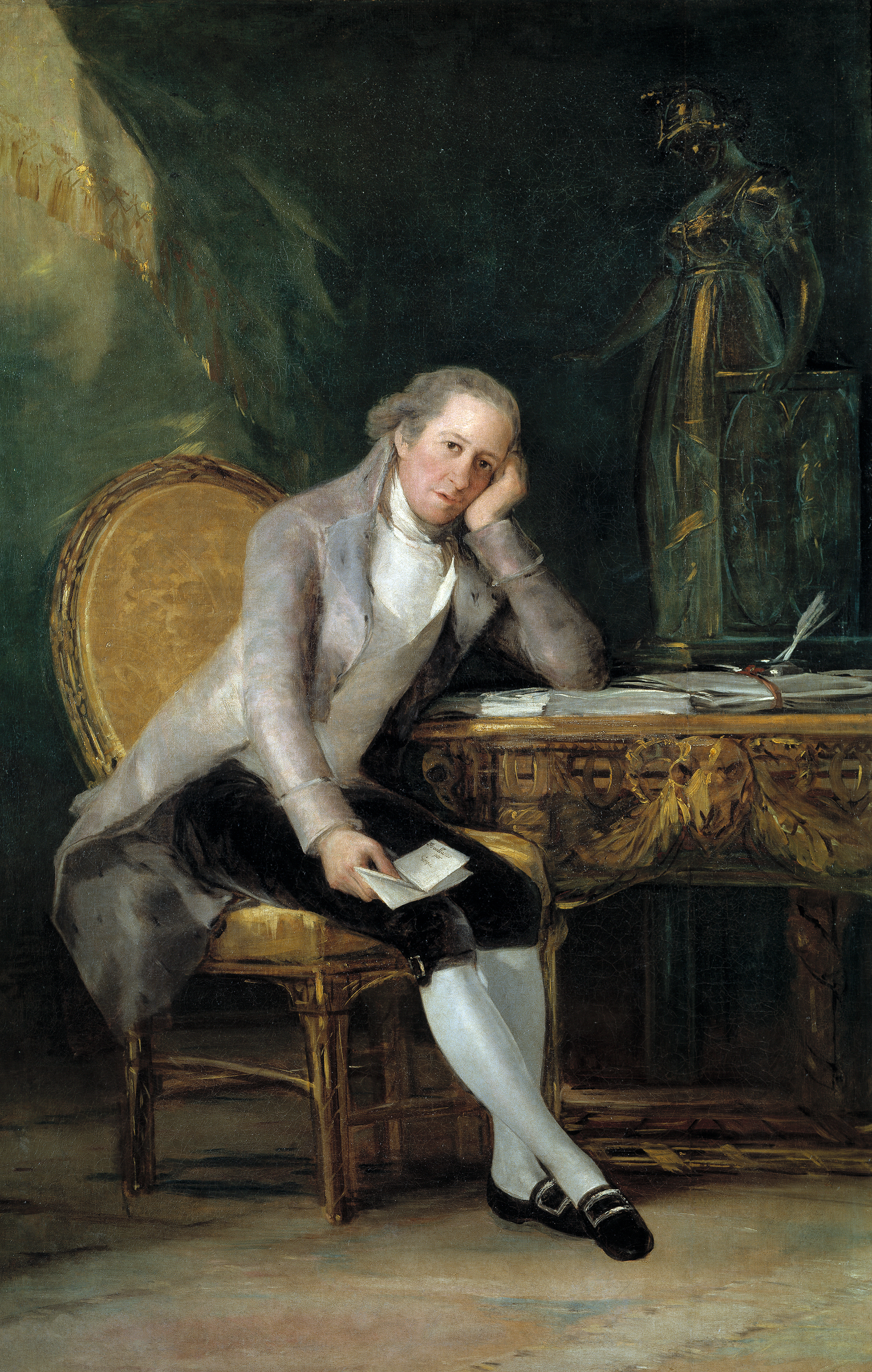
Jovellanos portrayed by Goya, 1798. El Prado Museum

Jovellanos (Gijón, 1744–Puerto de Vega, Asturias, 1811) is probably the most important essayist of the 18th century. Belonging to a wealthy family, he studied law and was assigned to Seville, where he made epistolary contact with the poetic school of Salamanca. In Madrid, as mayor of House and Court, his political activity increased steadily. After an exile, he was appointed by Manuel Godoy Minister of Grace and Justice, and later, Secretary of State. When he lost the confidence of the minister, he was imprisoned in Mallorca in Bellver Castle until the Tumult of Aranjuez, which overthrew Godoy, gave him back his freedom. In 1808 he took part in the Central Junta that confronted the Napoleonic army. He was pursued by the French and tried to move to Cadiz, but the inclement weather forced him to take refuge in the port of Vega de Navia, where he died.

Jovellanos began to write lyric poetry with the pastoral name (very common in his time) of Jovino, and with Enlightenment ideals. Like Cadalso, he satirized the uneducated aristocracy in his satire A Arnesto. But he soon tired of poetry, which he considered to be an adolescent game to which reason did not apply, and which was improper of a respectable man. Curiously, years later he invited in verse to the insurrection of 1808 in the Canto para los astures contra los franceses (Song for the Asturians against the French.)

He also composed El delincuente honrado, a neoclassical reformist drama. A law had been enacted that condemned to death the survivor of duels, considering the offender and the victim equally guilty; Jovellanos based his drama on this, because for him only the offender was guilty. The work follows the line of sentimental comedy, so admired in France, and its tone is already Pre-Romantic. Clarity, concision and sobriety are the characteristic features of the didactic work of Jovellanos.

=== José Cadalso ===
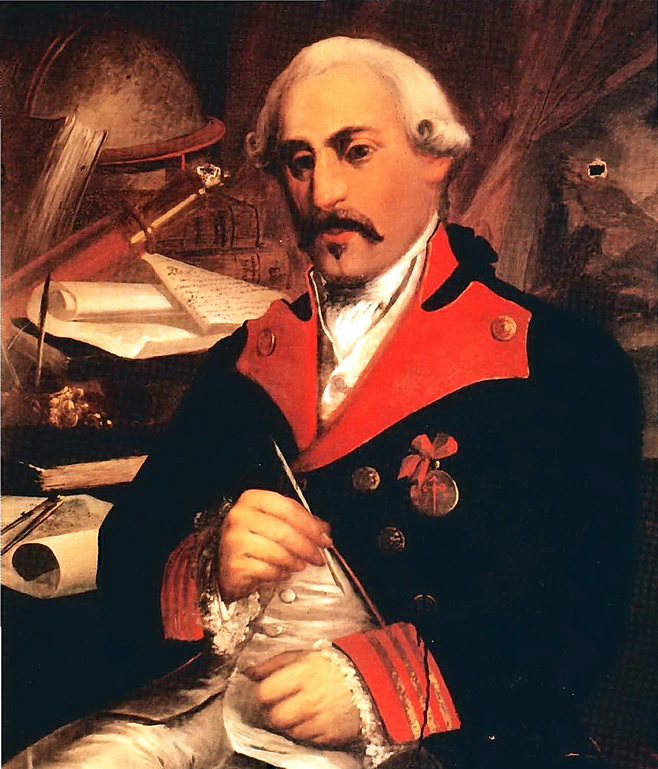
José Cadalso

José Cadalso y Vázquez de Andrade (1741–1782) is another of the great prose writers of the 18th century. He wrote important literary works, his most important creation being Cartas marruecas. It was said that he possessed a vast culture, probably enriched by his trips to England, France, Germany and Italy. He was a military man and obtained the rank of colonel. He was deeply in love with the actress María Ignacia Ibáñez, who died very early, in 1771, due to typhus. The excesses to which he indulged – Cadalso even tried to exhume her – earned him banishment to Salamanca (ordered so that he would be cured of his insanity). He was later assigned to Extremadura, Andalusia, Madrid and finally Gibraltar, where he died during the Great Siege of Gibraltar. His body was laid to rest in Santa Maria la Coronada Parish Church in San Roque, Cádiz.

As poet, and under the name of Dalmiro, he composed the work Ocios de mi juventud (1771). His love towards the actress María Ignacia Ibáñez brought him closer to the dramatic world. Although he wrote three tragedies, only one of them was performed, and with little success: Don Sancho García, conde de Castilla (1771). His prose work is, however, more extensive. In Noches lúgubres he narrates in dialogue the frustrated longing of the main character Tediato, to rescue the body of his beloved from the tomb. The book Los eruditos a la violeta is entirely eighteenth-century, in which he lashes out against false intellectuals, seven lessons that satirize those who pretend to know a lot by studying little.

Nevertheless, the Cartas marruecas (1789), published posthumously, are the most important of Cadalso's literary work. According to a model widely cultivated in France (for example, Montesquieu's Persian Letters), the author composes a book with ninety letters between Gazel, a moor who visits Spain, his Moroccan teacher and friend Ben-Beley, and Nuño Núñez, a Christian friend of Gazel. They comment on the historical past of Spain and its current life and judge the work of the rulers and the customs of the country.

== Lyric poetry ==
In 1737, Ignacio de Luzán collected the aesthetic ideas of Neoclassicism in his Poética. This style prevailed in Spain, imposing criteria of utility and service to humanity, along with the desire for aesthetic pleasure. Artistic ideals imported from France, "good taste" and restraint dominated, and feelings and passions were repressed. Subjection to norms was general, fleeing from spontaneity and imagination, which were replaced by didactic zeal.

Neoclassical poetry dealt with historical, genre and satirical themes. The Rococó variant, more luxurious and ornate, was dominated by pastoral themes that exalted pleasure and gallant love. Typical forms were odes, epistles, elegies and romances.

Important names in Spanish poetry are Juan Meléndez Valdés, the leading Spanish representative of Rococó, Nicolás Fernández de Moratín and the fabulists Tomás de Iriarte and Félix María de Samaniego.

Neoclassical literature was developed mainly in three cities: Salamanca, by people connected to its University; Seville, with the influence of its assistant (a position similar to that of mayor) Pablo de Olavide; and Madrid, around the Fonda de San Sebastián. In this way, the writers in that trend are grouped into schools or poetic groups: The Salmantine school, which included Cadalso, Meléndez Valdés, Jovellanos and Forner; the Sevillian school, which included writers Manuel María de Arjona, José Marchena, José María Blanco and Alberto Lista, who soon evolved into an early Romanticism (Pre-Romanticism); and the Madrilenian group, formed by Vicente García de la Huerta, Ramón de la Cruz, Iriarte, Samaniego and the Fernández de Moratíns.

=== The Salmantine school: Juan Meléndez Valdés ===
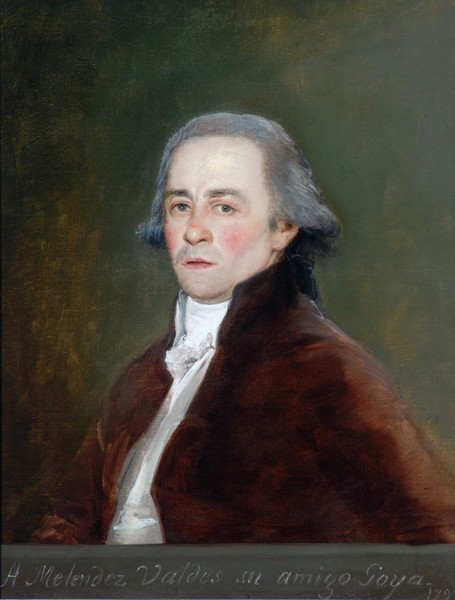
Juan Meléndez Valdés (1797) by Goya

Meléndez Valdés (Ribera del Fresno, Badajoz, 1754–Montpellier, France, 1814) is considered one of the best poets of the 18th century. He was a university professor in Salamanca, where he maintained friendships with Cadalso and Jovellanos. He worked as a jurist, occupying posts in Zaragoza, Valladolid and finally in Madrid, where he worked as public prosecutor of the Supreme Court. Once his mentor, Jovellanos, fell in disgrace before Godoy, he was ordered to be exiled to Medina del Campo, later to Zamora and finally to Salamanca. He was pro-French during the War of Independence and avoided being shot in Oviedo, but had no choice but to go into exile after the defeat of the French army.

Two stages can be distinguished in the lyric poetry of Meléndez Valdés:

- In the first he is attracted in his youth by the predominant Rococó poetry and by the influence of José Cadalso. He composed anacreontic and pastoral poems with love as the predominant theme. From this first stage it is worth mentioning the eclogue Batilo.
- However, after the death of Cadalso, and following Jovellanos' advice, he thought that pastoral poetry was inappropriate for a magistrate, so he composed another type of poetry more in keeping with his profession. Like Jovellanos, he was sensitive to social inequalities, defended the need to undertake reforms to improve the life of the people, criticized courtly customs, and his poetry became philosophical, sentimental and reflective.

His style, in its beginnings, was contrived and conventional, but later became very conventional and precise. He himself defined his purpose when he wrote: "I have taken care to explain myself with nobility and to use a language worthy of the great matters I have dealt with".

=== The Sevillian school ===
Like Salamanca, the city of Seville also had a great poetic tradition. In 1751 the Academia de las Buenas Letras was founded, which promoted literary activity. From 1760, and as a result of the arrival of Pablo de Olavide as intendant of the Government of Andalusia, culture in that city was noticeably boosted. In 1776, Olavide was persecuted and jailed by the Inquisition.

Under the influence of José Cadalso and Meléndez, poems were written that were more ornate and colorful than those of the Salmantine school, also influenced by Fernando de Herrera. In the Sevillian school, poets like Manuel María de Arjona (1771–1820), José Marchena (1768–1820), Joseph Blanco White (1775–1841) and Alberto Lista (1775–1848) stood out. They wrote patriotic poems urging people to fight for freedom after the invasion of the French and the return of Ferdinand VII in the early 19th century. Some of them went into exile.

=== The Madrilenian school: the fabulists Iriarte and Samaniego ===
In the Court and bourgeois circles, the reformist ideas of the 18th century took hold quickly. In addition to the Academies, there were also other private initiatives that had a great influence on literature, such as the Fonda de San Sebastián, founded by Nicolás Fernández de Moratín and his son Leandro, together with Cadalso and Jovellanos.

Two writers were also members of the Madrilenian group. With the purpose of correcting defects and showing rational values, they wrote fables. They were Tomás de Iriarte (La Orotava, Tenerife, 1750–Madrid, 1791) and Félix María Samaniego: (La Guardia, Álava, 1745–1801).

== Theater ==
In theater, the main cultivators were those of the Madrilenian group. They submitted to the teachings of classic and modern preceptors, and created a theater which followed the political and moral interests of the time. Three trends existed:

- The traditional trend. During the first half of the 18th century, theater was in decline.
- The neoclassical trend.
- The popular trend. The sainetes enjoyed popular support. They were written in verse, related to the pasos and entremeses of previous centuries. The most important author of sainetes was Ramón de la Cruz.

Theater adopted the new fashions coming from France. In neoclassical theater, reason and harmony were also imposed as the norm. The so-called "rule of three units" was obeyed, which demanded a single action, a single stage and a coherent chronological time in the development of the dramatic action. The separation of the comic and the tragic was established. Imaginative restraint was imposed, eliminating everything that was considered exaggerated or in "bad taste". An educational and moralizing purpose was adopted, which served to spread the universal values of culture and progress.

Although less rationalist than other genres, tragedy cultivated historical themes, as is the case of the best known, Raquel, by Vicente García de la Huerta. But undoubtedly the most representative theater of the time was that of Leandro Fernández de Moratín, creator of what has come to be called Moratinian comedy. As opposed to the tragic genre, the most common at the time, which was practiced by his father Nicolás, and as opposed to Ramón de la Cruz's amiable sainete regarding local customs, Leandro Fernández de Moratín ridiculed the vices and the customs of his time, in a clear attempt to turn the theater into a vehicle for moralizing customs.

=== Leandro Fernandez de Moratín ===
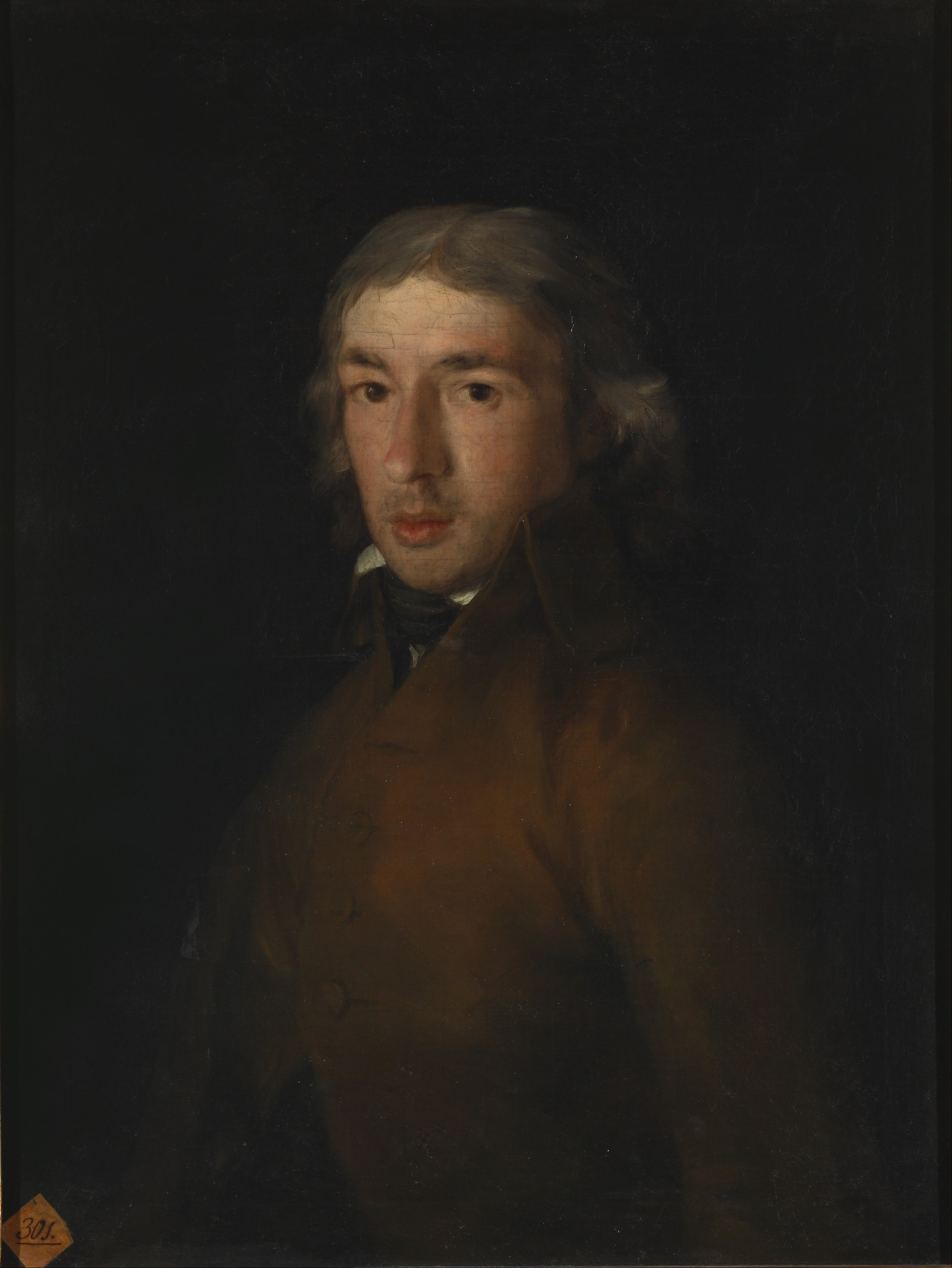
Leandro Fernández de Moratín (1799), by Goya, Real Academia de Bellas Artes de San Fernando

Son of Nicolás Fernández de Moratín, Leandro (Madrid, 1760–Paris, 1828) is the main 18th-century playwright. He owes his neoclassical orientation to his father. A protégé of Jovellanos and Godoy, he traveled through England, France (he witnessed the outbreak of the French Revolution) and Italy. He fell in love with Paquita Muñoz, much younger than him, whom he never married because of his desire to not enter into commitments. He was pro-French and accepted from José Bonaparte the position of chief librarian, for which he was banished to France, where he died after the defeat of the invaders.

As poet, he wrote satirical poems like the Sátira contra los vicios introducidos en la poesía castellana, a theme that he returns to in prose in La derrota de los pedantes. Current critics consider Moratín to be the most outstanding lyricist of the 18th century. In the poem Elegía a las musas, in his old age, he bids farewell to poetry and theater, which had been his reason for living.

As a playwright, he wrote only five comedies that earned him a great reputation among the enlightened people. In El viejo y la niña and El sí de las niñas (1806), he defends the woman's right to accept her spouse or not against the imposition of her family, since it was common to marry young girls to wealthy old men. In La mojigata, he criticizes hypocrisy and false piety. Another comedy is El barón, and finally La comedia nueva or El café (1792) is a mockery of authors who ignore the Aristotelian rules.

=== Ramón de la Cruz ===
Th sainete writer Ramón de la Cruz (Madrid, 1731–1794) was one of the authors most applauded by the public and most criticized by the neoclassicals (although some of them, seeing the popular support of his works, retracted their views). He began writing tragedies of neoclassical style, rejecting the "messy" theater that people preferred. Nevertheless, his economic needs made him approach less-enlightened genres more acclaimed by the public and the actors. In this way, he began to write zarzuelas with Spanish themes and, at the same time, sainetes. Of the latter he wrote more than four hundred, generally in octosyllabic verse, and some in hendecasyllabic. The characters of this theater subgenre are popular (manolas, majos, mocked husbands, bricklayers, chestnut sellers, ruined noblemen, etc.) and the action usually takes place in Madrid: La pradera de San Isidro, El Prado por la tarde, El Rastro por la mañana; the ending is sometimes intended to be exemplary. The most famous of his sainetes is Manolo, a satire of the theater written by his neoclassical enemies. With his maxim "I write and the truth dictates to me", he could find in the people an inexhaustible source, the same one that, with greater depth, would inspire Francisco de Goya.

== Pre-Romanticism ==
Some works of the Salmantine school foreshadow the beginning of Romanticism. Thus, in José Cadalso's Las noches lúgubres, madness, gloomy and nocturnal atmospheres and a great amorous passion are introduced. Other important authors are Nicasio Álvarez de Cienfuegos (1764–1809), Manuel José Quintana (1772–1857), Juan Nicasio Gallego (1777–1853) and José Somoza (1781–1852).

== See also ==
- Literature of Spain: Evolution of Spanish literature.
- Enlightenment Spain: Historical context of the Enlightenment in Spain.
- Age of Enlightenment: General vision of the movement.

== Bibliography ==
- Historia de la literatura española. III. Siglo XVIII, J.L. Alborg, Gredos, Madrid, 1972. ISBN 9788424931247
- La novela del siglo XVIII, J. Álvarez Barrientos, Júcar, Madrid, 1991. ISBN 9788433484024
- Antología de la Literatura Española. Siglo XVIII, A. Amorós, Castalia, Madrid, 1999. ISBN 84-7039-804-0
- La poesía del siglo ilustrado, J. Arce, Alhambra, Madrid, 1980. ISBN 9788420507378
- Historia social de la literatura española, II, VVAA., Castalia, Madrid, 1978. ISBN 9788470392986
- La comedia sentimental, género español del siglo XVIII, Universidad de Extremadura, Cáceres, 1994. ISBN 9788477231776
- La cara oscura de la Ilustración, G. Carnero, Fundación Juan March-Cátedra, 1983. ISBN 978-8437604091
- Los conceptos de Rococó, Neoclasicismo y Prerromanticismo en la literatura española del siglo XVIII, J. Caso González, Universidad de Oviedo, 1970. OCLC 606185939
- La España de la Ilustración, Mª R. Pérez Estévez, Actas, Madrid, 2002. ISBN 978-8497390118
- Manual de literatura española V. Siglo XVIII, F. Pedraza y M. Rodríguez, Tafalla, Cenlit, 1983. ISBN 9788485511099
- La prosa del siglo XVIII, F. Sánchez Blanco, Júcar, Madrid, 1992. ISBN 9788433484048
- El ensayo español. El siglo XVIII. Vol. 2, F. Sánchez Blanco, Crítica, Barcelona, 1997. ISBN 9788474237610
