= Juan Meléndez Valdés =

Spanish poet (1754–1817)

The Most Excellent Juan Meléndez
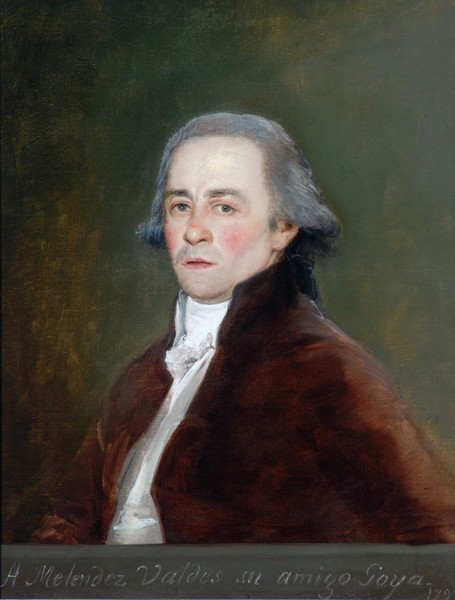
- Portrait by Francisco de Goya. circa 1797
- Born: Juan Meléndez Valdés; 11 March 1754; Ribera del Fresno, Spain
- Died: 24 May 1817 (aged 63); Montpellier, France

Seat B of the Real Academia Española
- In office 16 July 1812 – 24 May 1817
- Preceded by: Joaquín Juan Flores
- Succeeded by: Agustín de Silva y Palafox

Juan Meléndez Valdés (11 March 1754 – 24 May 1817) was a Spanish neoclassical poet.

== Biography ==
He was born at Ribera del Fresno, in what is now the province of Badajoz. Destined by his parents for the priesthood, he graduated in law at Salamanca, where he became indoctrinated with the ideas of the French philosophical school. In 1780 with Batilo, a pastoral in the manner of Garcilaso de la Vega, he won a prize offered by the Spanish academy; next year he was introduced to Jovellanos, through whose influence he was appointed to a professorship at Salamanca in 1783.

The pastoral scenes in Las Bodas de Camacho (1784) do not compensate for its undramatic nature, but it gained a prize from the municipality of Madrid. A volume of verses, lyrical and pastoral, published in 1785, caused Meléndez Valdés to be hailed as the first Spanish poet of his time. This success induced him to resign his chair at Salamanca, and try his fortune in politics. Once more, the friendship of Jovellanos obtained for him in 1789 a judgeship at Zaragoza, whence he was transferred two years later to a post in the chancery court at Valladolid. In 1797 he dedicated to Godoy an enlarged edition of his poems, the new matter consisting principally of unsuccessful imitations of John Milton and Thomson; but the poet was rewarded by promotion to a high post in the treasury at Madrid.

On the fall of Jovellanos in 1798 Meléndez Valdés was dismissed and exiled from the capital; he returned in 1808 and accepted office as a Minister of Public Instruction in 1811, under Joseph Bonaparte. He had previously denounced the French usurper in his verses. He now outraged the feelings of his countrymen by the grossest flattery of his foreign master, and in 1813 he fled to Alais. It was around 1812 that he was promoted to a member of the Royal Spanish Academy, too. Four years later he died in poverty at Montpellier. His remains were removed to Spain in 1866 and finally to Madrid, "Panteón de Hombres Ilustres", in 1900.

Many of his successors, including Manuel José Quintana, recognized him as the outstanding poet of eighteenth-century Spain, and he continues to be judged so today. He was a close friend of the artist Francisco de Goya.
