= Messager =

Messager is a surname. Notable people with the surname include:

- André Messager (1853–1929), French composer and musician
- Annette Messager (born 1943), French artist known for her installation art
