= Draganović =

Draganović is a South Slavic language patronymic surname derived from the first name Dragan. Notable people with the surname include:

- Julia Draganović (born 1963), German curator and cultural manager
- Krunoslav Draganović (1903–1983), Croatian Roman Catholic priest, historian and Nazi collaborator
