= Julia Draganović =

German curator and cultural manager

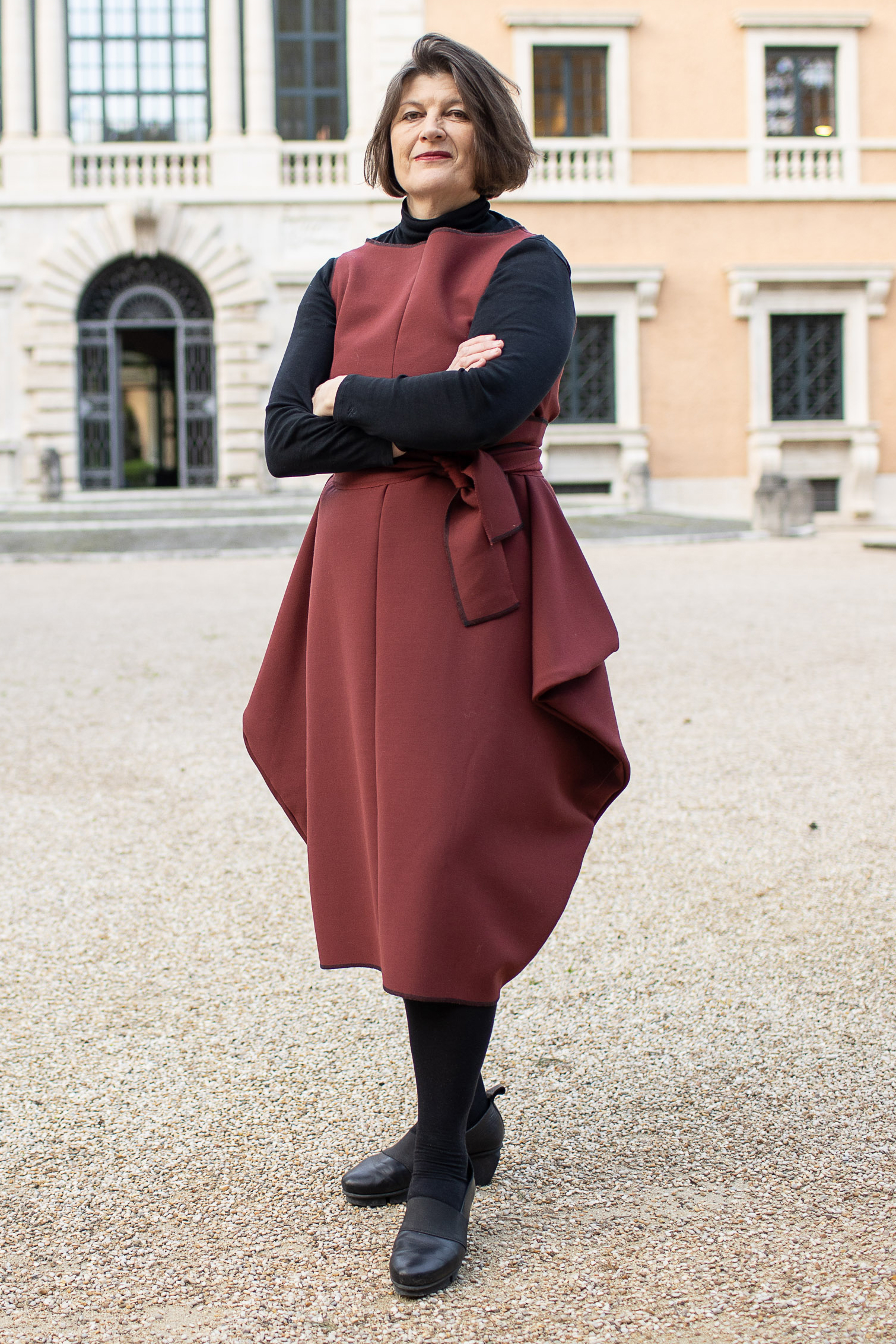
Julia Draganović in front of Villa Massimo (2020)

Julia Draganović (born in 1963 in Hamburg, West Germany) is a German curator and cultural manager. German-Italian cultural relations have been a recurring theme in her work. In July 2019 she became director of the German Academy in Rome Villa Massimo (Deutsche Akademie Rom Villa Massimo).

== University education ==
Draganović studied art history, German studies, philosophy and Romance studies (Italian studies) at the Westphalian Wilhelms University of Münster in Germany. In 1995, she received her doctorate there, writing her dissertation on Ernst Jünger, titled Figürliche Schrift: Zur darstellerischen Umsetzung von Weltanschauung in Jüngers erzählerischem Werk (Figural Writing: on the Representational Realisation of World View in Ernst Jünger’s Narrative Work).

== Curator and cultural manager ==
In 1999 Draganović founded „Kulturbüro LaRete" in Weimar as an association of freelance cultural managers. Each year from 1999 to 2003 she curated a double exhibition in nearby Schloss Ettersburg. In Weimar she was president and board member of the German-Italian Society Thuringia (DIGIT e.V.). As head of division for European affairs at the Thuringian Ministry of Justice and European Affairs, she was responsible for the presentation of Weimar as the European Capital of Culture 1999 in Brussels. For the Bauhaus-University Weimar she conceptualised and organised the cultural events of the European Summer Academy. From 2000 to 2002, she also managed the Klezmer Wochen Weimar (Weimar Klezmer Weeks), a Jewish cultural festival which is now known as Yiddish Summer Weimar.

From 1999 to 2003 she was also head of the international artists in residence program at ACC Galerie Weimar. From 2005 to 2006 Draganović was artistic director of the Chelsea Art Museum in New York City. From 2009 to 2014 she curated the Art Miami.

In 2004 Draganović and curator Claudia Löffelholz founded the curators-collective in Modena, which is meant as a cultural network and follow-up project of the joint cultural office in Weimar, „LaRete Art Projects". From 2009 to 2013 Draganović developed and curated the International Award for Participatory Art in Bologna. From 2007 to 2009 she was artistic director of PAN Palazzo delle Arti di Napoli in Italy. In the years 2010 through to 2012 Draganović acted as curator of the „Art First“-projects in the public urban space for the art fair Arte Fiera in Bologna.

From 2009 to 2015 she was a member of the scientific committee of Mudam (Musée d’Art Moderne du Grand-Duc Jean) in Luxembourg. Since 2009 Draganović is a board member of the New York based non-profit organisation „No Longer Empty", and since 2014 she is also president of the IKT International Association of Curators of Contemporary Art, which was founded in 1973 with the participation of Harald Szeemann.

From 2013 to 2019 Draganović acted as director of the contemporary art center Kunsthalle Osnabrück (art hall Osnabrück), putting her focus on performances. She ended the commitment to become director of Villa Massimo. Draganović aims to establish Villa Massimo as a role model for open temporary communities in which nationality is irrelevant. Artists, who do not own a German passport but live in Germany and have gained recognition in their field of art, can apply for a residency in Villa Massimo, called Rome Prize.

== Curated exhibitions (selection) ==
- Hautnah. Europäisches Atelierprogramm (Up close. European Atelier Programme) 1999 (ACC Galerie Weimar)
- Herzblut – Schriftbild. 6. Europäisches Atelierprogramm (Life Blood – Type Face. 6th European Atelier Programme) 2001 (ACC Galerie Weimar)
- Das Maß der Dinge. 7. Europäisches Atelierprogramm (The Measure of Things. 7th European Atelier Programme) 2002 (ACC Galerie Weimar)
- Übermenschen. 8. Europäisches Atelierprogramm (Superhumans. 8th European Atelier Programme) 2002 (ACC Galerie Weimar)
- Herkunft Niemandsland. 9. Europäisches Atelierprogramm (Origin No Man's Land. 9th European Atelier Programme) 2003 (ACC Galerie Weimar)
- Courtney Smith. Tongue and Groove. Curated together with Manon Slome. 2006 (Chelsea Art Museum)
- Click or Clash? Strategien der Zusammenarbeit (Strategies of Collaboration). Exhibition series, since 2012
- Michael Beutler, Architekt – Etienne Descloux, Künstler (Michael Beutler, Architect – Etienne Descloux, Artist). (Kunsthalle Osnabrück, 2014–2015)
- Maria José Arjona, Niklas Goldbach, Vlatka Horvat et al..: Was für ein Fest? (What a Party?) (Kunsthalle Osnabrück, 2015)
- Pedro Cabrita Reis, Marie Cool, Fabio Balducci, José Dávila et al.: Konkret mehr Raum. Ausstellung (Concretely More Space. Exhibition) (Kunsthalle Osnabrück, 2015)
- Jan Tichy: Installation Nr. 29 (Kunsthalle Osnabrück/Neues Rathaus (New town hall), 2017)
- Felice Varini (Kunsthalle Osnabrück, 2018)
- Andrea Mastrovito: Symphonie eines Jahrhunderts (Kunsthalle Osnabrück, 2018)
- Katharina Hohmann: Inventur (Inventory). (Kunsthalle Osnabrück, 2019)

== Publications (selection) ==
- Andrea Dittrich and Julia Draganović: Über Menschen. Zur Zukunft des Humanen (About People. On the Future of the Human Quality). 2 vols., Glaux Verlag Christine Jäger KG, Jena 2003, ISBN 978-3-93174-361-1
- Julia Draganović and Antonella Tricoli (eds.): Fai da te. Die Welt des Künstlers, 8 Varianten (Fai da te. The Artist's World, 8 Variants). Nuovagrafica, Carpi 2006
- Julia Draganović: Eroi! Come noi? (Heroes! Like Us?) Electa, Naples 2007, ISBN 978-8-85100-417-0
- Julia Draganović and Tseng Fangling (eds.): Tracce nel Futuro/Footprints into the future. Texts by Julia Draganović, Tseng Fangling and Nicola Oddati. Electa, Naples 2007
- Julia Draganović: L’Impresa dell’arte/The Enterprise of Art. Electa, Naples 2008, ISBN 88-510-0530-3
- Andrea Dietrich, Julia Draganović and Claudia Löffelholz (eds.): La Bauhaus si muove!/The Bauhaus Moves! Texts by Andrea Dietrich and Julia Draganović, Nuovagrafica, Carpi 2008
- Julia Draganović, Claudia Löffelholz (eds.): Viaggio Leggero. Niente da perdere/Traveling light. Nothing to lose. Nuovagrafica, Carpi 2008
- Wulf Herzogenrath, Julia Draganović: Yves Netzhammer. Hatje Cantz, Berlin 2009, ISBN 978-3-77572-318-3
- Stefano Cagol, Julia Draganović: Undergo Alarms. Studio d’Arte Raffaelli, Trento 2010, ISBN 978-8-89028-795-4
- Julia Draganović: Andrea Mastrovito. Easy Come, Easy Go. Silvana Editoriale, Milan 2011, ISBN 9788836620333
- Julia Draganović et al.: The Eye of the Collector. Video Works from the Collection Manuel de Santaren. Palladino Editore, Campobasso 2012
- Julia Draganović, Anna Szynwelska (eds.): This Troublesome, Uncomfortable and Questionable Relevance of Art in Public Space. With contributions by Chantal Mouffe, Mika Hannula, Jadwiga Charzyńska, Julia Draganović and others. Laznia Centre for Contemporary Art, Gdańsk 2013, ISBN 978-83-61646-56-3
- Kunsthaus Centre d’art Pasquart Biel/Bienne (ed.), Julia Draganović, Claudia Löffelholz (eds. and authors): IRWIN. How to Read a Map. Verlag für moderne Kunst, Vienna 2017, ISBN 978-3-90322-800-9
- Sabine Maria Schmidt, Julia Draganović, Christoph Faulhaber (eds.), Inke Arns, Julia Draganović, Christoph Faulhaber et al.: Christoph Faulhaber: A Golden Age. Hatje Cantz, Berlin 2019, ISBN 978-3-77574-512-3
