= Tomás de Iriarte =

18th-century Spanish writer and fabulist

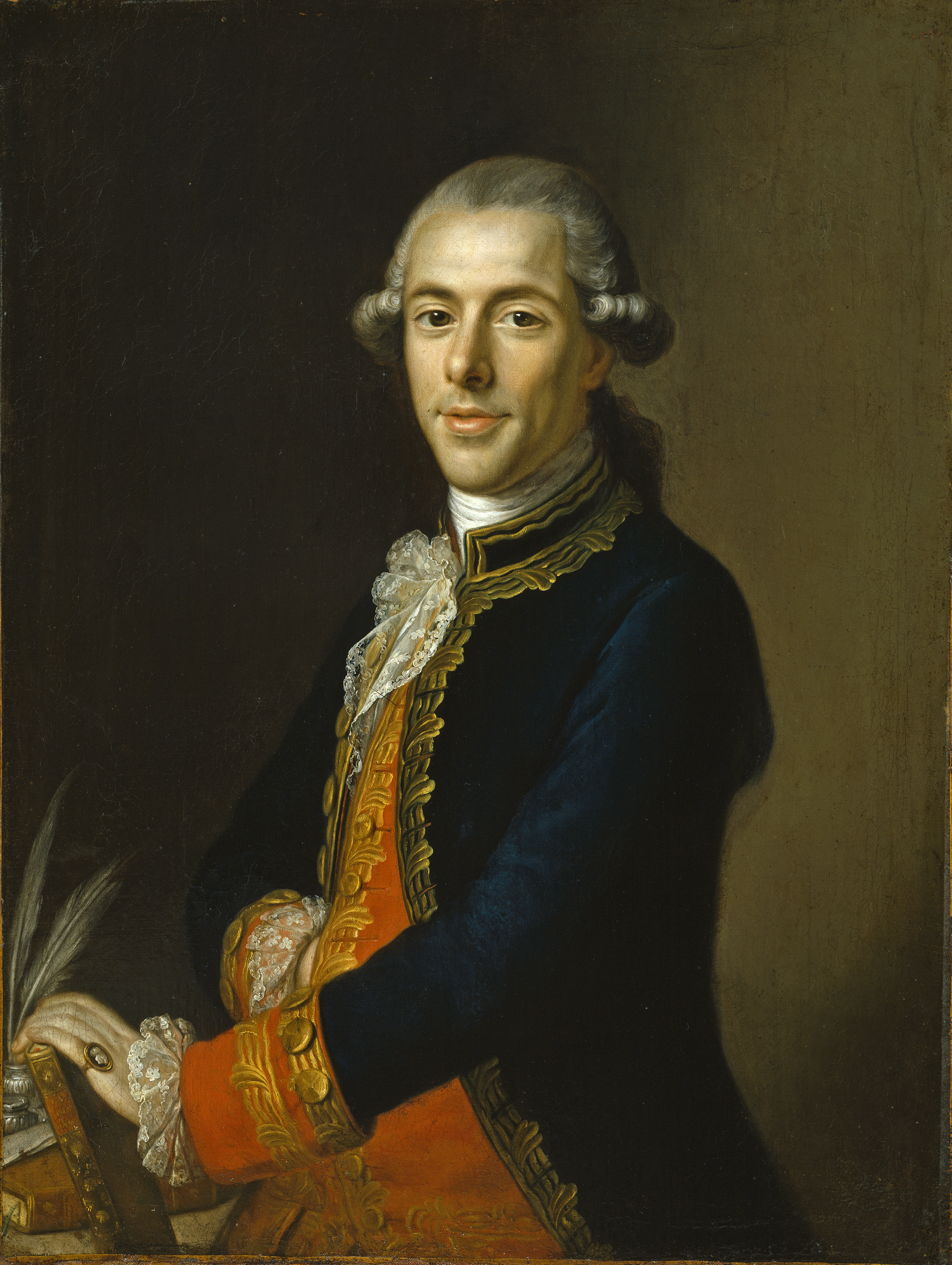
- Born: 18 September 1750
- Died: 17 September 1791; Madrid
- Occupation: Writer

Tomás de Iriarte (or Yriarte) (18 September 1750 in Puerto de la Cruz, Tenerife – 17 September 1791 in Madrid) was a Spanish neoclassical poet.

== Life ==
Tomás was born to the Iriarte family, many of whose members were writers in the humanist tradition. His father was Don Bernardo de Iriarte, while his mother was Doña Bárbara de las Nieves Hernández de Oropesa; therefore his full name is variously given as Tomás de Iriarte y Nieves Ravelo or Tomás de Iriarte y Oropesa. His brothers were Domingo and Bernardo de Iriarte.

He received his literary education at Madrid where he went aged 14, in 1764, under the care of his uncle, Juan de Iriarte (Puerto de la Cruz, 1701 – Madrid 1771), librarian to the king of Spain. At 18 Tomás began his literary career by translating French plays for the royal theatre, and in 1770, under the anagram of Tirso Imarete, he published an original comedy entitled Hacer que hacemos. In the following year he became official translator at the foreign office, and in 1776 keeper of the records in the war department. In 1780 he authored a didactic poem in silvas entitled La Música, which attracted attention in Italy as well as at home.

The Fábulas literarias (1782), with which his name is most intimately associated, are composed in a variety of metres, and was known for humorous attacks on literary men and methods, as was the case repeatedly, with Juan Bautista Pablo Forner (1756–97).

During his later years, partly as a consequence of the Fábulas, Iriarte was entangled in personal controversies, and in 1786 was reported to the Spanish Inquisition for his sympathies with French philosophers. He died of gout at Madrid, 17 September 1791, aged only 41.

He is the subject of an 1897 monograph by Emilio Cotarelo (1857–1936), a member of the Royal Spanish Academy.

== See also ==
- Fable
- Spanish Enlightenment literature
