= Annette Messager =

French artist

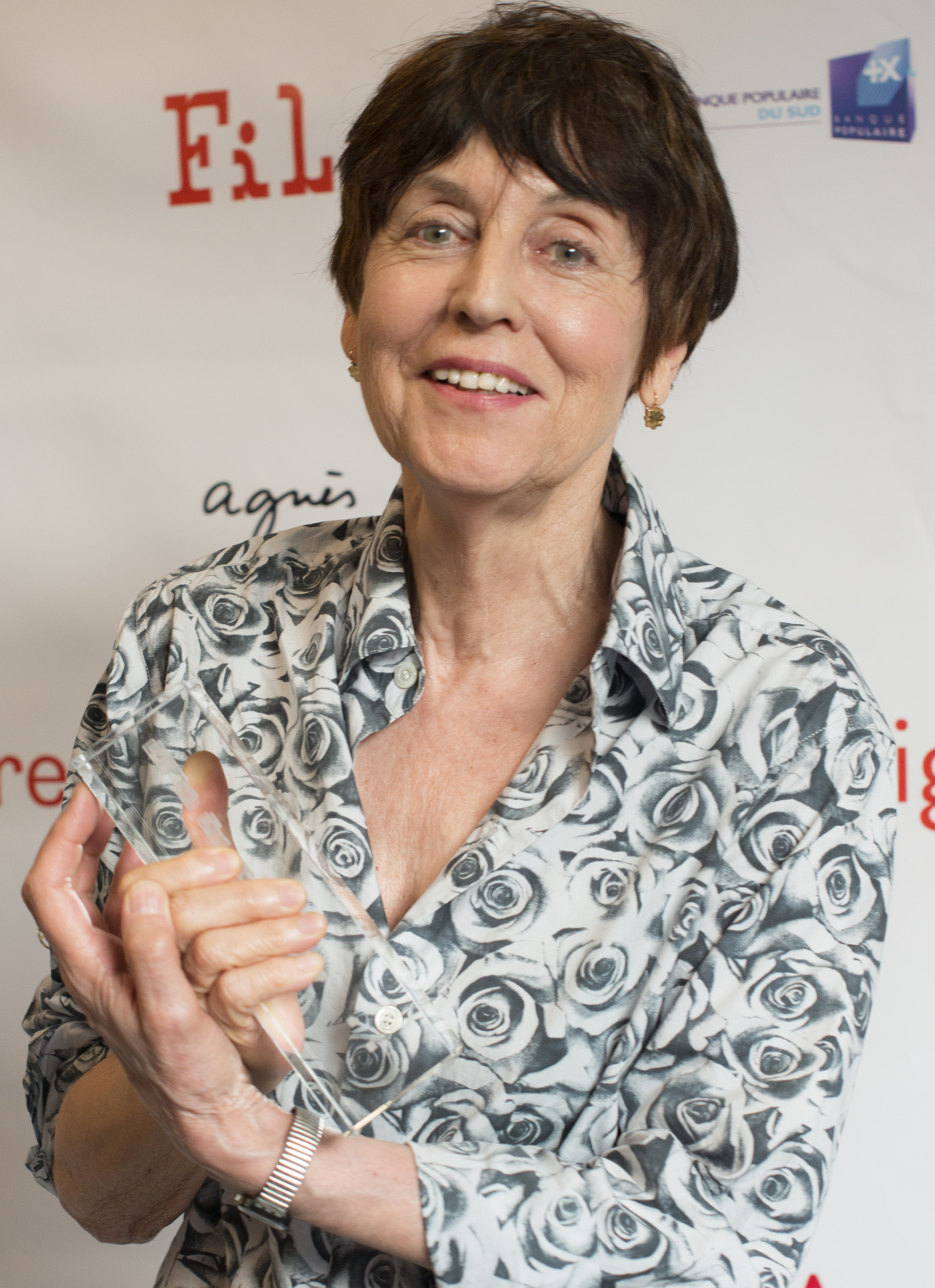
- Messager in 2017
- Born: 30 November 1943 (age 82); Berck, France
- Education: École nationale supérieure des arts décoratifs
- Known for: Visual art

Annette Messager (born 30 November 1943) is a French visual artist. She is known for championing the techniques and materials of outsider art. In 2005, she won the Golden Lion Award at the Venice Biennale for her artwork at the French Pavilion. In 2016, she won the prestigious Praemium Imperiale International Arts Award. She lives and works in Malakoff, just outside Paris.

== Biography ==
Annette Messager was born on 30 November 1943 in Berck-sur-Mer, France. Her father was a photographer and amateur painter. Between 1962 and 1966, Messager attended the École des Arts Décoratifs in Paris, France. Her mother entered one of her daughter Annette's photographs in a Kodak competition. It won an art trip around the world. Messager and the late artist Christian Boltanski were partners.

== Career ==
Messager is known mainly for her installation work which often incorporates photographs, prints and drawings, and various materials. Her work rejects traditional methods in visual arts such as painting in favour of bricolage works that combine media and subvert value systems, often making experimental use of methods traditionally designated to a "so-called feminine sensibility." "I found my voice as an artist when I stepped on a dead sparrow on a street in Paris in 1971. I didn't know why, but I was sure this sparrow was important because it was something very fragile that was near me and my life," states Messager. The sparrow was soon joined by others and became the sculptured taxidermy exhibit of The Boarders, ("Les Pensionnaires") which launched her career in 1972.

Detail of Mes Petites Effigies (1989–1990) at the Phillips Collection in Washington, DC

She has exhibited and published her work extensively.

In 2005, she represented France at the Venice Biennale, where she won the Golden Lion for her Pinocchio-inspired installation that transformed the French pavilion into a casino. Created in 2019 and located in Lille, Dessous-dessous ("Upside Down") is a modified version of the piece. It is made up of a crimson silk cloth that reveals glimpses of items that seem remnants of a shipwreck, along with semblances of body parts. This work references migrants' fatal voyages across the Mediterranean sea.

'The red fabric is blood and the Mediterranean is full of corpses,'

One of her most famous pieces is her exhibition The Messengers, which showcases an installation of rooms that include a series of photographs and toy-like, hand knit animals in costumes. For example, some of the animals' heads were replaced by heads of other stuffed animals to reflect the ways in which humans disguise themselves or transform their identities with costume.

In 2014, she created an installation titled Les Interdictions: a combination of the puppet motif and a pattern of sixty eight prohibitory signs from around the world. The only sign that was invented by the artist is a sign condemning prostitution.

In 2023, one of her works, Mes voeux (avec nos cheveux), was used as the promotional artwork for the Peter Gabriel song "Playing For Time".

== Inspirations ==
"Because I was born in France during World War II, I was exposed to death at an early age..." Death and the ephemeral nature of living are major sources of inspiration for Messager's works.

While not calling herself a feminist (she says that in France the term means something different than it does elsewhere), Messager has given herself many different titles over the years, portraying herself as Annette Messager the Artist, the Collector, the Trickster, the Peddler, the Cheater, and the Practical Woman. She has used many different, marginalised techniques such as knitting, taxidermy, photography, labels, and toys, and has created soft sculptures and installations. Her art explores how through their small actions, secrets and private rituals, women are still able to be themselves in a world of male privilege.

=== Select solo exhibitions ===
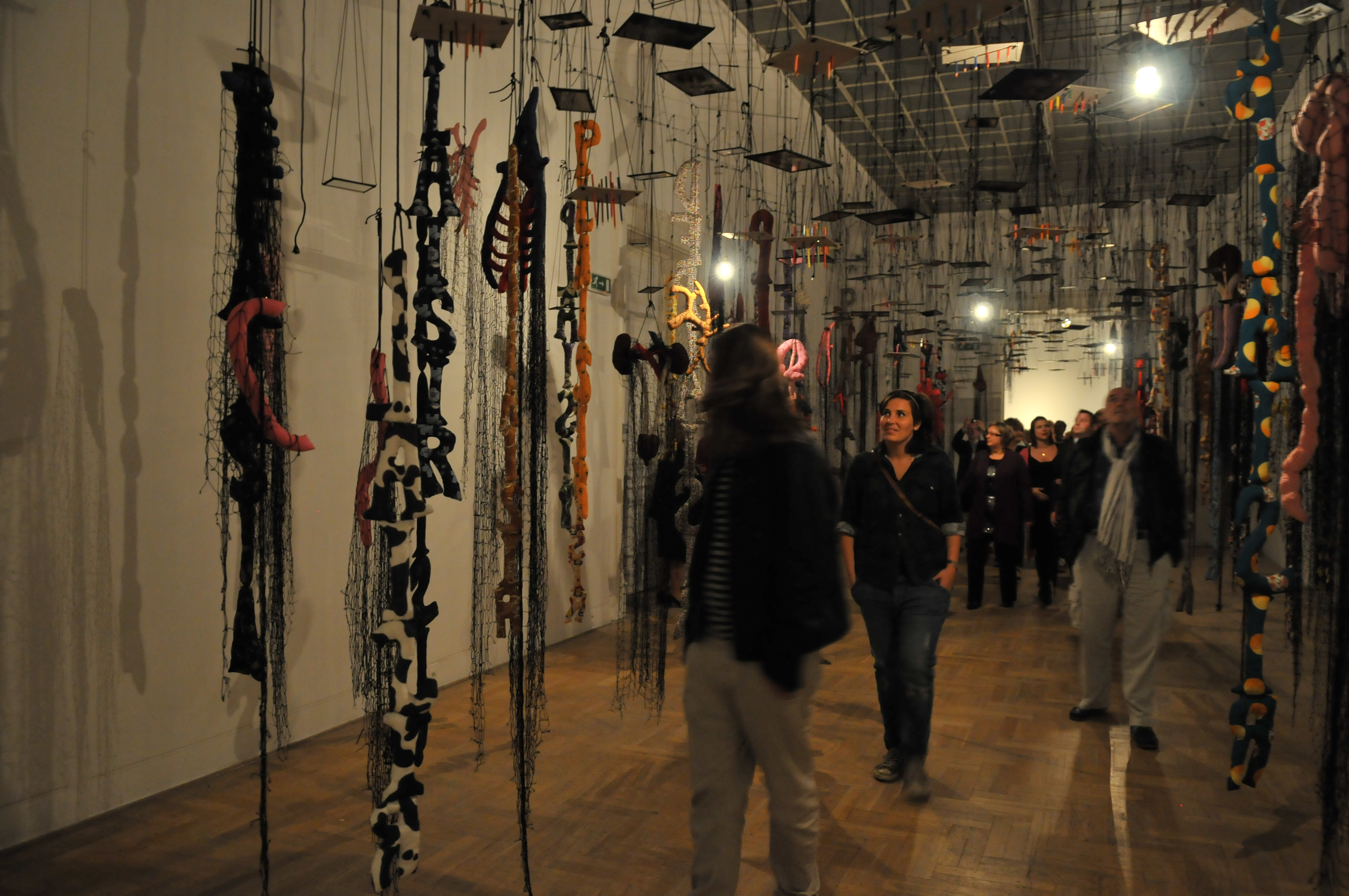
Exhibition view of Annette Messager's installation Faire Parade at Zachęta Gallery, Warsaw 2010

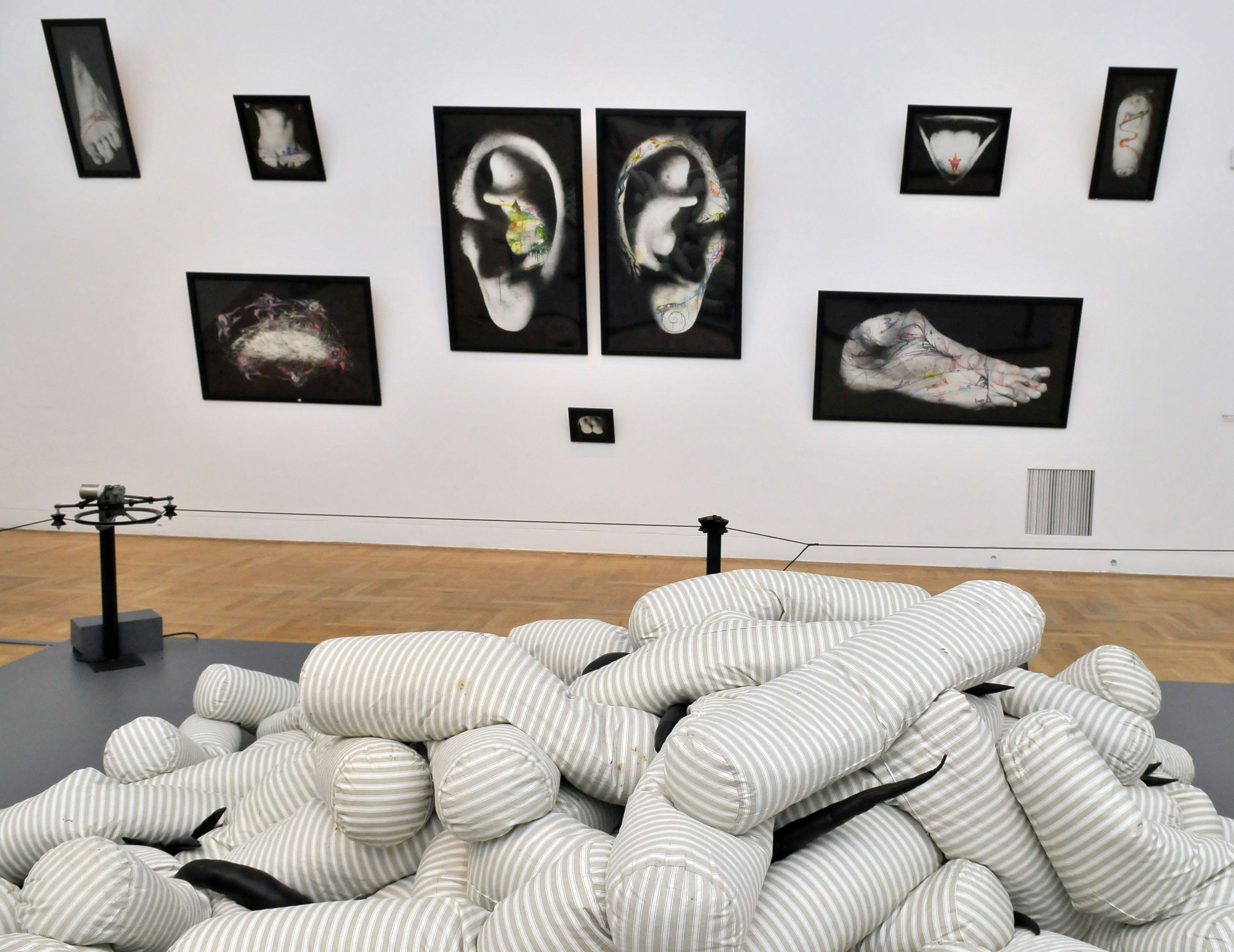
Annette Messager's Faire Parade exhibition at Zachęta Gallery, 2010

- Musée de Peinture et de Sculpture, Grenoble: 1973, 1989–90 (touring retrospective)
- Musée d'Art Moderne de la Ville de Paris: 1974, 1984, 1995
- Rheinisches Landesmuseum, Bonn: 1976, 1978
- Galerie Isy Brachot, Brussels, 1977
- Holly Solomon Gallery, New York: 1978
- Galerie Gillespie-Laage Salomon, Paris: 1979, 1985
- St. Louis Art Museum: 1980
- Fine Arts Gallery, University of California, Berkeley: 1981
- St. Francisco Museum of Modern Art, 1981
- PS 1, Long Island City, NY: 1981
- Artists' Space, New York: 1981

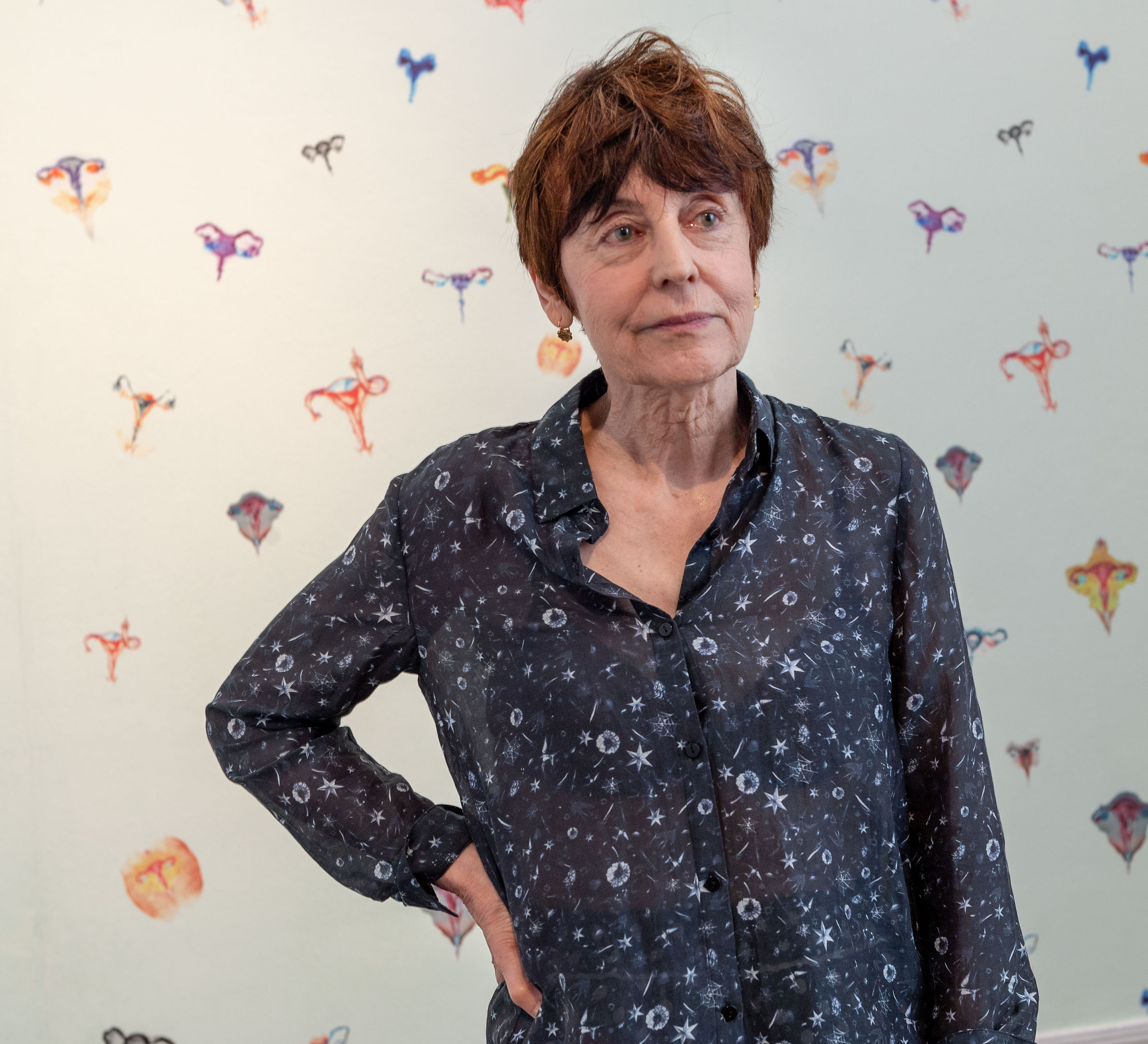
Annette Messager in 2018, during the presentation of her exhibition in the IVAM.

- Musée de Beaux-Arts, Calais, 1983
- Musée d'Art Moderne de la Ville de Paris, 1984
- Gallerie d'Art contemporaine, Nice, 1986.
- Musee de Grenoble, 1989.
- Musee Departmentale, Chateau de Rochechouart, 1990.
- Douglas Hyde Gallery, Dublin, 1992.
- Arnolfini, Bristol, 1992.
- FRAC Picardie, 1993.
- Penetration, Museum of Modern Art, New York, 1995.
- Los Angeles County Museum of Art, 1995.
- The Messengers, Centre Georges Pompidou, Paris, 2007.
- Mori Art Museum, Tokyo 2008.
- The Messenger, Hayward Gallery, London 2009.
- Museo de Arte Contemporaneo (MARCO), Monterrey 2010.
- Zachęta National Gallery, Warsaw 2010.
- Antiguo Colegio de San Ildefonso, Mexico City 2011
- Galerie mfc-michèle didier, Paris, 2011. "Mes dessins secrets, Mon guide du tricot, Ma collection de champignons bons et de champignons mortels"
- Galerie mfc-michèle didier, Paris, November 2012 – January 2013. "Ma collection de proverbes"
- Púdico-público, IVAM, València, 2018.
- Tragikomedie, Kunsthalle Praha, 8 October 2026 – 28 February 2027.

=== Select group exhibitions ===
- Couples. MoMA PS1, New York, 1978.
- Photography as Art. Institute of Contemporary Arts, London, 1979.
- Today's Art and Erotism. Kunstverein, Bonn, 1982.
- Images in Transition. National Museum of Modern Art, Kyoto. 1990.
- Parallel Visions. Los Angeles County Museum of Art, Los Angeles, 1992.
- A visage decouvert. Fondation Cartier pour l'Art Contemporain, Paris, 1992.
- Arrested Childhood. Center of Contemporary Art, North Miami, 1994.
- New Works for a New Space. ArtPace, San Antonio, Texas, 1995.
- elles@centrepompidou. Centre Georges Pompidou, Paris 2010.
- Dead Animals and the Curious Occurrence of Taxidermy in Contemporary Art. Brown University Bell Gallery, Providence, Rhode Island 2016.
- Dream On. NEON at the former Public Tobacco Factory, Athens, Greece 2022.

=== Select books ===
- Mes dessins secrets, Bruxelles, mfc-michèle didier, 2011. Edition of 24 numbered and signed copies and 6 artist's proofs. Voir mfc-michèle didier
- Ma collection de champignons bons et de champignons mortels, Bruxelles, mfc-michèle didier, 2011. Edition of 24 numbered and signed copies and 6 artist's proofs.
- Mon guide du tricot, Bruxelles, mfc-michèle didier, 2011. Edition of 24 numbered and signed copies and 6 artist's proofs.

In 2006, a book under the title Word for Word: Texts, Writings and Interviews (1971–2005) was published. It explores the writing in Annette Messager's artworks, and gathers numerous related texts published in magazines or catalogues, as well as unpublished notes on Messager's work and her personal reflections on art and life. All her interviews from 1974 to the present are also included.

=== Select editions ===
- Ma collection de proverbes, Bruxelles, mfc-michèle didier, 2012. Edition of 24 numbered and signed copies and 6 artist's proofs. Voir mfc-michèle didier

== Sources ==
- Fabian Stech, J'ai parlé avec Lavier, Annette Messager, Sylvie Fleury, Hirschhorn, Pierre Huyghe, Delvoye, D.F.G. Hou Hanru, Sophie Calle, Minyg, Sans et Bourriaud. Presses du réel Dijon, 2007.
- Sheryl Conkelton and Carol Eliel, Annette Messager. Los Angeles County Museum of Art & The Museum of Modern Art, New York, 1995.
