= Václav Zenger =

Czech physicist, meteorologist and university educator

- Zenger drawn by Jan Vilímek
- Born: 17 December 1830; Chomutov, Bohemia, Austrian Empire
- Died: 22 January 1908 (aged 77); Prague, Bohemia, Austria-Hungary
- Resting place: Olšany Cemetery
- Occupations: physicist, meteorologist

Václav Karel Bedřich Zenger (German: Wenzel Karl Friedrich Zenger; 17 December 1830 – 22 January 1908) was a Czech physicist and meteorologist. He was a professor and rector of the Czech Technical University in Prague.

== Life ==
Zenger was born on 17 December 1830 in Chomutov in Bohemia. He was born into the family of a military physician. He attended secondary school in Hradec Králové, Prague and Čáslav, then the Cistercian grammar school in Německý Brod, the German grammar school in Malá Strana (1846) and the Piarist grammar school in Prague.

After studying philosophy for two years at Charles University in Prague, he enrolled at the Faculty of Law in 1848 to pursue a diplomatic career. In his fourth year of study, however, Zenger began attending lectures in mathematics and physics at the Faculty of Philosophy in addition to the law lectures. Over time, his interest in these lectures took over. He became a pupil and, in the last year and a half of his studies, a private and freelance assistant to the physicist František Adam Petřina (1799–1855). Zenger studied mainly mathematics with Wilhelm Matzek (1798–1891) and Josef Ladislav Jandera (1776–1957), astronomy with Karel Kreil and, after leaving for Vienna in 1851, with Joseph Georg Böhm (1807–1868).

In the summer semester of 1850/51 he attended Jan Evangelista Purkyně's lectures entitled “Cosmology”, which aroused in him a great interest in astronomical questions, so that he began to participate in the work at the Clementinum Observatory under Böhm's direction. In particular, he assisted with magnetic and meteorological observations. His interest in astronomy and meteorology accompanied him throughout his life.

Zenger completed his law studies in 1852 and his studies at the Faculty of Philosophy in 1853 with the authorisation to teach mathematics and physics at a grammar school with Czech and German as languages of instruction. From 1853 to 1861 he worked at the state Catholic grammar school in Banská Bystrica, and as he accepted a Hungarian scholarship during his studies, he was obliged to teach in what was then Hungary for at least six years after graduation. After completing his scholarship, in 1861 he asked the school authorities for a six-month leave of absence to carry out further scientific work at the Vienna Institute of Physics under its director Andreas von Ettingshausen, with the intention of habilitating at the Vienna Polytechnic (now the Vienna University of Technology). There, in February 1862, he received a decree transferring him to Prague, where at the end of the summer semester of 1862 he became the first private associate professor of physics at the State Polytechnic for teaching Czech and German. When the Polytechnic was finally divided into a Czech and a German one in 1869, he was transferred to the Czech Polytechnic (now the Czech Technical University) as professor of general and technical physics. He then worked there continuously until his retirement in December 1900. In the years from 1868 to 1896 he was elected dean seven times, and in the school year 1872/1873 he was the fourth rector.

From 1892 to 1896 he was the first president of the Czech Aeronautical Society. In 1898 he was appointed Hofrat and in 1907 received an honorary doctorate from the Technical University.

During his time at the Technical College, Zenger became convinced that electrical engineering would have a great influence on the development of industry in the future, and therefore advocated that its teaching should not only be a part of the physics education of mechanical engineers, but should become a subject in its own right. This was implemented from the school year 1883/84. His efforts in this direction continued and he succeeded in obtaining permission from the Viennese Ministry of Education to establish a separate chair of electrical engineering at the Czech Technical University from the school year 1891/92, which was headed by Karel Domalíp (1846–1909).

Zenger was a member of various scientific Czech and foreign institutions, including. Member of the Society of Czech Engineers, corresponding member of the Imperial and Royal Geological Survey in Vienna, member of the Royal Bohemian Society of Sciences, the Czech Academy of Sciences and Arts, the Association for the Promotion of Industry in Bohemia, honorary member of the Sociedad Científica Antonio Alzate in Mexico, the Società Astronomica Italiana in Rome, the Société nationale des Architectes de France in Paris, and honorary member of the International Solar Observatory of the Republic of Paraguay in Montevideo.

His students included, for example, František Křižík and Milan Rastislav Štefánik, who, on Zenger's advice, transferred from his studies in civil engineering to the Faculty of Philosophy.

Before his death, Zenger bequeathed his library, his astronomical instruments and his entire fortune to the university for the benefit of a student foundation. He died in January 1908 and was buried at the Olšany Cemetery.

== Scientific activities ==
His main interests were optics, astrophysics and the connections between solar and meteorological phenomena. Visitors to the General Land Centennial Exhibition in 1891 were able to see for themselves Zenger's versatility, where he presented 35 original instruments and 240 scientific publications. He was concerned with the methodology of electrolytic extraction of silver, copper and nickel.

He gained popularity for his theory of predicting great catastrophes. He published calendars in which he announced the dates of meteorological disturbances in advance. Thanks to his system of grounded lightning rods with symmetrically arranged arresters, the National Theatre in Prague was protected from lightning strikes. From the beginning, he also devoted himself to practical inventions.

Not all of his discoveries and inventions were confirmed and generally accepted. He published mainly in Czech, German and French (a total of 330 papers in 6 languages).

== Awards and honours ==
In 1908, Zenger was awarded the honorary title of Doctor of Technical Sciences by the Czech Technical University in Prague.

In honour of Zenger, the main lecture hall of the Czech Technical University on Charles Square in Prague was renamed the “Zenger Lecture Hall” (Zengerova posluchárna in Czech).

In Prague's public area of Klárov in the Malá Strana district, a transfer station was named after Zenger in his honour, the Zengerova transformační stanice (English: Zenger's transfer station). The building, constructed between 1929 and 1934, was designed by architect Vilém Kvasnička.

A substation built between 1930 and 1931 by the City of Prague Electricity Works below Prague Castle in the Malá Strana district of Prague was named in Zenger's honour, the Zenger Transformation Station (Czech: Zengerova transformační stanice). Since February 2022, the building has housed Kunsthalle Praha, a private museum of contemporary art.

== Written estate ==
The written estate of Zenger is now in the National Technical Museum in Prague. The museum received the estate in May 1933, and small additions were made to the collection in 1934 and 1940. The estate consists of Zenger's scientific and private correspondence; his patent, legal and commercial documents; photographs and notebooks.
