= Nicolás Fernández de Moratín =

Spanish writer and dramatist (1737–1780)

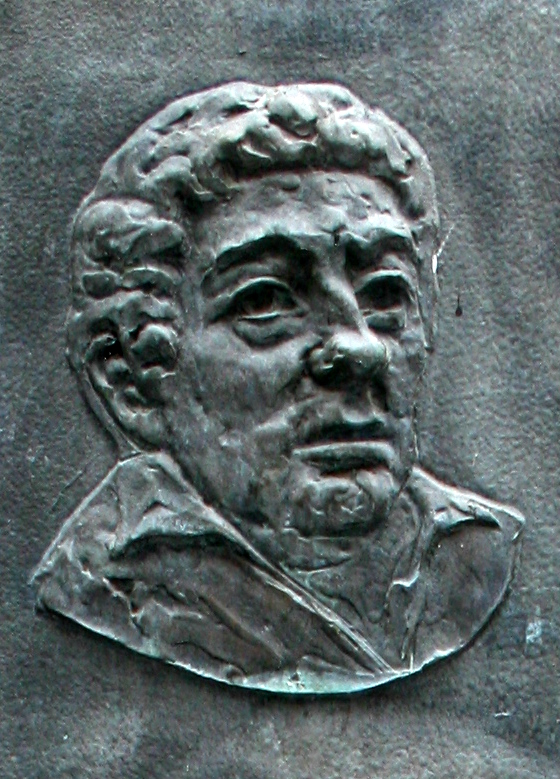
Nicolás Fernández de Moratín

Nicolás Fernández de Moratín (1737–1780) was the father of one of the most important Spanish writers and dramatists of the neoclassical era, Leandro Fernández de Moratín. He himself was involved in the Spanish literary movement of the day and heavily influenced his son. He wrote Arte de las putas, a poem, and La petimetra, a new comedy. He was also a member of the Tertulia de la Fonda de San Sebastián where he met famous authors like José Cadalso and Tomás de Iriarte.
