= John Macias =

Spanish Dominican friar

Saint John Macias OP
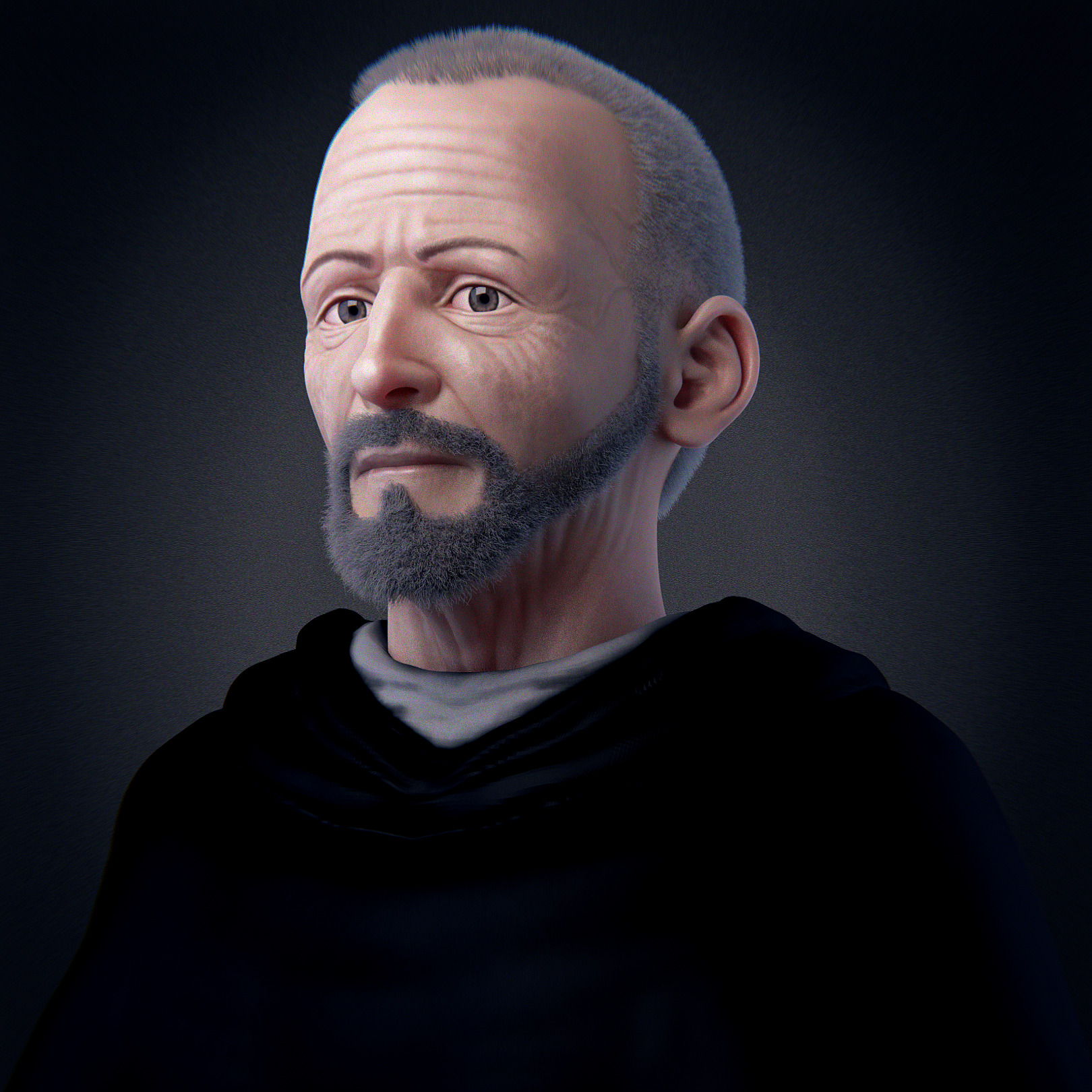
- Forensic facial reconstruction of Macias
- Born: 2 March 1585; Ribera del Fresno, Extremadura, Spain, Spanish Empire
- Died: 16 September 1645; Lima, Viceroyalty of Peru, Spanish Empire
- Venerated in: Catholic Church in Peru
- Beatified: 29 October 1837 by Pope Gregory XVI
- Canonized: 28 September 1975 by Pope Paul VI
- Major shrine: Basilica of Our Lady of the Rosary, Lima, Peru
- Feast: 18 September

John Macías (or Massias, born Juan de Arcas y Sánchez; 2 March 1585 – September 16, 1645), was a Spanish-born Dominican friar who evangelized in Peru in 1620. He was canonized in 1975 by Pope Paul VI. His image is located at the main altar of the Basilica of Our Lady of the Rosary of Lima and is venerated by the local laity in Peru. A church was built in his honor in 1970 in San Luis, Lima.

== Biography ==
Juan de Arcas y Sánchez was born on March 2, 1585, in the small town of Ribera del Fresno, Extremadura which was under the jurisdiction of the Palencia Diocese, to Pedro de Arcas and Juana Sánchez. His parents were poor farmers; both died when Juan and his sister Mary were young. Juan was but four years old. The two children were raised by their uncle whose last name, “Macias,” they took as their own. His uncle trained him as a shepherd. Juan would pass the long hours praying the rosary.

When he was about 16 years old, Macias met a Dominican friar while attending Mass in a neighboring village, and he began to consider the possibility of becoming a Dominican. It is said that as he began to seek God's will for his life; he was frequently visited by the Blessed Virgin Mary and by his patron, St. John the Evangelist.

At the age of 25, Macias then started working with a wealthy businessman who offered him an opportunity to travel to South America. He set out for the Americas in 1619, arriving first at Cartagena de Indias, Colombia, then Reino de Nueva Granada, before stopping by Pasto and then Quito, Ecuador, and eventually arriving in Lima, Perú where he would remain for the rest of his life. Juan Macias was young when he set off as an emigrant for the new world. The ships which crossed the seas in those days carried all sorts of people: soldiers led by the lure of gold or glory; missionaries going to preach the Gospel; merchants and those seeking adventure; and also the poverty stricken hoping to find better luck.

According to Father Vincent de Couesnongle, O.P., "[h]e knew what it meant to be uprooted and torn away from his natural surroundings, from everything he was used to. He knew what it is like to plunge into the unknown. He experienced the normal mixture of hopes and fears, and the difficulty of putting down roots and adapting to new ways. He was one of those millions of people who down through the ages have been shuttled from one country to another, not for the fun of it, or for adventure's sake, but because they had to."

On 23 January 1622, Macias entered the Dominican Priory of St. Mary Magdalene in Lima. He entered as a lay brother, a non-ordained friar who, instead of preaching, would do the manual labor necessary in the monastery. One year later on 25 January 1623 he took his final vows. Macias was a contemporary of St. Martin de Porres who was in the Priory of Santo Domingo, (otherwise known as Holy Rosary). Juan was the assistant porter (doorkeeper) at St. Mary Magdalene and lived in the gatehouse.

== Counsel to the rich and poor ==
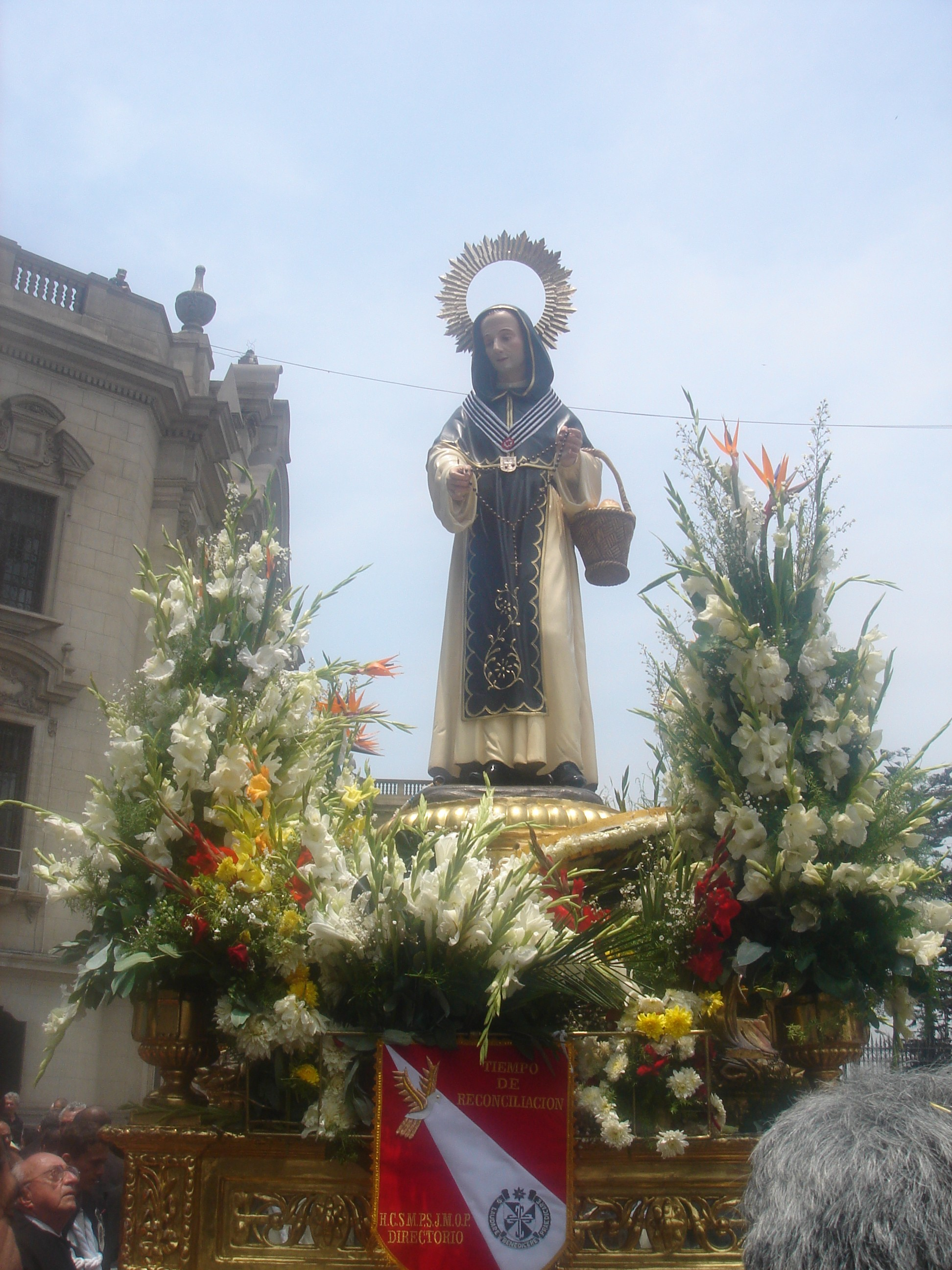
Procession of Juan Macías

John Macias was well known mainly for two things during his life. First, he was known to love the rosary, which he began to pray as a child in Spain while he shepherded his uncle's flock of sheep. Secondly, he was known for his generosity to the poor, 200 of whom he fed every day. He was greatly aided in this by a little donkey that he sent through Lima. He had a small sign put on it asking for donations for the poor. The donkey, knowing his route perfectly, would travel through the streets and come back with benefactions for the city's poor. Often the donkey would stop at certain locations and make loud noises so that the people inside would come out to make their donations.

At the priory, Macías's life was filled with fervent prayer, frequent penance and charity. As a result of his austerity, he quickly fell ill and had to have a risky surgery. Nevertheless, he continued to care for other sick and needy as they waited at the friary gates. Beggars, disabled people and other disadvantaged people were commonplace throughout Lima where they flocked to him at the monastery gates for counsel and comfort. The poor came for food, and the rich for advice.

Macias, however, expressed a greater desire to spend more time in contemplative solitude rather than engage in conversational activities with others. He confessed this to Father Abbot Ramírez who said, “If he were to never follow his vow of obedience, nobody would have ever seen his face." But his official position as the priory's porter, which he held for over 20 years and went against his natural inclinations of solitude, served to continue disciplining his vow of obedience. This filled him with a joyful sense of fulfillment. He died of natural causes in 1645.

== Veneration ==
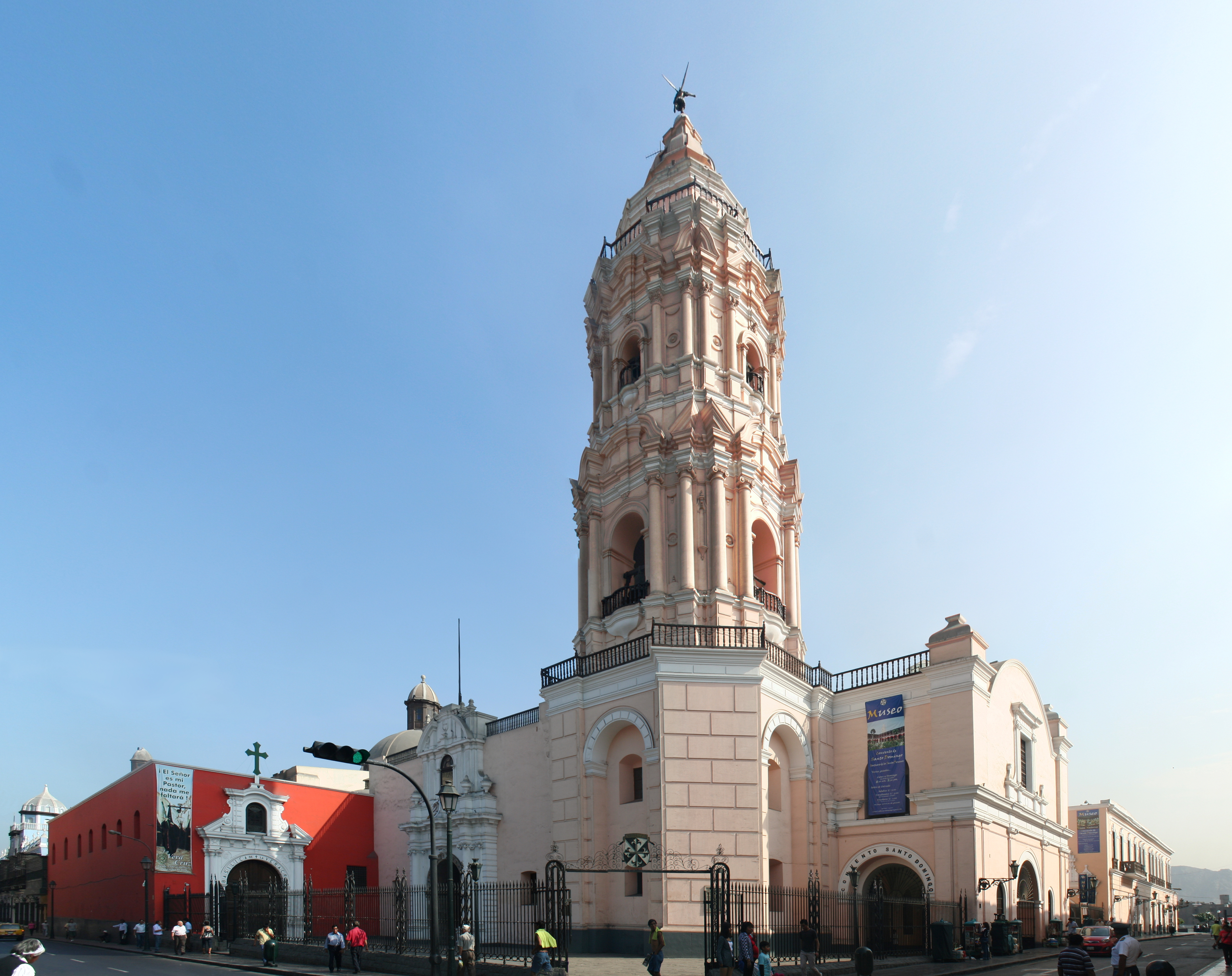
Basilica and Convent of Santo Domingo in Lima, Peru where the remains of St. John Macias rest.

Several miracles were attributed to Macias during his life and after his death which led to his canonization. He was beatified, along with Martin de Porres, in 1837 by Pope Gregory XVI and canonized in 1975 by Pope Paul VI. His feast day is September 18.

An annual public procession also takes place in Peru every third Sunday of November in Lima. Macias' image, along with that of the more famous saint, Martin de Porres, (his friend and fellow Dominican laybrother) are paraded around the streets and venerated by the faithful of Peru.
