= Bernardo de Iriarte (Goya) =

Painting by Francisco Goya

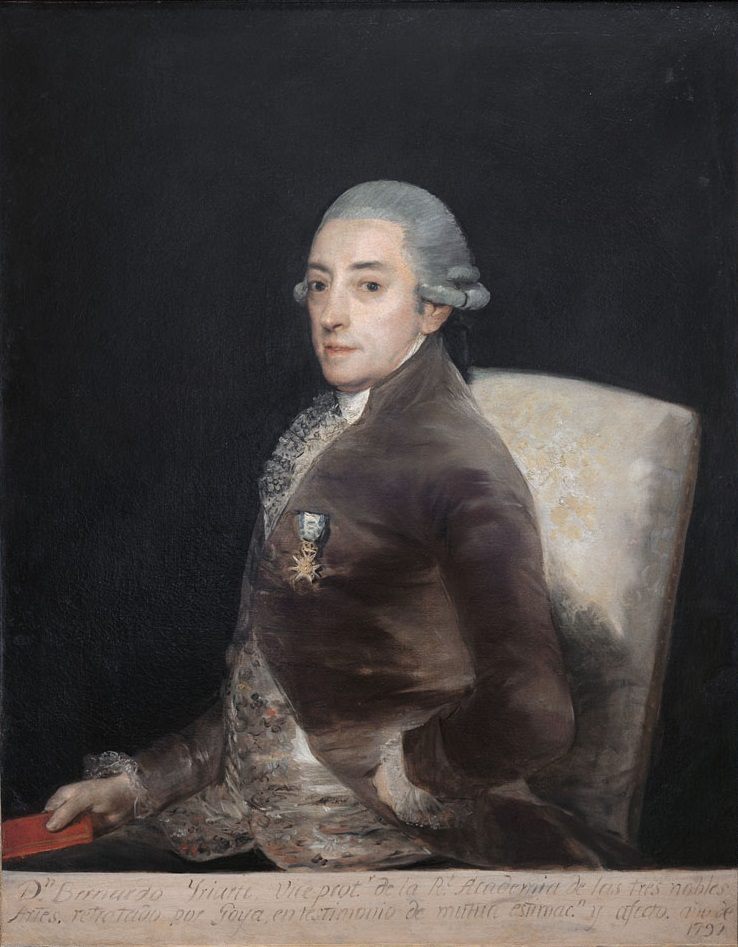
- Artist: Francisco Goya
- Year: 1797
- Medium: oil painting on canvas
- Movement: Portrait painting
- Subject: Bernardo de Iriarte
- Dimensions: 108 cm × 86 cm (43 in × 34 in)
- Location: Musée des Beaux-Arts, Strasbourg
- Accession: 1941

Bernardo de Iriarte is a 1797 portrait painting by the Spanish artist Francisco Goya. It is on display in the Musée des Beaux-Arts of Strasbourg, France. Its inventory number is 1660.

The sitter, Bernardo de Iriarte, was a patron and friend of the painter; the dedicatory inscription at the lower edge is testament to both men's "mutual esteem and affection". At its unveiling, the painting was hailed for its likeness and its virtuosity, and it has been considered a masterpiece ever since.

The painting was acquired in November 1941 from the heirs of Camille Groult by Adolf Wuster and Hans Wendland for the Generalverwaltung der oberrheinischen Museen (General administration of the Upper Rhine museums) at a sale at Hôtel Drouot, and given to the Strasbourg museum. [The accession date was given as 1942 in previous publications.]

The composition of the painting is thought to be inspired by an engraving after Titian's A Man with a Quilted Sleeve (National Gallery, London), then thought to be a portrait of Ariosto. Goya's own 1792 Retrato de Sebastián Martínez y Pérez also anticipates on some aspects of Bernardo de Iriarte as far as the attitude and the gaze of the sitter are concerned.

== See also ==
- List of works by Francisco Goya
