= Bernardo de Iriarte =

Spanish diplomat (1735-1814)

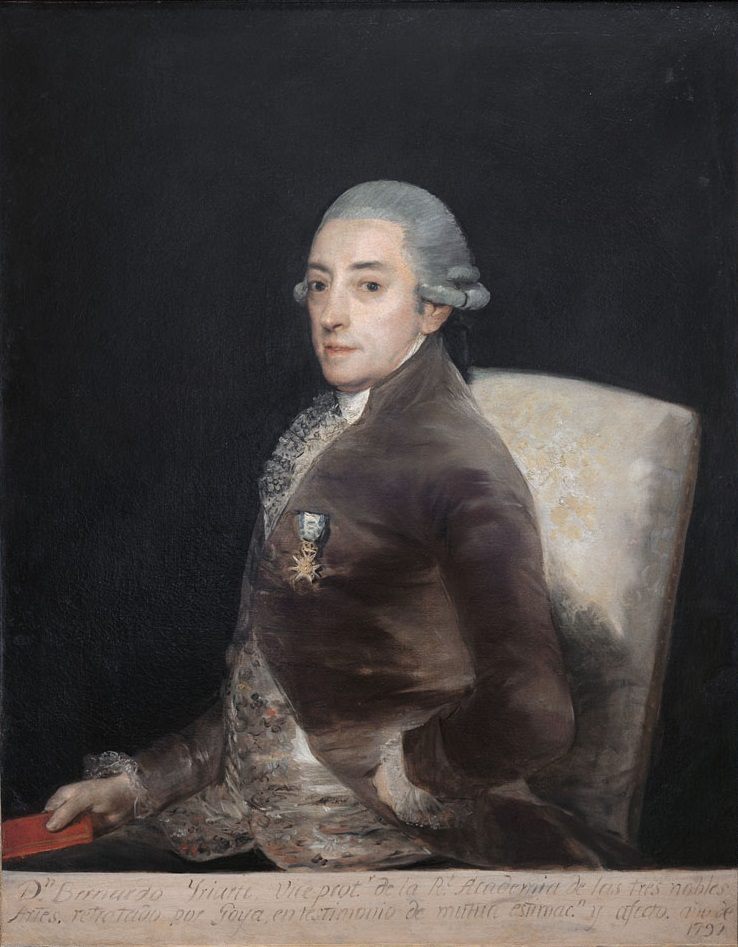
- Retrat de Bernardo Yriate (1797) per Goya
- Born: 18 February 1735
- Died: 13 July 1814
- Occupations: Art collector, university teacher, writer

Bernardo de Iriarte (18 February 1735, Puerto de la Cruz, Tenerife–13 July 1814, Bordeaux) was a Spanish politician and art lover.

== Biography ==
He came from an educated, aristocratic family. His parents, Bernardo de Iriarte y Cisneros, a lieutenant-captain in the Tenerife infantry militia, and Bárbara de las Nieves Rabelo Hernández de Oropesa, had eighteen children. Among them, besides Bernardo, notable figures included Tomás, the famous fabulist; Domingo, the diplomat who negotiated the Peace of Basel; and José, intendant general of the Canary Islands and commissary-administrator for the Royal Armies.
Their uncle was writer and Latinist Juan de Iriarte, who oversaw the education and future of the brothers, exerting a significant influence on their career paths.

Bernardo moved to Madrid at a very young age. From 1754 to 1756, his uncle allowed him to work as an assistant on the compilation of a Latin-Spanish dictionary, tasking him with the letter “C.” Through the intercession of the Marquis of Grimaldi, with whom he would later develop a friendship, he secured a position in the Secretariat of State.

Shortly thereafter, in 1756, he was appointed secretary to the Spanish legation in the Duchy of Parma. He returned to Spain in 1758 and was named an official in the Office of State. In 1760, he became secretary to the Spanish Embassy in London. It appears he was also in Paris on a special mission in 1761.

=== Art lover ===
In addition to his political interests, he had a penchant for literature and the arts. He associated with figures such as Cabarrús, Jovellanos, Urqijo, and the Marquis of Peñaflorida. He frequented the tertulias (literary and social gatherings) held by the Duke and Duchess of Villahermosa at their palace in Madrid. In 1763, he was elected a full member of the Royal Spanish Academy.

He was both a friend and patron to Francisco Goya, and was responsible for some of the names given to Goya's Black Paintings. He was also immortalized in a painting by Goya in 1797.

In 1780, he was appointed supreme minister of the Council of the Indies and in 1787, vice-president of the Board for the Philippines, a position from which he sought to promote the colony's economic progress. In 1792, he was named vice-protector of the Academy of San Fernando and a member of the Board of Trade, Currency, and Mines.
In 1797, he was designated Minister of Agriculture, Commerce, Navigation, and Overseas Possessions.

=== Collaboration with France and exile ===
Around 1804, his friendship with Manuel Godoy came to an end. He was associated with the Afrancesados (those sympathetic to French influence), exiled to Andalusia, and stripped of all his official positions.

After the French invasion, he served as a deputy for Madrid during the negotiations for the city's surrender to Napoleon in 1809. When Joseph Bonaparte ascended the throne, he was appointed a Councilor of State.

Consequently, the return of Ferdinand VII after the French defeat in 1813 forced him into exile, and he eventually died in Bordeaux. In 1798, he had married Antonia Sáez de Tejada y Hermoso; the couple had no children.

=== Art collection ===
He was an art critic and collector; his collection of paintings was well-known throughout Europe. It included works by Goya, Mengs (his Self-Portrait), Murillo (Portrait of a Gentleman with a collar), Velázquez, Ribera, and Van Dyck. His collection was auctioned off in London and Paris following his death, particularly during the 1820s.
