= Kunsthalle Praha =

- Kunsthalle Praha

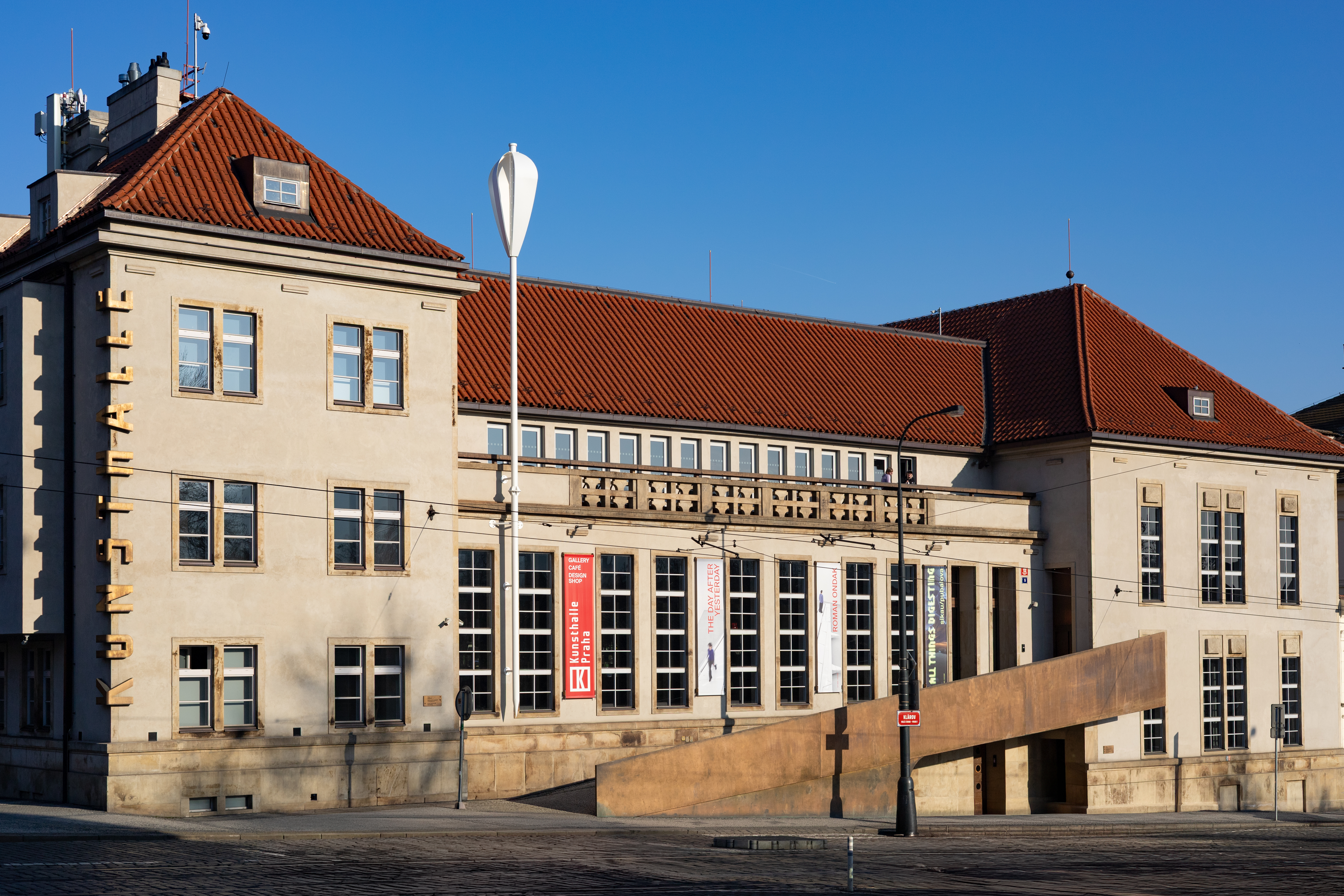
- Kunsthalle Praha in March 2026
- Interactive fullscreen map
- Established: 2022; 4 years ago
- Location: Klárov 132/5, Prague 1, 118 00
- Coordinates: 50.09232°N 14.40963°E
- Type: Art museum
- Collections: Modern, Contemporary
- Director: Ivana Goossen
- Website: www.kunsthallepraha.org

The Kunsthalle Praha is a private art museum for contemporary art that opened in February 2022. It is located in the Czech capital Prague. The museum is housed in a former cultural monument, the Zenger Transformation Station building. The director and CEO of the Kunsthalle Praha Foundation is Bulgarian Ivana Goossen.

The museum is supported by the non-profit Pudil Family Foundation, which wanted to create a platform with Kunsthalle Praha to promote the understanding and appreciation of Czech and international modern and contemporary art.

== Name of the museum ==
According to the Pudil Family Foundation, a conscious decision was made to use the German-language term “Kunsthalle“ in the name of the museum, on the one hand to refer to Prague's multicultural roots as a city of three nations and two languages, and on the other hand to point to Prague's cultural significance in the 19th and first half of the 20th century; where Czechs, Germans and the Jewish community lived together.

== Collection mission, tasks and programme ==
The museum has set itself the task of contributing to a better understanding of Czech and international art of the 20th and 21st centuries. Therefore, the museum is committed to established and emerging artists from Central Europe, as well as to discovering artistic trends and periods that are underrepresented or little known in the Czech Republic. The museum also serves as a platform for international artistic exchange, collaborating with nonprofit organizations in the USA and Great Britian to facilitate residencies for artists and curators.

Kunsthalle Praha defines its core mission as the following:

"We connect the Czech and international art scenes, present innovative perspectives on 20th and 21st century art and culture, engaging the broadest possible audience."

Kunsthalle Praha’s collection of modern and contemporary art consists of more than 2000 works, thematically focusing on the significant historical movements and tendencies of the 20th and 21st centuries in Central Europe. Described as a “living and evolving” body of work, within an international context, the museum’s holdings primarily consist of the Pudil Family Foundation collection, which has been on long-term loan to the museum. After the establishment of Kunsthalle Praha, Pavlina and Petr Pudil’s collecting strategy has shifted to a public model, focusing on acquisitions, partnerships, and long-term loans, with an emphasis on conservation, research, and presentation. The institution also has acquired collections from Maria and Milan Knížák, which represents a major collection of works from the Fluxus movement, as well as the private collection of Eva and Petr Zeman.

To realise its mission, the museum has developed an international programme of temporary exhibitions of modern and contemporary art and innovative educational activities. The museum also maintains a range of public programmes for children and adults, which connect its collection to current cultural topics and technological trends. Through its funding, Kunsthalle Praha offers free educational tours to its exhibitions and interactive workshops for students at all levels. In addition, the museum organises courses for the public centred around art history and theory, such as Art 101, given in English, and TransformArt, given in Czech.

== Facilities ==
The museum has a total floor space of approximately 5700 square metres. It includes exhibition spaces for 3 galleries, venues for educational programmes and other cultural and social events. A terrace on the roof of the building is open to the public as a viewing café. Other facilities include a booklounge and a design shop. Rooms for depots are located in the basement.

== History of the building ==
The Kunsthalle is located below Prague Castle in the Malá Strana district. The building was originally constructed between 1930 and 1931 by the City of Prague Electricity Works as a transformer station. Previously, there was a barrack on the site. The design by architect Vilém Kvasnička was executed in the neoclassical style, which corresponds to the historical character of the area. The Transformation Station was named after the physicist and meteorologist Václav Zenger, a professor at the Czech Technical University in Prague.

The building was declared a cultural monument by the Czech Ministry of Culture in April 2015. The owner at the time then sold the building to a real estate company, which is a joint-stock company owned by Petr Pudil and his wife Pavlina. In 2016, the Pudil couple decided to convert the building into an art museum for their private art collection through their non-profit foundation, the Pudil Family Foundation.

The conversion and extension of the building was undertaken by the Prague-based project office Schindler Seko Architekti s.r.o.. During the reconstruction, the building was completely gutted, leaving only the perimeter walls of the original cultural monument.

On 31 October 2022, the reconstruction won the Czech National Architecture Award 2022.

== Exhibitions ==
| Year | Dates | Artist, collection or project | Curator, curatorial team | Exhibition |
|---|---|---|---|---|
| 2022 | 22 February – 29 August | — | Peter Weibel, Christelle Havranek | Kinetismus. 100 Years of Electricity in Art |
| 2022 | 22 February – 30 May | — | Vendula Hnídková | The Zenger Transformer Station: Electricity in the City, Electricity in Architecture |
| 2022 | 1 July – 30 September | Karel Babíček’s Collection | Lenka Lindaurová, Christelle Havranek | Midnight of Art. Ways of Collecting |
| 2022–2023 | 29 September – 13 February | Gregor Hildebrandt | Christelle Havranek | A Blink of an Eye and the Years are Behind Us |
| 2022–2023 | 13 October – 8 January | Filip Hodas, Martin Houra, Johana Kroft, Jana Stýblová, Jakub Špaček, Ondřej Zunka & Zünc Studio | Iva Polanecká (Kunsthalle Praha), Daniel Burda, Mario Kunovský and Martin Pošta (Signal Festival) | Invisible Forces |
| 2022–2023 | 18 December – 14 February | Jiří David | – | The Blue Heart |
| 2023 | 9 February – 1 May | Markéta Magidová | Andra Silapēter | My Sweet Inedible Planet |
| 2023–2024 | 23 March – 16 October | — | Russell Ferguson | BOHEMIA: History of an Idea, 1950–2000 |
| 2023 | 9 June – 10 September | Ovidiu Șandor Collection | Tevž Logar | LOST IN THE MOMENT THAT FOLLOWS |
| 2023–2024 | 12 October – 19 January | Lunchmeat Studio | Iva Polanecká (Kunsthalle Praha, Aw! Lab) | The Grief of Misfit Cathedrals |
| 2023–2024 | 16 November – 22 April | Elmgreen & Dragset | Christelle Havranek, Barbora Ropková | READ |
| 2024 | 1 March – 3 June | John Sanborn | Barbora Ropková | Notes on Us |
| 2024 | 30 May – 28 October | Lucia Moholy | Meghan Forbes, Jan Tichy , and Jordan Troeller | Exposures |
| 2024 | 28 June – 13 September | Ester Geislerová | Christelle Havranek, Denisa Václavová | What We Should’ve Said but Didn’t |
| 2024 | 4 September – 25 November | Jon Rafman | Martina Freitag | Nine Eyes of Google Street View |
| 2024–2025 | 10 October – 13 January | United Visual Artists | Iva Polanecká (Kunsthalle Praha), Pavel Mrkus and Martin Pošta (Signal Festival) | Strange Attractions |
| 2024–2025 | 28 November – 28 April | Chiharu Shiota | Christelle Havranek | The Unsettled Soul |
| 2025 | 7 February – 10 March | SHOTBY.US | Iva Polanecká | Space of Desire (Czech Grand Design 2024) |
| 2025 | 25 April – 31 August | Kristyna and Marek Milde | Theo Carnegy-Tan, Kristyna and Marek Milde | Call of the Forest |
| 2025 | 5 June – 13 October | Anna-Eva Bergman & Hans Hartung | Theo Carnegy-Tan (Kunsthalle Praha), Pierre Wat (Fondation Hartung-Bergman) | And We'll Never Be Parted |
| 2025 | 1 September – 11 October | Fluxus | Barbora Ropková, Štefan Tóth | Delivered by Post |
| 2025–2026 | 10 October – 19 January | Alice Bucknell | Lívia Nolasco-Rózsás | Persistent Worlds |
| 2025–2026 | 13 November – 9 March | Roman Ondak | Barbora Ropková | The Day After Yesterday |
| 2026 | 13 February – 11 May | sikau/pubalova | Iva Polanecká | ALL THINGS DIGESTING |
| 2026 | 16 April – 7 September | William Kentridge | Christelle Havranek | The Battle Between YES and NO |
| 2026 | 19 June – 8 October | Kunsthalle Praha Collection | Tevž Logar | Memory of Touch: Chapter I |

=== Long-term installations ===
| Year | Artist | Work | Curator | Location |
|---|---|---|---|---|
| 2022 | Mark Dion | Cabinet of Electrical Curiosities | Christelle Havranek | Third floor, near the café |
| 2023 | schwestern (Iveta Šalamounová & Monika Cihlářová) | Watchtower | Martina Freitag | Tower, the highest point of the building |
| 2026 | Lexová&Smetana | Pin | Martina Freitag | Building exterior |
