= Juan de Iriarte =

Spanish writer

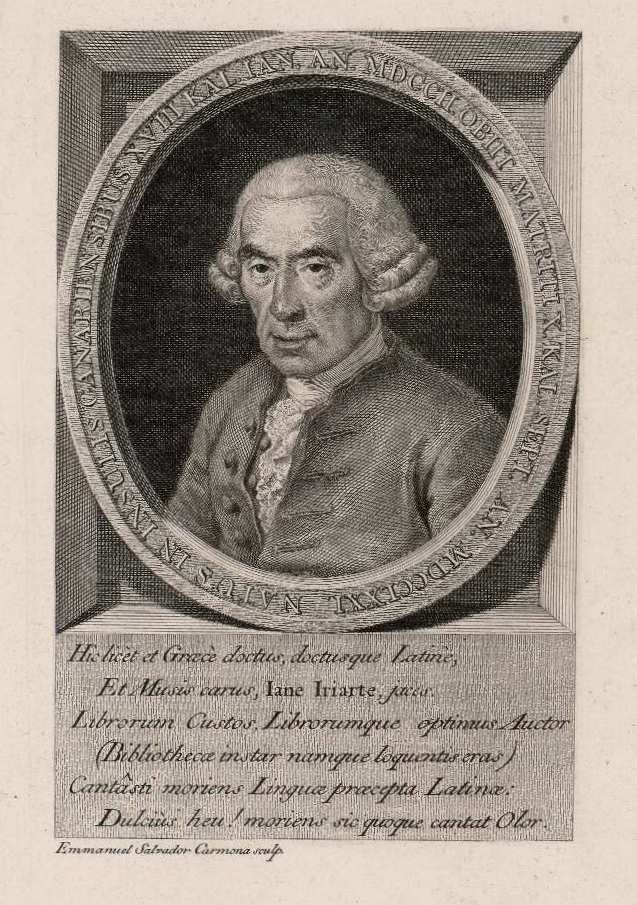
- Born: 15 December 1702; Puerto de la Orotava, Spain
- Died: 23 August 1771 (aged 68); Madrid, Spain

Seat Z of the Real Academia Española
- In office 21 September 1747 – 23 August 1771
- Preceded by: Miguel Gutiérrez de Valdivia
- Succeeded by: Pedro de Silva y Sarmiento de Alagón

Juan de Iriarte (sometimes y Cisneros) (15 December 1702–23 August 1771) was a Spanish writer, translator, Hellenist, and Latinist. He was the uncle of poet and playwright Tomás de Iriarte, diplomat Bernardo de Iriarte, and diplomat Domingo de Iriarte.

== Biography ==
Juan de Iriarte was born at Puerto de la Orotava (now Puerto de la Cruz), on the island of Tenerife in the Canary Islands. At age 11 he was sent to Paris to complete his education. Two years later he went to Rouen in the company of his father's friend Pierre Hély (né Peter O'Hely, 1652–1731, former French consul to the Canaries). So impressive was the boy's progress in every subject that it was decided to send him to the Lycée Louis-le-Grand in Paris, where one of his classmates was Voltaire. He spent the next eight years there. In 1723 he moved to London to complete his studies, with the result that he mastered Greek, Latin, French, and English just as well as his native tongue (Spanish).

Afterward he returned to Tenerife, but finding there his father dead and his academic talents unusable, left again in 1724 for Madrid, where he obtained the protection of the Scottish Jesuit Guillermo Clarke, confessor of Philip V. In April 1729 he was appointed clerk (escribiente) of the recently formed Biblioteca Real under chief librarian Juan Ferreras — a minor post, but one which at least justified his continued residence at court. Ferreras also found him employment as a private tutor for the eldest sons of the Duke of Béjar and the Duke of Alba, and for the infante Don Manuel de Portugal. In his capacity as clerk, he edited in 1729 the first catalog published by the Biblioteca Real, the Regia Matritensis Bibliotheca Geographica et Chronologica. In January 1732 he was promoted to librarian (bibliotecario de asiento), a post sufficient to allow him to devote himself fully to his literary and philological pursuits.

He was responsible for part of the review of Ignacio de Luzán's Poética in the Diario de los Literatos (1737). For much of his life he wrote and revised a lengthy Gramática latina en verso castellano, with commentary in prose. For this reason in February 1742 the Marquis de Villarias appointed him as the official translator to the Spanish Secretary of State. In this capacity he translated into Latin dispatches for the various courts of Europe, as well as inscriptions for royal tombs, palaces, and other architecture. In 1743 he was named a supernumerary member of the Real Academia Española, and in September 1747 he became a full member. In 1752 he was elected to the Real Academia de Bellas Artes de San Fernando.

His principal contributions to lexicography were the opening verses of his Sobre la imperfección de los diccionarios and his efforts as director of the enormous, royally mandated Diccionario latino-español. He also composed a Paleografía griega and a Bibliotheca graeca, in which he catalogued more than 50 Greek codices originally produced by the copyist Constantine Lascaris and now held in the Biblioteca Real. His Lista de los Principales Manuscritos de la Librería de los Marqueses de Villena (1748) is held at the library of the Fundación Juan March. Iriarte also convinced his friend, the historian Enrique Flórez, to embark on his monumental España sagrada. Finally, he excelled as a Latin poet; his Latin verses — such as Tauromaquia matritensis, sive taurorum ludi (1725) — were as celebrated as those he composed in Spanish. He also composed 140 epigrams, of which he leaves us the following definition:

Iriarte's text

A la abeja semejante,
para que cause placer,
el epigrama ha de ser
pequeño, dulce y punzante.

Translation

Similar to the bee,
to induce pleasure,
the epigram must be
small, sweet, and sharp.

Iriarte's epigrams are constructed in octosyllabic verse, generally redondillas or cuartetas asonantadas, and in a neoclassical style. For example, this epigram comparing Luis de Góngora to the Greek poet Lycophron, whose Alexandra was notoriously difficult reading even in his own time:

Iriarte's text

Del obscuro Licofrón
mereces, Góngora, el nombre;
que si él fue griego entre griegos,
tú eres griego entre españoles.

Translation

You, Góngora, merit the epithet
of Lycophron the obscure;
for if he was a Greek among Greeks,
you are a Greek among Spaniards.

Iriarte's above-mentioned Gramática latina en verso castellano was first printed in 1764, and then again in 1771, shortly after his death, at the instigation of his nephew Tomás de Iriarte. His minor works were collected in two volumes, published 1774, its frontispiece being a portrait of Iriarte drawn by Mariano Salvador Maella and engraved by Manuel Salvador Carmona.

== Works ==
- Tauromaquia matritensis, sive taurorum ludi ("Bullfighting in Madrid, or the Sport of the Bull") (1725)
- Regia Matritensis Bibliotheca (1729)
- Sobre la imperfección de los diccionarios, discurso de ingreso en la Real Academia Española de la Lengua (1747)
- Lista de los Principales Manuscritos de la Librería de los Marqueses de Villena. Sacada de la Hijuela Authentica de los bienes que quedaron por muerte del Marqués Don Andrés Pacheco, en 9 de Octubre de 1748. Por la tarde por mí mismo
- Colección de refranes castellanos traducidos en metros latinos (1749)
- Advertencias sobre la sintaxis castellana (1755)
- Sobre los verbos reflexivos y recíprocos (1756)
- Paleografía griega (1760)
- Gramática latina, en verso castellano. Madrid: Pedro Marin. 1771.
- Bibliotheca graeca
- Obras sueltas de don Juan de Yriarte (Madrid, 1774), in two volumes:
  - Obras sueltas. Vol. I.
  - Obras sueltas. Vol. II.
