= Ribera del Fresno =

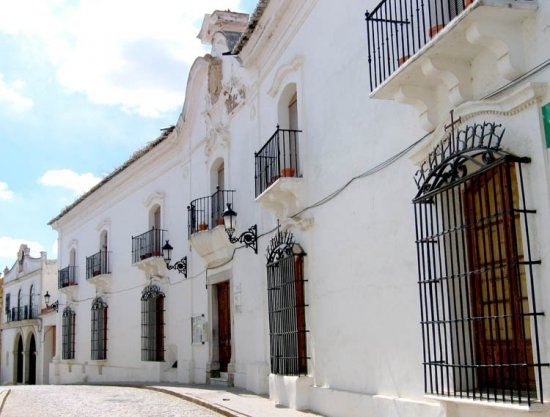
- Casa-Palacio de los Vargas-Zúñiga.

- Coat of arms

- Location in Spain.
- Coordinates: 38°32′N 6°13′W
- Country: Spain
- Autonomous community: Extremadura
- Province: Badajoz
- Comarca: Tierra de Barros

Government
  - Mayor: Antonio Fernández García

Area
  - Total: 185.6 km^{2} (71.7 sq mi)
- Elevation: 399 m (1,309 ft)

Population (2025-01-01)
  - Total: 3,130
  - Density: 16.9/km^{2} (43.7/sq mi)
- Time zone: UTC+1 (CET)
  - Summer (DST): UTC+2 (CEST)
- Website: Official website

Ribera del Fresno is a municipality located in the province of Badajoz, Extremadura, Spain. As of 2009, the municipality has a population of 3,466 inhabitants.

It is the hometown of friar Juan Macias.

== See also ==
- List of municipalities in Badajoz
