= Domingo d'Yriarte =

Spanish diplomat and aristocrat (1746–1795)

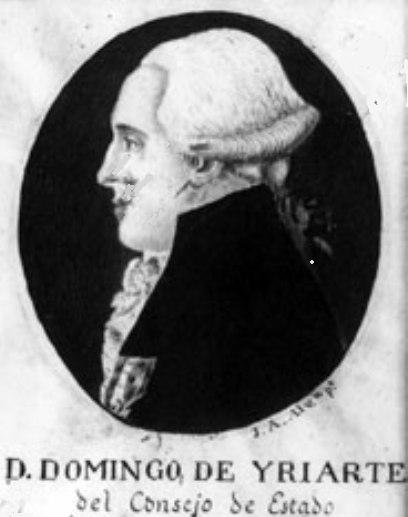
Don Domingo de Iriarte

Don Domingo d'Yriarte, also spelled de Yriarte or Iriarte (1746–1795), was a Spanish diplomat.

== Biography ==
D'Yriarte was born in Tenerife in 1746. Relative of Juan d'Yriarte and Bernardo d'Yriarte, also diplomats and officials in Spanish service. He entered into the Spanish diplomatic service, serving as a secretary to ambassadors in Vienna (Austria) and Paris (France), and later as an ambassador in Warsaw, Polish–Lithuanian Commonwealth. He was one of the last foreign diplomats to vacate his post in Warsaw following the Third Partition of Poland and the end of the Polish–Lithuanian Commonwealth in 1795. Signed the Peace of Basel on July 22 and died on 22 November that year.
