= Jan Tichy =

Jan Tichy (born 1974) is a Chicago-based artist and educator, born in Czechoslovakia.

== Biography ==
Jan Tichy is a contemporary artist and educator working in video, sculpture, architecture, and photography. Born in Prague in 1974, Tichy studied art in Israel before moving to Chicago.

== Education ==
Tichy studied at the Musrara School of Photography and New Media in Jerusalem and at the Advanced Studies in Fine Art and Photography program at the Bezalel Academy of Art and Design in Tel Aviv. He earned his MFA from the School of the Art Institute of Chicago where he is now Assistant Professor at the Department of Photography.

== Solo exhibitions ==
2019

Weight of Light, Museum Bensheim, Germany

2014

aroundcenter, Chicago Cultural Center

2013

Politics of Light, No Longer Empty & Richard Gray Gallery, NYC; Overlap, Hezi Cohen Gallery, Tel Aviv; Jan Tichy, Helen Day Art Center, Stowe, WA

2012

MATRIX 164, Wadsworth Atheneum, Hartford, CT; 1979:1-2012:21, Museum of Contemporary Photography; Project Cabrini Green, Gordon Gallery, Tel Aviv

! 2011 Installation No.13, Nathan Gottesdiener Prize, Tel Aviv Museum of Art;

2010

01:37:24:05, Center for Contemporary Art, Tel Aviv; Installation No. 10, Spertus Museum, Chicago

2009

Installations, Richard Gray Gallery, Chicago; Recent Works, Museum of Contemporary Art, Bat Yam, Israel

2008

12*12, Museum of Contemporary Art, Chicago

2007

1391, Herzliya Museum of Contemporary Art

2004

Beton, Morel Derfler Gallery, Jerusalem

== Public collections ==
- Museum of Modern Art
- MAGASIN III
- Museum of Contemporary Photography
- Indianapolis Museum of Art
- Israel Museum Jerusalem

== Awards and Prizes ==
2012 Faculty Enrichment Grant, The School of the Art Institute of Chicago

2011 Gold Award in the Council for Advancement and Support of Education

2010 Nathan Gottesdiener Foundation, The Israeli Art Prize

2009 MFA Fellowship Award, The School of the Art Institute of Chicago

2008 America-Israel Cultural Foundation Scholarship
