= Maria José Arjona =

Maria José Arjona (born 1972, Bogotá, Colombia) is a multidisciplinary performance artist working between New York City and Bogotá. Her work investigates notions of time, body, and power. In 2024, she was a visiting scholar in the Department of Performance Studies at New York University Tisch School of the Arts and the DAAD Artists-in-Berlin program resident for the 2024-2025 cycle, in Germany.

== Early life, education, and influences ==
Maria José Arjona grew up in Colombia. She was initially trained as a professional dancer and later graduated from the Academia Superior de Artes de Bogotá, with a master's in plastic arts with an emphasis on performance art and installation art. Arjona studied under Colombian performance artist Maria Teresa Hincapié and philosopher Consuelo Pabon.

In 2001, Maria José Arjona moved from Bogotá to New York City, where she lived and worked for fifteen years. In an interview to curator and art historian Cecilia Fajardo-Hill for Bomb Magazine in 2018, the artist mentions moving on the day of the 9/11 events.

Arjona attended an artist lecture by performance artist Marina Abramović in 2007 at the Patricia & Phillip Frost Art Museum, Miami, and connected with Abramović via email afterward, which led them to an artistic exchange over the years. In 2010, Arjona participated as a re-performer in Marina Abramović's career retrospective The Artist Is Present at the Museum of Modern Art, New York.

== Work ==
Maria José Arjona's practice focuses on time-based practices such as durational performance and installation. Arjona's work often involves the artist's own body. She has discussed how poetry and the literary world play a central role in her artistic development. For instance, the writings of Jorge Luis Borges such as A New Refutation of Time have influenced her work. Additionally, common to her work is the practice of re-enactments; she has re-enacted performance compositions by other artists and created re-enactments of her own work.

In 2003, Arjona was the first international performance artist selected to reside and work in Ballroom Marfa, Texas. For the Chinati Open House of that season, she presented a site-specific wall drawing created over the course of three days. Titled Vault, the durational performance piece was made of charcoal.

Arjona was an artist-in-residence at the Metropolitan Museum of Manila, Philippines, in 2016, in which she created the performance piece Practice after being introduced to the local culture and Filipino dance manifestations.

Miami Dade College's Museum of Art and Design (MOAD) facilitated the presentation of Arjona's performance All the Others in Me in 2018. The artwork touched on the objectification of the female figure throughout times.

Her work has been featured in international art events such as the Thessaloniki Biennale and the Guangzhou Triennale. She has had solo shows at the Bogotá Museum of Modern Art (2018), and performance presentations at the Louvre, Paris; Museum of Fine Arts, Boston; and Madre Museum, Italy, among others. Maria José Arjona's work is included in the collection of the Pérez Art Museum Miami, Florida.

In 2022, she participated in Miami Basel performing from a suspended chair during the event. In the work, the artist laid horizontally from a six-and-a-half-feet height while visitors attended the fair.
