= Manuel María de Arjona =

Spanish poet and writer

Manuel María de Arjona (1771–1820) was a Spanish poet and writer.

== Bibliography ==
- A Albino
- A Cicerón
- Al amor
- El autor a sí mismo
- La diosa del bosque
- Triste cosa es gemir entre cadenas
- A la memoria
- Necesidades de España que deben remediarse en las próximas Cortes
- A la Inmaculada Concepción
- Al pueblo hebreo
- A Cicerón
- A la muerte de San Fernando
- A la decadencia de la gloria de Sevilla
- España restaurada en Cádiz
