= Edigrup Media =

Spanish media company

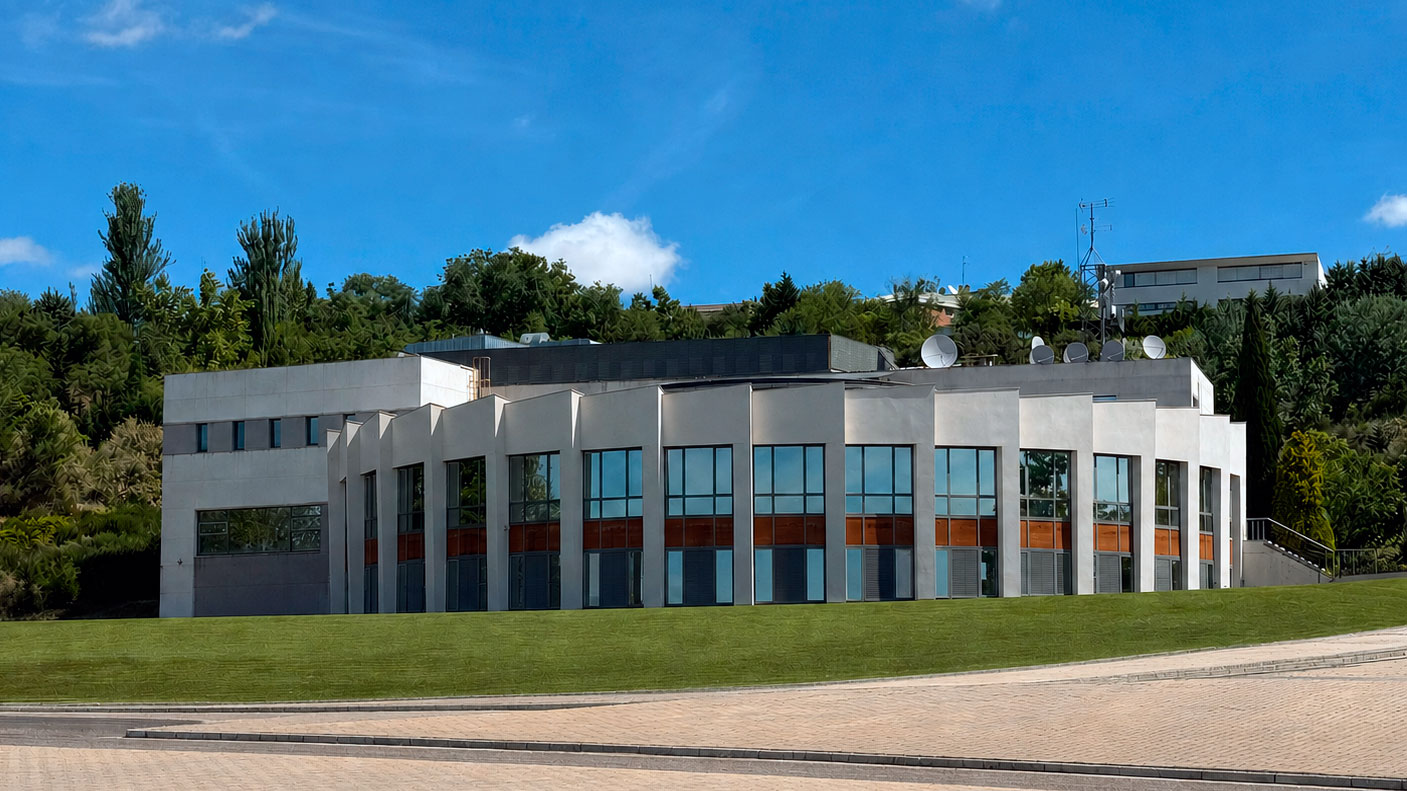
- Edigrup Media headquarters in Valladolid
- Type: Privately held company
- Industry: Mass media
- Founded: 1990 (operations); 2012 (corporate brand)
- Headquarters: Valladolid, Spain
- Area served: Castile and León
- Products: Newspapers; Radio broadcasting; Television; Digital media
- Subsidiaries: Diario de León; El Correo de Burgos; Heraldo-Diario de Soria; Diario de Valladolid; Diario de Castilla y León; esRadio Castilla y León; CyLTV (50%)
- Website: www.edigrup.es

Edigrup Media is a Spanish media group headquartered in Valladolid, regarded as the leading media group in Castile and León. Although the corporate brand was formally established in 2012, its operations date back to 1990.

Active in print, radio, television and digital media, the group publishes five newspapers (Diario de León, El Correo de Burgos, Heraldo-Diario de Soria, Diario de Valladolid and Diario de Castilla y León), operates esRadio Castilla y León (18 stations) and holds a stake in Castilla y León Televisión (CyLTV).

== History ==
=== Origins and cable television era (1990–2004) ===
The group's origins lie in 1990 with the launch of Canal 0 in León (Teleón S.A.), a pioneering local cable television channel in Spain. Following the enactment of the 1995 Cable Telecommunications Act, Begar led the creation of Retecal, the operator awarded by the Ministry of Public Works the single cable franchise for Castile and León, which integrated 17 local networks to offer telephony, internet and television services.

In May 2004, Retecal was absorbed by ONO, although its content operations and local television licences had previously been spun off and grouped under the independent brand Televisión Castilla y León.

=== Expansion and strategic alliances (2000–2009) ===
From 2000 onwards, the group consolidated a network of 18 local television channels reaching 90% of the regional population. In parallel, it expanded into print media through acquisitions and partnerships with Unidad Editorial, incorporating El Correo de Burgos (2002), Diario de Soria (2006) and the historic Diario de León (2007).

In the radio sector, after being awarded several FM frequencies in the region in 1999, the group established the regional chain Castilla y León Radio in 2000. In 2004, it entered a strategic alliance with the Vocento group to co-found the national chain Punto Radio, acquiring a 10% shareholding and integrating its stations under the brand Punto Radio Castilla y León. The group was the network's leading partner in the region for nearly a decade.

Outside Castile and León, the group managed Oviedo Televisión until 2002 and expanded into the Valencian Community through Mediamed Comunicación Digital. This subsidiary operated 13 DTT licences under the brand Tele 7 following the award by the Generalitat Valenciana in 2006, though it ceased operations in 2009. Additionally, between 2008 and 2009, the group took control of Televisión Municipal de Valencia (TMV) after acquiring a majority stake from the original franchisee.

=== The RTVCyL model and birth of Edigrup (2009–2012) ===
With the aim of bidding for licences for two regional DTT channels, and following pressure from the Junta de Castilla y León to consolidate the sector, Televisión Castilla y León and Canal 4 Castilla y León submitted a joint bid through the company Radio Televisión de Castilla y León, S.A. (RTVCyL). The consortium was awarded the licence in January 2009, giving rise to Spain's first fully privately managed regional public-service broadcaster.

In May 2012, the Edigrup Media brand was officially established to bring all the group's media outlets under a single independent corporate structure.

=== Consolidation (2013–present) ===
In 2013, the group acquired from Unidad Editorial the titles El Mundo-Diario de Valladolid and El Mundo de Castilla y León (later renamed Diario de Castilla y León), consolidating its editorial partnership with El Mundo and its presence across the main provinces of Castile and León.

In the radio sector, the same year saw the group's stations rebranded as esRadio Castilla y León, following the dissolution of Punto Radio and a new agreement with Libertad Digital.

In September 2017, Edigrup and the Henneo group agreed to merge their respective newspapers in Soria (Diario de Soria and Heraldo de Soria), creating the joint title Heraldo-Diario de Soria.

== Media outlets ==
=== Print press ===
Newspaper	Coverage area	Founded	Headquarters
Diario de León	León	1906	León
Heraldo-Diario de Soria	Soria	1913	Soria
Diario de Valladolid	Valladolid	1991	Valladolid
Diario de Castilla y León	Castile and León	1993	Valladolid
El Correo de Burgos	Burgos	1999	Burgos

=== Radio and television ===
- esRadio Castilla y León: A regional network of 18 FM stations combining national programming from esRadio with local content.
- Castilla y León Televisión (50%): Operator of the regional DTT channels La 7 (regional programming) and La 8 (local opt-outs).

== Partnerships ==
- Unidad Editorial: Joint distribution of its print newspapers with El Mundo.
- Henneo: Partner in Heraldo-Diario de Soria.
- Libertad Digital: Agreement for the operation of esRadio Castilla y León.
- UnionMedia: Alliance of regional press publishers (founding member).

== See also ==
- Mass media in Spain
