= Diario Palentino =

Spanish daily newspaper

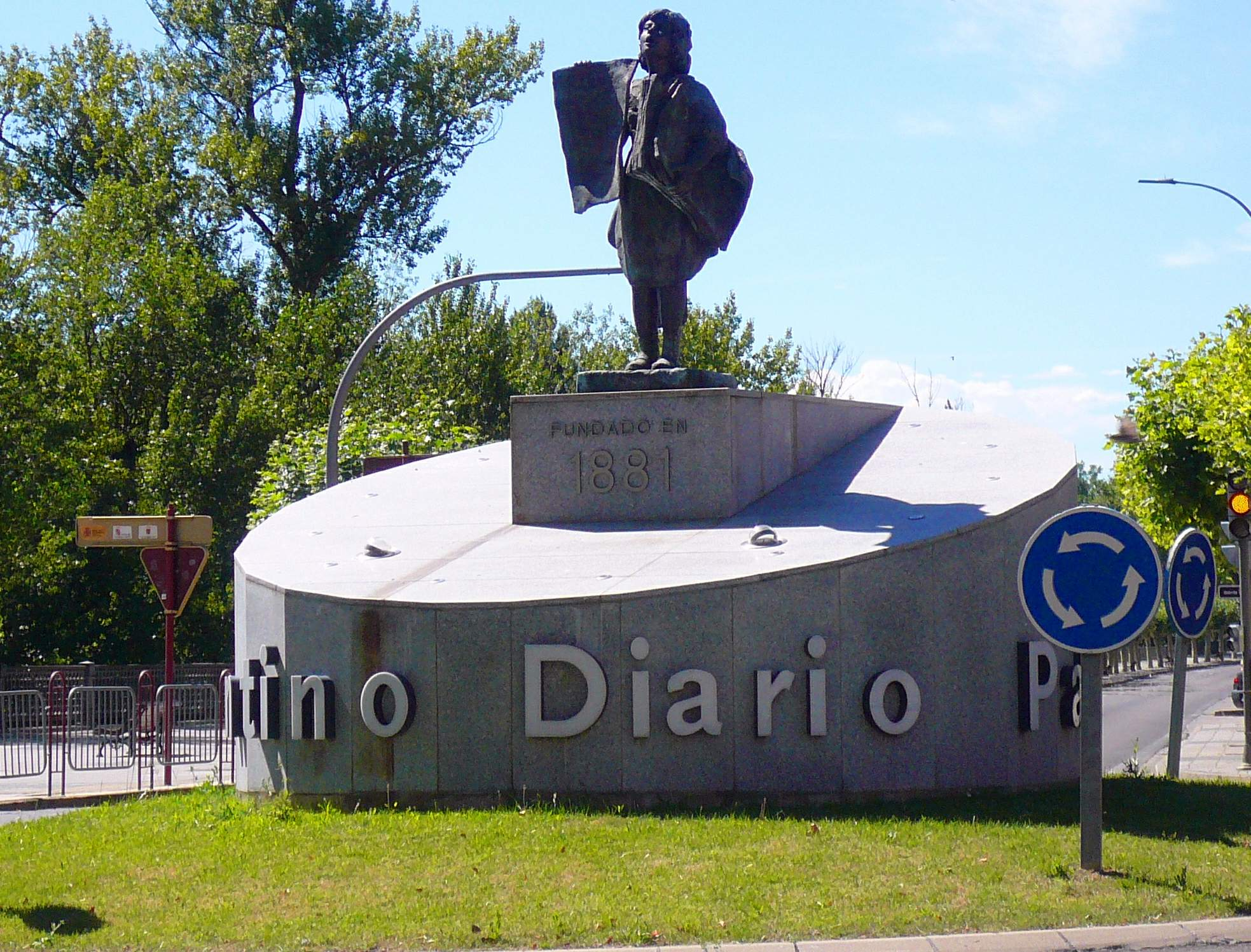
- Roundabout dedicated to the Diario Palentino in Palencia
- Type: Daily newspaper
- Owner(s): Promecal
- Founder(s): José Alonso Rodríguez
- Editor: El Día de Palencia, S.A.
- Price: 1,20 € (2011)
- Founded: May 15, 1881
- Language: Spanish
- Headquarters: Palencia
- City: Province of Palencia
- Country: Spain
- Circulation: 4.991
- Website: diariopalentino.es

The Diario Palentino is a general information newspaper published in the Spanish city of Palencia. With more than a century of journalistic activity, it currently belongs to the Promecal group.

== History ==
It was founded on 15 May 1881, (Note: According to Félix Buisán Cítores, before 1881 it had been published under the title El Crepúsculo —originated on September 1st, 1879— (Buisán Cítores, 1983, p. 13). On 15 May 1881 it changed its masthead to El Diario de Palencia, although a few years later it changed its title again and adopted El Diario Palentino on 12 February 1883 (Buisán Cítores, 1983, p. 13), which it has maintained until the present day.) under the initiative of José Alonso Rodríguez. It was a publication of Catholic ideology and very conservative, although independent. José Alonso de Ojeda was the director of Diario Palentino for more than half a century. During the Second Republic, the publication maintained an editorial line close to the CEDA.

In January 1941 it merged with another existing conservative newspaper in Palencia called El Día de Palencia, owned by Abundio Zurita — a Catholic confessional newspaper established on 1 October 1890— and was renamed El Diario Palentino-El Día de Palencia. From the 1980s onwards, the ownership of the newspaper was acquired by the Alonso family who, in 1998, sold 95% of the ownership of the newspaper to Grupo Promecal, the publishing company of Diario de Burgos, which took charge of its complete updating, changing its headquarters and providing it with new media and technology.

Its headquarters are located in Calle Mayor de Palencia, and it shares it with its colleagues of the Promecal group, Canal 4 (integrated since 2009 in Castilla y León Televisión). It also has two regional offices in Guardo and Aguilar de Campoo, run by Sandra Macho and Marta Redondo respectively.

According to the OJD, in the period July 2005/June 2006, the average circulation was 4991 copies, with a circulation of 4365.

It was one of the few Spanish evening dailies until the 1990s.

The Sociedad Estatal Correos y Telégrafos de España, known as Correos, issued a postage stamp corresponding to the series Diarios centenarios, which went on sale on 16 May 2005, designed by Ion Echeveste, which reproduces the image of the Cristo del Otero, the work of Victorio Macho, the city's coat of arms, and a rooster symbolising the salesmen or spokesmen and which forms part of the newspaper's corporate identity.

== Bibliography ==
- Buisán Cítores, Félix (1983). Nacimiento del periodismo palentino a través de "El Crepúsculo" diario fin de siglo (in Spanish). Institución Tello Téllez de Meneses/ Diputación Provincial.
- Checa Godoy, Antonio (1989). Prensa y partidos políticos durante la II República (in Spanish). Universidad de Salamanca. ISBN 84-7481-521-5.
- Casero Ripollés, Andreu (2012). La prensa local ante el reto digital (in Spanish). Castellón: Universidad Jaume I.
- García Galindo, Juan Antonio (2002). La comunicación social durante el franquismo (in Spanish). Diputación Provincial de Málaga.
