= José Luis Rodríguez Zapatero =

Prime Minister of Spain from 2004 to 2011

The Most Excellent José Luis Rodríguez Zapatero
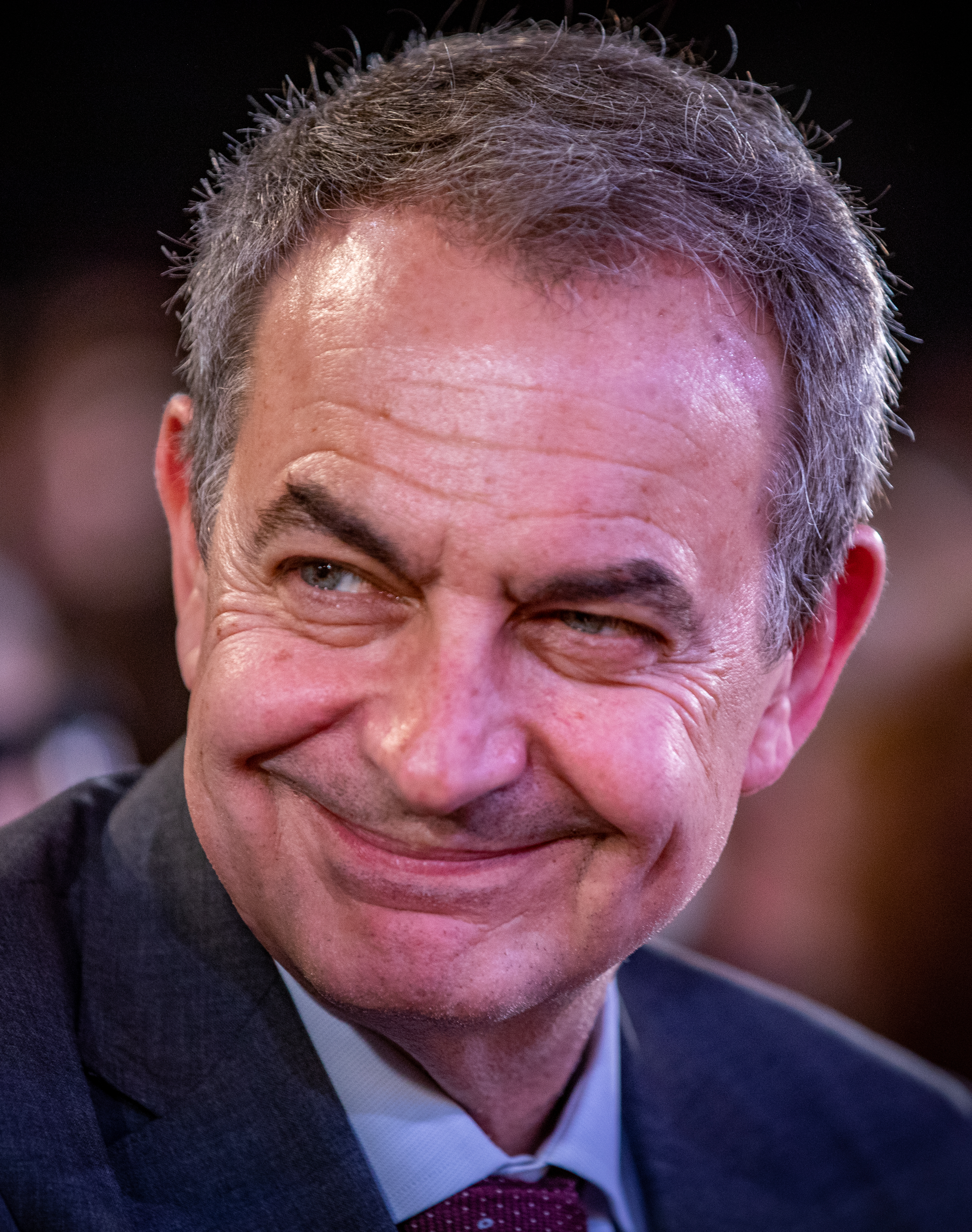
- Rodríguez Zapatero in 2023

Prime Minister of Spain
- In office 17 April 2004 – 21 December 2011
- Monarch: Juan Carlos I
- Deputy: First deputy María Teresa Fernández de la Vega; Alfredo Pérez Rubalcaba; Elena Salgado (Note: Previously served as second deputy prime minister.); Second deputy Pedro Solbes; Elena Salgado; Manuel Chaves (Note: Previously served as third deputy prime minister.)
- Preceded by: José María Aznar
- Succeeded by: Mariano Rajoy

Secretary-General of the Spanish Socialist Workers' Party
- In office 22 July 2000 – 4 February 2012
- President: Manuel Chaves
- Deputy: José Blanco
- Preceded by: Joaquín Almunia
- Succeeded by: Alfredo Pérez Rubalcaba

Leader of the Opposition
- In office 22 July 2000 – 16 April 2004
- Monarch: Juan Carlos I
- Prime Minister: José María Aznar
- Preceded by: Luis Martínez Noval
- Succeeded by: Mariano Rajoy

Member of the Congress of Deputies
- In office 24 March 2004 – 27 September 2011
- Constituency: Madrid
- In office 9 July 1986 – 2 August 2004
- Constituency: León

Personal details
- Born: 4 August 1960 (age 66) Valladolid, Castile and León, Spain
- Party: PSOE (since 1979)
- Spouse: Sonsoles Espinosa (m. 1990)
- Children: 2
- Education: University of León

José Luis Rodríguez Zapatero (Spanish: [xoseˈlwis roˈðɾiɣeθ θapaˈteɾo]; (Note: The Diccionario panhispánico de dudas explicitly states that José Luis is pronounced [joseluís], i.e. IPA: [xoseˈlwis], as can be heard in the audio file.) born 4 August 1960) is a Spanish politician and member of the Spanish Socialist Workers' Party (PSOE). He was the Prime Minister of Spain being elected for two terms, in the 2004 and 2008 general elections. On 2 April 2011 he announced he would not stand for re-election in the 2011 general election and left office on 21 December 2011.

Among the main actions taken by the Zapatero administration were the withdrawal of Spanish troops from the Iraq war, the increase of Spanish troops in Afghanistan; the idea of an Alliance of Civilizations; the legalisation of same-sex marriage in Spain; reform of abortion law; a peace negotiation attempt with ETA; the end of ETA terrorism; increase of tobacco restrictions; and the reform of various autonomous statutes, particularly the Statute of Catalonia.

He became the first former Spanish prime minister to be charged when, on 19 May 2026, the National Court charged him with money laundering and membership of a criminal organisation in connection with an investigation into the alleged laundering of the €53 million public bailout that the second government of Pedro Sánchez provided to the airline Plus Ultra in 2021.

== Biography ==
=== Family background and early life ===
José Luis Rodríguez Zapatero was born in Valladolid, Castile and León, to Juan Rodríguez y García-Lozano (born 1928), a lawyer, and María de la Purificación Zapatero Valero (1927–2000). He grew up in León, where his family originated.

His paternal grandfather, Juan Rodríguez y Lozano (1893–1936), was a captain in the Spanish Republican Army; he was executed by Francisco Franco's Nationalist forces a month into the Spanish Civil War, for refusing to fight with them. His whereabouts were revealed by fascists in Valladolid.

His maternal grandfather, Faustino Valentín Zapatero Ballesteros (1899–1978), was a paediatrician and middle class liberal. His maternal grandmother María de la Natividad Valero y Asensio (1902–2006) was a conservative and died at age 103. Zapatero was born in Valladolid not only because of his mother's attachment to her family, who lived there, but also because of the medical profession of her father.

Zapatero has said that, as a youngster, "as I remember it, I used to participate in late night conversations with my father and brother about politics, law or literature". However, he did not get along very well with his father at times. Sources say that his father refused to let him work or take any part in his law firm, and this scarred him for life. He says that his family taught him to be tolerant, thoughtful, prudent and austere.

The memory of Zapatero's grandfather was also kept alive by a last will, handwritten 24 hours before facing the firing squad, and which can be considered a final declaration of principles. The will comprised six parts, the first three bestowing his possessions on his heirs; the fourth, in which he asked for a civil burial and, the fifth, in which he requested his family to forgive those who had tried and executed him and proclaiming his belief in the Supreme Being. In the sixth, Zapatero's grandfather asked his family to clear his name in the future as his creed consisted only in his "love for peace, for good and for improving the living conditions of the lower classes".

According to an Israeli newspaper, Maariv, by Zapatero's own statement: "My family, named Zapatero, is of Jewish descent", probably from a family of Marranos. He is an agnostic.

He studied law at the University of León, graduating in 1982. His performance as a student was above average before his pre-University year. According to his brother Juan: "He didn't study much but it made no difference, he continued successfully".

After graduating, Zapatero worked as a teaching assistant in constitutional law at the University of León until 1986 (he continued working some hours a week without pay until 1991). It was subsequently found that he had been appointed by his department without the usual selection process involving interviews and competitive examinations, which if true, constitutes a case of political favouritism. He has declared that the only activity that attracts him besides politics is teaching or, at most, academic research.

Rodríguez Zapatero met Sonsoles Espinosa in León in 1981. They married on 27 January 1990 and have two daughters named Laura (b. 1993) and Alba (b. 1995).

Having received successive deferments because of his conditions as a university student and a teaching assistant, Zapatero did not fulfill the compulsory military service. As an MP he was finally exempted.

=== Entering politics ===
Zapatero attended his first political rally, organized by the Spanish Socialist Workers' Party (PSOE) in Gijón in 1976. Some political parties had been legal since 21 July 1976, but the PSOE was not legalized until February 1977. The speech of Felipe González, the PSOE leader and future Prime Minister of Spain, who took part in the rally, exerted an important influence on Zapatero. He said, among other things, that "the Socialists' goal was the seizure of power by the working class to transform the ownership of the means of production" and that "the PSOE was a revolutionary party but not revolutionarist or aventurist [...], as it defended the use of elections to come to power". Zapatero and his family had been traditionally attracted to the Communist Party as it was the only party really organized before Francisco Franco's death in 1975. But, after the famous political rally in Gijón, they, and especially Zapatero, started to believe that the Socialist Party was the most probable future for the Spanish left. At that time the Socialist Party was rebuilding its infrastructure in the province of León after having been outlawed following the Spanish Civil War.

In 1977, the year of the first democratic elections after Franco's death, Zapatero supported both the Communist and Socialist parties. He pasted posters of both parties.

He eventually joined the PSOE on 23 February 1979. The impression Felipe González had caused on him in 1976 played a fundamental role in his decision to join the party. In 1979, during the Congreso Extraordinario del PSOE (1979), the PSOE had renounced Marxism as its ideological base. He said nothing about joining the party at home, because he was afraid his parents would discourage him, considering him too young to join a political party.

In 1982, Zapatero became head of the socialist youth organization in the province of León. In July 1982, he met Felipe González at the summer school "Jaime Vera" and suggested that he make a "left turn" in the PSOE political program for the General Election of October 1982. González answered advising him to abandon his conservative (traditional for PSOE [leftist]) viewpoint.

=== Member of the Congress of Deputies ===
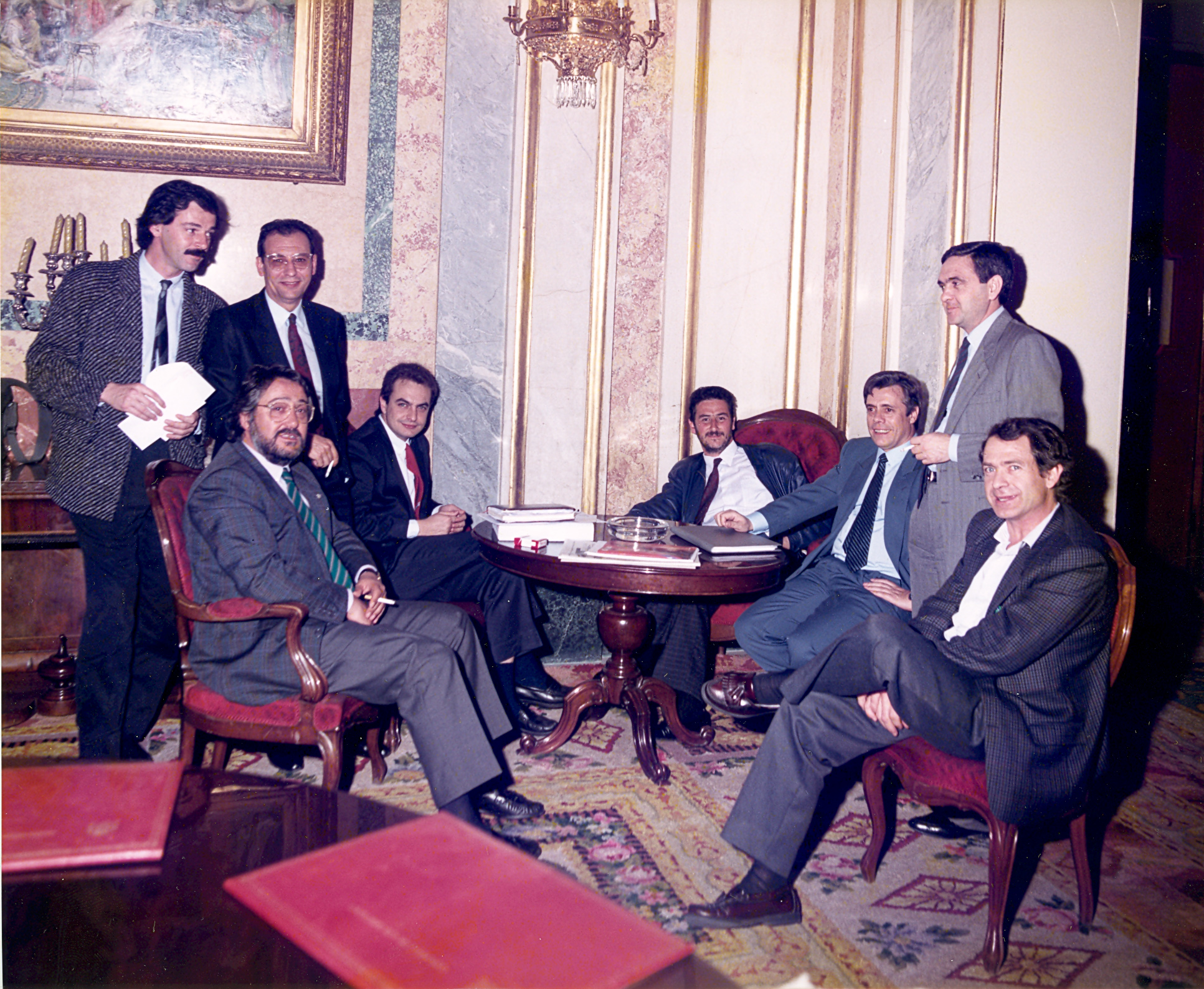
Zapatero having a break during a parliamentary session with some fellow PSOE MPs in 1988.

In 1986, he was elected to represent the province of León in the Cortes (Parliament), becoming its youngest member after the election held on 20 June. He was number two on the PSOE list for León. In the following elections (those held in 1989, 1993, 1996 and 2000) he was number one on the list. In the elections of 2004 he ran for Madrid as number one.

Zapatero defined himself as a "left-wing conservative" at the time. He explained that he meant that, for sentimental reasons linked to his family, he came from the left that lost the Spanish Civil War and that what had happened between 1936 and 1939 (the duration of the war) and 1939–1975 (Franco's regime) had a very important significance for him. He further explained that the Spanish left needed to modernize and that "we are finding it difficult to accept the need for the Socialist Party to change many of its ideological parameters and overcome our own conservatism".

In 1988 he became Secretary General in León after a complex internal fight for power that ended a long period of division. In fact, before the provincial conference held that year, Ramón Rubial, then national president of the PSOE, had asked the party in León to foster unity. Zapatero was elected as Secretary General at that conference, leading to a period of stability.

In the 1980s and 1990s, the PSOE consisted of two factions: the Guerristas (supporters of Alfonso Guerra, former vice-president under Felipe González) and the reformers (led by Felipe González). The first group had a stronger left-wing ideology whereas the second was more pragmatic. The division became wider after the General Election of 1993, the last election won by the PSOE before José María Aznar's victory in 1996, when the bad results exacerbated the internal conflicts. Zapatero never formally joined either of those two groups.

In 1993, the Socialist Federation of León (FSL – Federación Socialista de León) suffered an important scandal. Some towns experienced unusually sharp increases in PSOE membership in a very short period of time. When some of the supposed new members were questioned by the press, they stated that they were unaware of their membership and that they did not live in the places where they were being registered by the party. It seems that some opponents of Zapatero in León, perhaps with the support of powerful Guerristas at the top of the Spanish Socialist Party wanted to increase their influence within it by increasing the number of members in the towns of León favorable to them. Their main aim would have been to take control of the Regional Socialist Section of Castilla y León in the conference to be held in 1994. Zapatero's support for the then Regional Secretary General, Jesús Quijano transformed him into the enemy of the Guerristas in the region as the FSL is the most important Provincial Section.

In May 1994 two papers, El País and Diario de León, published several articles that suggested irregularities in his appointment as a teaching assistant by the University of León and in his keeping the job until 1991. The suspicions of political favoritism were due to his having been directly appointed without a prior selection process open to other candidates. On 20 May 1994, he held a press conference where he rejected these accusations. Zapatero attributed to "ignorance" or "bad faith" the content of the articles and linked them to the internal fight for the job of Secretary General of the Regional Chapter.

In 1994, three regional conferences were held: All of them were finally won by Zapatero or his supporters.

The National Conference (held after most of the representatives elected in the first León Conference were Zapatero's supporters) was won by the reformers, at that time strongly opposed to the Guerristas. That was positive for Zapatero as the list of bogus party members was revised again. Their number grew from 577 to almost 900.

Zapatero was finally reelected secretary general with 68% of the ballots in the 7th Regional Conference held in July 1994, following the removal of the false memberships.

In 1995, new regional and local elections were held. The results were bad for the PSOE in León as they lost four seats in the mayoralty of León and two seats in the regional parliament of Castilla-León. The results were influenced by the bad economic situation and the cases of corruption assailing the party. Zapatero had personally directed the electoral campaign.

In 1996, after the General Election, Zapatero kept his seat at the Congress of Deputies. The following year, Zapatero was again elected Secretary General of León and after the national conference held by the party that year he entered the National Executive (the party's governing body).

The Association of Parliamentary Journalists awarded to Zapatero the "Diputado Revelación" prize (something like Most promising MP of the year) in December 1999 for his activities as a member of the Congress of Deputies. From 1996 until 2000, his most conspicuous contributions as an MP were his vigorous opposition to the electrical protocol proposed by the government (initially negative for the important coal sector of León), being the PSOE spokesman in the Commission of Public Administration and probably his most important success as an MP: the passing of an amendment to the national budget of 2000 in November 1999 that increased the pensions of the non-professional soldiers who fought for the Republic during the Spanish Civil War of 1936–1939. They were made equal to those of the professional military. The initiative was defended by him in the name of the Parliamentary Socialist Group, proponent of the amendment.

=== Bid for PSOE leadership ===
On 12 March 2000, the PSOE had lost its second successive election to José María Aznar's People's Party. Zapatero held his seat, but the Socialist Party obtained only 125 seats, 16 fewer than in 1996. The defeat was especially bitter as the People's Party unexpectedly obtained an absolute majority for the first time and the socialist result was worse than in the previous election. Almunia announced his resignation on the very day the General Election took place.

Zapatero decided to run for the leadership of the Socialist Party in its 35th Conference to be held in June that year. Together with other socialist members, he founded a new faction within the party called Nueva Vía (New Way) in April 2000, to serve him as a platform to become Secretary General. The name of Nueva Vía was a mix of Tony Blair's Third Way (tercera vía in Spanish) and Gerhard Schröder's Neue Mitte (new center or nuevo centro in Spanish).

On 25 June 2000 Zapatero officially announced his intention to run for the federal Secretaryship General at an Extraordinary Conference of the Socialist Party of León. (Note: In his speech, he stated what can be considered his declaration of principles: 1. To build a society that would accept all foreigners notwithstanding their color or cultural background.; 2. To give priority to education and to create good jobs for youngsters.; 3. To provide parents with more time to spend with their children and in taking care of their elders.; 4. To promote culture and its creators, making it possible for them to grab the spotlight from those aiming only at economic interests.; 5. To convert Spain into a country admired for helping those with more needs.; 6. To force the government to help those with initiative and enterprising qualities.; 7. To foster democracy, to lend distinction to politics and to promote values over temporary interests.)

Pasqual Maragall was the only regional leader of the Socialist Party who officially supported him before the Conference was held. Josep Borrell also decided to support him.

Zapatero ran against three other opponents (José Bono, Rosa Díez and Matilde Fernández). Matilde Fernández was the candidate of the guerristas while José Bono was the candidate of the reformers. Rosa Díez was a Basque politician who was a kind of intermediate option at the time.

Zapatero was a dark horse who had against him his inexperience and in favour his image of reform and being the only MP among the candidates. (All the Spanish opposition leaders had been MPs before winning the elections. A very important factor in Spanish politics where electoral campaigns last for only 15 days and to be widely known long before they begin is essential.) Bono was deeply disliked by the guerristas, who also favoured Zapatero.

Zapatero finally won by a relatively small margin (he obtained 414 votes out of 995 and José Bono obtained 405) on 22 July 2000. The margin was relatively small because Bono had no likelihood of winning since the supporters of the other two candidates preferred Zapatero as their second choice. Zapatero accepted the cancellation of a run-off between himself and Bono because he was sure of his victory after only one ballot and he apparently did not want to humiliate his adversary.

After becoming Secretary General, he was congratulated by the French PM Lionel Jospin, by the German Chancellor Gerhard Schröder and by José María Aznar.

He moved to Madrid with his family that year. As a Congressman he had lived from Monday to Thursday in Madrid and the rest of the time in León.

=== Opposition leader ===
This was the period when Zapatero was appointed as Secretary General of the PSOE in 2000 until he became Prime Minister of Spain on 14 April 2004.

Zapatero has always claimed to base his political activity on his love of dialogue. When he was an opposition leader, he liked to contrast his behaviour with the "arrogant", "authoritarian" approach of the People's Party and, especially, that of its leader José María Aznar.

As a result, after being appointed Secretary General, he coined the term Calm Opposition (Oposición Tranquila) to refer to his opposition strategy. The Calm Opposition was supposedly based on an "open to dialogue", "soft", "constructive" attitude (talante constructivo, coined as talante) aimed not at damaging the government but at achieving the "best" for the people. (Zapatero has insisted on this point so many times that the term talante has become very popular in Spain.) Because of this supposed tactic, Zapatero received nicknames like Bambi or Sosoman (where Soso, meaning "dull, insipid, bore", replaces Super in Superman), especially in the first months after being appointed General Secretary.

After his election to the leadership of the PSOE, Zapatero spoke about the influence of the political philosophy of civic republicanism on him in general, and in particular the ideas of republican political philosopher Philip Pettit. In an interview with El Mundo, Zapatero linked civic republicanism's focus on civic virtue to tolerance of individual autonomy and expanding political participation.

During Zapatero's years as an opposition leader (and later as prime minister), the tension between left-wing and right-wing supporters increased and, according to some opinions, a real radicalization of the society took (and is taking) place. Zapatero's supporters blame his opponents for that and the People's Party blames him stating facts such as the increase in the acts of violence committed against them, especially in the months before and during the war in Iraq. As a result, a new term has become popular: guerracivilismo (made up of a combination of the Spanish for Civil War and the -ismo suffix, equivalent to the English "-ism"), which would refer to the growing enmity of right and left-wing factions.

Zapatero's criticisms of the government were very active from the beginning, blaming the government for its inability to control the rise in the price of fossil fuel and asking for a reduction in the corresponding taxes.

In 2000, the British nuclear submarine HMS Tireless arrived at Gibraltar harbour to have its nuclear reactor repaired. Aznar affirmed that there was no risk for the population but Zapatero criticized him for his inability to force the British government to take the submarine to another harbour. After almost one year, the Tireless was repaired and left Gibraltar without having caused any known problems.

Another point of friction came from the scheme to transfer water from the River Ebro to other areas, especially the irrigated areas in the South East of Spain, one of the richest agricultural regions in the world. The scheme had received support from, among others, 80% of the affected farmers and the Socialist regional governments of regions such as Extremadura, Andalusia or Castilla-La Mancha. Some Socialist politicians also supported it when they were members of the former Socialist government back in the 90s (e.g. José Borrell, the current leader of the European Spanish Socialist Group and former president of the European Parliament. The scheme was mainly opposed by Zapatero, environmentalist groups, the Socialist regional government of Aragon and some of the citizens of the areas from which water was to be transferred. The main criticisms of the scheme were the supposed damage to the environment and an argued real lack of sufficient water for all of the affected parties (the proponents of the scheme answered back that there was no risk of a serious environmental damage and that in 2003, 14 times more water reached the sea than what was needed annually). The scheme, finally approved by the Government, was canceled by Zapatero soon after becoming prime minister.

Zapatero was the main proponent of the "Pacto de las Libertades contra el Terrorismo" ("Anti Terrorist Freedom pact) which was signed on 8 December 2000.

At the end of the year, the Mad Cow disease came back into the spotlight after its outbreak in 1996. Zapatero repeatedly criticized the Government's management of the crisis arguing that it was out of control. As of March 2005, the disease had caused dozens of deaths all over Europe, though none in Spain.

In 2001 one of the biggest points of friction between the government and the opposition were the proposed reforms affecting the education system. The People's Party first introduced the so-called LOU, a law to change the university system, and later the LOCE (Organic Act for Education Quality), which affected secondary education. Zapatero strongly opposed both. The People's Party used its absolute majority in the Cortes to pass its reforms.

A regional election was held in the Basque Country on 13 May 2001. The socialists received 17.8% of the vote (against 17.6% in the previous 1998 elections) but lost one seat. Both, the Socialist Party and the People's Party had formed an alliance against the then ruling nationalist Basque political movements but the latter won again. The results were considered a failure. Nicolás Redondo Terreros, the Basque Socialist leader during the election who was strongly opposed to Basque nationalism and to ETA, resigned after some internal clashes, resigning his seat in the Basque parliament and in the Federal Executive. He was replaced by Patxi López, elected on 24 March 2002. López had actively supported Zapatero during his campaign to become Secretary General.

On 21 October 2001 a new regional election took place, this time in Galicia. The People's Party, led in Galicia by Manuel Fraga Iribarne, obtained a new absolute majority. The Socialist party increased its number of seats from 15 to 17, but, after several years of opposition the results were also considered bad. These two negative results seemed to confirm that Zapatero's approach was not working.

On 19 December 2001 Zapatero travelled to Morocco, after the Moroccan government expelled the Spanish ambassador sine die. Javier Arenas, then secretary general of the People's Party, accused him of not being loyal to Spanish interests. Zapatero denied it and claimed that one of his purposes was to help solve the crisis.

In 2002, Zapatero was chosen as the Socialist candidate for the next general election.

In 2002, the People's Party Government decided to reform the system of unemployment benefits, as it thought that there were too many workers who being able to find a job preferred to continue receiving public money. This led to a redefinition of those who were eligible for unemployment benefits. Left-wing parties and trade unions considered that redefinition an unacceptable reduction of rights. Zapatero became the political leader of the opposition against the reform (dubbed the Decretazo, because it was passed using a decree-law), which served him as his first important clash with Aznar's government.

A General Strike was announced for 20 June 2002 (the first since Aznar won the election in 1996). Although, according to official data (including the electrical power consumption and the number of working days calculated by the Social Security), the turnout was lower than 15%, the lowest since the restoration of democracy, neither the unions nor Zapatero believed the data and considered the strike a resounding success, with more than "10 million" workers having followed the strike. Whatever the result, both the People's Party government and the trade unions signed an agreement that satisfied both parties in November.

In May 2002, Felipe González declared in reference to the change in the Socialist Party that "My state of mind tells me that a change has taken place, that perhaps a second Suresnes has happened, but it has yet to be proved that a new project with content and ideas really exists", thus doubting Zapatero's leadership. That declaration was expressed in a public event also attended by Zapatero, who calmly expressed his disagreement. González ended his intervention by remembering that his candidate for Secretary General was José Bono, not Zapatero. González backtracked the next day, declaring that either his words had been incorrectly construed or he had expressed his ideas erroneously. José Bono himself confirmed his total support for Zapatero. The incident seemed to confirm that Zapatero's strategy was not working.

On 22 October 2002 Zapatero spoke in the name of the Socialist Party during the debate about the National Budget. Initially, Jordi Sevilla was to have been the Socialist spokesman but, at the last moment, he was replaced in a surprise move. When Jordi Sevilla, after being called by the speaker, had already descended to the floor of the Congress of Deputies, Zapatero said to him "let me do it" and climbed to the orator platform. José María Aznar and other members of the People's Party had previously criticized him for not representing his party in the debate, suggesting a lack of the necessary political skills. Although the People's Party considered his action too theatrical, it seems it had quite a positive effect on his supporters.

In November 2002, the oil tanker Prestige suffered an accident in international waters off the coast of Galicia causing a grave oil slick which mainly affected Galicia, but also, to a lesser degree all the northern coast of Spain, and even the coast of France. The Prestige finally split and sank.

Zapatero blamed the Government's handling of the events during and after the accident.

The main point of friction between Aznar and Zapatero, however, was the war in Iraq. Opinion polls showed that a clear majority of Spanish voters (around 90%) were against the U.S.-led attack against Saddam Hussein's regime. Among them, Zapatero who considered any action against Saddam's regime to be illegal and was opposed to the very concept of preemptive war.

On 26 May 2003 a Yakovlev Yak-42 plane carrying Spanish soldiers home from Afghanistan crashed in Turkey. The plane had been hired by an agency of NATO. Zapatero blamed Aznar and his government for neglecting aspects like the plane insurance or safety. Further, Aznar had rejected calls for a full inquiry into the crash. After the 2004 March elections it was proven that there had been serious irregularities in the identification of the corpses resulting in a high number of mistakes.

Concerning the European Constitution, Zapatero criticized the People's Party Government for fighting to preserve the distribution of power agreed by the 2001 Treaty of Nice in the new Constitution. Zapatero thought that Spain should accept a lesser share of power.

On 25 May 2003, the first local and regional elections since Zapatero's appointment as leader of the Socialist party were held. The Socialist Party received a larger popular vote (which prompted Zapatero to claim his party had been the winner) but the People's Party obtained more posts in councils and regional governments. In general, there were not many changes in the results compared to those of the previous Elections held in 1999. The Socialists lost the Balearic Islands but got enough votes in Madrid to govern through a coalition with the communists of the United Left. The "victory" was welcomed by Zapatero, as the winner in Madrid had always won the next general election. However, an unexpected scandal, the so-called Madrid Assembly Scandal, negatively affected the socialist expectations of a victory in 2004.

After the Madrid election, the People's Party lacked two seats to obtain an absolute majority. This seemed to allow an alliance of Socialists and the United Left to seize power. But an unexpected event happened. Eduardo Tamayo and María Teresa Sáez, two Socialist Assembly Members (AMs) angry at the distribution of power in the future regional government between the United Left and the Socialist Party, started a crisis that led to a re-run of the Election in Madrid in October 2003 with the subsequent victory of the People's Party.

Zapatero did not accept the account of the Socialist AMs and tried to explain it as a conspiratorial plot caused by speculative interests of the house building industry that would have bribed the AMs to prevent a left-wing government. The People's Party, on the other hand, defended the theory that the anger of the two Socialist AMs was caused by Zapatero's broken promise about the referred distribution of power within the Madrid section of the Socialist Party. That promise would have been made some months before the crisis in exchange of support for one of his more immediate collaborators (Trinidad Jiménez), who wanted to become the Socialist candidate for mayor of Madrid (the Spanish capital).

Zapatero's team had entered into contact with José Luis Balbás through Enrique Martínez and Jesús Caldera (then Minister of Labor) In April 2000, Zapatero, Caldera and José Blanco had had lunch with Eduardo Tamayo in a restaurant in Madrid. Tamayo would later become a representative of Zapatero in the 35th party national conference. At the end of the month "Renovadores de la Base" (the faction of Tamayo and Balbás) decided to support Zapatero and the later agreed to be part of Zapatero's team. He played an important role during Zapatero's promotion. For example, Balbás together with José Blanco controlled the list of delegates.

During the Debate over the State of the Nation, an annual debate that takes place in the Spanish Congress of Deputies, Zapatero was harshly criticised by José María Aznar on account of the scandal. For the first time, the opinion polls showed that most Spaniards believed that the then Spanish Prime Minister had been the winner (Zapatero had always been considered the winner since his first debate in 2001).

Later, in October, a regional election took place in Catalonia, whose results were worse than expected for the Socialist Party. As most of the Autonomous communities of Spain hold the elections to their assemblies the same day, with the exception of Andalusia, Catalonia, Galicia and the Basque Country, coinciding with the municipal elections all over Spain, the results are hugely significant.

On 16 November 2003, the regional election for the Assembly of Catalonia was held. Two days before, Zapatero had predicted a historic victory for the Socialists' Party of Catalonia and the beginning of the People's Party defeat. The Socialist Party won the election in popular vote but CiU obtained more MPs due to the electoral law. The final results were 46 seats for Convergence and Union (CiU) (ten fewer than in 1999, the year of the previous election), 42 for the Socialist Party (ten fewer), 15 for the People's Party (three more), 9 for Iniciativa per Catalunya-Verds and 23 (nine more) for the Republican Left of Catalonia. Zapatero attributed the bad results to the consequences of the crisis of Madrid. However, Maragall became the President of the Regional Government after a Pact with Republican Left of Catalonia and Iniciativa per Catalunya-Verds.

That alliance resulted in another setback for the Socialist Party when the Spanish newspaper ABC published an article stating that Josep-Lluís Carod-Rovira, leader of Republican Left of Catalonia, had met some ETA members secretly in January 2004. According to ABC, Carod-Rovira had promised to provide ETA with political support if the group did not act in Catalonia, which seemed to have been confirmed by the ETA announcement of a truce affecting only that region some months later, before the general election of 2004. Carod-Rovira resigned as vice president of the Catalan government, but continued to be the leader of his party. The scandal damaged Zapatero's image, as ETA and political violence are controversial issues in Spain and Carod-Rovira's party was seen as a possible ally if Zapatero won the election.

At end of 2003 and the beginning of 2004 the Spanish political parties started to prepare themselves for the general election of 2004. All of the opinion polls elaborated at the time foreseen a defeat for Zapatero, as they always predicted a new victory for the People's Party.

=== The 2004 general election ===
The campaign for the General Election started a fortnight before 14 March 2004. Polls favoured the People's Party, with some polls predicting a possible repeat of their absolute majority.

Previously, on 8 January 2004, Zapatero had created a Committee of Notables composed of 10 highly qualified experts with considerable political weight. Its mission was to help him to become prime minister. Among its members: José Bono (his ex-rival for the Secretaryship of the party and later appointed Minister of Defence), Juan Carlos Rodríguez Ibarra (president of the regional government of Extremadura and one of the most important socialist leaders), Miguel Ángel Moratinos (his minister of foreign affairs 2004–2010), Gregorio Peces-Barba (later appointed by him High Commissioner for the Victims of Terrorism, although he has already made public his resignation), Carmen Calvo (later appointed minister of culture), etc.

Ten days later, on 18 January 2004, Zapatero announced that he would only become prime minister if the Spanish Socialist Workers Party received a plurality, renouncing possible parliamentary alliances in advance if that situation did not happen after the election. Minority parties (especially United Left, a communist party) criticized the decision, for they considered it an attempt to attract their own voters, who would rather ensure a defeat of the People's Party even at the expense of voting for an unfavorable party.

Zapatero's slogan became "we deserve a better Spain", which was coupled with "Zapatero Presidente", or "(ZP)", which became a popular nickname of the then Spanish Prime Minister.

Campaign promises

- 180,000 new houses every year to buy or to rent
- Preservation of a balanced budget with no deficit but with a more flexible approach than that of the People's Party
- Bilingual education (English and Spanish, together with the official regional language in the areas where it existed)
- A computer for every two students
- A two-year maximum for legal processes or financial compensation
- Further investment in research and development
- Make the state-owned television company more independent from the government by making its director answerable to parliament, etc.).

During the campaign, Zapatero harshly criticized the People's Party for its management of the Prestige crisis, its attitude towards the invasion of Iraq and the high cost of housing. Mariano Rajoy, the new leader of the People's Party after Aznar's voluntary retirement, on his part, attacked Zapatero's foreseeable future alliances with parties like United Left or Republican Left of Catalonia (a pro-Independence Catalan party).

One of the most important points of friction was the absence of televised debates between the candidates. Zapatero was the first to propose a debate to Mariano Rajoy. Rajoy accepted on the condition that Zapatero could not be alone but accompanied at least by two of his potential allies after the election: Gaspar Llamazares (the leader of United Left) and Josep-Lluís Carod-Rovira (leader of Republican Left of Catalonia). Rajoy justified his decision on the grounds that, in his opinion, he was not running against the Socialist Party but against a "coalition" of forces opposed to the People's Party's policies. Zapatero never formally responded to this proposal and throughout the campaign he continued criticizing what he always defined as Rajoy's reluctance to defend his political program face-to-face. (Zapatero has promised to change electoral law to make televised debates compulsory.)

On 11 March 2004 the most deadly peacetime attacks in Spanish history took place. Several commuter trains were bombed, causing 191 deaths and outrage all over Spain. The attacks took place three days before the General Election and all electoral activities were suspended. The common sorrow, instead of promoting unity among Spaniards, increased the already bitter tone of the campaign.

The People's Party government and Zapatero (who accused ETA in a radio statement broadcast at 8:50 am), initially claimed the attacks to be the work of ETA, an armed Basque nationalist separatist organization. Later, after an audiotape in Arabic was found in a van near a railway station where the perpetrators boarded one of the trains, Aznar declared that all of the possibilities were being investigated. The government was accused of manipulating information about who was responsible for the attacks to avoid the consequences of public anger at a bombing motivated by its foreign policy – Aznar personally phoned the editors of the four national daily newspapers to tell them that ETA were responsible, whilst Minister of the Interior Ángel Acebes attacked those who believed that responsibility lay elsewhere, despite not offering any evidence for ETA's culpability, and the state broadcaster TVE initially failed to report the protest outside the Popular Party's headquarters which ran through the night before the day of the election.

Zapatero himself has repeatedly accused the Popular Party of lying about those who were responsible for the attacks. On the other hand, the book 11-M. La venganza by Casimiro Abadillo, a Spanish journalist who works for the newspaper El Mundo, claims that, before the General Election, Zapatero had told that newspaper's director, Pedro J. Ramirez, that two suicide bombers had been found among the victims (although the specialists that examined the bodies said they found no such evidence). When he was asked in December 2004 about the issue by the Parliamentary Investigative Committee created to find the truth about the attacks, he declared that he did not remember what he had said.

The campaign had ended abruptly two days before it was expected to convene as a result of the bombings. The day before the elections – in this case 13 March 2004 – is considered to be a "Day of Reflection" under Spanish electoral law, with candidates and their parties legally barred from political campaigning. Despite this prohibition, numerous demonstrations took place against the government of José María Aznar in front of the premises of the People's Party all over Spain. There were some claims that most of these demonstrations were instigated or orchestrated by the Socialist Party, through the use of SMS text messaging from mobile phones belonging to the Socialist Party. The Socialist Party publicly denied these accusations.

As the demonstrations escalated, Mariano Rajoy himself appeared on national TV to denounce the illegal demonstrations. In reply, both José Blanco and Alfredo Pérez Rubalcaba broke the silence from the Socialist Party's side, in separate appearances. In the end both sides accused each other of breaking the electoral law on reflection day.

In this climate of social unrest and post-attack shock, the elections were held on 14 March 2004. Zapatero's Socialist Party won the elections, with 164 seats in the Cortes, while the People's Party obtained 148. It seems likely that the election result was influenced to a greater or lesser extent by the Spanish public's response to the attacks and the informative coverage by the different media and political parties. He took office on 17 April.

An important point of controversy is if the purpose of the Madrid attacks were to force a Socialist victory; at issue as well was that, if that was the case, whether they succeeded in altering the final result. This has been called the "4 March theory" (that is, if the election had been scheduled for 7 March, the attacks would have taken place on 4 March) by Aznar, among others. No definitive data exists in favour of that possibility but some facts have been used to support it. Thus, the first question Jamal Zougam (one of the first arrested suspects) made when he arrived at the Courthouse on 15 March 2004 was: 'Who won the election?'.

How the bombing influenced the results is widely debated. The three schools of thought are:

- The attacks themselves might have changed the electoral winner. A sufficient number of voters suddenly decided to vote for the Socialist party because they thought that if it won, Islamist terrorism would be placated.
- The handling of the attacks by the government, rather than the attacks themselves, might have changed the electoral winner. People who had the perception that the information about the attacks was being manipulated decided to vote the Socialist party as a response.
- The attacks might have changed the result but not the winner. The Socialist Party was going to win but with fewer votes. (Despite this claim, most polls before the attacks gave a victory to Mariano Rajoy.)

The theory that the bombing affected the result is a counterfactual that cannot be verified. As elections in European states hinge on social and economic policies mainly, it is equally possible the terrorist events had no notable effect. In this regard, a majority of 74% of the Spanish people were against Spanish involvement in the war.

On 13 June 2004 (three months after the General Election) the Election for the European Parliament took place. The Socialist Party tied with 25 seats vs 25 for the People's Party (out of 54), but narrowly won in popular vote. Although José Borrell was the official candidate, Zapatero played an important role in that campaign (as is usual in Spain).

== Premiership ==
Styles of José Luis Rodríguez Zapatero
- Reference style: Excelentísimo Señor (Don)
- Spoken style: Señor Presidente
- Alternative style: Señor Zapatero, Don José Luis

His style's defining word is (buen) talante, roughly "pleasantness", "niceness" or "good disposition", which is in brisk and carefully chosen contrast with the more confrontational and brusque premiership style of previous Prime Minister José María Aznar. Similarly, Zapatero has been quoted to shy away from adopting unpopular measures, having a "habit of showering public money on any problem" and, in all, being "averse to tough decisions".

=== Withdrawal from Iraq ===
One of the first measures he carried out as soon as he took office was to withdraw every Spanish soldier fighting in Iraq, calling the invasion of that country "an error based on lies". In less than a month, his nation's 1,300 troops were withdrawn from Iraq. This drew criticism from the right, who held the view that he was ceding to the pressure of the terrorists who attacked Spain. However, it was a measure announced by him before the general elections and supported by the majority of Spanish population.

=== Domestic policy ===
Much of Zapatero's work has been on social issues, including gender-motivated violence and discrimination, divorce and same-sex marriage. The most recent social issue tackled has been the Dependency Law, a plan to regulate help and resources for people in dire need of them, and who cannot provide for themselves and must rely on others on a daily basis. Zapatero has also made it clear that he values funding of research and development and higher education and believes them to be essential for Spain's economic competitiveness. At the same time, he increased the minimum wage and pursued other socialist policies.

=== Economic problems ===
Facing a recession and rising unemployment, Zapatero pledged to cut government spending by 4.5% and raise taxes, but not income taxes. The Popular Party contended that Zapatero lacked a coherent economic plan and stated "There is no tax increase capable of filling the hole that you have created". On 23 June 2008 Zapatero announced 21 reforms designed to aid economic recovery in a speech pointedly avoiding popular terms of the period such as 'crisis'. Although government deficits were projected to increase to 10% of GDP, Zapatero promised to reduce it to 3% required by EU policy by 2012.

In January 2011 Spain's Unemployment Rate had risen to 20.33% exceeding his target rate of 19.4%.

=== LGBT rights ===
The legalization of same-sex marriage in Spain on 1 July 2005 includes adoption rights, as well as other rights that were previously only available to heterosexual couples. This caused a stir within the Catholic Church, which opposed the measures and supported a demonstration attended by some 166,000 (according to official figures) and one million people (according to the organisers) in Madrid.

In 2007, Zapatero's government was also responsible for a Gender Identity Law that allowed transgender persons the right to have their identity legally recognised, the criteria being one clinical evaluation and two years of treatment (generally hormone replacement therapy), without the need for mandatory genital surgery or irreversible sterility. The law was, along with the legislation of some US states, one of the most simple and non-bureaucratic in the world. Transgender persons also have the right to marry persons of the opposite or same sex they have transitioned into, and to biologically parent children either before or after transitioning.

=== Regional territorial tensions ===
Zapatero has often declared that his government will not be "soft on terrorism", and will not allow regional nationalists to endanger Spanish unity.

On 13 November 2003, in a rally in Barcelona during the election campaign that took Pasqual Maragall to power in the Generalitat, Rodríguez Zapatero gave a famous promise to approve the Statute of Catalonia:

I will support the reform of the Statute of Catalonia that the Parliament of Catalonia approves.

In October 2005, a controversial proposal to reform the Catalan statute arrived at the Spanish parliament after being passed in Catalonia. Zapatero, who had often expressed his support for a change of the statute (although he did not entirely support the draft passed by the Catalan Parliament), supported the reform.

=== Legacy of the Civil War and Francoism ===
In October 2004, Zapatero's government undertook the task of morally and legally rehabilitating those who were suppressed during and after the Spanish Civil War, by instituting a Memorial Commission chaired by Vice-Prime Minister María Teresa Fernández de la Vega.

On 17 March 2005, Zapatero's government ordered the removal of the last remaining statue of former dictator Francisco Franco that remained in Madrid.

The measures taken have been criticized as an over-correction by the opposition arguing that the Historical Memory Law of 2007 reopens old wounds and has been taken advantage of by certain groups to present a unilateral version of the war which focuses solely on the crimes of one side whilst widely ignoring those of the other.

=== Reform of the education system ===
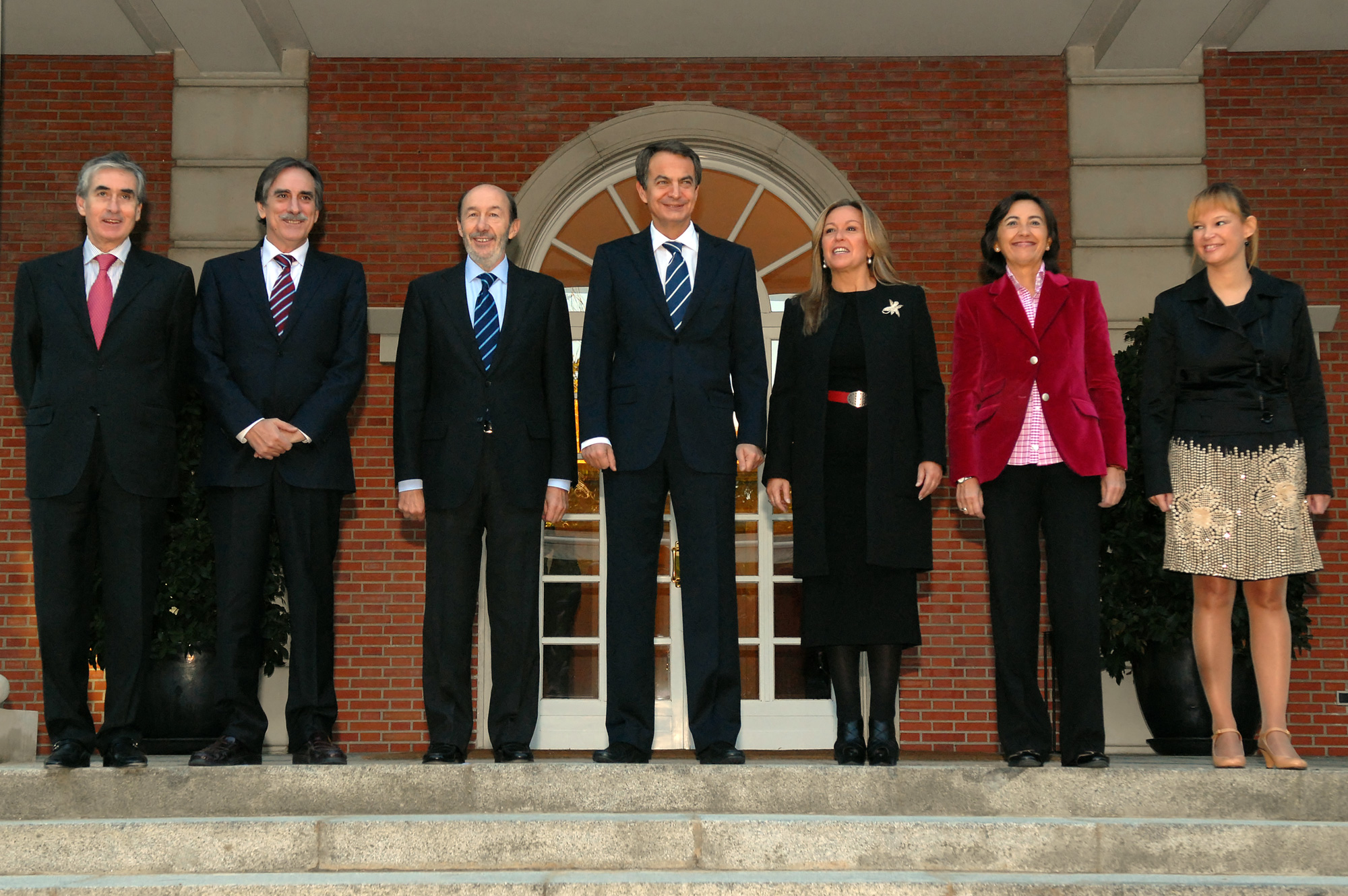
Zapatero along with some of the Government, 2011.

Just after he took office, Zapatero repealed the law reforming the Education System passed by the previous government and, in November 2005, introduced his own reform bill. The bill was opposed by the People's Party, the Catholic Church, the Muslim community, The Catholic Confederation of Parents' Associations and an important part of the educational community, often for disparate reasons. Complaints against the reform include the limits it imposes upon parents' freedom to choose a school, the decrease in academic status of voluntary religious education, the introduction of a compulsory course ("Education for Citizenship") and a perceived ineffectiveness of the reform in terms of combating poor educational results. The last complaint would be reinforced by the opinion that Spain has ranked poorly amongst the developed countries in the quality and results of its education.

After a major demonstration took place against this education reform, the government held a series of meetings with many of the organizations that opposed the reform, reaching agreements with some of them (especially parents' associations and teachers' unions). Some others, most prominently the People's Party and the Catholic Church remain staunchly opposed to it.

=== ETA ===
ETA declared what it described at the time as a "permanent ceasefire" that began on midnight 23 March 2006. On 5 June 2007, ETA declared this ceasefire over. After the initial ceasefire declaration, he informed the Congress that steps would be taken to negotiate with them in order to end its terrorist campaign while denying that there would be any political price paid to put an end to ETA. The PP grew concerned about the possibility of political concessions being made to the group to stop their ways, and actively opposed anything other than the possibility of an organized surrender and dismantling of ETA, refusing to support any kind of negotiation. On 30 December 2006 the ceasefire was broken when a car bomb exploded in Madrid's International Airport, Barajas and ETA claimed authorship. Following this, Zapatero gave orders to halt initiatives leading to negotiations with ETA. Demonstrations across Spain followed the next day, most condemning the attack, others condemning the Government's policies and a minority even questioning the authorship of the Madrid bombings.

A massive rally in Madrid followed on 25 February 2007 promoted by the Victims of Terrorism Association (AVT in Spanish acronym), rejecting what are perceived to be concessions from the government to the separatists.

On 10 March 2007, a new massive rally was held in Madrid, gathering - depending on the source's relationships to the government - between 342,000 and over two million people. This demonstration was organized by the opposition party PP and backed by the AVT and several other associations of victims, to not allow Iñaki de Juana Chaos out of prison and accusing Zapatero's government of surrendering to terrorism.

=== Immigration ===
During the meeting of the European Union Justice and Home Affairs Ministers held in Tampere on 22 September 2006, some of the European ministers reprimanded the Spanish authorities for the aforementioned massive regularisation of undocumented immigrants which was regarded as too loose and opposed to the policies of other State members (on 2 September and 3 alone, during the height of the last illegal immigration wave, 2,283 people arrived illegally in the Canary Islands having shipped from Senegal aboard 27 pirogues).

The regularisation of undocumented immigrants numbered at 576,000 in 2005.

=== Foreign policy ===
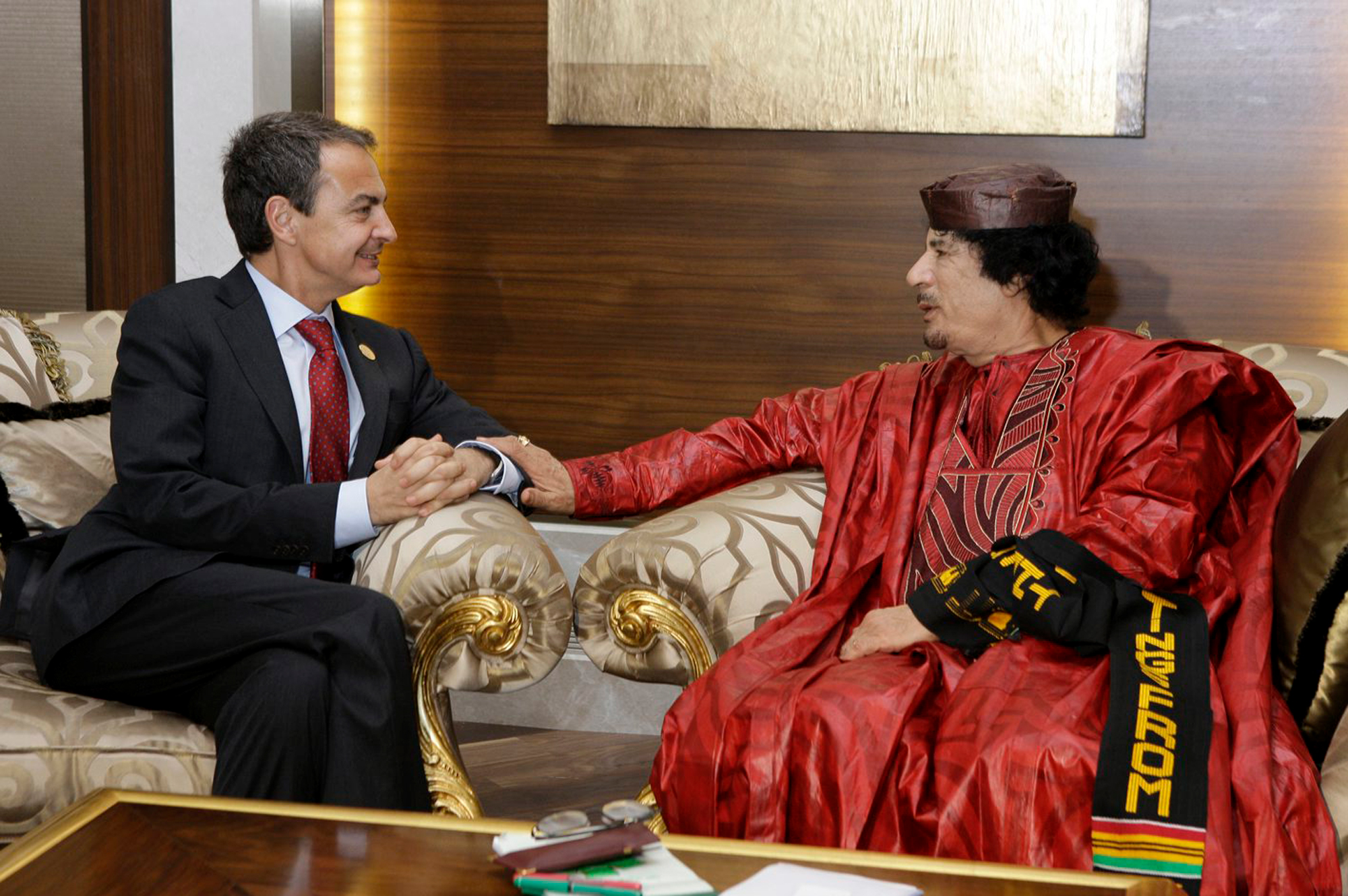
Gaddafi with Spanish Prime Minister José Luis Rodríguez Zapatero at the third EU-Africa Summit in Tripoli in November 2010.

==== Iraq ====
Before being elected, Zapatero opposed the American policy in regard to Iraq pursued by Prime Minister Aznar. During the electoral campaign Zapatero promised to withdraw the troops if control in Iraq was not passed to the United Nations after 30 June (the ending date of the initial Spanish military agreement with the multinational coalition that had overthrown Saddam Hussein). Zapatero declared that he did not intend to withdraw the Spanish troops before that date after being questioned about the issue by the People's Party's leader Mariano Rajoy in his inauguration parliamentary debate as prime minister.

On 19 April 2004 Zapatero announced the withdrawal of the 1,300 Spanish troops in Iraq.

The decision aroused international support worldwide, though the Bush administration claimed that terrorists could perceive it as "a victory obtained due to the 2004 Madrid train bombings". John Kerry, then the Democratic Party candidate for the U.S. presidency, asked Zapatero not to withdraw the Spanish soldiers. Some months after withdrawing the troops, the Zapatero government agreed to increase the number of Spanish soldiers in Afghanistan and to send troops to Haiti to show the Spanish Government's willingness to spend resources on international missions approved by the United Nations.

On 8 June 2004, with the withdrawal already complete, Zapatero's government voted in the United Nations Security Council in favour of Resolution 1546 where the following could be read:

The Security Council, Recognising the importance of international support [...] for the people of Iraq [...], Affirming the importance of international assistance in reconstruction and development of the Iraqi economy [...] 15. Requests Member States and international and regional organizations to contribute assistance to the multinational force, including military forces, as agreed with the Government of Iraq, to help meet the needs of the Iraqi people for security and stability, humanitarian and reconstruction assistance, and to support the efforts of UNAMI […]

==== Latin America ====
An important change in Spanish foreign policy was Zapatero's decision to approach left-wing leaders such as Cuba's Fidel Castro and Venezuela's Hugo Chávez. Zapatero played an important role in the improvement of the relationship between the Cuban government and the European Union.

At the end of March 2005, Zapatero travelled to Venezuela to sign a deal to sell military ships and aircraft to Venezuela worth around US$1 billion. The US government attempted to intervene but failed, accusing Venezuela of being a "dangerous country."

After the election of Evo Morales in Bolivia, Spain was one of the countries the new president visited during his first international tour.

At the 2007 Ibero–American Summit, Chávez called Zapatero's predecessor José María Aznar a fascist for allegedly supporting the 2002 coup attempt. Zapatero used his speaking time to defend Aznar, noting that he was "democratically elected by the Spanish people." Chávez kept trying to interrupt Zapatero, even as summit organisers turned off his microphone. King Juan Carlos, who was seated beside Zapatero, attempted to rebuke Chávez, but was stopped by Zapatero who, displaying significant patience, told him to wait a moment. When Chávez continued to interrupt Zapatero, Juan Carlos, in a rare outburst of anger, asked Chávez "¿Por qué no te callas?" (Why don't you shut up?). The king left the hall shortly afterwards when the President of Nicaragua began to criticize the Spanish government as well. Zapatero continued to participate in the negotiations, later delivering, to loud applause, a speech demanding respect for the leaders of other countries.

==== United States ====
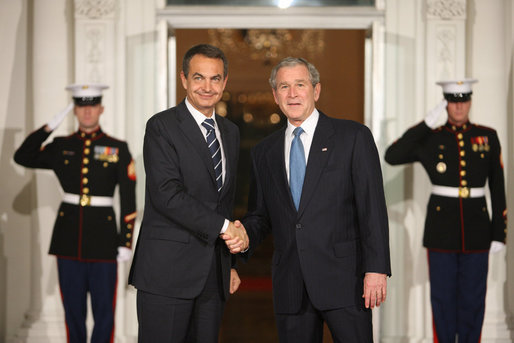
Zapatero with U.S. President George W. Bush, 14 November 2008

The relations between Zapatero and former U.S. president George W. Bush were difficult, mostly as a result of Zapatero's opposition to the Iraq War.

On 12 October 2003, during the Fiesta Nacional de España military parade held in Madrid, then opposition leader and presidential candidate Zapatero remained seated as a U.S. Marine Corps honour guard carrying the American flag walked past Zapatero and other VIPs. Everybody else stood as with the rest of the foreign guest armies representations. He declared afterwards that his action was a protest against the war and certainly not intended as an insult to the American people.

Later on, during an official visit to Tunisia shortly after Zapatero was elected, he asked all of the countries with troops in Iraq to withdraw their soldiers. This declaration moved Bush to send a letter expressing discontent to the Spanish premier.

American troops were subsequently instructed to not take part during the traditional military parade on the Spanish national holiday in 2004 and in 2005, something which they used to, as both the Spanish and American armies, being NATO allies, are part of joint humanitarian missions; American troops returned to the military parade in 2006; this time Zapatero, being the Spanish premier, stood.

Zapatero publicly stated his support for John Kerry as a candidate running in the U.S. Presidential election in 2004. After the election took place, winner George W. Bush did not return Zapatero's congratulation phone call, though the White House firmly denied that Bush's intention was to snub the Spanish prime minister. Meanwhile, Zapatero repeatedly insisted that Spain's relations with the United States were good. In spite of that, Zapatero acknowledged years after that the phone conversation held with President George W. Bush was "unforgettable" and that when told that the Spanish troops were leaving Iraq, the American president had told him "I am very disappointed in you" and that the conversation ended in a "very cold" manner.

Zapatero later told a New York Times reporter off the record that he had a "certain consideration" for Bush, because "I recognise that my electoral success has been influenced by his governing style", i.e., that Bush was so unpopular in Spain that he helped Zapatero win in 2004 and 2008.

In March 2009, Spain announced that it would withdraw its forces from Kosovo. US State Department spokesman Robert Wood issued unusually strong criticism by stating that the United States was "deeply disappointed" by the decision. He said that Washington only learned of the move shortly before Spain announced it publicly. Spanish Defense Minister Carme Chacon made the announcement saying, "The mission has been completed and it is time to return home." Asked if the United States shared that assessment, Wood said, "Not at all." Later on, Vice President Joe Biden stated that the American relationship with Spain goes beyond "whatever disagreement we may have over Kosovo".

==== Europe ====
Zapatero's predecessor, José María Aznar, defended a strong Atlanticist policy. Zapatero has downplayed that policy in favour of a pan-European one. He has also sponsored the idea of an Alliance of Civilizations which is co-sponsored by Turkish Prime Minister Recep Tayyip Erdoğan.

In the writing of what was to be the European Constitution Zapatero accepted the distribution of power proposed by countries such as Germany and France. After signing the treaty in Rome together with other leaders, he decided to call for a referendum, which was held on 20 February 2005. It was the first referendum on the EU treaty, a fact highly publicized by Zapatero's government. A 'Yes' vote was supported by the Socialist Party and the People's Party and as a result almost 77% voted in favour of the European Constitution, but turnout was around 43%. However, this result came to nothing when a referendum in France voted to reject the European Constitution which meant that the EU could not ratify the treaty because support was not unanimous.

==== Presidency of the Council of the European Union ====
On 1 January 2010, Spain assumed the Presidency of the European Union for the first six months of the 18-month 'Trio' along with Belgium and Hungary. The development of the Stockholm Programme Action Plan, the impulse for the EU adhesion to the European Convention on Human Rights, the setting up of the new plan for effective equality between women and men, and the political decision to promote the European protection order, were all important advances achieved under the Spanish Presidency.

Within days, Spain's website for its presidency was defaced by a picture of the main character of a popular television show, Mr. Bean, the supposed lookalike of Zapatero although the XSS attack lasted only several hours.

==== France and Germany ====
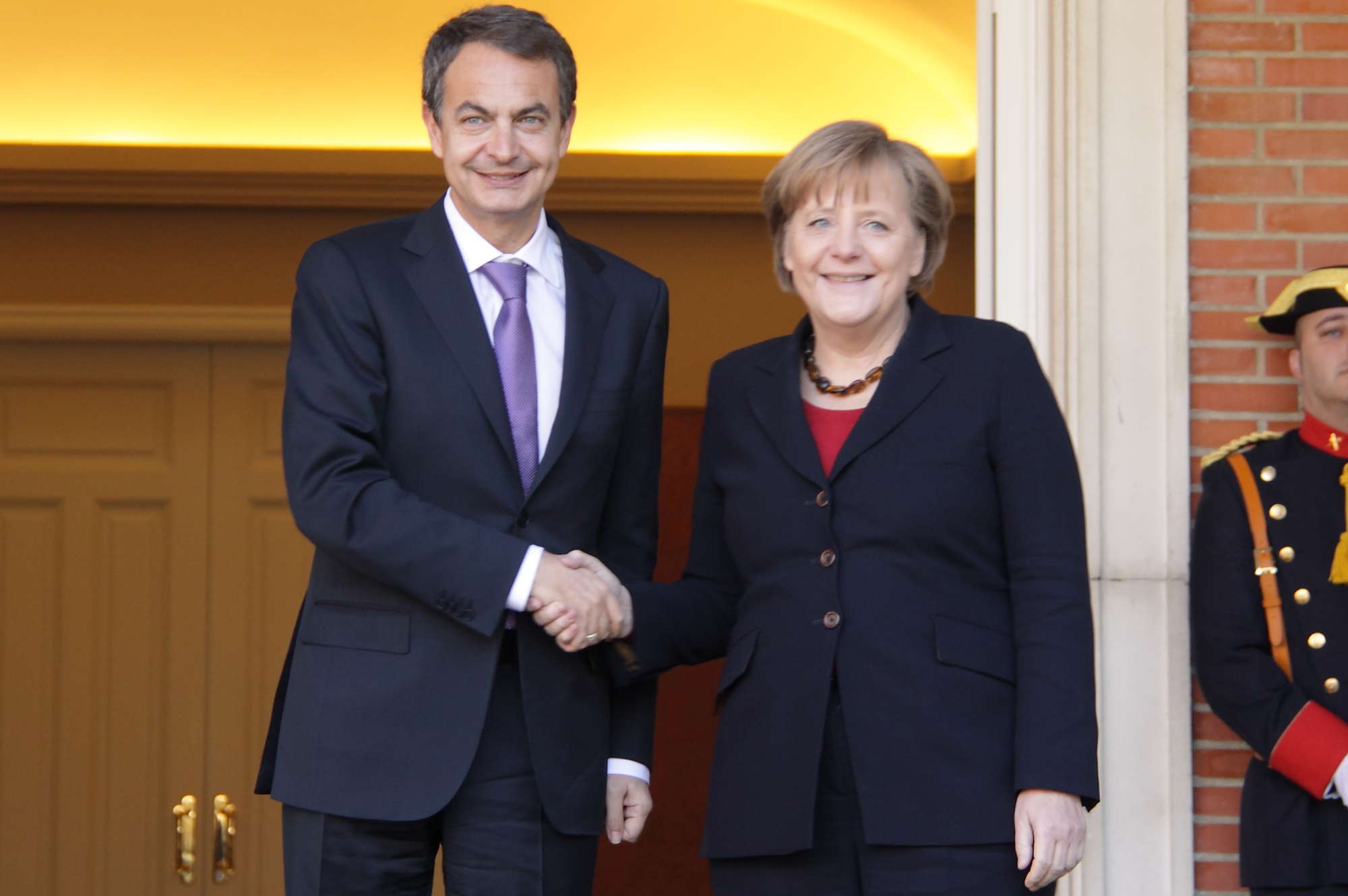
Zapatero with German Chancellor Angela Merkel, 3 February 2011

On 1 March 2005, Zapatero became the first Spanish prime minister to speak to the French National Assembly. He supported the PS candidate Ségolène Royal during her campaign for the 2007 French presidential election.

Zapatero directly supported the SPD candidate, Chancellor Gerhard Schröder, before the German election of 18 September 2005.

==== Gibraltar ====
While Zapatero complained about Gibraltar's celebrations for the tricentenary of British rule and rejected the Gibraltarians' requests for Spain to recognise their right to self-determination, at the end of 2004 his policy changed and he became the first Spanish prime minister to accept the participation of Gibraltar as a partner on the same level as Spain and the United Kingdom in discussions both countries hold regularly concerning the territory. The decision was criticized by many in Spain as a surrender of their claim to sovereignty over Gibraltar as well as an alleged disruption of the Treaty of Utrecht. Zapatero said it was a new way to solve a 300-year-old issue.

=== Israel ===
Zapatero condemned the 2006 Lebanon War. Zapatero issued a statement saying that "From my point of view, Israel is wrong. One thing is self defense, and the other is to launch a counter offensive consisting on a general attack in Lebanon and Gaza that is just going to further escalate violence in the area".

=== 2008 election ===
On 9 March 2008, Zapatero's Spanish Socialist Workers' Party (PSOE) won the general election with 44% of the votes. Two days earlier, on 7 March, Isaías Carrasco, a PSOE Basque politician was shot dead in what is believed to be an attack by ETA, and which resulted in the agreed canceling of the final days of the campaign.

== Post-premiership ==
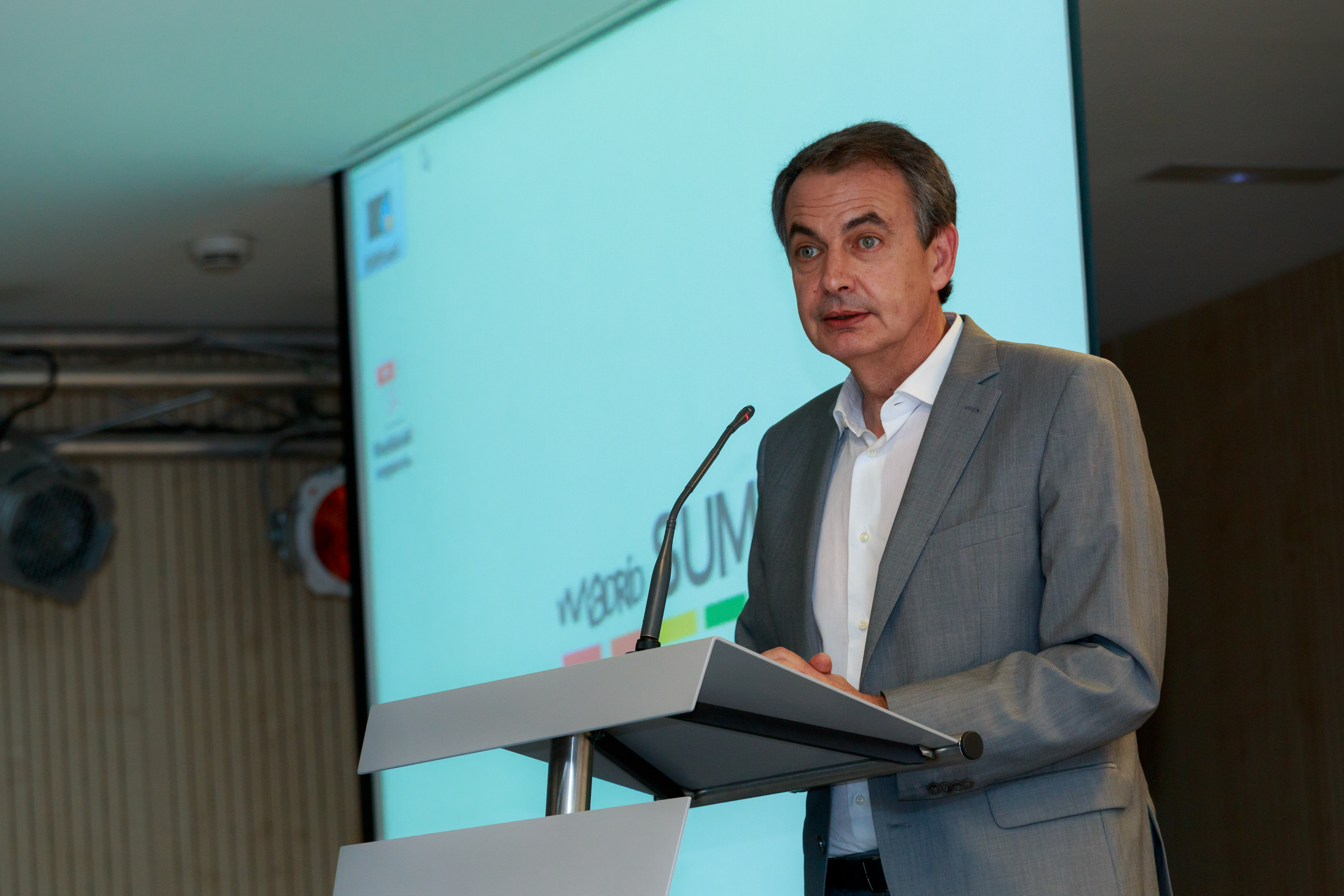
Zapatero in the WorldPride 2017 – Madrid Summit

He left office on 20 December 2011 and left the PSOE's Secretary General chair on 4 February 2012 to Alfredo Pérez Rubalcaba. On 9 February 2012 he took up a role as a member of the Council of State. He left the Council of State in 2015 in order to become the President of the Advisory Board of the Institute for Cultural Diplomacy, a Berlin-based organization trying to foster intercultural relations.

Backed by UNASUR, Zapatero was promoted to a role as mediator in Venezuela in 2016. As a result of the conversations he took part in, the so-called "Acuerdo de Convivencia Democrática por Venezuela" (endorsed by Zapatero and Danilo Medina) was proposed in February 2018 so it could be ratified by the parties in conflict. However, the document (tentatively trying to set a roadmap for legislative elections, respect for the rule of law, a plan to improve the economic situation and a reparatory truth commission) was accepted by the Venezuelan government but rejected by the opposition Democratic Unity Roundtable (MUD).

In 2019, Zapatero joined the inaugural meeting of the so-called Puebla Group in Buenos Aires, a conference of left-leaning political leaders.

During the 2016 PSOE crisis and the subsequent 2017 PSOE federal party congress, Zapatero expressed and unconditionally supported Susana Díaz—the Andalusian President and an opponent to incumbent party leader Pedro Sánchez. However, after Sánchez's re-election to the party leadership in 2017, Zapatero became a major ally of Sánchez. Zapatero enthusiastically campaigned for Sánchez's re-election as Prime Minister during Spain's 2023 election to a surprise victory, rallying the party's "old guard" that had long been skeptical of Sánchez. Zapatero also served as the Sánchez government's main mediator with Catalan separatist leader Carles Puigdemont, who has lived in self-imposed exile in Belgium since the 2017 independence referendum.

On 19 August 2024, Spanish far-right union Manos Limpias filed a complaint with the ICC against former Spanish prime minister José Luis Rodríguez Zapatero, accusing him of being a "collaborator" with the Maduro administration. According to said complaint, Zapatero would have received the rights to operate a gold mine in Venezuela; however, no evidence of this has been made public. Zapatero himself dismissed the allegations as "surreal".

=== Judicial case ===
He became the first Spanish prime minister to be charged when, on 19 May 2026, the National Court charged him with money laundering and membership of a criminal organisation in connection with an investigation into the alleged laundering of the €53 million public bailout that the second government of Pedro Sánchez provided to the airline Plus Ultra in 2021. As part of the investigation, the General Commissariat of Judiciary Police carried out searches at the former president's office, as well as at companies linked to his daughters and business circles, where documents and electronic devices were seized.

The investigation is examining possible offences of membership of a criminal organisation, influence peddling and document forgery, along with other irregularities relating to financial and corporate transactions linked to the loan granted to the airline during the COVID-19 pandemic.

On the very day he was charged, Zapatero denied having any commercial companies in Spain or abroad and rejected any involvement in the Plus Ultra bailout, stating that his public and private activities had been conducted in accordance with the law and that he would cooperate with the authorities.

On 21 May, the Court ordered the freezing of some of Zapatero's bank accounts.

== Ideology ==
Zapatero's social-democratic project of Nueva Vía ("New Way") was based to a substantial degree on the republicanism of Philip Pettit ("freedom as non-domination"). Branded domestically as socialismo cívico, his initial vision was underpinned by the extension of minority rights, the strengthening of the welfare state, a contrast between "constitutional patriotism" and "nationalism", the widening of spaces for deliberation and the defence of international organizations and multilateralism.

== Honours and awards ==
=== National honours ===
- Collar of the Order of Isabella the Catholic (30 December 2011)
- Grand Cross of the Order of Saint Raymond of Peñafort (24 June 2025)

=== International honours ===
Ribbon	Distinction	Country	Date	Ref.
	Grand Cross of the Order of the Sun of Peru	Peru	8 July 2004	
	Grand Officer of the Order of the Three Stars	Latvia	14 October 2004	
	Grand Cross of the Order of the Lithuanian Grand Duke Gediminas	Lithuania	1 June 2005	
	Grand Cross of the Order of Christ	Portugal	25 September 2006	
	Order of the Cross of Terra Mariana, 1st Class	Estonia	5 July 2007	
	Grand Cross of the Order of the Star of Romania	Romania	22 November 2007	
	Sash of Special Category of the Order of the Aztec Eagle	Mexico	11 June 2008	
	Grand Cross of the Order of the Liberator General San Martín	Argentina	24 April 2009	
	Star of Honor of the Order of the State of Palestine	Palestine	15 October 2009	
	Grand Cordon of the Order of Ouissam Alaouite	Morocco	30 July 2016	

=== Others ===
- Honorary Doctorate from the National University of San Marcos (16 May 2008)
- Honorary Doctorate from Toulouse Capitole University (12 January 2015)

== See also ==
- Viva Zapatero!
- Governments of Rodríguez Zapatero

== Notes ==
Party political offices
Vacant Title last held by Joaquín Almunia	Secretary-General of the Spanish Socialist Workers' Party; 2000–2012	Succeeded by Alfredo Pérez Rubalcaba
Political offices
Vacant Title last held by Joaquín Almunia	Leader of the Opposition; 2000–2004	Succeeded by Mariano Rajoy
Preceded by José María Aznar	Prime Minister of Spain; 2004–2011	Succeeded by Mariano Rajoy
