= Promecal =

Promecal, also known by the corporate name Grupo de Comunicación Promecal, S. L., is a mass media company in Spain. The company's name is short for Promotora de Medios de Castilla y León.

== History and assets ==
The company was founded in 2000 by construction magnate Antonio Miguel Méndez Pozo. Its newspapers in Castile and León include the Diario de Burgos, Diario Palentino and El Día de Valladolid. In television, it owns two terrestrial digital (TDT) channels (Televisión digital terrestre en España) in Navarre through its subsidy Sumando Comunicación – Navarra Televisión and Navarra Televisión 2. In Castile and León, it owns 50% of Castilla y León Televisión, the only TDT operator in the region; its channels are La 7 and La 8. It also owns the news agency ICAL, and operates several Onda Cero radio franchises. In 2003, it held 40% of the shares in Antena 3 in Castile and León.

In 2020, the company expanded into the region of La Rioja. It launched the newspaper El Día de La Rioja in April, and the television channel 7 La Rioja in October.

== Organisation ==
As of 2010, Promecal's advertising was managed by a subsidy of PRISA, while Promecal's presses were used for some PRISA titles.

Promecal's internal structuring includes executive boards in each of its companies. Méndez Pozo's brothers and sons dominate executive positions.
