= LA7 =

LA-7 or LA 7 can refer to:

- L.A. 7, Television series starring pop group S Club 7
- WWII Soviet aircraft La-7
- La7, Italian Television channel
- La 7 (Castile and León), Spanish television channel in Castile and León
- La 7 (Region of Murcia), Spanish television channel in Region of Murcia
- LaSiete, former Spanish Television channel
- Louisiana's 7th congressional district
- Louisiana Highway 7
