= La 8 =

- Country: Spain
- Broadcast area: Castile and León
- Network: Castilla y León Televisión
- Headquarters: Valladolid

Programming
- Language(s): Spanish
- Picture format: 1080i HDTV

Ownership
- Owner: Promecal
- Sister channels: La 7

History
- Launched: 9 March 2009
- Former names: Cyl8 (2009-2011)

Links
- Website: www.cyltv.es

Availability

Terrestrial
- Digital: Mux 25 (Valladolid)

La 8 is a Spanish television channel, launched in 2009. It was founded and started to broadcast in 2009. Along with La 7, it is part of Castilla y León Televisión, privately owned by Promecal.

== History ==
In 2008, the Junta de Castilla y León began the tender for the delivery of DTT broadcast licenses in the region, due to the fact that Castilla y León lacked regional television channels, unlike most of the Spanish autonomous communities.

On January 24, 2009, the two licenses were granted to the company Radio Televisión de Castilla y León. The granting of the second regional television license included the obligation to broadcast differentiated programming for the provinces of Castilla y León, for which reason La 8 was destined for this type of programming.

The channel began its broadcasts on March 9, 2009, with the name CyL8 to invite the public to place it at number 8 on television following the logical channel number. In September 2011 the channel was renamed La 8.

== Programming ==
The general programming of La 8 stands out for the broadcast of sports, contests, series and repetitions of programs that were already broadcast on La 7. On the other hand, the channel's news is broadcast differently for each of the nine provinces of Castile and León: Ávila, Burgos, León, Palencia, Salamanca, Segovia, Soria, Valladolid and Zamora, in addition to the comarca of El Bierzo, which is part of the Province of León, but has a very marked regional identity.
