= Sonsoles Espinosa =

Spanish soprano

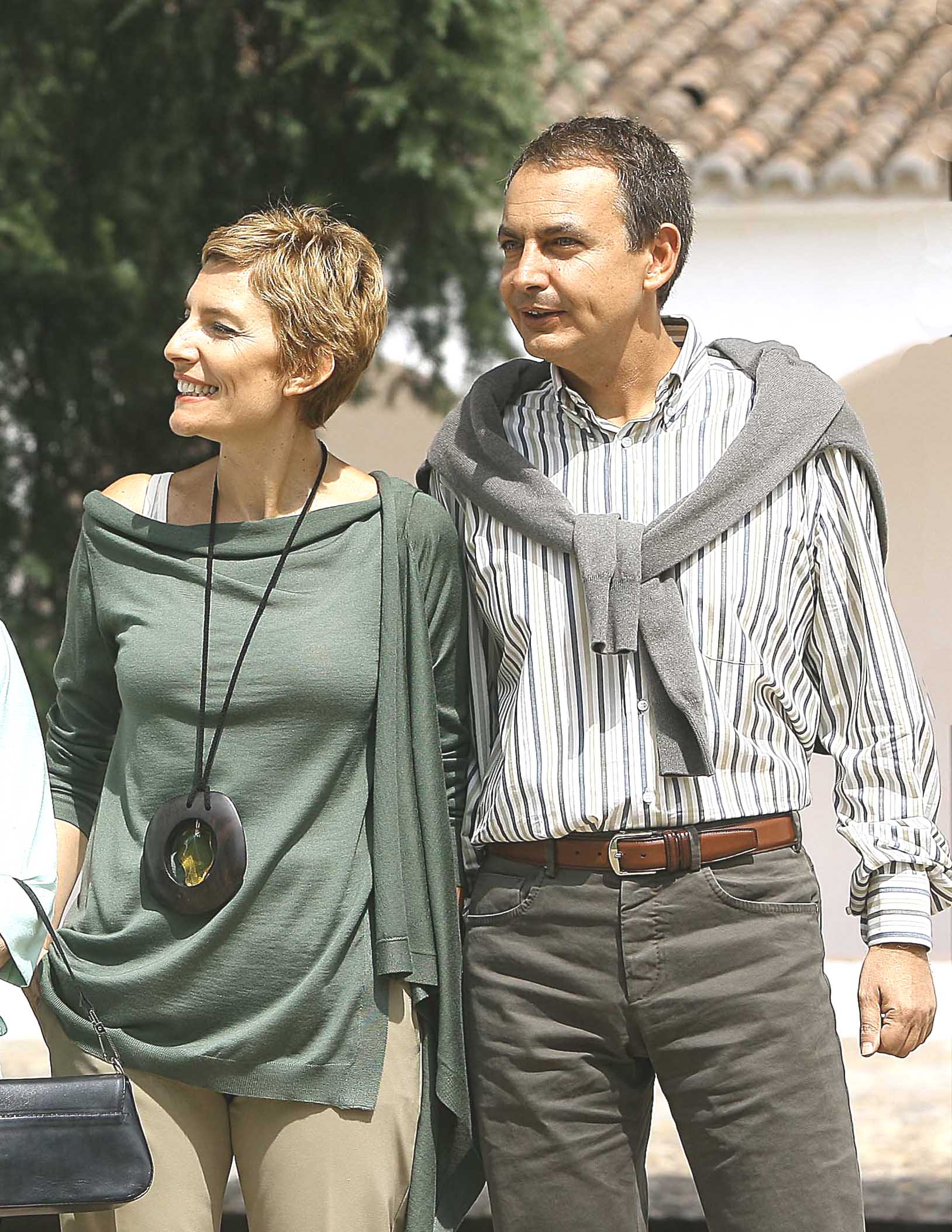
Sonsoles Espinosa and Zapatero

Sonsoles Espinosa Díaz (born 8 November 1961) is a Spanish classical singer and music teacher. She is married to José Luis Rodríguez Zapatero, the former Prime Minister of Spain.

== Biography ==
She was born in Ávila, the daughter of a military officer, and received a law degree from the Universidad de León. She met Rodríguez Zapatero whilst they were both studying law at León in 1981. They married on 27 January 1990 and have two daughters, born in 1993 and 1995.

Sonsoles is a soprano and music teacher, and several times she stated she loves singing soft rock music. While living in León, she was a member of the city's prestigious university choir and used to be a music teacher for seven to nine pupils at one of León's and Spain's most prestigious schools, Colegio Leonés. Since moving to Madrid she has continued to sing, as a substitute member of the chorus at the city's opera house, the Teatro Real, and more recently with the choir of the government-owned broadcasting service RTVE.

In 2003, she gave an interview to the magazine La Razón, where some of her opinions about abortion generated controversy, mainly from right-wing think tank groups. She said abortion should be legal in all countries and that "those who don't understand this are people from the 18th century."
