= Diario de León =

Spanish daily newspaper

- Decano de la prensa leonesa
- Type: Daily newspaper
- Format: Print and digital
- Owner: Edigrup Media
- Founder: Juan Manuel Sanz y Saravia
- Publisher: El Diario de León, S.A.
- Editor-in-chief: Joaquín Sánchez Torné
- Founded: February 3, 1906; 120 years ago
- Language: Spanish
- Headquarters: León, Spain
- City: León
- Country: Spain
- ISSN: 1889-6022
- OCLC number: 733135594
- Website: www.diariodeleon.es

The Diario de León (Spanish: [diˈaɾjo de leˈon]; lit. 'The León Daily') is a Spanish daily newspaper of general interest published in León, in the autonomous community of Castile and León. Founded in 1906 on the initiative of the Bishop of León Juan Manuel Sanz y Saravia, it is the oldest newspaper in León. It belongs to the media group Edigrup Media.

== History ==
=== Foundation and early years (1906–1930) ===
The first issue of the Diario de León was published on 3 February 1906, the feast day of Saint Blaise, under the motto set by Bishop Sanz y Saravia: a newspaper that would «combat, fight and rebut», within Christian humanism and the defence of the interests of the Church and Spain. The evening before, a priest and three founding members had made a pilgrimage to the shrine of the Virgen del Camino to entrust the project to the patron saint of the Kingdom of León. In its early days the editorial offices were located at 5 Calle del Paso, and it was printed at the workshop of a Mr Tejedor, at 17 Calle La Paloma in León. Although the inaugural issue has not survived —the first days suffered «a typographical disaster» at that «old and dilapidated» printing press— the newspaper's archive holds copies from the second issue, dated 5 February 1906: the first issue appeared on a Saturday and, as the newspaper did not publish on Sundays, readers had to wait until Monday for the second edition.

The first editor was Eloy Blanco del Valle —described as «a man of vast culture, refined piety and deep convictions»— who was succeeded by the scholar Mariano Domínguez Berrueta (1906–1907), who raised the circulation to 1,700 copies a day. He was followed by Isaac Martín Granizo, a young lawyer and intellectual who took up the post at the age of 26. He transformed the newspaper, imposing his own style, drew up a code of ethics and gave the paper a spirit of modernity, even opening its pages to the feminist movement and making the campaign for women's rights newsworthy. He died prematurely in 1909 at the age of 28 from a heart condition, a loss that shocked León society.

In its early days the newspaper appeared in the afternoon, ran to four pages and was sold at five céntimos a copy or one peseta for a monthly subscription. Early contributors included José González (Risaco), Alberto López Argüello and Raimundo Rodríguez Vega.

On 31 May 1906, the newspaper ran a three-column front page covering the wedding of King Alfonso XIII to Princess Victoria Eugenie, the anarchist attack by Mateo Morral and the death of the Leonese Eusebio López Torbado in the explosion, establishing a journalistic approach that would endure: giving national news a local León angle. Under Martín Granizo's editorship, the newspaper also published its first special edition devoted to El Bierzo, to mark the coronation of the Virgen de la Encina, initiating a sustained focus on the Bierzo region.

The newspaper was born at a time of journalistic vitality in León, competing with titles such as La Democracia, El Porvenir and León de España. It was also in 1906 that the journalists of León founded the Asociación de la Prensa de León.

In 1911 the young schoolteacher Calimería Montiel Marcos —born in Fresno de la Vega— joined as a columnist at the age of 23, becoming a pioneer of women's journalism in the province. Several decades would pass before another woman, Concha Espina, wrote for the paper.

The installation of the newspaper's first telephone in 1916, which bore the number 110, and the incorporation two years later of the chronicler Carmelo Hernández Moros, «Lamparilla» —also known as «el divino sordo» (the divine deaf man), considered by local historians to be the most popular journalist in the history of León— are landmark moments in the paper's history.

In 1920 the paper changed ownership and rebranded itself from «Periódico de noticias» to «Periódico católico regional», becoming a mouthpiece for the Catholic trade unions. In 1921 the newspaper moved to Calle Pablo Flórez, next to the Cathedral, premises it would occupy for more than six decades. During the 1920s the paper campaigned on behalf of Leonese soldiers serving in the Rif campaign and backed Cultural Leonesa from 29 April 1922.

=== The Republic and Civil War (1931–1939) ===
Between 1919 and 1921 the newspaper suffered the consequences of paper rationing and wage demands by the Sociedad de Tipógrafos. The strikes of 1931 again prevented publication, as would happen on the eve of the Civil War.

The proclamation of the Second Spanish Republic on 14 April 1931 put the editorial team under strain: an editorial provoked an angry response from Republicans, flooding the offices with letters and phone calls, yet the paper held firm in defence of its Catholic ideals.

During the conflict Antonio González de Lama temporarily replaced Filemón de la Cuesta as editor, and under his stewardship the newspaper barely survived. In the months before the military uprising, during the Popular Front government, the paper's offices were stormed and its equipment requisitioned for military use; normal publication resumed after the Nationalist forces took León in July 1936. The paper had correspondents at the front, including Mariano Domínguez Berrueta and González de Lama himself.

=== Post-war period and modernisation (1940–1973) ===
In 1956 the publishing company Sarpe acquired a stake, leaving the Diocese in a minority for the first time. José Luis Pérez Herrero became editor that year as the first lay director. In 1964 Alfredo Marcos Oteruelo opened the doors to professionally trained journalists with no ecclesiastical ties.

Antonio González de Lama —a priest, poet and co-founder in 1944 of the celebrated journal Espadaña— was one of the paper's most emblematic editors, serving three separate terms (1937–1939, 1956 and 1961–1964). A school and a street in León bear his name.

In April 1973 the Diario de León abandoned traditional letterpress printing —which had barely evolved since Gutenberg— and adopted offset printing, making it one of the pioneers of the technology in Spain: only four newspapers in the entire country had adopted the new system at that point. A small American Goss press replaced the compositors, Linotype machines and flatbed press, and introduced a new professional role: the page designer or layout editor. The first was Luis Infante Bravo, a journalist trained at the University of Navarre who later became editor of the sports daily Marca in the 1990s. That same year the paper became a morning publication.

On 6 November 1973 Javier Olave Lusarreta was appointed editor at the age of only 26, making him one of the youngest editors of a daily newspaper in Spain at the time. With Alfredo Marcos Oteruelo and Olave came «a new concept of journalism made by journalists», trained at the Official School of Journalism and later at university Schools of Information Science, and notable bylines were added including Bernardino Martínez Hernando, Jesús Torbado, José Antonio Carro Celada, César Aller and Ernesto Escapa.

=== Democratic transition and consolidation (1975–2007) ===
During the Transition, the paper covered the assassination of Carrero Blanco —which occurred shortly after Olave's appointment— the death of Franco, the proclamation of Juan Carlos I and the first democratic elections. After Olave left for Madrid in 1977, Íñigo Domínguez took over as editor, maintaining the editorial structure while strengthening the provincial correspondents' network and the Bierzo desk.

==== The acquisition of La Hora Leonesa (1984) ====
In early 1984 a business alliance led by builder Servando Torío de las Heras —who had replaced Ángel Panero as chairman, himself a builder and then president of the Federación Leonesa de Empresarios— together with José Martínez Núñez and mining entrepreneur Antonio Rey, with politician Miguel Pérez Villar as strategist, decided to bid at the state auction of La Hora Leonesa —successor to the Falangist newspaper Proa, which had been part of the Press Chain of the Movement. Fernando Aller González became acting editor with the aim of raising the paper's standing ahead of the forthcoming challenge.

In March 1984 the Diario de León bid alone at auction and purchased La Hora Leonesa for 130 million pesetas. Two months later, on 16 May 1984, the acquired paper closed. The Diario de León left its historic premises on Calle Pablo Flórez and moved to the former La Hora Leonesa offices on Calle Lucas de Tuy. It took advantage of the new press to abandon the tabloid format and print at the current broadsheet size, replaced the masthead with the Gothic lettering it still uses today, increased pagination from 24 to 40 pages and modernised the newsroom by introducing computers in place of typewriters for the first time.

==== From the split to the new headquarters (1986–1997) ====
In 1986 a faction of the board of directors led by José Martínez Núñez broke away to found La Crónica de León, a rival title launched in March 1986. Following an unprecedented editorial experiment in which an attempt was made to abolish the editor's role, converting it into «deputy director-general for journalistic affairs», Aller left the paper. The board appointed José Luis Rodríguez García as director-general, but after the experiment failed he was dismissed a year later. In 1987 Francisco J. Martínez Carrión became editor with Fernando Aller González as his principal collaborator, consolidating the newspaper with new sections, more local coverage and the introduction of colour in the sports supplements.

In the late 1980s Antonio Vázquez Fernández became chairman of the board of directors. Under his impetus a new headquarters was built on the industrial estate of Trobajo del Camino (San Andrés del Rabanedo), inaugurated in October 1991. The new facilities included a Swedish Solna rotary press, faster and with greater pagination, which made it possible to introduce colour into the paper's general edition. On 16 April 1994 a dedicated edition for El Bierzo was launched, with its own front page and additional pages covering the region, produced from the delegation in Ponferrada.

==== The Voz de Galicia Group era (1997–2007) ====
In 1997 the Diario de León joined the Voz de Galicia Group, whose flagship title is La Voz de Galicia, Spain's fifth-largest general-interest newspaper. The group entrusted Fernando Aller with the editorship once more and invested in a greater commitment to local coverage through an expanded Bierzo edition, new regional supplements and the opening of delegations in Astorga and La Bañeza. In 1998 the Diario de León launched its digital edition. In 2003 the Corporación Voz increased its shareholding and Santiago Rey assumed the chairmanship of the board.

=== Integration into Edigrup (2007–present) ===
In March 2007 businessman José Luis Ulibarri acquired 84.2% of the shares from the Voz de Galicia Group, incorporating the title into what would become Edigrup Media.

In March 2009 the newspaper announced the closure of its own rotary press in Trobajo del Camino and the transfer of printing to the Calprint plant in Benavente, citing ageing machinery and the need for more colour pages. Shortly afterwards, in January 2010, the dedicated El Bierzo edition was discontinued for technical reasons, although the Bierzo delegation —located in the Edificio Minero on Avenida de Valdés in Ponferrada— remains active.

In June 2013 Joaquín Sánchez Torné became editor. From 8 March 2014 the Diario de León has been distributed jointly with El Mundo across the province. Under Sánchez Torné the paper covered major news events including the assassination of Isabel Carrasco, former president of the Provincial Deputation of León, in May 2014.

In 2023 the Diario de León moved its headquarters from the Trobajo del Camino industrial estate to the Edificio Europa on Avenida de Reyes Leoneses in León city centre.

== Notable contributors ==
Throughout its history the Diario de León has published contributions from outstanding figures of literature and journalism. From its earliest decades its roster of contributors included prominent figures of law and letters such as the lawyer and politician Francisco Roa de la Vega, the writer Antonio de Valbuena and the scholar Mariano Domínguez Berrueta.

From the mid-twentieth century the paper became closely associated with major literary figures. Among the Leonese writers, many of them linked to the poetry group around the journal Espadaña, were Antonio Pereira, who from 1950 maintained a regular column entitled «Atalaya» and had published his first piece in the paper as a teenager; Premio Cervantes winner Antonio Gamoneda; Real Academia Española members José María Merino and Luis Mateo Díez; poet Antonio Colinas; poet and official chronicler of León Victoriano Crémer; writer Juan Carlos Mestre; official chronicler of León Máximo Cayón Waldaliso; cartoonist César Trapiello, with his comic strip Aventuras de Tiburcio y Cogollo; and the priest and poet Antonio González de Lama, who also served as editor.

Francisco Umbral deserves special mention. He arrived in León in 1958 and between January and February 1961 wrote a daily column for the Diario de León entitled «La ciudad y los días» (The City and Its Days). It was in this column that he used his celebrated pen name for the first time, having previously been known as Francisco Pérez Martínez. Sponsored by his cousin José Luis Pérez Perelétegui and journalist Alfredo Marcos Oteruelo, Umbral left for Madrid in February 1961 to begin his national career, writing years later in a special edition for the paper's 75th anniversary that «the Diario de León gave me my first opportunity to be one» (a newspaper columnist).

The journalistic renewal of the 1970s brought notable bylines that raised the level of political and cultural debate during the late Franco era and the Transition, including Bernardino Martínez Hernando, Jesús Torbado, José Antonio Carro Celada, César Aller and Ernesto Escapa.

== Supplements ==
The newspaper publishes the following supplements:

- El Filandón: literary and cultural supplement.
- Innova: innovation, science and technology supplement.
- Diario del Deporte: sport supplement focused on Leonese sport.
- Diario del Motor: motoring information.
- Agro León: farming and agri-food sector information.
- Destinos: tourism and travel supplement.
- Mascotas: pet supplement.
- La Revista: Sunday general-interest magazine.

== Awards and recognition ==
- Gold Medal of the Province of León (Provincial Deputation of León, 1981)
- Gold Medal of the City of León (León City Council, 1996, on the occasion of its 90th anniversary)
- National Prize for the Promotion of Reading (awarded to the El Filandón supplement, Ministry of Culture, 2004)
- Commemorative stamp (Correos, 2006, «Centenary Newspapers» series)
- Gold Medal of the Cortes of Castile and León (collective award to the centenary newspapers of the community, 2007)
- Diario de León street in León (municipal plenary session of 27 February 2009)
- Commemorative coupon (ONCE, 2026, on the occasion of its 120th anniversary)

== Editors ==
- Eloy Blanco del Valle (1906)
- Mariano Domínguez Berrueta (1906–1907)
- Isaac Martín-Granizo Rodríguez (1907–1908)
- Víctor Campo (1908)
- Isaac Martín-Granizo Rodríguez (1908–1909)
- Francisco F. Gironda (1909–1910)
- José González Risaco (1909–1910)
- Baltasar García-Arista Antón (1910–1914)
- Francisco del Río Alonso (1914–1915)
- Antolín Gutiérrez Cuñado (1916–1927)
- Filemón de la Cuesta González (1927–1937)
- Antonio González de Lama (1937–1939)
- Filemón de la Cuesta González (1939–1956)
- Antonio González de Lama (1956)
- José Luis Pérez Herrero (1956–1960)
- Antonio González de Lama (1961–1964)
- Alfredo Marcos Oteruelo (1964–1973)
- Javier Olave Lusarreta (1973–1977)
- Íñigo Domínguez de Calatayud (1978–1983)
- Fernando Aller González (1984)
- José Luis Rodríguez García (1984–1985)
- Francisco J. Martínez Carrión (1985–1997)
- Fernando Aller González (1997–2010)
- Pablo Rodríguez Lago (2010–2013)
- Joaquín Sánchez Torné (from 2013)

== Bibliography ==
- Elena González, Esteban (2012). "Comunicación y poder en la construcción del Estado autonómico: La Política informativa de la Junta de Castilla y León y los intentos de creación de una conciencia regional (1983–1986)". Historia Actual Online (28). Asociación de Historia Actual: 115–125. ISSN 1696-2060.

== See also ==
- Edigrup Media
