= Diario de Burgos =

Spanish newspaper

- Type: Daily newspaper
- Format: Tabloid
- Founder(s): Juan Albarellos Berroeta; Juan García Rubio
- Publisher: Promecal
- Editor: Álvaro Melcón
- Founded: 1 April 1891; 134 years ago
- Language: Spanish
- Headquarters: Burgos, Castile and León
- Circulation: 4,100 (2024)
- Website: diariodeburgos.es

The Diario de Burgos is a Spanish daily newspaper. Its primary market is the province of Burgos in the autonomous community of Castile and León, Spain. The newspaper is based in Burgos. Its first edition was published in 1891.

== History ==
On 1 April 1891 the first edition of the newspaper was published in the city of Burgos, initially as an evening paper without Sunday edition, later becoming a morning paper. Its promoters and founders were the lawyer, writer and journalist from Burgos Juan Albarellos Berroeta, appointed chief editor, and Juan García Rubio, secretary of the Chamber of the Audience of Burgos, who in 1892 left the newspaper, becoming Juan Albarellos in the sole owner, as well as editor and director of the publication that directed it until his death in 1922. During the first fifteen years, Félix García Carrasco was its manager. At the death of the founder, succeeded in the management and ownership by his brother, Ignacio Albarellos Berroeta, industrial engineer and artillery lieutenant colonel, holding the position of director until 1942.

The first issue cost 5 cents of a peseta and it published under the name Diario de Burgos.

The first printing press was an old machine of French origin (1860–1870) brand "Marinoni" moved manually, two people were needed to make it work, one operating the steering wheel and the other reaching and bringing the sheets of paper together so that print. The printing press was installed in a villa on Avenida de la Isla No. 1, where the Printing Office, Editorial Office and Administration were located. Two typographers from Madrid and two unpaid clerks were the first resources, making the first print runs of about three hundred copies in A1 format. Its first relevant information display was due to the collision of two trains in Quintanilleja (municipality of Villangómez).

On 7 November 1892, the newspaper offices moved from the calle la Isla No. 1, to the calle Almirante Bonifaz, No. 7 and 9 (phone 165). The facilities and the registered office were relocated years later to calle de Vitoria No. 16 (today, 13, ground floor). Subsequently, the headquarters were located on calle San Pedro de Cardeña, until in 2004 all the media of the Promecal group were unified in a building located on avenida de Castilla y León 62, where it remains today.

As for the layout, typical of a journalistic organ of the provinces, it was of an unquestionable precariousness and simplicity, the absence of separation between sections is appreciated. There was a lack of engravings, drawings and photographs, which were not incorporated until 1933, and discontinuously. From 2 June 1940, the newspaper changed format, past the "big on", the de sábana (as known in Spanish journalistic jargon) to the type tabloide, but with 6 columns instead of 7.

During the period of the Second Republic, it was one of the main conservative newspapers in Burgos – along with the traditionalist El Castellano.

On 15 August 1963, the new rotary press was inaugurated in a solemn act with the assistance of the Burgos authorities and the Director General of the Press, Manuel Jiménez Quílez, representing the Minister of Information and Tourism, with blessing the facilities by the Bishop Vicar capitulate, Demetrio Mansilla Reoyo.

From March 1942 until his death in 1978 Esteban Sáez Alvarado was the director of the newspaper, and Ángel León Goyri (brother of the poet María Teresa León) the management and administrative director, succeeding his son Ángel León Albarellos. He succeeded Esteban, Andrés Ruiz, who was editor-in-chief and director of the Monday Sheet. Since 1978 Andrés Ruiz Valderrama was director and Javier Gutiérrez manager. He was followed by Vicente Ruiz de Mencía who was succeeded by Antonio Mencía, who had been deputy director of the newspaper as well as director of the Diario Palentino and La Estafeta de Navarra. On 1 January 2010 journalist Raúl Briongos Velasco became the new director, who had been chief editor. At the end of 2019, Briongos left the newspaper's management to join the news headquarters of Radio Televisión Castilla y León, in which the publishing company, Promecal, is co-owner. He was replaced by Álvaro Melcón Palacios. Óscar Gálvez became deputy director. The informative structure changed slightly.

Ownership of the medium remained for a century in the hands of the founder's family, who in 1991 sold it to businessman Antonio Méndez Pozo (current director of the Promecal group (Promotora de Medios de Castilla y León), to which the Diario de Burgos, among others, belongs).

The newspaper, in addition to an edition for Burgos, has two editions, one for the city and region of Aranda de Duero and another for Miranda de Ebro. In addition, it has small delegations in the regions of Bureba and Merindades, which complete the news of the province with their own sections every day.

Currently, Diario de Burgos, which has a staff of fifty professionals, continues to be the province's benchmark newspaper, both on paper and digitally.

== Square named after it ==
In 2015, the Governing Board of the Burgos City Council decided to name as "Diario de Burgos" a roundabout located at the confluence of paseo de Laserna and avenida del Conde de Guadalhorce.

== Tino Barriuso Young Poetry Award ==
In memory of the poet Tino Barriuso, a regular contributor to the newspaper, Diario de Burgos founded and sponsored a Young Poetry award in 2018, aimed at authors under 25 years of age. The first winner, announced in 2019, was Rodrigo García Marina with his work Edad ("Age"); in 2020 the winner was Juan Gallego Benot with his first book Oración en el huerto ("Oration in the Garden").
