= La 7 (Castile and León) =

- Country: Spain
- Broadcast area: Castile and León
- Network: Castilla y León Televisión
- Headquarters: Valladolid

Programming
- Language(s): Spanish
- Picture format: 1080i HDTV

Ownership
- Owner: Promecal
- Sister channels: La 8

History
- Launched: 9 March 2009
- Former names: CyLTV (2011-2019); CyL7 (2009-2011)

Links
- Website: www.cyltv.es

Availability

Terrestrial
- Digital: Mux 25 (Valladolid)

La 7 is a Spanish television channel, launched in 2009. It was founded and started to broadcast in 2009. Along with La 8, it is part of Castilla y León Televisión, privately owned by Promecal.

== History ==
In 2008, the Junta de Castilla y León began the tender for the delivery of DTT broadcast licenses in the region, due to the fact that Castilla y León lacked regional television channels, unlike most of the Spanish autonomous communities.

On January 24, 2009, the two licenses were granted to the company Radio Televisión de Castilla y León.

The channel began its broadcasts on March 9, 2009, with the name CyL7 to invite the public to place it at number 7 on television following the logical channel number. In September 2011 the channel was renamed CyLTV. In 2019 the channel underwent another identity change, when it was renamed La 7, returning to one of the channel's original names.

== Programming ==
La 7 broadcasts general programming, highlighting news and entertainment programs. The channel must also fulfill some public service functions since it acts as the regional television for Castile and León despite being privately owned.
