= Castilla y León Televisión =

Castilla y León Televisión (CyLTV), also known by the corporate name Radio Televisión de Castilla y León, S. A. is a private company holding the only TDT (Televisión digital terrestre en España) licence in the Spanish autonomous community of Castile and León. The company is owned by Promecal and Edigrup Media.

== History ==
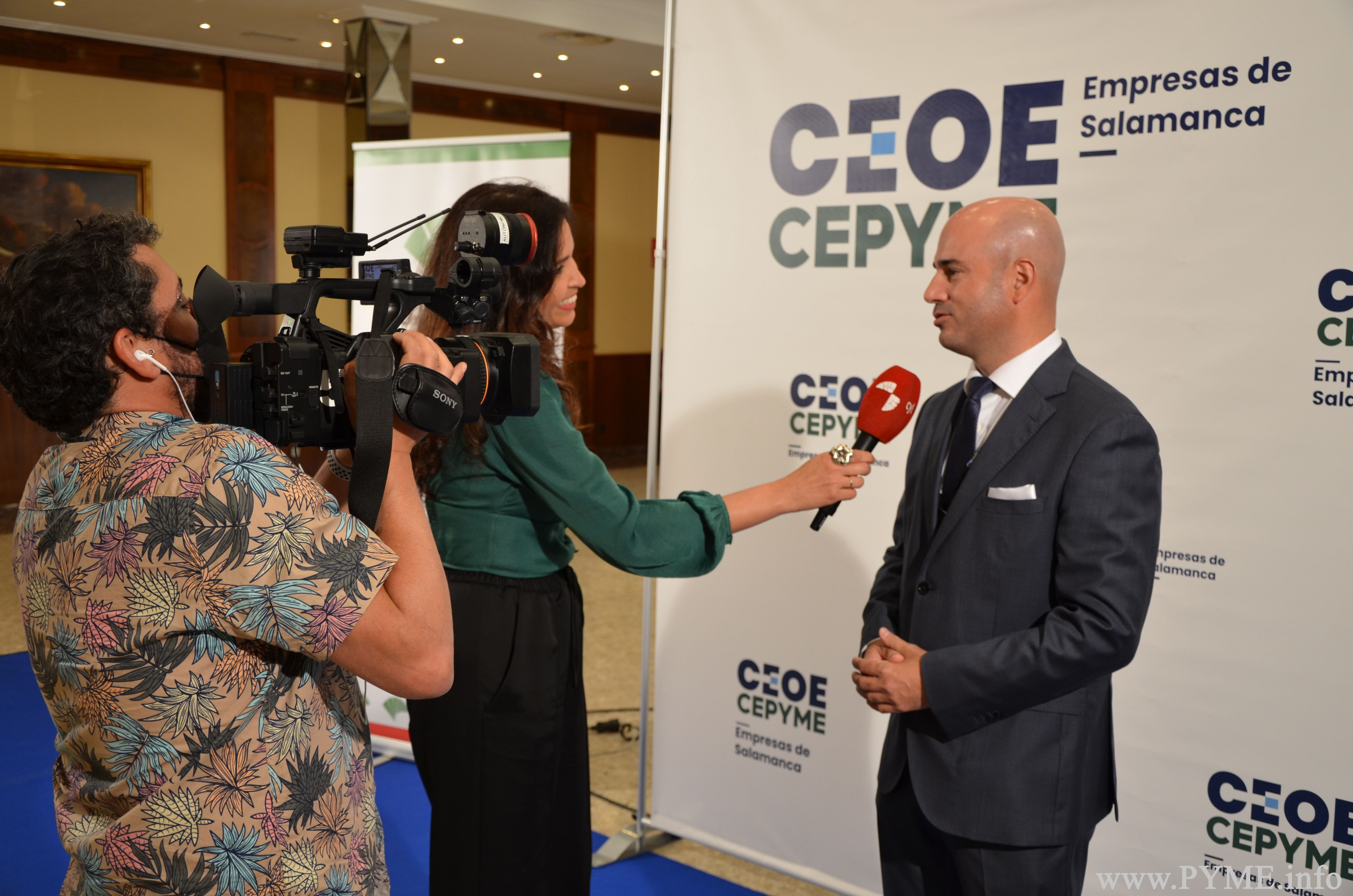
CyLTV reporters at a business awards ceremony in Salamanca in 2022

In late 2008, Juan Vicente Herrera, President of the Regional Government of Castile and León, announced the public tender for TDT in the region. The eventual operator announced ten production centres around the region – in the nine provincial capitals, and the other in the comarca of El Bierzo. The operator has two channels: one with region-wide programming, and the other with variation by province. These two channels began in March 2009 as La 7 and La 8, respectively.

Despite being a private company, CyLTV is subsidised by the Regional Government of Castile and León. In June 2025, it was assigned €47.9 million for the next two years.

In 2011, the company laid off employees due to Treasury demands that it pay €10.7 million in value-added tax on its subsidies from the regional government.

In October 2024, the company launched the online platform CyLTVplay, including an archive of over 500 series from 15 years of its history. It was launched by Jesús Julio Carnero, the mayor of Valladolid.
