= Adam Jezierski =

Polish-Spanish actor

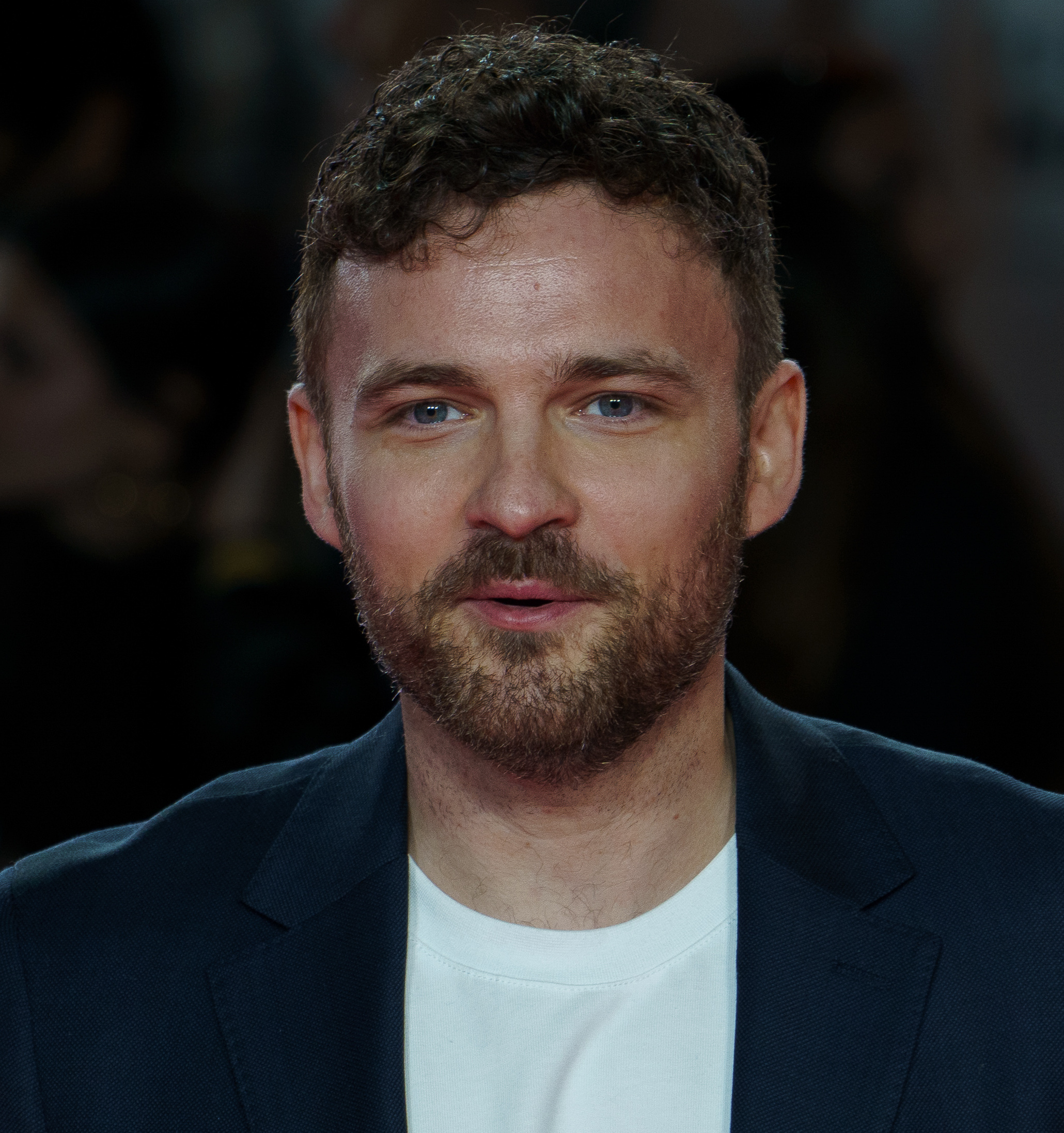
- Jezierski in 2025
- Born: Adam Jezierski Ros; 11 July 1990 (age 36); Warsaw, Poland
- Occupation: Actor
- Years active: 2003-present

Adam Jezierski Ros (born 11 July 1990) is a Polish-born actor based in Spain. He is known for playing lead role in the series Física o Química as Gorka Martínez Mora.

== Biography ==
Adam Jezierski was born on 11 July 1990 in Warsaw, Poland. His family moved to Madrid, Spain, when he was 7.

== Career ==
In 2003, Jezierski made his acting debut appearing in film Sueños, which won the Goya award for best shortfilm.

In 2004, he acted in the movie Siete.

In 2007, he makes a small participation in the television series Hospital Central and Cuéntame.

From 2008 to 2011, he was the protagonist of the youth television series Física o Química with Gonzalo Ramos, Leonor Martín, Angy Fernández, Javier Calvo, Úrsula Corberó, Andrea Duro, Karim El-Kerem, Maxi Iglesias, Sandra Blázquez, Nasser Saleh, Álex Martínez, Adrián Rodríguez, Miriam Giovanelli, Andrés Cheung, Óscar Sinela, Irene Sánchez, Álex Batllori, Lucía Ramos, Lorena Mateo and Álex Hernández. Jezierski's co–star Javier Calvo stated he considered the themes of the series "are problems that are also present in reality".

In 2009, he acted in the movie Fat People with Antonio de la Torre, Raúl Arévalo and Verónica Sánchez.

In 2010, Jezierski acted in the movies Tensión sexual no resuelta and Cruzado el límite.

From 2011 to 2012, he makes a small participation in the television series Cheers.

In 2013, he acted in the movie Blockbuster.

In 2015, Jezierski makes a small participation in the television Web series Aula de castigo starring Álex Martínez, Leonor Martín, Lucía Delgado, Ricardo Bascuñán, Markos Marín and Lorenzo Ayuso and he is also the Casting Director of the series.

In 2020, it is confirmed that the actor will give life to Gorka Martínez Mora in Física o Química: El reencuentro for the platform Atresplayer Premium.

== Filmography ==
=== Movies ===
Year	Movie	Character	Director	Notes
2003	Sueños		Daniel Guzmán	Short film
2004	Siete		Arturo Ruiz Serrano	Short film
2009	Gordos (Fat People)	Luis	Daniel Sánchez Arévalo	
2010	Tensión sexual no resuelta	Nicolás "Nico" Vidal	Miguel Ángel Lamata	
2010	Cruzando el límite	Migue	Xavi Giménez	
2010	Animales domésticos	Dani		
2011	Turno de noche	Pablo	Carlos Ruano	Short film
2011	Verbo	Foco	Eduardo Chapero-Jackson	
2012	Vado Permanente			Short film
2013	Mighty Boy	Jaime	Javier Yañez Sanz	Short film
2013	Tres 60	Ruso	Alejandro Ezcurdia	
2013	Blockbuster	Miguel	Tirso Calero	
2017	Aprieta pero raramente ahoga	Daniel	David Pérez Sañudo	Short film
2018	Jefe	Charly	Sergio Barrejón	

=== Television ===
Year	Title	Character	Channel	Notes
2007	Cuéntame cómo pasó	Santi	La 1	2 episodes
2007	Hospital Central	Antonio Almenara	Telecinco	1 episode
2008-2011	Física o Química	Gorka Martínez Mora	Antena 3	52 episodes
2011	Ángel o demonio	Jonás	r owspan="2"|Telecinco	1 episode
2011-2012	Cheers	Yuri Semionov	7 episodes	
2012-2014	Con el culo al aire	Javier "Javi" Colmenarejo Díaz	Antena 3	36 episodes
2013	Tormenta	Leo	Antena 3	2 episodes
2015	Aula de castigo	Rubén Moreira López	Vimeo	Casting Director
2015-2016	Gym Tony	Cristian	Cuatro	170 episodes
2016	Paquita Salas		Flooxer	1 episode
2017	La peluquería	Andrés	La 1	118 episodes
2017	Gym Tony LC	Cristian	Factoría de Ficción	60 episodes
2019	Vota Juan	Víctor Sanz	TNT España	8 episodes
2020	Vamos Juan	Víctor Sanz	TNT España	3 episodes
2020-2021	Física o Química: El reencuentro	Gorka Martínez Mora	Atresplayer Premium	2 episodes
2021-2022	Venga Juan	Víctor Sanz	HBO Max	5 episodes
2021-present	Amar es para siempre	Melicarpo Medina	Antena 3	243 episodes
2022	Señor, dame paciencia	Goyito Zaldívar Ramos	Antena 3	8 episodes

=== Television Programs ===
Year	Program	Channel	Notes
2018	Your Face Sounds Familiar	Antena 3	Guest

=== Videoclips ===
Year	Artist	Song
2008	Despistaos	Física o química

== Awards and nominations ==
Year	Award	Category	Work	Result
2020	Feroz Awards	Best Supporting Actor	Vota Juan	Nominated
2022	Feroz Awards	Best Supporting Actor	Venga Juan	Nominated
