= Física o Química =

- Also known as: FoQ
- Genre: Drama
- Created by: Carlos Montero
- Developed by: Jaime Vaca; Carlos Ruano; Félix Jiménez Velando; Alberto Manzano; Kilian Delgado; Mario Parra; María López Castaño; Susana López Rubio; José Luis V. Baringo; Mikel Alvariño; Jessica Pires; Sara Vicente
- Directed by: Javier Quintas; Iñaki Mercero; Juanma R. Pachón; Carlos Navarro; Luis Santamaría; Alexandra Graf
- Starring: Gonzalo Ramos; Leonor Martín; Angy Fernández; Javier Calvo; Úrsula Corberó; Andrea Duro; Karim El-Kerem; Maxi Iglesias; Adam Jezierski; Sandra Blázquez; Álex Martínez; Nasser Saleh; Adrián Rodríguez; Miriam Giovanelli; Nuria González; Cecilia Freire; Ana Milán; Bart Santana; Blanca Romero; Fele Martínez; Michel Brown; Sabrina Garciarena; Olivia Molina; Sergio Mur; Fernando Andina; Enrique Arce; Juan Pablo Di Pace; Marc Clotet; Andrés Cheung; Joaquín Climent; Michel Gurfi; Xavi Mira; Óscar Sinela; José Manuel Seda; Álex Barahona; Irene Sánchez; Álex Batllori; Cristina Alcázar; Lucía Ramos; Lorena Mateo; Álex Hernández
- Opening theme: "Los días" by Cinco de Enero (season 1) "Física o química" by Despistaos (seasons 2–4) "Física o química" by El Sueño de Morfeo (season 5) "Física o química" by Angy Fernández (season 6) "Física o química" by Despistaos (season 7)
- Composers: Joaquín Peña; Julio de la Rosa
- Country of origin: Spain
- Original language: Spanish
- No. of seasons: 7
- No. of episodes: 77 (list of episodes)

Production
- Executive producers: Reyes Baltanás; Iñaki Mercero
- Producer: Adrián Lorente León
- Cinematography: Antonio González Méndez; Macari Golferichs; Antonio Prieto; Javier Cerdá
- Running time: 80 minutes (approx.)
- Production company: Ida y Vuelta Producciones

Original release
- Network: Antena 3
- Release: 4 February 2008 – 13 June 2011

Related
- Relaciones peligrosas

Física o Química (English: "Physics or Chemistry") is a Spanish drama television series produced by Ida y Vuelta Producciones for Antena 3 that was originally broadcast from 4 February 2008 to 13 June 2011. In this series they talked about topics such as: drug abuse, suicide, racism, domestic violence, rape, sex, virginity, pregnancy, homosexuality, anorexia nervosa, bulimia nervosa, cheating, forced marriage, same-sex marriage, adoption, cancer, lack of self-confidence, death, homophobia, xenophobia, prostitution, unprotected sex and forbidden love.

A reunion miniseries titled Física o Química: El reencuentro premiered on 27 December 2020 on Atresplayer Premium. A Russian adaptation of part of the series, with 20 episodes, was aired in 2011.

== Synopsis ==
A group of novice teachers begin to teach at an institute, the Zurbarán. Students seek their place in the world. Who said that teaching was easy? The series revolves around the world of teaching. The novelty is given by the point of view: the viewer sees through the eyes of some novice teachers, young individuals, newcomers to a secondary school and their fears, doubts and fears before their new work as educators. The arrival of these teachers will reveal to us a whole universe of conflicts, loves, heartbreaks, illusions and hopes of a group of boys and girls and the people around them.

== Cast ==
=== Students ===
- Yolanda "Yoli" Freire Caballar (Andrea Duro) Better known as the "Zorra Poligonera" due to her debauched demeanor. She is proud of the neighborhood where she is from and she likes sex. Her first love is Isaac; after his death, she goes out with Quino, Julio and Román. She is the victim of two rapes, the first by a classmate, Oliver, and later by Julio's father who scams her by saying that if she has sex with him, he will erase her brother Berto's police record. Yoli's best friends are Cova, Paula, Ruth and Fer, with whom she has a very close friendship and had a relationship with, and she almost got pregnant with Fer. Her strong friendship with Ruth makes her forgive her for her cheating with Román. She starts a relationship with Salva. (seasons 1–7)
- Fernando "Fer" Redondo Ruano (Javier Calvo) At the beginning of the series, he was Rubén's best friend, Julio's brother. He is the best friend of Cova, Julio and Yoli. He is gay, and at first he was in love with Rubén and then with Julio without being reciprocated. His first boyfriend is named Hugo, although the relationship is brief for betraying his trust. But then he meets the great love of his life, David, with whom he forms a partnership for the story. At first, they see each other secretly but then their relationship becomes public. Sometime later they separate because of David's deceptions and Fer's jealousy and distrust. Then he begins to go out with Borja, whom he is about to marry, but David interrupts the wedding and reconciles with Fer, who had never stopped loving him. They are going to live together but have another crisis due to some misunderstandings between them. Fer realizes that his jealousy only manages to ruin their relationship and regrets his behavior. He dies due to an accident with a shotgun. (seasons 1–7)
- Paula Blasco Prieto (Angy Fernández) She is the sister of Isaac and the best friend of Cova and Yoli. At the beginning of the series she likes Cabano, but her first boyfriend will be Jan, until he cheats on her and they break up. Afterwards, she is with Cabano for a while but the relationship does not end well, especially when Alma gets in the way and the three of them have a threesome. After the summer, she wants to go back to Cabano, but the fact of not getting it makes her console herself with Gorka and have sex with him and she becomes pregnant with Gorka. She decides to have the child, she does not want Gorka to take over the responsibilities and unexpectedly ends up falling in love with Gorka. When the child, Isaac, is born, Gorka leaves, but eventually returns and they leave together. She began to audition to be a singer and went on tour. (seasons 1–7)
- Ruth Gómez Quintana (Úrsula Corberó) She loses her parents in a car accident and Clara becomes her legal guardian. She has self-esteem issues. She was Isaac's girlfriend, but he left her for Irene. Later she is Gorka's girlfriend. Despite being very hung up with him, she feels that the relationship does not suit her. For a time she is with Cabano, but ends up returning with Gorka. Then she has bulimia problems that mean that she is admitted to a center all summer. After the summer she goes back to Cabano and helps him when he has cancer. Román's arrival creates a rapprochement, and he leaves Cabano when he leaves. For a while she and Román go out together until she goes to study design in Barcelona. In the last episode she sends a video to everyone, where she appears with Cabano in Barcelona. (seasons 1–7)
- Julio de la Torre Reig (Gonzalo Ramos) In the first episode his brother, Rubén, commits suicide and he wants to investigate what happened. Their father abandoned them when they were little and their mother lives in England, therefore he is always alone. He falls in love with Cova, his ex-sister-in-law and they have a relationship, he lost his virginity with Cova and after having sex without a condom, Cova discovers that she is pregnant and hides it from Julio, later they discover that she was not really pregnant and both suffer a Pregnancy scare, they end their relationship because of their insecurities. He becomes a friend of a Nazi and starts dating Lucía, his sister. He goes through a very troublesome time that even causes him to be expelled from the institute. He leaves the gang of neo-Nazis when they want to beat up Fer and he defends him. Later he will go out with Violeta. He will have a relationship with Yoli, until his father reappears and intervenes. He had an interest in Teresa until he discovers the plot with Álvaro. The return of Cova to Zurbarán leads him to resume his relationship with Cova since he was always in love with Cova. Julio tells Cova that he has to go with his mother to England in a month. Julio and Cova have sex at Paula's house while they both take care of Isaac, Gorka and Paula's son. Cova and Julio have sex at Paula's house while they both take care of Isaac, Gorka and Paula's son. Cova takes Julio to the park where they had sex for the first time together, when Julio and Cova are talking in the park, Julio tells Cova that what happened at Paula's house was not a mistake, his only mistake was letting her go, and Julio tells Cova that if she had been pregnant he would not have cared, because he knows that they would have been great parents. Before going with Cova to Alicante, David tells Julio that Cova has a boyfriend in Alicante, Cova tells Julio that she left her boyfriend after having sex with him. Julio goes to live with Cova in Alicante. (seasons 1–7)
- Covadonga "Cova" Ariste Espinel (Leonor Martín) She is the class delegate, she is very ecologist, hippie, bohemian and very mature for her age, is what differentiates her from the rest, being in many cases a leader for the rest of her peers. She is always defending lost causes. Her best friends are Paula, Yoli, Fer, Ruth and Julio. She was Rubén's girlfriend. She falls in love with Julio, her ex-brother-in-law and they have a relationship, with whom she has sex and after having sex without a condom, Cova discovers that she is pregnant and hides it from Julio, later they discover that she was not really pregnant and both suffer a Pregnancy scare, they end their relationship because of their insecurities. When Julio breaks up with her, she is increasingly concerned about Julio's Nazi companies. She moves to live in Alicante with her parents, because her father was given a job there. She returns for the birth of Isaac, the son of Gorka and Paula. When Gorka flees, he stays at Cova's house. The return of Cova to Zurbarán leads her to resume her relationship with Julio. Cova and Julio have sex at Paula's house while they both take care of Isaac, Gorka and Paula's son. Cova takes Julio to the park where they had sex for the first time together, when Julio and Cova are talking in the park, Julio tells Cova that what happened at Paula's house was not a mistake, his only mistake was letting her go, and Julio tells Cova that if she had been pregnant he would not have cared, because he knows that they would have been great parents. Cova had a boyfriend in Alicante, Cova left her boyfriend after having sex with Julio and after realizing that she still loves Julio. When she goes back to Alicante, Julio goes with her. (seasons 1–3; 5–7)
- Gorka Martínez Mora (Adam Jezierski) He is a very conflictive student, who is always in trouble and annoying his classmates. He gets to make very practical jokes to Jan and Fer. He goes out with Ruth, but he humbles her in such a way that they always end up leaving the relationship. His best friend is Cabano, but he fights with him when he finds out that he is dating Ruth, whom he calls "Mi rubia". He is about to change and stop being such a bad person when he discovers that he has got Paula pregnant. He decides to take care of the child and ends up falling in love with her. He has problems with the law for beating up a boy who ran over Paula and who almost lost the child. When he is accused of having drugged Teresa at a party, he decides to temporarily disappear to avoid jail. He returns when all this problem has been solved and for the birth of his son Isaac. Problems as a parent make him leave again. When he meets Paula again, he confesses that he left because Dolores, Paula's mother, was making his life impossible and they end up reconciling. (seasons 1–7)
- César Cabano de Vera (Maxi Iglesias) He is the "handsome" boy from high school who is followed by many girls, like Paula, at the beginning of the series he liked Paula but as she starts dating Jan he begins to fall in love with Ruth. He has many problems at home because his father mistreats his mother. When his father abandons them, he has to look for work, coming to work on sex pages on the internet. His best friend is Gorka, but they get into a fight when he starts dating Ruth. They break up when she tells him that she is still in love with Gorka. He begins dating Paula, but mostly because he feels guilty about Isaac's death. Alma tries to "help" her with her relationship with Paula, but after having a threesome she makes everything end badly. After the summer, go back to Ruth. Shortly after, he discovers that he has testicular cancer, but manages to overcome this disease. He goes to India for a few months and comes back to see life differently. He says he wants to dedicate himself to football. They end up signing him for a team from England. He ends his relationship with Ruth. In the last episode Ruth sends a video to everyone, where she appears with Cabano in Barcelona. (seasons 1–5; 7)
- Isaac Blasco Prieto (Karim El-Kerem) He is Paula's brother. He falls in love with Irene and has a relationship before she is his teacher. When he sees her teaching classes, their relationship will continue in secret. For a while he is with Yoli, but he leaves her because he still likes Irene. It will be discovered, but he blames himself for being readmitted to the center. He is about to resume his relationship with her. Isaac dies in a quad accident, preventing Cabano from crashing into him. (seasons 1–2)
- Alma Núñez Fontevilla (Sandra Blázquez) She comes to the center hiding something serious from her past. Even Ruth discovers that her academic record has been empty for the past eight years. She tries to invent a thousand stories, until the truth is discovered: she has been in a reformatory for having participated in the death of a girl. She gets in the way of Paula and Cabano, she even has a threesome with them. Later she will fixate on Roque so that he can paint her naked, make her leave work and sleep with him and then despise him. Then she befriends Quino and by teaching him skills with the girls she is attracted to him, but the boy leaves the institute. For a time the gang doesn't talk to her, and she befriends Teresa. She falls in love with Álvaro but leaves him when she finds out what he did to Teresa. However, she continues to see him secretly while he goes out with Teresa. When everything is discovered, a great feud with Teresa begins. He repeats year after year to raise his grades and go to study in the United States. She prostitutes herself in order to get the money she needs for the scholarship. Álvaro does everything possible to make Alma stop prostitution. Alma is approved for the scholarship after obtaining the necessary bond to go to the United States, but decides to stay to take care of Álvaro after being hospitalized for steroid abuse. (seasons 3–7)
- David Ferrán Quintanilla (Adrián Rodríguez) He is Julio's best friend from childhood. Through Julio he meets Fer and begins to feel attracted to him. At first he tries to suppress his desires for fear of accepting himself as gay, but then he realizes that he has really fallen in love with Fer. Finally he decides to come out of the closet in front of his friends and his parents, which costs him a lot. Their relationship goes through bad times when he starts chatting with a stranger who doesn't stop harassing him, and later they break up due to Fer's distrust. For a while he likes Jorge, but he doesn't get to have anything serious with him. He suffers a crisis when Fer is about to marry Borja and tries to commit suicide but Jorge stops him and makes him reconsider. Finally he appears at Fer and Borja's wedding and tells Fer everything he feels for him, both reconciling with a kiss in the rain. They move in together and go through another separation when he meets Susana again, an ex-girlfriend he dreams of at night. Finally he finds the explanation to these dreams and admits to Fer that he is bisexual. After going through several crises, he gives up and decides to leave Fer since his constant attacks of jealousy and doubts damage the relationship. (seasons 3–7)
- Rashid "Román" Lorente Arco (Nasser Saleh) His real name is Rashid and he is welcomed into Clara's house. His mother has been in jail and deals in drugs because he needs money for his grandfather, who is taking care of his little brothers. When everything is discovered, his brothers are transferred to a reception center. At first, he does not have a very good relationship with Ruth, but he will fall in love with her. Later he starts dating Yoli, but he cheats on her with Ruth. His relationship with Ruth ends when Clara leaves for Argentina and Ruth for Barcelona. Shares a flat with Fer and David. During the summer he has an approach with Teresa in the chat, when the course begins, she ignores him, but she will help him with the problems he has and between them something more than friendship will emerge between them. He starts a relationship with Teresa. (seasons 5–7)
- Salvador "Salva" Quintanilla (Álex Martínez) Salva is a serious boy, who interacts little with the rest and loves to write poems, this makes it completely different from the rest of its peers and that it stands out for it. At certain times he is the victim of ridicule for his way of being. He is a very shy and simple boy, which makes everyone think that he is homosexual, but he really is in love with Daniela, in order to be her best friend, he does not deny the rumor, when everything is discovered, he loses his friendship with Daniela and Jon. Daniela decides for him, but after Jon's accident, regrets cause them to end up leaving him. For a time he is the victim of practical jokes from Jon and Álvaro for spying on the girls in the locker room, including Daniela and Yoli. He overcomes these bad moments by making friends with Yoli and Fer, who will help him. He manages to forget Daniela and he likes Yoli more and more. He starts a relationship with Yoli. (seasons 6–7)
- Antonio "Toño" Aramillo (Víctor Palmero) He's a guy who wanted to be just as cool as his friends but they wouldn't let him. Out of his mind, feeling like a nobody and in a panic Toño loses his papers and does not hesitate to take a shotgun from his father in order to scare and teach Jon and Álvaro a lesson, who were making his life impossible. But unfortunately everything gets complicated and he ends up killing Fer by accident. The police detain him but it is not known what happens to him later, surely being a minor he was locked up in a juvenile prison or a psychiatric hospital. (season 7)
- Teresa Parra Lebrón (Lucía Ramos) She has grown overprotected by her father, thinking that her mother died. She discovers that his mother is Verónica shortly after she arrives at Zurbarán. She goes out very little with her friends, until Álvaro invites her to a party he's having. At this party they drug her and she ends up having sex with Julio, who had also been drugged without knowing it. With the help of Alma and Paula she ends up discovering that the culprit was Álvaro. After a while she forgives Álvaro and they start dating, until she discovers that he was cheating on her with Alma. During the following course he intends to make life impossible for him, in addition to totally changing his attitude, making out every day with a different boy; He eventually shatters Alma's self-esteem and confidence when he steals the money she made through prostitution. She makes very good friends with Román, who will help her put aside so much resentment with Alma. She starts a relationship with Salva. (seasons 5–7)
- Daniela Vaquero Castiñeira (Lorena Mateo) She is Vaquero's sister and arrives mid-year after having been in boarding school, so she can keep her mother company after her father's death. His arrival is a bit bumpy because they mistakenly think that he has AIDS and they make life impossible for him, until everything clears up. When she meets Jon, she hooks up with him, while becoming best friends with Salva, thinking he's gay. When he discovers that Salva is really in love with her and that Jon does not respect him enough, he decides not to want to know anything about either of them, but he ends up deciding on Salva, which coincides with Jon falling down the stairs, and causes to leave the relationship. In the last season Daniela becomes the witch and hateful of the school; she intimidates her friends and fights Yoli for being the class delegate. When he discovers that Enrique wants to sell the school, nobody believes her. (seasons 5–7)
- Violeta Cortés Calvo (Irene Sánchez) She is Irene's niece and she arrives after escaping from a residence because her classmates made her life impossible. Fake a depression to enroll in the Zurbarán. Has a fat complex. She makes life impossible for Irene even though she has welcomed her into her home because she doesn't like her aunt's way of life and wants her to change for the better. Violeta is very fond of the internet, horror movies and video games. She likes Julio very much and they quickly become very close friends, despite the fact that he was initially ashamed of her because of her physique. She is the creator of "Ciber Zurbarán", a virtual school that becomes very popular among all students. Later, her mother discovers that she has sex with Julio and thinks that she is out of control and takes her out of school and takes her away from Madrid to put her in boarding school. (seasons 3–4)
- Joaquín "Quino" Domínguez Palma (Óscar Sinela) He is a Christian Evangelist. He always goes with the guitar and his dream is to be a singer. He is half Venezuelan. His father abandoned him and his mother as soon as they returned to Spain. He arrives at the institute in the middle of the year and falls in love with Yoli. His love for her causes him to give up a role in a Nacho Cano musical. He wants to get married a virgin, which makes his relationship with Yoli not work. His distrust causes Alma to help him overcome the insecurities he has. He loses his virginity to Alma and secretly brings alcohol to the end-of-year party, knowing it was forbidden. When they discover him, he is expelled from the center and goes to try his luck in the world of music. In the end he manages to record a CD. (seasons 3–4)
- Jan Taeming (Andrés Chueng) He is very good at drawing. When he arrives at Zurbarán, Gorka and Cabano make life impossible for him. He likes Paula and is dating her for a while. His parents force him to marry his cousin, so that she can obtain permanent residence in Spain, and he ends up cheating on Paula with her. This causes them to break up and shortly after he goes to China. (seasons 1–2; 7)
- Álvaro Soler (Álex Batllori) He is a good student, very pressured by his father. He is the one who sets up the party where someone drugs Teresa. It is finally discovered that he was the culprit. He likes Alma, but this discovery makes Alma leave him and everyone turns their back on him. He meets Alma secretly, while Teresa forgives him and begins a relationship with her. When everything is discovered, he is left alone again and dedicates himself, together with Jon, to making life impossible for some classmates, such as Salva or Toño, who is the one who tries to kill him in high school with a shotgun. After this he starts taking anabolics, which will make him end up in a coma. Upon waking up frontera the coma, he tells Alma that he loves her and they are back together. (seasons 5–7)
- Jon (Álex Hernández) He has an accident after jumping into a pool from a balcony that left him in a wheelchair, although out of shame he says it was a motorcycle accident, but at no time does he want people to feel sorry for him. He arrives at the institute and immediately there is a rapprochement between him and Daniela at a party. He befriends Salva, but the friendship will be broken when he discovers that he also likes Daniela. After a fight with him that makes him roll down the stairs and has him in a coma for a whole summer, he becomes his enemy and begins to make life impossible for him with Álvaro. When Toño, another boy he was bullying, appears at the institute with a shotgun ready to kill him, he makes up with all his friends. Jon later reveals that the motorcycle accident was a lie and that his immobility was due to wanting to be cool and having jumped into a pool from the second floor, a madness that ended in tragedy. (seasons 6–7)

=== Zurbarán School staff ===
Olimpia Díaz Centeno (Ana Milán) She is the English teacher. She is very hard on students and has no sympathy with them or with too many teachers for being too inflexible at times. At the beginning of the series she is married to Félix, but the marriage separates when she cheats on him with Roque and becomes pregnant without knowing from whom. She takes Clara out of the school management and she is the principal until Martín arrives. When her son, Darío, was born, her relationship with Roque had already ended. She performs paternity tests on Darío, and the baby's father turns out to be Félix. Later she has a short relationship with David's father, not knowing that he was still married. She has a relationship with Martín, with whom she bought a house. After her relationship with Martín. She begins a relationship, not very serious, with Vaquero. She likes Enrique, but the relationship stops when she discovers that he wants to sell the school. (seasons 1–7)

- Clara Yáñes Mediavilla (Nuria González) At the beginning of the series she is the director of Zurbarán. When Ruth's parents die, she takes over as a legal guardian. Later, Olimpia takes her position away and becomes head of studies when Adolfo leaves. He is always very aware of the students and the rest of the teachers, despite the fact that for a season he has a depression that causes him to lower his self-esteem due to a threat from a group of Nazis. She decides to adopt a child, but social services informs her that due to her age, she has no chance of receiving a baby. Later, she welcomes 16-year-old Román into her home. She leaves school to go to Argentina with Ricardo. (seasons 1–7)
- Blanca Román Hernández (Cecilia Freire) She is the Literature teacher and begins to work at the center, at first with many insecurities. She also shows many insecurities with her relationships with men. She likes Jonathan, but overcomes her fears with Mario, Irene's ex-boyfriend. He shares a flat with Irene, and this brings problems, especially when she falls in love with Miguel and sees that he likes Irene. When she teaches Berto, they start a relationship, which she has at the same time as with Martín. Berto and Martín, the two ask her hand in marriage, and after many doubts she decides for Martín. She is going to New York after Martín planted her at the altar on her wedding day. She returned to Spain and changed schools. In the last chapter she appears with Berto. (seasons 1–4; 7)
- Irene Calvo Azpeolea (Blanca Romero) She begins to work in the first episode as a philosophy teacher, she is liberal and cultured. On the first day of class, she discovers that during the summer she had a one-night stand with a student, Isaac. This relationship continues in secret, even Clara and Adolfo discover it, which makes her stop being a teacher for a while. When she returns, her relationship with Isaac is over. For a time she is with Miguel, but a possible return with Isaac and the subsequent death of the student is interposed. Months later she meets Thomas, the American English teacher who has been working for a time at the center, with whom she begins a relationship full of ups and downs. During the summer they get married in Las Vegas. She doesn't take it seriously because she doesn't get used to the idea of always being with the same man. They have a severe crisis, but finally she goes to the United States to finish homologate her marriage. At the end of the series, Irene appears pregnant with Thomas. (seasons 1–4; 7)
- Roque Madrona Castro (Bart Santana) He is the art teacher. He is Adolfo's son and at first they don't have a very good relationship. He has a young daughter, Alba, with his ex-wife Leonora, from whom he separated due to her mental instability. Leo comes between him and Olympia. During a summer vacation, Roque got involved with Alma, who inspired him to paint his pictures. Alma harasses him for a while and when Roque gives in, she gets fed up with the game and ends the relationship. Because of this, Roque starts using drugs to help him work. For a few months he is in rehab. He shows interest in Marina, who does not let the relationship advance for fear of trusting her secret. Roque leaves the Zurbarán to go to London to take care of his daughter. (seasons 1–5)
- Vicente Vaquero Castiñeira (Marc Clotet) He is 30 years old. He is the professor of Physical Education. He's a bit immature. He enters the Zurbarán by management of his father, who owns the school. He insists that Vicente is a playboy, unsuccessful and good for nothing, and he gets him the job to see if his son is looking for life. He becomes too friendly with the students, which the rest of the teachers advise against. His father dies after a fight with him that affected his heart. Vicente, by inheritance, becomes the majority shareholder of the school. At first he likes Irene, but when she leaves he hooks up with Verónica, with whom he will maintain a three-way relationship with Berto, until he leaves. For a time he is with Olimpia. After the summer, he married Sara, an Argentine whom he met at a summer camp, so that she could legally stay in Spain. At the end of the series they deport Sara, and Vicente, goes with her to Argentina. (seasons 4–7)
- Verónica Lebrón Cervantes (Olivia Molina) She arrives at the institute to teach literature classes, but also looking for her daughter, Teresa, whom she abandoned when she was little. She is very liberal, which will bring her problems with Luis, Teresa's father, with her daughter, and with other teachers due to her bad example. For a time she has a relationship with Berto and Vaquero at the same time. When the trio is over, a relationship with Jorge begins full of ups and downs. After the breakup, Xavi moves to her apartment, and although he likes Sara, a relationship emerges between them that is consolidated. (seasons 5–7)
- Arturo Ochando Villalba (Enrique Arce) He is a doctor and goes to work at the center as a professor of Biology after having problems with the law for being accused of having euthanized his wife, who died of cancer. Despite having doubts about whether he was guilty or innocent of having killed his wife. He confesses that he felt unable to do anything to her. He starts a relationship with Marina. (seasons 6–7)
- Xavier "Xavi" López (Juan Pablo Di Pace) He is the art teacher who is installed in Verónica's house. He's rebellious, funny, and a stoner. He leaves his apartment, which he sublets to David and Fer to go live with Verónica. Xavi is in a relationship with Sara. He starts a relationship with Verónica. (season 7)
- Enrique Lubián (Fernando Andina) He arrives as director after Martín's departure. He is a friend of Vaquero's family. He invested in the institute to resell it and tear it down, which was not revealed until the last episode. He is posh, arrogant, fascist, racist and homophobic, he never gets to like the students or the teachers. Enrique's affection is reserved solely for his dog, Frida. He showed interest in Olimpia and was about to start a relationship with her, but Olimpia stops him when she discovers his true intentions. The series ends with Enrique wondering whether or not to sign the sale of the Zurbarán. (season 7)
- Miguel Belaza (Michel Brown) He is Argentinian. He comes to the center as a technology teacher and also to give a theater workshop. He shares a flat with Irene and Blanca, between whom a love triangle will be created. In the past, he lost his wife in an accident that also killed children on a school bus, causing him to receive threats for a time. At the end of the second season he leaves because he cannot decide between Blanca and Irene. (season 2)
- Sara Pires (Sabrina Garciarena) She is Argentinian. She is Vaquero's wife, she marries him to obtain a residence permit in Spain. She starts working as a Philosophy teacher and starts a relationship with Xavi. When the immigration officers discover that her marriage to Vaquero was a fraud, they deport her to Argentina, but before leaving, Vaquero tells her that he loves her and he goes with her to Argentina. (season 7)
- Jorge (Sergio Mur) He comes to the center as a counselor and later is the art teacher when Roque leaves. He is bisexual. At first there is a rapprochement between him and David, but he decides to distance himself when he knows that he is staying as a teacher. He goes to live at Verónica's house and ends up falling in love with her, but after the holidays he leaves her for another, and that makes him leave both the apartment and the institute. (seasons 5–6)
- Adolfo Madrona Bermúdez (Joaquín Climent) He is the head of studies. He has a very good relationship with the teachers, but not so good with his son. On a couple of occasions it denotes his attraction to Irene. His marriage breaks down when he falls in love with Loli, the mother of Paula and Isaac. This relationship falls apart after Isaac's death. Adolfo tries to get back to his wife, but she falls in love with another man. He has problems with the shareholders because of an article he publishes, and, due to this fact, his position at the school begins to be in danger. Despite being offered the post of director of Zurbarán, he takes early retirement and, thanks to Martín, he begins to write a book. (seasons 1–4; 7)
- Félix Alonso Arenes (Xavi Mira) He is the music teacher and the husband of Olimpia. He divorces Olimpia when he discovers that she has cheated on him with Roque and the child he is expecting may not be his. He ends up leaving high school because it is very difficult for him to see her every day. When Darío is born, he turns out to be his son, and he is willing to play the role of father. (seasons 1–3; 5; 7)
- Alberto "Berto" Freire Carballar (Álex Barahona) He is Yoli's brother and has been in jail. He works in the school as a waiter in the cafeteria, he will also be the football coach and maintenance man. As they ask him to graduate for work, he asks Blanca to help him with his studies. This makes them fall in love, but since Blanca decides to marry Martín, the relationship ends, even though he still likes her. When Blanca leaves, Berto starts dating Verónica. For a while she has a threesome with her and Vaquero, until she sees that this relationship is going nowhere and leaves. In the last chapter he appears with Blanca. (seasons 2–7)
- Martín Aguilar Novallas (José Manuel Seda) He is a professor of technology and a psychopedagogue. He joins the center as a member of the shareholders' meeting and soon becomes the director. He maintains a relationship with Blanca and they are about to get married, but at the altar he says no because he realizes that he likes Olimpia. Once with Olimpia, he discovers that he has impregnated a stripper with whom he had a sporadic relationship. This makes his relationship with Olimpia go cold. When they are ending the relationship, he receives the news that the girl, Maria, has been born and the mother has abandoned her. He decides to take care of her. He leaves the institute after resigning for having stolen the 6000 euros of the prize that Zurbarán received for winning the musical contest. (seasons 3–7)
- Jonathan Zafra (Michel Gurfi) He is the Physical Education teacher. He has a brief relationship with Blanca. He goes to Mexico for family reasons. (season 1)
- Marina Conde (Cristina Alcázar) She arrives at the institute to replace Irene as a Philosophy teacher. She has very conservative ideas, and is very reserved when it comes to interacting with men, especially with Roque. She is hiding a secret, her ex-boyfriend gave her HIV. She finally confesses it in front of everyone because they thought that Daniela had AIDS and they made her life impossible. She abandons teaching to occupy the position of councilor in her parents' town. She begins a relationship with Arturo. (seasons 5–7)

=== Recurring characters ===
- Mario Barrio (Fele Martínez) Irene's old boyfriend. He stays for a few days at the institute to do a report. He has sex with Blanca out of spite before leaving. (seasons 1–2)
- Marisa Castro (María Casal) She is Roque's mother and Adolfo's wife. She is an inspector of schools and institutes. She has a strong character, which makes her husband and son hide their personal problems from her. She divorces Adolfo after the cancer operation. She rebuilds her life with another man. (seasons 2–4)
- Leonor "Leo" Grandes Álvarez (Verónika Moral) She is the ex-wife of Roque and the mother of Alba, their daughter. She lived for five years in Belgium and returns to Zurbarán as a professor of philosophy. She is insecure, crazy and unhinged. She tricks Roque into sleeping with her, causing him to become distracted and not be aware of the class during the quad accident where Isaac lost his life. Leo leaves for the United States where she fails, returns to Spain and then moves to London. (seasons 2–3)
- Pablo Calleja (Pablo Espinosa) He is a friend of Julio and Cabano. At the end of the fourth season, Julio suspects that it was he who sneaked alcohol into the end-of-year party, but Pablo confesses that he was not and reports that the culprit was Quino. (seasons 3–4)
- Lucía Prieto (Miriam Giovanelli) She is Rodrigo's sister. She is a very manipulative person. She was Julio's girlfriend for a season and managed to turn him against all his friends. She was arrested along with her brother Rodrigo. (seasons 2–3)
- Luis Parra (Isak Férriz) He is Teresa's father and Verónica's ex-boyfriend. Verónica left them when they were both 16 years old. Luis raised Teresa alone, and is enraged when he finds out that Verónica is looking for her. He reproaches her lifestyle and does everything possible to keep Teresa away from her "slutty" mother. Teresa is taken to Seville, and she escapes and returns to Madrid alone. Finally, Luis agrees that Teresa spend a season with Verónica before reaching the age of majority. (seasons 5–6)
- Erica (Aura Garrido) She is Alma's best friend from childhood. Erica is mentally unbalanced. Alma and Erica inadvertently caused the drowning death of another girl who wanted to join them. Alma had to change her life to escape the experience. Erica, manages to find Alma and turn her friends against her. He plays mind games with the Zurbarán boys and tries to assassinate Alma and Paula by setting the school on fire. In the end she was arrested for terrorism. (season 3)
- Andrés (Diego Domínguez) He is a troubled boy, who has serious problems with Álvaro and frequently abuses Salva. (season 6)
- Frida (Cook) It's Enrique's dog. It is extremely spoiled. She does not like Olimpia, who accidentally runs over her, and the dog bites Olimpia. (season 7)
- Rubén de la Torre Reig (Julio Soler Vargas) He is Julio's younger brother. Rubén admired his older brother because he saw him as everything he was not, popular, athletic, sure of himself. He was Cova's boyfriend. He abandons his best friend Adrián González to his fate in a park after a drug overdose, he spent several months visiting him. When Adrián dies, Rubén's guilt is so great that he ends up committing suicide. Julio decides to seek the truth behind the events and suffers when he learns that his brother was about to rape a girl, but did not reach adulthood due to his friend's overdose. (season 1)
- Alonso de la Torre (Jaime Pujol) He is the father of Julio and Rubén and the father-in-law of Cova. He abandoned his two children and his wife 10 years ago. (seasons 4–5)
- Mr. César Cabano (Santiago Meléndez) He is Cabano's father. He is abusive and intimidating, he beats his son and his wife. He assaults Blanca. His wife divorces him and takes their son. Later he cuts off all financial support for both, causing Cabano to have to make a living doing illegal work for minors. (seasons 1–2)
- Lourdes de Vera (Andrea Guardiola) She is the mother of Cabano. (season 2; season 4)
- Dolores "Loli" Prieto Marcos (Teresa Arbolí) She is the mother of Paula and Isaac. She divorces her husband and starts dating Adolfo. Her relationship with Adolfo fails after Isaac's death. She does not support Paula in her desire to become a singer, and she is responsible for Gorka's disappearance and estrangement.(seasons 1–6)
- Oliver Navarro (Oliver Morellón) He is a classmate of the boys and friend of Gorka. He pretended to be gay to play a joke on Fer. Oliver is in the men's bathroom with Cova to help her find out what kind of drugs Fer used at the party he was with Hugo, even though Oliver thinks that Cova called him to have sex with him. He was the culprit of raping Yoli. He receives a beating from Berto who left him in the hospital. The conscience is so great that Oliver turns himself in to the police. Yoli makes him believe that she forgives him, but then tells him that she never would. (seasons 1–2)
- Rodrigo Prieto (Carlos Velasco Peinado) He is Lucía's brother. He is Julio's coach at the gym. He befriends him, and turns him against all his friends. Rodrigo is the head of a gang of neo-Nazis and recruits Julio to adopt his way of thinking. The group sows terror in the city, hitting immigrants, homosexuals and people of other religions, including Quino. When he discovers that Julio is betraying him, he gives him a beating that leaves him in the hospital. Julio ambushes Rodrigo, causing him to be arrested. (seasons 2–3)
- Yolanda "Peque" Sánchez (Denise Maestre) She is a gypsy student who studies at Zurbarán without the permission of her parents, only with the consent of her brother. Although Olimpia does everything possible for her to continue studying, in the end she has to leave it at the will of her parents, who despite their very
- Antonio Blasco (Mario Vedoya) He is the father of Paula and Isaac. (season 2)
- Alba Madrona Grandes (Carmen Sánchez Lozano/Lucía Caraballo Fabelo) She is the daughter of Roque and Leo. She is in the custody of her mother who takes her around the world, manipulates her and treats her badly. Roque even tried to obtain her legal custody. Alba was about to consume her father's drugs, Clara realized it and saved her life. She has problems with her health that make Roque travel to be with her, in London. (seasons 2–4)
- Matilde Mora Mejía (Arantxa Aranguren) She is Gorka's mother, she overprotective of her son. Gorka is ashamed of her when she is present. To control Gorka, Zurbarán decides to hire Matilde as a cleaning lady and she accepts. (seasons 1–4)
- Thomas McDonald (Mark Schardan) He's American. He is shy, clumsy and reserved. He's the English teacher, he was hired by Martín to teach English to the teachers. He falls in love with Irene, but since she can't make up her mind, he takes a job as a stewardess for British Airways. He breaks up with Irene over the internet, later they return, and Thomas takes Irene to the United States for three months, where they get married. Irene proposes to him to have an open relationship, which she does not like. Then Thomas falls in love with another woman, but this relationship fails. In the end he returns with Irene and they return to the United States. In the last season it is discovered that Thomas and Irene will have a baby. (seasons 3–4)
- Dr. Javier Ferrán (Ángel Hidalgo) He is the father of David and the doctor of Darío, the son of Olimpia and Félix. Like his wife, he is extremely homophobic, he has a homosexual brother who he never talks about. (seasons 3–4)
- Dr. Eva Quintanilla (Amaia Lizarralde) She is mother of David. She is a doctor and used to travel to many conferences. Her absences were used by her husband to deceive her. She was very shocked at the coming out of the closet of her son, David. (seasons 4–6)
- Carmen Ruano (Paloma Gómez Núñez) She is the mother of Fer. (season 1; seasons 5–7)
- Mr. Taeming (Carlos Wu) Jan's Chinese father who owns a convenience store in town. (seasons 1–2)
- Hugo (Adrián Marín) He is a student of Zurbarán. He was Fer's first boyfriend and with whom Fer lost his virginity. Fer and him break up when Fer discovers that he has recorded a video of them while they were having sex and Fer calls him a pervert. (season 2)
- Marga (Susana Martins) She is the president of the Parents Association. She is quite nosy and arrogant, although she always wants the well-being of the Zurbarán students. (season 2)
- Xiaomei (Nancy Yao) She is Jan's cousin and wife. She comes to Spain to marry him and thus obtain residency. Jan leaves Paula believing that her cousin is crazy about him, but then she reveals that she slept with him to get pregnant because if she gave birth in Spain, she would automatically obtain residency. The marriage fails, however, both she and Jan returned to China. (season 2)
- Marta (Ximena Suárez) She is the Physical Education Teacher. Martín fires her when he hires Vaquero, the son of the school's main shareholder. (seasons 2–4)
- Andrea (Aída de la Cruz) She is a friend of Cabano, she is ill with cancer and she is going to be in charge of helping Cabano to be more optimistic when facing the disease. She dies of cancer. (season 4)
- Borja (Israel Rodríguez) Artist and sculptor. He is Fer's boyfriend during the sixth season. He hates David and doesn't like the attention Fer gives David. He proposes to Fer who accepts. During the wedding David shows up to stop the wedding and get Fer back. Although Fer doubts and tries to move on, Borja is the one who decides not to marry knowing that Fer cares for him but not the strong love he feels for David. (season 6)
- Adrián González He was Rubén's best friend, Julio's younger brother. He passes away after a drug overdose that left him in a coma for several months. (season 1)
- Laura She is a classmate of the boys at Zurbarán. She goes out with Gorka for a while, which makes Ruth jealous. She is particularly affected by Adolfo's disease. (seasons 1–3)
- Ana She is a girl who is a student at Zurbarán. She gets along very well with Yoli but not with Alma. (seasons 3–6)

=== Guest stars and cameos ===
- Adriana Torrebejano as Cristina.
- Marina Gatell as Sandra.
- Amparo Valle as Clara's mother.
- Nacho Cano as himself.
- El Sueño de Morfeo as themselves.
- Liz Solari and Tomás de las Heras as Carlota "Charlotte" Carresi and Gonzalo Torres respectively, from the show Champs 12.
- Ana Fernández García and Lucho Fernandez as Sandra Benedetti and Culebra respectively, in a crossover with the television series Los protegidos.
- Carmen Gutiérrez as Cristina Calvo Azpeolea, Violeta's mother and Irene's sister.
- Farah Hamed as Fátima Arco, Román's mother.
- Marina Andina as Cova's mother and Julio's mother-in-law.
- Luisa Ezquerra as Mother of Julio and Rubén and the mother-in-law of Cova.
- Isidoro Fernández as Ricardo Gómez, Father of Ruth.
- Despistaos as themselves.
- DJ Nano as himself.

== Deceased characters ==
Character	Actor/Actress	Death chapter	Cause
Rubén de la Torre Reig	Julio Soler Vargas	1x01	Suicide
Adrián González		1x01	Drug overdose
Ricardo Gómez and Ruth's mother	Isidoro Fernández and	1x04	Traffic collision
Isaac Blasco Prieto	Karim El-Kerem	2x14	Accident of ATV and Brain hemorrhage
Andrea	Aída de la Cruz	5x04	Cancer
Fernando "Fer" Redondo Ruano	Javier Calvo	7x05	Accidental firing of Shotgun

== Scenarios ==
=== Zurbarán High School ===
HS is where most of the drama takes part. The rooms, the cafeteria, the library, the hallways, the elevator, the teachers' room, the bathrooms... The building becomes the scenario for most of the interactions among students and teachers.

=== Teachers' house ===
The home of Irene (Blanca Romero) and Blanca (Cecilia Freire) is a flat always occupied by other teachers such as Miguel, (Michel Brown), Violeta (Irene Sánchez), or Irene's nephew. After this last one left, the free room was taken by Vaquero (Marc Clotet), who stays in the flat after Irene and Blanca finally leave.

Later on, Vaquero rents the free rooms Verónica (Olivia Molina) and Jorge (Sergio Mur). Because of the constant flirting going on between these two, Vaquero decides to leave the flat, to the couple, but after they break up, Jorge leaves too.

Currently the flat is shared by Verónica (Olivia Molina), Sara (Sabrina Garciarena) and Xavi (Juan Pablo Di Pace).

=== Other scenarios ===
The students' houses, restaurants and even the street are also scenarios used in this TV show.

== Episodes ==
=== Season 1 (2008) ===
No. overall	No. in season	Title	Original release date
1	1	"Cosas que hacer antes de estar muerto"	4 February 2008
Irene, a 27-year-old girl wakes up in her bed next to a boy much younger than her, whom she met the night before. Two days later, Irene starts her new job as a philosophy teacher at the Zubarán school and there she discovers that the young man she slept with is one of her students and is a minor. Blanca is another of the new teachers at the school. All her life she has wanted to be a teacher but she will soon discover that it is not easy to control the whole class. Especially when almost all the students laugh at her. Jonathan, the new physical education teacher, tries to help a student Rubén who has tried to commit suicide and continues with the idea. The head of studies discovers that his son is the new art teacher. Clara, the director of the center, has hired him behind his back.
2	2	"Sólo es sexo"	11 February 2008
At school, some boys organize a petting party at Cabano's house. They advertise it with posters in the school but none of the teachers know what it consists of, only that it is highly sexual. Blanca, the literature teacher, to interest the students in the subject of the class, tries to give them another point of view about Celestina, but without her intention the class turns into a debate about sex. The director finds out and offers Blanca to give the boys some talks about sex. Roque tries to motivate Jan to keep drawing since he is very good at what he does. And he also asks him to be encouraged to tell the girl that he likes how he feels about her.
3	3	"Daños colaterales"	18 February 2008
Irene visits the gynecologist because she feels slight discomfort and is diagnosed with a mild sexually transmitted disease. And the worst part is that she probably gave it to someone, maybe her student Isaac. You have to talk to him to convince him to have some tests. Blanca, after his frustrated attempt to have sex with the physical education teacher, proposes him a dinner and something else. She is hell-bent on getting out of a sexual encounter with the boy. Due to the involuntary accusation of Jan, the boys who harassed him, Gorka and Cabano plan to get revenge on the boy and they do it in a brutal way, humiliating him mercilessly. The art teacher, Roque, powerless in the face of this aggression, decides to confront the boys and physically threatens them.
4	4	"Hace falta valor"	25 February 2008
Irene arrives at school determined to resign despite Blanca's advice. Upon arrival, he discovers that Clara has not been able to read her resignation email due to a mysterious virus. After Ruth tells the whole class that she has seen Roque smoking at a party, he is forced by Adolfo to give his talk about drugs. Unintentionally, Fer gets turned on in the showers watching Julio, causing all of his classmates to laugh at him. After Gorka continues to insult him in class, Fer explodes in front of everyone and Irene. To help him, she calls some talks on homosexuality at the institute. Fer, not very happy with the idea of Irene, is forced to decide if he has the courage to be himself in front of his companions.
5	5	"El precio de la verdad"	10 March 2008
Blanca and Irene continue with their respective emotional problems. The photos that Isaac took of Irene with his cell phone have begun to circulate around the institute, so Isaac tries to stop their disclosure. Irene sees her job in danger because of those photos. Irene, to forget the boy and pushed by Blanca, stays with the one who was her last boyfriend, Mario. Ruth has been orphaned and Clara is forced to take her into her home and offers to keep her custody. But Ruth rejects her, she plans to go with her uncles and achieve emancipation soon. Ruth doesn't know that her uncles want nothing to do with her and that the only person she can count on is the director. Julio is still obsessed with the death of his brother. With the help of Fer, he tries to find out what led him to commit suicide. Everything leads them to Gorka but he refuses to give them any information. Julio then presses him in such a way that Gorka puts him before a truth that perhaps he does not want to know.
6	6	"Egoísmo razonable"	17 March 2008
Irene does not want to admit that she is jealous of seeing Isaac with Yoli. Yoli begins to have a strange behavior at school: she leaves the classes and disappears without giving explanations. Isaac, concerned, asks Irene to find out what is happening to his girlfriend. Ruth sees the open sky to emancipate herself, as she is fed up with the control that Clara has over her. But it is Clara herself who is designated to manage the money until Ruth is of legal age. Julio is especially aggressive and introverted, since he was about to learn the reason for his brother's suicide. Cova and Fer help their friend Julio to finally face the great secret. Cova and Fer accompany Julio to the cemetery so that he can say goodbye to his brother Rubén.
7	7	"Secretos y mentiras (Parte 1)"	24 March 2008
Irene is determined to get close to Isaac again. Isaac notices this change in attitude in his teacher and is receptive. Both Mario, Irene's boyfriend, and Yoli, the girlfriend and Isaac realize that their partners are becoming more distant and elusive. Meanwhile, Clara catches Gorka fooling around with another girl from school. Ruth, upon finding out, out of jealousy, quarrels with her boyfriend, who ends up leaving her. Ruth, unaware of the degree of addiction she has towards Gorka, will do whatever it takes to get him back. Olimpia's marital situation worsens when Felix discovers that his wife is pregnant. She does not know if the child she is expecting is from her husband or from Roque. Adolfo, Félix's friend and supporter, begins to suspect that Olimpia and her son are up to something. For his part, Cabano is still interested in Paula and does everything possible to make the girl notice him and leave Jan. After days of absence, he returns to school to announce that his parents have already bought him a ticket to China. They force him to leave. The boys, mobilized by Cova and Paula, will mount an unexpected protest that will bring problems to the school. And serious consequences to Cabano. Fer's parents, worried about how strange and elusive they see their son, decide to foster family dialogue. Fer finds himself with the possibility of confessing to them that he is gay, but he neither dares nor believes that they can be counted on, but with the support of Julio and Cova he will. Fer feels that Julio and Cova are putting him aside.
8	8	"Secretos y mentiras (Parte 2)"	31 March 2008
Irene discovers the reason why Isaac has not shown up for their appointment. She finally realizes that she is in love with the boy and then does everything possible to get him back. But Isaac is not going to make it easy for him now, since he does not want to live their relationship in secret. Blanca has to deal with her new feelings for Mario when she learns that Jonathan is returning to Spain. Meanwhile, he discovers that Irene was responsible for the chaining in Jan's store, to prevent Cabano from being mistreated by his parents. Blanca then decides to summon the boy's parents. Gorka crashes Cabano's car. And he is very angry because Gorka does not give importance to what he has done, he decides to open his eyes by taking revenge on him. Clara sees how Ruth returns to Gorka and how he begins to spend most of his time at her house. When she discovers a video of Ruth humiliating herself for Gorka, Clara gives her an ultimatum. Fer begins to doubt Julio's heterosexuality due to a small incident. And he begins to think that maybe he can have a chance with him. Julio confesses to Fer that he is in love with Cova. At the end Julio and Cova kiss at a pool party at Julio's house.

=== Season 2 (2008) ===
No. overall	No. in season	Title	Original release date
9	1	"Las mejores intenciones"	8 September 2008
Yoli tells the principal and the head of studies that Isaac and Irene kissed. Instead of denying it, Irene admits for the first time that it is true and that much more happened between her and her student. At that moment they call her on the phone to tell her that Ruth is in a coma, due to an overdose. Paula is one of those who insults Gorka the most because of what she has done to Ruth. Gorka, fed up with so much harassment, decides to use the photo in which Paula and Cabano are in the pool and sends it to Jan. He gets terribly angry with Paula and breaks up with her. Hours pass and Gorka feels more and more guilty about what happened to his girl. Roque, fed up with Olimpia avoiding her, confronts her and declares his love for her. But Olimpia thinks he only does it because now he knows that she is expecting a child. Miguel, a new teacher, wants to give a theater workshop among the students, all the teachers doubt that anyone will sign up for that workshop. He bets that at the end of the week all the students will be in that workshop. Julio wants Cova as a girlfriend, but Cova can't decide to have a traditional relationship with Julio.
10	2	"El corazón tiene razones que la razón desconoce"	15 September 2008
Irene and Isaac finally live their relationship without ties. While Isaac openly enjoys it, Irene, now unemployed, sinks into boredom, despair of unemployment and doubt that she has made the right decision. Blanca threatens Miguel with reporting to the school administration if the theater teacher does not change his relaxation methods that are so inappropriate for underage students. Yoli is still affected by Isaac's betrayal. But, far from sinking, she decides to move on from her ex-boyfriend, and from any commitment, going back to being the sexually hyperactive girl she always was. Paula, who suspects that it was Yoli who left Isaac because of her new outrageous, critical attitude and moves away from her friend. Félix, overwhelmed by having to see his ex and the man who has taken it off every day and by not being able to control his students, begins to suffer from the so-called "Burned Teacher Syndrome". In a fit of anger, provoked by Ruth's impertinent attitude, Félix slaps Ruth in the middle of class, which Clara sees. Fer finds a surprise in his folder: a letter from Hugo, his chat partner, in which he meets him at school, Fer attends the date to find out who his mysterious friend is. And Roque will be quite a surprise when he discovers who has come to replace Irene as a philosophy teacher. The past knocks on your door.
11	3	"Una cuestión de equilibrio"	22 September 2008
Irene gets a new job at a pet store, while trying to save her relationship with Isaac, which is deteriorating by the minute. The fact that your former students ask for your help will make you rethink your decision never to teach again. Leo has not gotten off to a good start in school. His teaching methods collide with the students, who fed up decide to spoil his classes so that Irene can return. This situation, together with the constant fight with Olimpia to capture Roque's attention, will reveal her true personality, that of a manipulative woman unable to stop at anything to get what she wants. Isaac begins to worry when he sees Irene more and more distant, and will try by all means to fix the situation. But it won't be easy, especially when, thanks to Miguel's intervention, Isaac has to do a theater exercise with Yoli that will have unexpected consequences for both of them. Fer will discover thanks to Oliver that Hugo really existed, but after the humiliation suffered at the hands of Gorka he will not want to try to meet him. Cova and Julio, for their part, continue to deal with his virginity. Ruth begins to miss Gorka and decides to try to be his friend, but he will not make it easy for her, Cabano, seeing how Gorka treats Ruth badly, he will take her side, which will make them bond more.
12	4	"Yo soy yo... y mi circunstancia"	29 September 2008
Roque is faced with a serious problem. After Leo's departure from school, he discovers that his ex-wife also wants to leave the country, and take her daughter Alba with her. Roque tries to convince her not to do it but Leo does not give up, which leads Roque to make a decision that could have very serious repercussions. Meanwhile, Blanca resents Miguel because he treats her as if she were a child. Irene, lying, makes Miguel believe that Blanca is not the dead fly she seems at all. And Miguel is intrigued. Until he discovers that Blanca is playing with him. Miguel decides that now it is his turn to laugh and the game reaches a point where it can turn into something more dangerous. Irene, covered by Isaac, returns to school to teach, but that return is not going to be easy, Isaac tries to get back to Yoli but she doesn't give him any ease. While Ruth and Cabano get along better and better, at the same time Ruth is distancing herself from Gorka and she begins to lie to him so that she can be alone with Cabano, Ruth has another open battle, she has not forgiven that Félix slapped her and now she faces Olimpia herself. In addition, she has obtained a regulation from the school and discovers that Olimpia does not respect the rules when taking the exams. A war between some teachers and students with the regulations as an excuse breaks out and Adolfo does not know how to stop it. Julio and Cova make a plan to meet Hugo. Also, Jan accidentally reveals that Julio is a virgin, Julio gets upset with Fer because he thinks he has told everyone about it but it was Cova, Julio and Cova have a strong argument where he tells Cova that he is in love with her, but that every time they try to have sex he feels that he is betraying his brother, since he feels that he is stealing something of his.
13	5	"De la amistad"	6 October 2008
The change in attitude towards Félix's life makes Clara start to confuse her feelings towards him. Olimpia will witness this approach, while suffering the coldness of her relationship with Roque and the most uncomfortable symptoms of her pregnancy. Fer takes the first steps in her relationship with Hugo, the boy she met through the chat. The new experience will take you away from your friends little by little. Yoli's brother Berto gets out of jail, Yoli will fight to reinsert him due to the mistrust of her friends and teachers, who still remember the problem that the girl got into because of Berto when he was still in prison. After the cancellation of his father's bank accounts, Cabano cannot pay the Zurbarán monthly payment, he will need to pass all the subjects to continue in school, on the other hand, his temptation for Ruth grows by the day, and he fears that he will betray his best friend Gorka.
14	6	"Verdades aplazados"	13 October 2008
Paula falls asleep in Jan's arms and spends the night away from home. This causes the anger of her parents and they also find out that the girl has a boyfriend. Paula does not tell them that he is Chinese and Jan thinks that she is ashamed of him and that his parents are racists. Paula will try to prove to him that it is not true, but he is wrong. Irene thinks that if Miguel does not like it, it is because perhaps the theater teacher is homosexual and that is how he tells Blanca. The literature teacher never ceases to be surprised by the enormous ego of her colleague and friend. Olimpia confronts Clara about a matter of changing class schedules since Clara has given her more teaching hours and she does not agree. In development, Olimpia will try to get the mutual's doctor to sign off for her. Faced with the doctor's refusal, and a new confrontation with Clara, Olimpia decided to present herself as Zurbarán's director. Isaac wants Miguel to confess in front of the entire staff room why he has photos of boys with threatening phrases. Miguel refuses to give in to blackmail, but faced with Isaac's direct accusation, the professor is forced to do so. Julio and Cova try to have their first time, but because of the viagra Julio takes, they end up arguing and Julio decides to separate from Cova, but she doesn't agree with him, finally Julio and Cova reconcile and decide to move forward with their relationship and solve their problems together, Julio and Cova skip class and go to a park where they have sex together for the first time, Julio tells Cova that he doesn't have a condom but she doesn't care.
15	7	"El pasado siempre llama dos veces"	20 October 2008
Isaac continues to believe that Miguel did not tell the whole truth about the accident, and decides to continue investigating. His new discoveries will force Miguel to confront his painful past and confess a surprising secret. Félix, confused by his regained friendship with Olimpia, begins to believe that he still has a chance to save his marriage. Roque will suffer this approach without resigning herself to losing an Olimpia increasingly excited about the idea of being a mother. Gorka is still determined to find out who Ruth is with, and asks Cabano for help, who for fear of losing his best friend will not dare to confess that he is the other. Ruth is growing sick of the situation. Blanca, after going to bed with Miguel, realizes that she wants something more but that he is not there for work. He decides to forget about what happened, and not tell Irene anything, who, tired of Miguel going beyond her, will change his strategy. Olimpia makes official her intention to present herself as head of the school. But first he will have to get the call for elections, and for this he must win the support of the APA, students and the faculty. Adolfo and Clara, confident, will not give him any option. Julio and Cova are concerned that they had their first time without a condom.
16	8	"Elecciones"	27 October 2008
The confrontation between de Olimpia and Clara will finally be decided in the elections that take place. During the course of which Clara is worried about Adolfo who has disappeared and shows no signs of life, Blanca decides to tell Miguel how she feels about him, however, things will not turn out as expected. Julio and Cova are still worried that they had their first without a condom and Cova has not had her period yet but she lies to Julio telling him that she is menstruating and that they are not going to enlarge the list of teenage parents, Cova takes a pregnancy test and discovers that she is pregnant and hides it from Julio, Cova tells Fer and Julio finds out because he accidentally overhears the conversation, after class they go to a hospital so that Cova can have some blood tests done for them to be sure that the pregnancy test result is true. Meanwhile, Yoli behaves strangely after what happened with Oliver and after Isaac finds out, he asks Irene for help.
17	9	"Adictos"	3 November 2008
Cova and Julio are not going through their best moment in their relationship and he believes that it is best if they leave him, although Cova prefers to talk things out. Gorka takes refuge in drugs after seeing that she has lost her friends, and Irene opens a new world for Clara on the internet, where they will discover something about one of her students. And Blanca tries by all means not to approach Miguel so as not to break the pact with Irene and it would bring bad consequences.
18	10	"Mentiras tan frías"	10 November 2008
Jan's wedding with her cousin Xiaomei is approaching and Paula takes it worse and worse, until she gets into a fight inside the school with Xiaomei. Paula gives Jan an ultimatum: either her or the wedding. Jan makes a decision that will mean a total change in their lives. The love triangle continues: Miguel is involved with Blanca and Irene behind their backs until they find out. Without telling him anything, they decide to have it the best. Thus a covert battle begins. Irene shows a certain arrogance to Blanca, as if taking for granted that she will win. And that leads Blanca to play dirty to stay with the teacher. And foul play will have consequences. Ruth knows that Clara saw her boyfriend undress on the internet. But she doesn't say anything to anyone and hopes that at least Cabano will be able to open up to her. But Cabano won't. Clara, meanwhile, looks for a job for Cabano so that he can leave the world of porn pages. But in Ruth's eyes, that favor makes her believe that there is something between Clara and Cabano. Clara will discover that seeing Cabano just once get naked on the internet can be very expensive for her. The rumor is spreading that Julio cheated on Cova. He will try to stop him but the news reaches Gorka, who, hurt by a mockery from Julio, blackmails him. Julio ends up not accepting the blackmail and Gorka tells Cova that she is a cuckold. Will it be the end of this couple? Olimpia is having a lot of problems in her new school leadership. And to complicate everything further, the doctor recommends you rest because your blood pressure is very high and that can be fatal for your pregnancy. But she will hide it from Roque and will continue working.
19	11	"Cuestión de confianza"	17 November 2008
Cabano is sure that Ruth, despite being with him, is still in love with Gorka. And he is not the only one who thinks so, Fer believes it too, and his kindness will lead him to help a desperate Gorka to try to get his girl back. Of course, Fer will not make it easy for Gorka. Blanca finds Miguel and Irene naked in the bathtub and, hurt by her friend's betrayal, decides to leave home. Roque will be forced to take her in, which will cause tensions in his coexistence with Olimpia. Regretful, Irene will do everything possible to make her friend forgive her and return home. Cova and Paula find out that Oliver abused Yoli and try to help their friend overcome it. However, Yoli will realize that the only one who can help her is Isaac. In turn, Irene, scared because Miguel begins to feel something more for her, will get closer to Isaac, who will feel enormous nostalgia for the past.For his part, Adolfo has decided to face his illness by living life with intensity, as if every day was the last, a decision that neither his wife nor his son Roque will understand. But that will not stop Adolfo, who will feel more alive than ever. Although it was Julio who was unfaithful to Cova, it is he who is convinced that she is not really in love, and that she begins to suffer from jealousy. Distrust will make Julio lose his head and not only that. The success that Xaomei has among the boys, Jan's future wife of convenience, will cause Paula to distrust the fidelity of her boyfriend again.
20	12	"Te quiero y es mi culpa"	24 November 2008
When Paula discovers some pictures of Xiaomei on Jan's pad, Jan will blame it on her. Angry and drunk, Paula will make a mistake that will jeopardize the wedding ... so she will be forced to do what she least wants to do: help Jan and Xiaomei to keep the wedding going. With Blanca's return home it seems that everything is back to normal. But things will get complicated again when Miguel confesses that he is in love with Irene and asks for her help to win her over. Forced to help him, she decides to put an end to so many lies and finally tell Miguel that she is the one who is in love with him. After sleeping together, Loli decides that they cannot continue their relationship and leaves Adolfo. The discovery by Isaac and Roque of what has happened between him and Loli, will only be the beginning of a series of situations that will end up uncovering the truth about Adolfo's illness. Isaac, after discovering that his mother is sleeping with Adolfo and being rejected by Irene, will feel lonely and cheated, which will lead him to make a decision that may take him away from school forever. Olimpia, pressured by the parents' association so that the play is not performed, will launch a plan to boycott it, a plan that will eventually turn against her. Gorka and Ruth are back together, but Cabano's ghost hovers over the relationship and Cabano is unable to relax. When Gorka has an erotic dream about the wrong person, she will begin to doubt his sexuality.
21	13	"El eterno retorno (Parte 1)"	1 December 2008
Ruth threatens Gorka with leaving him permanently if he doesn't fix things with Cabano. Gorka, by not losing his girlfriend, makes his former best friend believe that everything is the same as before.After the premiere of Miguel's controversial play, the Zurbarán school wakes up with graffiti on its walls: they are direct threats to those responsible for the work. To the horror of Olimpia and Roque, Leo, the ex-wife of the art teacher, returns. And this time it comes with terrible news. Blanca, dead of shame for having openly declared her love for Miguel, prefers to flee from him and avoid looking at his face. But Miguel is not willing to lose her. The girls in 1º B publish a list of the most massive of the class, in which Jan comes out quite badly. After the humiliation, Jan finds out that his girl, Paula, has voted for Cabano. Jan, with wounded pride, takes refuge in the arms of his cousin Xiaomei. Irene feels that her feelings for Isaac are reawakening. Which Yoli, on the other hand, seems determined to do as well. Fer is reunited with Carlos, the boy who gave her her first kiss. This time Fer wants to try something with the boy, even if he has to put Julio aside. Julio, fought with the world, returns to shutting himself up in sports as an escape route. In his new gym he meets Rodri, a monitor from the center with whom he will connect from the beginning.
22	14	"El eterno retorno (Parte 2)"	8 December 2008
Isaac suffered a severe blow to the head when he fell off the quad on which he was riding with Cabano. Isaac regains consciousness in the hospital, but will stay for a day under observation to check that he has no sequels left from the accident. His sister Paula, Irene and all the friends breathe a sigh of relief to discover that he will make a full recovery. Although the only ones who do not seem so happy are Gorka and Cabano because they fear that Isaac will now go off the hook and tell exactly what happened on the excursion and that they had a lot to do with that accident. Meanwhile, Adolfo is admitted to the same hospital for his neurosurgery operation. There he receives bad news. The surgeon tells him, his wife and his son that the tumor has invaded a very delicate area and that there is a good chance that it will not leave the operating room. Of course, Adolfo and family receive the information like a blow. Roque, who can no longer bear any more stress, collapses. For his part, Jan tries to get Paula back, but she is not willing to forgive him for his infidelity with Xiaomei, no matter how much the boy crawls humiliated. Paula just wants to thank Cabano for getting her brother out from under the quad. She is unaware that if her brother is injured, it is partly Cabano's fault. And this, seeing Paula so grateful, does not dare to tell her the truth either.

=== Season 3 (2009) ===
No. overall	No. in season	Title	Original release date
23	1	"Empezar de nuevo"	13 April 2009
A month has passed since Isaac's death and Paula tries to recover from the terrible loss. She keeps a diary where she writes down the many news that have happened in this time: Jan has disappeared from her life, new students have come to class, Cabano is very affectionate with her. In reality, Cabano feels guilty for not telling Paula what really happened on the day of her brother's death. He has regrets, thinks about confessing everything, but Gorka is there to cover his mouth. Cabano continues, despite everything, with doubts, will he end up telling everything? Julio, meanwhile, feels more and more integrated with his dangerous and aggressive new group of friends. Lucía, his new girlfriend and sister of the group leader, will force him to choose between her and his lifelong friends. Olimpia's pregnancy reaches its last phase, and she still does not want to know anything about Roque, who at the same time tries to get his job back at Zurbarán. Yoli becomes infatuated with Quino, one of the new students. An attractive boy, Latin and with the appearance of a rocker. However, a big surprise awaits Yoli on their first date.
24	2	"El adiós"	20 April 2009
Yoli and Quino keep trying to carry on their relationship, despite their huge differences. Homosexuality and their relationship with Fer will be a new obstacle in their love story. Also, Ruth can't stand Alma, one of the new students, fooling around with Gorka. He is going to try by all means to put the newcomer in a bad way, and a surprising discovery will make things easier for him. On the other hand, Violeta, Irene's niece, intends to stay and live with her aunt, which is not very funny to her. Violeta is going to have an exceptional ally, Blanca. The teacher redoubles her efforts as a charitable soul and lends a hand to Yoli's brother, Berto, to get him to graduate from school. Cova announces, to everyone's surprise, that she is leaving the city because her father has been given a job in Alicante and they have to move, nobody can believe it, an afternoon as pleasant as it is unexpected shared with Julio is going to complicate her decision whether or not to go with her parents to Alicante, but she is determined to leave, Cova waits for Julio to show up at the bus station to stop her from leaving and ask her to stay with him, but he never came. Olimpia is still in the hospital where she just gave birth. The news that reaches her is disturbing: Martín, the new teacher, has temporarily taken up her post as director.
25	3	"Crimen y castigo"	27 April 2009
Martín gathers the teachers together and announces the change in the direction: Olimpia leaves and he, momentarily, takes the position, while he takes the opportunity to introduce Thomas, a backup English teacher, to the faculty. Clara and Olimpia blame Adolfo for not having defended them and that, as head of studies, he appears as a wimp in front of Martín and his policy change in the center. Adolfo, touched, thinks about resigning. For his part, Roque buys baby clothes for Olimpia's baby, tries a rapprochement, but she rejects the gift. Blanca makes friends with the new teacher, deep down she feels sorry that he is so alone. Organize an outing and bundle Irene to let the three of you go. But Blanca, who has decided to help Berto with the graduate, in a task that not even she masters, ends up entertaining herself and leaves Irene hanging with Thomas, the new teacher. As for the Zurbarán students, Rodrigo prepares a party at the disco where he is in charge of security. He puts pressure on Julio so that, despite his restraining order, he distributes flyers at the institute. All the boys from the institute agree to stop by the party that Julio announced. Rodrigo discovers Fer with another boy in the disco's bathrooms and prepares to kick him out, with a beating in between. Julio defends his friend, confronts Rodrigo and another goalkeeper, and ends up receiving a beating to death. Quino is still burdened by Yoli's boyfriends in the past, and she maintains the lie that there were only three of them. Quino discovers the truth about Yoli's sentimental past and, making an excuse, leaves.
26	4	"¿Y tú qué te apuestas?"	4 May 2009
Julio recovers in hospital from the beating that Rodrigo, the violent boss of his old group of friends, gave him. Violeta, who seems to have feelings for him, visits him with the excuse of taking notes. Fer does not know that Julio is afraid to report the aggression, when he finds out he will try to convince him that he is morally obliged to do so, but Julio resists. The unlikely relationship between Irene and Thomas, the new English teacher, is going to have to deal with language problems. The institute is more upset than ever: Martín wants to evaluate the teachers and as if this were not enough, Félix reappears when he learns that Olimpia has had a child. Two fronts open to Blanca in the sentimental field, two very different possibilities, Berto and Martín. Quino's chastity is going to be severely tested by Cabano, Alma and Gorka, who are willing to do anything as long as the new student sleeps with Yoli while Ruth's self-esteem problems begin to be worrisome.
27	5	"La prueba"	11 May 2009
Cabano asks Alma for help to get Paula back. The newcomer to Zurbarán, very much in her style, will be able to take advantage of this request to end up twisting things for her own benefit. Blanca is given a gift without a specific sender. She interprets that the person responsible is Martín, although he may not be right. Fer is going to meet David, a friend of Julio's, who is very fond of video games. Fer is immediately attracted to him, but the signals that come back to him are very disconcerting. Meanwhile, Olimpia continues to show rejection towards her baby. At that moment, news reaches her from the hospital: the newborn is seriously ill. Roque receives a somewhat difficult task, to set up an activity in which he involves the students to demonstrate that video games can be educational and instructive. The teacher doesn't even know where to start. Violeta's expertise in video games will bring her closer to Julio, who is impressed by the knowledge of his new partner in this field. Meanwhile Fer will get a big surprise from David.
28	6	"Yo te atraigo, tu me atraes..."	18 May 2009
In addition to setting up the "Ciberzurbarán", Cabano and Gorka, using Cabano's mobile, secretly record Clara while she tries to park. The teacher, who continues to self-medicate, hits a motorcycle and runs away, overwhelmed. This simple hooliganism, after Alma's intervention, is going to become a serious problem that is going to involve Zurbarán teachers and students. Fer and Yoli want to find out two things: Fer wants to know if David, Julio's friend who kissed him the other night, is gay or not; and Yoli wants to know whether or not Quino's chastity is a ploy to avoid sex because, deep down, he is equally homosexual. Meanwhile, Adolfo begins the divorce proceedings for Marisa, his wife. Blanca decides to go all out with Martín, however her conquest plans are going to have a very different result than expected. Irene, with her boyfriend on a trip, decides to have fun with an old girlfriend. Julio sends Violeta some compromising photos of him by mistake.
29	7	"Lo que no me atrevo a decirte"	25 May 2009
Paula confesses to Alma that her relationship with Cabano has ended forever. However, Alma is unwilling to let the story between the two end so quickly and Ruth unknowingly gets caught up in her plans. Yoli finds a bawdy song that Quino has composed. A question suddenly arises: is she the protagonist of those risque verses? The video of the game in which Irene and Julio virtually get involved begins to run through the institute. The consequences for Violeta are going to be unexpected. Olympia doesn't know what to do with her baby. The solution may come from the hand of the person who least expects, Gorka. Blanca decides to hide from Martín that she slept with Berto. Neither of her two suitors seems willing to make the choice easy for her. Clara and her problem with the pills gets complicated and begins to affect her profession. David keeps giving the wrong signals to Fer, who is losing his mind. Tired, he decides to put the cards on the table at once.
30	8	"Yo nunca he..."	1 June 2009
Paula suspects that there is some dark personal interest behind Alma's intention that her relationship with Cabano not end. Julio and Violeta meet to play a console game at her house. Irene knows that Julio is ashamed to meet his niece and is afraid that he will end up hurting her. Martín tries to fix things with Blanca, but Berto is going to get in his way again. Fer still doesn't understand anything: David, who seemed to be interested in him, has hooked up with Ruth and Gorka is going to witness a scene that will change the fate of this complicated relationship. Clara, for her part, refuses to take the leave and Martín warns her that he will be watching her. The first failure can cost you dearly. Yoli, in her struggle to maintain her relationship with Quino above all else, makes a promise: no sin for a week. A surprise party at Violeta's house is going to be a very tough test for her. Meanwhile Erica, a friend from Alma's past appears assuring that she has a terrible secret to tell.
31	9	"Superación"	8 June 2009
Erica, Alma's childhood friend, has dropped a bomb: Alma killed someone years ago. Cabano and Paula begin to investigate the past of their new partner. Blanca accepts an invitation from Berto to go to the theater, but this time it will be Martín who, without knowing anything, disrupts his plans and forces him to decide between them. Violeta, hiding in the bathroom, hears some hurtful words from Julio towards her. Dolida is going to publish the video where Yoli and Julio kiss in the bathroom. Those images are going to bring everyone involved in this story upside down. Olimpia confronts Clara: how could she not tell her that her son fell to the ground when she was taking care of him? Gorka, who has secretly discovered the relationship between David and Fer, blackmails the former into being fatal to Ruth. Rodrigo, the violent leader of Julio's old group of friends, reappears and seeks to exact his revenge once and for all.
32	10	"Salto al vacío (Parte 1)"	15 June 2009
Blanca is increasingly confused: it cannot be said between Martín or Berto. Thus, encouraged by Irene, she decides to make a list of the pros and cons of both suitors. Quino is on the brink of his strength. Every day it becomes more difficult for him to endure without pouncing on Yoli. Lately, he's even had racy hallucinations that make things worse. The time has come to do something. Cabano asks teachers for understanding when grading their exams. It has been a very hard year for him and, if he does not pass the subjects, he may lose the scholarship. This petition will end up facing Irene and Olimpia. Clara is temporarily removed from the institute by Martín. Julio and Violeta try to pressure the principal to reinstate the teacher, an initiative that will bring them many problems in full final exams. Gorka tries to keep a close eye on Ruth. His problems with food are becoming more apparent. Things get complicated when Clara discovers that Ruth suffers from bulimia. Paula is very concerned about the images in which the institute appears on fire in the Zurbarán cyber game. He begins to suspect that, perhaps, Alma is thinking of doing the same in real life.
33	11	"Salto al vacío (Parte 2)"	22 June 2009
Ruth is reluctant to enter a clinic to treat her eating disorders. She asks Gorka for help, but the latter, warned by Clara to stay away, cannot do anything for her. Thomas reappears in the center. He admits that he has made a mistake leaving Irene, but this, hurt, does not seem willing to forgive him. While the confrontation between Irene and Olimpia for the approval of Cabano increases in intensity. David tries to fix things with Fer. An extreme situation will resolve things between the two of you. Quino and Yoli decide to jump into having sex at last. The first attempt, however, is somewhat disastrous. Violeta, delighted after the kiss that Julio gave her, suggests that they take an Inter Rail trip together that summer. Julio is overwhelmed, he has doubts. Paula tries to convince the teachers that Alma is trying to set fire to the institute. Nobody believes him. Shortly after, the doors of the center appear barred and thick smoke peeks out of one of the rooms ... fire! Berto and Martín meet at Blanca's house and discover the two-way game that the teacher has played. The time has come for her to make a decision and she does ... who will be chosen?

=== Season 4 (2009) ===
No. overall	No. in season	Title	Original release date
34	1	"El final del verano"	22 September 2009
During the summer more things have happened. The relationship between Roque and Alma has become closer, to the point that now that the course begins, the new situation makes the teacher uncomfortable. Clara, during this time and influenced by the example of Olimpia, rethinks the issue of motherhood. Blanca tries on her wedding dress. The preparations for her wedding have already begun, who will finally be chosen to accompany her on the altar? Meanwhile, Thomas and Irene arrive from their vacations in the United States and bring news that Blanca is not going to be amused. A trip to the swamp during the summer will have many consequences for the fate of the group of students. Couples that break up, new stories that are formed. Things at the Zurbarán have changed a lot after that excursion and that not everyone knows everything that happened there. Paula gets a totally unexpected surprise as a result of that summer camping trip.
35	2	"Maternidad"	23 September 2009
Gorka and Fer, determined to get some extra money, go to a fertility center to donate their semen. Paula, meanwhile, tries to let only Yoli know that she is pregnant, and in no case does she intend to say who the father is. Which is not going to be easy for you. Violeta has met a friend in the chat. The problem is that she has sold herself as an expert in the sexual field, which could not be further from the truth. David has decided that he wants to tell his parents that he is gay. For this difficult moment, ask Fer for help. Berto, ready to get Blanca back at all costs, fools around with a student to make the teacher jealous. This tactic works more than she would like to admit. Clara is willing to move on with the issue of her motherhood. You will receive a visit from a social worker to determine if you are suitable to adopt or not. Ruth is going to help her a lot in this difficult situation. Martín decides to take a surprise drug test at high school. The highly controversial measure is going to pose serious problems for several students and the occasional teacher.
36	3	"Cuestión de posibilidades"	30 September 2009
Paula has an appointment for her first ultrasound. The entire institute, teachers included, becomes abuzz with rumors and Martín decides to have a chat with her to make her consider all the options. Gorka, meanwhile, very overwhelmed, considers leaving school and even the city. Cabano's medical test results are yet to come, he fears the worst and Ruth tries to encourage him. Yoli, for her part, tries to reconcile with Quino after her romantic breakup. Thus, he discovers an Internet contest where people can submit their music videos and without asking Quino's permission, Yoli decides to target him without thinking much about the consequences. Meanwhile, Blanca dreams of a trip to New York for the honeymoon, however, Martín has very different ideas regarding the travel destination after the wedding. Violeta keeps in touch with her flirt on the Internet. This one urges him to see each other to finally make out. Violeta, who has lied about her love skills, is desperate. Julio will come to their aid and that will unite them more than ever. However, an unexpected last minute hurdle is going to appear when the two closest guys sit down.
37	4	"Lo hago por tu bien"	7 October 2009
Cabano tells Ruth of his illness and becomes more distant from her. Gorka, for his part, insists Paula: he wants to be a father to the baby she is expecting, and have responsibilities in her care. Paula is not sure what to do. Vaquero, the new Physical Education teacher, arrives at the institute. His entry will provoke many reactions: he is flirtatious, attractive, quite carefree and also, a plugged one. All this is going to bring him not a few problems in his first days at Zurbarán. Javier, David's father, apologizes to Olimpia for having cheated on her and not having told him that he is married. He is sorry and wants a second chance. Olympia hesitates. Yoli's ploy to enter Quino in a music video contest pays off: Quino receives a call to audition to be the lead singer in a major musical.
38	5	"No se lo cuentes a nadie"	14 October 2009
David and Fer hook up at David's house. At the most inopportune moment, David's parents appear. The two boys have to hide and get out of the way. However, David's mother discovers a photograph in which her son and Fer appear in a more than suspicious attitude. The family mess is served. Vicente, the main shareholder of Zurbarán and father of Vaquero, the new Physical Education teacher, asks Martín for an explanation for the article that Adolfo has written. Martín promises to take action and asks Adolfo for a letter of rectification. Gorka, concerned about his future paternity, wants to know if there is a history of hereditary diseases in his family. To do this, he has to talk to his mother without her knowing that he is going to be a father. Paula has made him promise to keep the secret. Blanca considers that Martín spends every day more of the wedding preparations and, by extension, of her. Encouraged by Irene, she decides to make him jealous with Berto. Vaquero, meanwhile, sees Ruth devastated by the issue of Cabano's illness. He tries to cheer her up, but Cabano is going to witness some intimate scenes between the teacher and his girlfriend that he is going to interpret as what he is not.
39	6	"Sinceramente..."	21 October 2009
Roque opens his exhibition of paintings and, to his surprise, discovers Alma among the attendees. As if that were not enough, his father also appears there, and suspects that Alma may have posed scantily clad for his son. Adolfo, for his part, is going to find himself in trouble: the article he wrote criticizing Zurbarán's educational methods is going to have serious consequences for him. Yoli feels more and more sentimentally inclined towards Julio. She wants to hook up with him, but Quino gets in the way. Paula looks at Gorka with better eyes every day. That benevolent look is gradually transforming into something else. Irene goes ahead with her plan to go to places to exchange couples, and drags Thomas into this initiative, who does not see it at all clear. Cabano still has problems accepting his sick situation. Ruth tries to cheer him up as much as she can, even though he doesn't make it easy for her. Fer knows that David's father is seeing Olimpia. As David is very pressured by his family due to his sexual condition, Fer does not know whether to use this information to help her boy or not. Martín's severe attitude at work raises doubts in Blanca: does she really want to marry such an upright and serious man?
40	7	"Confía en mí"	28 October 2009
Paula is going to suffer some punctures in the stomach. She thinks it's nothing serious, but Gorka is going to be obsessed with seeing a good doctor as soon as possible. Alma promises Roque that if he hands over the sketch of the portrait he made of her, she will leave him alone. However, the student has no intention that things with Roque end there and is going to use the paint to set him up. Yoli tries by all means to prevent Quino from seeing her with Julio, but she will fail in her goal. Quino's reaction will alarm Yoli. Irene thinks Thomas has hooked up with the exchange partner; Although Blanca does not want to do the same, she has the need to make the English teacher believe that she has also had sex with another. Cabano begins chemotherapy sessions. He is more sensitive and elusive than ever, rejecting all the help offered by Ruth, Clara or his mother. Martín and Blanca continue with the wedding preparations. Things are going to get complicated when Martín discovers an affectionate message from Berto on Blanca's cell phone. Finally, David has left home due to the harassment of his parents. Fer proposes that she move in with him until things are sorted out, something that will not be so easy.
41	8	"Tú primero"	4 November 2009
Olimpia catches Gorka buying marijuana. Martín's new rules force the expulsion of any student who gets into drugs within the institute. However, when it is known that the Maria is to help Cabano with his illness, the debate will break out in the center. Ruth and Paula are friends again. Ruth then discovers that Paula is beginning to have feelings for Gorka. Determined that her friend does not suffer the same as she does, she is going to insist on showing that Gorka is still a bad person. Thomas and Irene have reconciled but the ghost of the open relationship and their dalliances with other couples will make it difficult for the couple to stay together. Blanca continues to be concerned about the reflection period that Martín is taking after discovering that she and Berto kissed. Things, however, are going to get even worse between them. Yoli and Julio feel terrible about the bad moment that Quino is going through and they decide to set up a big bottle for him near his house for his birthday. David learns from Fer that his father has cheated on his mother with Olimpia.
42	9	"Aceptar responsabilidades"	11 November 2009
Blanca's parents appear at the worst moment: she and Martín have just broken up and their parents still don't know anything. Blanca begs Martín to pretend that they are both going ahead with the wedding. Cabano receives terrible medical news. Ruth fears that the disease will finally separate Cabano from her. Vaquero's father throws him out of the house. He is tired of his little responsibility and wants him to mature. The gym teacher tries to find accommodation in the house of a Zurbarán classmate. Julio and Yoli try to ingratiate themselves with Quino and throw him a party at Julio's house in which all attendees must come in their underwear. Paula tries to regain her self-esteem after the rejection she suffered from Gorka and looks for a temporary flirt that will give her a little joy. After their sexual encounter, the reunion in the classrooms between Roque and Alma is very uncomfortable. In fact, Roque believes that it is best to get away from her. Alma, on the other hand, is not willing to let things between them end easily. David's father threatens to leave town and take his son with him, Fer tries to stop this from happening.
43	10	"Otra oportunidad"	18 November 2009
Cabano will finally undergo surgery to try to remove his cancer. Ruth throws a surprise party for him at the institute to try to cheer him up. Cabano's reaction is not going to be what his girlfriend expected. Irene is disappointed when she discovers that Thomas is taking his new girlfriend to Blanca and Martín's wedding as a couple. Abusing his friendship with Blanca, he tries to get her to cancel the invitation to the English teacher. Blanca loses the Literature exams before she can correct them. She does not know what to do so that Martín does not discover her mistake and thinks that she is careless. So he decides to make up the notes. Julio's father, Alonso, suddenly reappears after ten years without giving any sign. Julio radically rejects him, he does not want to know anything about him. Roque still cannot find inspiration for his paintings. An acquaintance offers you drugs to help stimulate creativity. The teacher hesitates, does not know what to do. Alma witnesses how Yoli abuses a little of her friendship with Quino to ask him for all kinds of favors. So she decides to help him, teaching him to be more "bad", something more selfish and ready for others. Fer wants to set up an association to help gays and lesbians within the Zurbarán. David, to Fer's surprise, does not want to participate or help him in the initiative.
44	11	"Autocontrol"	25 November 2009
After his operation, Cabano tries to fix things with Ruth, but she is very hurt and does not give him a choice. Meanwhile, Andrea, his chemotherapy partner, tries to support him in this low moment, but she is not totally honest with him, she also feels something for Cabano. For his part, Martín has a budget accounting problem. Olimpia is happy to see how the person who has replaced him in the management of the center go through economic-financial difficulties. But the situation is going to turn 180 degrees throughout the day. Vaquero denies to Irene that their relationship goes beyond the purely physical, but in reality he is getting caught by the teacher. Alonso, Julio's father, does everything possible to be accepted by his son again and surprises him by buying him a motorcycle. Roque takes drugs to keep up with the pace of painting and teaching. Alma, who smells something, tries to take advantage of this situation. Fer pressures David to stay faithful. David, despite how much it costs him, puts all his will; however he ends up connecting to a gay chat. The short film contest runs the risk of not being held due to budgetary problems, but Vaquero, who wants to win over the students, devises a plan to obtain funds.
45	12	"El tránsito de Venus"	2 December 2009
Irene has to organize Blanca and Martín's joint bachelor party. However, he has forgotten about it. You now have very little time to make all the preparations. Paula asks Gorka to accompany her to an ultrasound but does not tell her that it is the moment when they are going to tell her the sex of the baby. Gorka is also preparing a surprise for Paula: she is going to include some photos of her childhood in the video she is making for the short film contest. Cabano and Ruth maintain their differences in the relationship. Ruth continues to believe that he does not trust her, which makes the situation worse. Gorka, who seems to have matured with his future fatherhood, speaks confidently with Ruth to convince her that Cabano's intentions are good and tells her that she should continue to love him and that they should stay together. Yoli decides to tell Julio that she feels uncomfortable in the presence of his father. He has the feeling that she is looking at him with morbid eyes and that the displays of affection that she dedicates to him are not entirely innocent. Marcos, David's chat partner, harasses Fer's partner and wants to continue his sexual adventure. David refuses, for nothing in the world does he want Fer to know that he has cheated on him. However, Marcos is unwilling to retreat and leave his target so easily. Quino seems to make progress with the girls thanks to Alma's teachings. However, she sees her pupil's sudden success somewhat uncomfortable.
46	13	"Renuncias (Parte 1)"	9 December 2009
Alma continues to indoctrinate Quino to be more "bad", more savvy. However, when he tells her that he is going to a party with another girl, the young woman is jealous. In addition, the wedding of Martín and Blanca is imminent. The dates are approaching and the doubts of the step they are going to take grow with the same speed. When reviewing the video of their bachelor party, the images make it clear that there are still third parties that come between them. Paula, meanwhile, is still angry with Gorka and Ruth, but she tries to make him see that the Zurbarán thug has changed, and that he will regret it if he does not give him a chance. In addition, David tries not to let Fer discover the photos of him naked with another boy that he has posted on the Internet. Finally, Yoli has the feeling that Julio's father continues to harass her. Sensation that is going to increase when she discovers that some intimate photos of her that she sent to her boyfriend have been mysteriously lost.
47	14	"Renuncias (Parte 2)"	16 December 2009
In the church, the ceremony is underway. Blanca, along with Martín and the priest at the altar, is ready to say "yes, I want to." At that moment, out of breath, Berto appears at the door of the temple. Blanca looks at him, she doubts what to say three days before the wedding, many things have happened that have affected everyone. Paula's run-over drives Gorka out of her mind. He is furious and wants to find out at all costs who was responsible for the life of their son is now in serious danger. David, who was with Marcos in the car that hit Paula, is scared to death. If everything is discovered, not only will he have to deal with Gorka, but he will probably lose Fer forever. The alcohol that was illegally sneaked into the party has had consequences, more or less serious, for everyone: Quino dies of shame in the hospital, recovering from his first drunk, Vaquero's position at the Zurbarán is in danger and Berto, the worst offender can end up in jail. Yoli, very worried, is going to receive help from Julio's father. Help that can be very expensive. Cabano goes ahead with his plan to go on a trip to India with Ruth. However, several problems are going to complicate that romantic getaway; and Andrea, Cabano's friend with cancer, will have a lot to do with solving the problem.

=== Season 5 (2010) ===
No. overall	No. in season	Title	Original release date
48	1	"La fiesta"	11 May 2010
Some of the relationships between the boys are better than ever, like Paula and Gorka's or Fer and David's, although others don't seem to be going through their best moment, like Julio and Yoli. They all decide to join the party that Álvaro, the most popular boy in 1st B, has organized, seeking to cheer up Ruth, who misses Cabano, still in India. Alma must face the hatred of all her companions, who continue to blame her for Quino's departure. The cloister also presents some novelties, such as the arrival of a new teacher, Marina, or that Clara has decided to take a new step in her desire to be a mother, something that also affects Ruth. For his part, Martín continues to look for a replacement for Blanca, a decision that Vaquero will enter as the new majority shareholder of Zurbarán. The one who was only a Physical Education teacher before, now must face his new responsibilities and assert himself before the rest of the teachers.
49	2	"Fotos"	18 May 2010
For Teresa, the troubles related to the party have not ended, since she is going to receive something that could further endanger her situation at the Zurbarán. Fer and Yoli will find it difficult to digest having slept together after a night of drunkenness, disappointments and breakups with their respective partners, but this is also going to affect, in one way or another, David and Julio. For her part, Ruth continues to have problems living with Román, the boy Clara has taken in at home, and this uncomfortable situation between "stepbrothers" will also end up afflicting the teacher. Meanwhile, Vaquero is going to find more than one surprise with his new roommate, Verónica, and Berto will ask him for a favor that he cannot refuse regarding the football team, which is already underway. Olimpia is concerned because now everyone knows, through the anonymous blog, that she and Martín are involved, although he seems more concerned about other matters.
50	3	"Todo lo que me has ocultado"	25 May 2010
The bad vibes between Ruth and Roman continue to happen, despite the boy's heroic act. But an unexpected visit will imply new changes between them. And it is that Cabano will return from India and the situation could not be more uncomfortable. In addition, the young man comes a little different, with new ways of taking life. Olimpia does not remove from her head the image of Martín with that strange woman with whom he secretly and furtively met, so she decides to take action and find out who she is and what is the true relationship between them. For her part, Teresa is still desperate to discover the truth about what happened at Álvaro's party, and speaking with Paula and Alma about the discovery of Roman's camera, the latter comes up with an interesting idea. Fer is in for a strange surprise when David digs into his box of condoms. But this news will affect Yoli even more.
51	4	"El partido"	1 June 2010
Cabano still does not accept Roman at Ruth's house, although, after Andrea's death, he now has something more urgent and sad to think about: the funeral of his friend. To make matters worse, he is about to discover something that will only serve to worry him even more, after arguing with Ruth because his girlfriend does not accept his sudden obsession with soccer. Vaquero's discovery that Verónica is sleeping not only with him, but also with Berto, his best friend, has caused an uncomfortable situation at home, and he is quite clear about what to do about it. Paula is stressed out with all the worries she has to deal with: the baby, the classes and the investigations to find out what really happened at Álvaro's party and thus bring Gorka back.
52	5	"La sonrisa de la Gioconda"	8 June 2010
Vaquero and Berto try to digest what happened with Verónica: she assures that she loves them both equally and wants to be with both of them at the same time. For their part, Teresa, Paula and Alma seek a quick solution to prevent the threat received the day before from being carried out and that five people receive photographs of Teresa at the party. Clara, who has just discovered a dark secret about Román, must face him, a compromising situation in which she can find great support from Ruth. For Berto, Verónica's dilemma is not the only one he must face, he is also afraid that he will end up noticing how little he knows about soccer, so he asks Julio for help. Fer decides to give Yoli a very surprising gift as a thank you for their friendship, although she must also oppose Marina and her conservative ideas regarding gay marriage.
53	6	"No te vayas"	15 June 2010
Verónica will continue to find herself unable to help the young woman, just because she has to shut up the truth about her true condition, mother and daughter. Alma will once again be rejected by all her colleagues after a very important fact related to the blog has been revealed and, logically, all suspicions about the authorship of the threats against Teresa fall on her. The day of the Zurbarán Art is approaching and Fer has a great idea, an answer in a vindictive tone of certain ideas from his professor of Philosophy, Marina. But Fer will be further affected by certain behaviors of her ex, David. Martín can't think of anything other than the step that Sandra has just taken with regard to pregnancy and he continues to be surprised by the last thing he has discovered about Olimpia in relation to the streaper.
54	7	"Lo que piensan los demás"	22 June 2010
Ruth discovers the truth about Román. After this, she does not go through her best moment with her boyfriend. To top it all, Cabano notices that she is hiding something related to Roman. Julio is very confused and doesn't know what to do after what he just found out about Teresa at the party. He does not know how to act, especially seeing the great relationship that was beginning to emerge between them. Vaquero and Berto do not know how to get out of the mess of the "couple of three" who live with Verónica, especially now that she believes that things are starting to turn out well for her and wants to enjoy the sweet moment with both of them. Fer and Yoli are going to give a new twist to their relationship after what happened on Art Day, and it will not leave anyone indifferent. Martín cannot think of anything other than the step that Sandra has just taken regarding the pregnancy and he continues to be surprised by the last thing he has discovered about Olimpia, in relation to the streaper.
55	8	"Sinceridad (Parte 1)"	29 June 2010
Daniela arrives as a new student at Zurbarán, and soon she will attract attention in various aspects, especially when she discovers a foreign secret shortly after arriving at school. For her part, Alma has to make an important decision after her latest discovery regarding the photos, while Paula is increasingly desperate to discover the culprit and thus bring Gorka back. Meanwhile, Fer continues not to forget David and feels more jealous than ever after he has told her that he has rebuilt his life and is with someone else. In addition, Cabano can no longer handle Roman and his friendship with Ruth, especially after the boy's last move in a match. Olimpia is very uncomfortable with Sandra's increasing and more insistent interference in her relationship with Martín and wants to take action on it.
56	9	"Sinceridad (Parte 2)"	6 July 2010
Paula has just broken water and went into labor and everyone is mobilizing for the labor to develop normally and to find Gorka before the baby is born, although it seems that it will not be that easy. Old friends will return to the Zurbarán to be present in such a happy, although complicated, event. Cova returns from Alicante with Gorka for the birth of Isaac the son of Gorka and Paula. The arrival of Cova will bring forth feelings with Julio that already seemed forgotten. Marina is going to have to think about many things after having to reveal her great secret to everyone. And it is not a problem only for her. It seems that Vaquero, Berto and Verónica are going to find new complications in their relationship after the arrival of Daniela, the former's teenage sister, although they will not only have to worry about her. Things seem to be getting better again for Cabano and Ruth, and he comes up with a plan to further strengthen their relationship. Also, Yoli still hasn't forgotten her feelings for Fer, but he hasn't given up on David either.

=== Season 6 (2010) ===
No. overall	No. in season	Title	Original release date
57	1	"Es hora de tomar decisiones"	15 September 2010
The exams prior to Selectividad arrive at Zurbarán, revolutionizing the boys, who begin to make decisions regarding their future beyond school. Although David is more concerned with other things that already belong to the past, but that he still cannot forget and is taking some trails that his friends do not like. Especially Fer, who will try to talk to him. Ruth organizes a costume party to which she invites everyone, on the occasion of Cabano's birthday. Logically, that is something that bothers Roman Paula is going crazy with so much new responsibility, both at home and at school. Someone very special arrives at Zurbarán: Jon, an attractive young man who will immediately attract attention not only for his skills to socialize, but also for the wheelchair he needs to move around. Álvaro, whom his colleagues continue to put aside because of what happened with Teresa at that party, will try to get closer to the new one. The economic crisis will also reach the school, posing new obstacles for Martín and Vaquero when making decisions. The latter will also have to alleviate obstacles in his relationship with Berto and Verónica, when they receive an unexpected and committed visit. Meanwhile, Cova remains in Madrid helping Paula with little Isaac. Julio tells Cova that his mother wants him to go live with her in London and he doesn't know what to do, Cova tells Julio not to go to the party and to help her take care of Isaac and she helps him to make a decision, Cova and Julio while they take care of Isaac begin to talk and catch up with their lives, they end up kissing and having sex.
58	2	"Romeo y Julieta"	21 September 2010
Román's mother suddenly reappears in his life, but illusion is not exactly the word that would define the boy's feelings before such a reunion. Without wanting to, Clara will be involved in the difficult situation. The costume party that Ruth held has served to unite some boys, but also to distance others after discovering unexpected surprises, such as the one David took after meeting Borja, Fer's boyfriend. For her part, the host is now facing a tough time after the sad decision she made after the party. Paula will go to drastic measures to show everyone that she cares about her baby, although almost all her friends and teachers will worry that certain behaviors are inappropriate. The relationship between Berto, Vaquero and Verónica continues to be endangered by the presence of Luis, Teresa's father, and the one who is being harmed the most is Berto, since at certain times he feels a bit displaced. Martín comes up with a new after-school activity to help Zurbarán and his economic crisis. Julio is mulling over having to go to London with his mother, while his great relationship and friendship with Cova is taking up paths that seemed already forgotten. Cova takes Julio to the park where they had sex for the first time together and they both have an open heart conversation, after the conversation they end up kissing and having sex. David is at school looking for Cova and finds her in the library sending some emails and tells her that Julio has something to tell her and is waiting for her at Paula's house. When Cova goes to look for Julio, David realizes that Cova left her email open and discovers an email that he doesn't like and finds out by reading that email that Cova has a boyfriend in Alicante and decides to call Julio to tell him what he discovered but Julio does not answer the phone and later finds him at school and tells Julio that Cova has a boyfriend in Alicante and Cova tells Julio that she left her boyfriend after having sex with him at Paula's house, but Julio does not want to listen to her, Cova tells Julio that she left her boyfriend after realizing that after so long she is still in love with him, Julio tells her that he no longer knows if he feels the same as her. At the end Julio goes to live with Cova in Alicante.
59	3	"Deseo"	22 September 2010
Román proposes to Yoli to appear at the casting of Los protegidos but for that he needs some photos and a video, he offers to do it and the girl accepts. The young people are getting better and better and Yoli asks Ruth to help her to be alone with him, at first she helps them and manages to get Clara out of the house to leave them alone, but at the last moment she regrets and does not they can stay. Álvaro is tired of the fact that whenever they are together it has to be when they are alone, Alma does not want to be seen together and Álvaro has realized it, gives him an ultimatum or goes with him on the excursion and makes their relationship public or it is over. She seems determined to go but at the last moment regrets it. Olimpia no longer knows what to do to be with Martín, she tries but Martín always ends up making excuses for her and it never ends the way she wants, Olimpia tells Marina, the teacher tries to help her however she can. Finally, Olimpia prepares a romantic dinner in the new house, but to her surprise, Martín has invited Clara, Olimpia gets completely angry but ends up having her long-awaited night with Martín. Ruth's relationship between Román and Yoli is getting worse, she has told him that she is increasingly caught by Roman and Ruth does not know very well what to do, Alma realizes what is happening and ends up talking to Ruth telling her to fight for if she really wants it, but she prefers to forget it. Fer wants to help David who seems to be getting worse, David wants to be with Fer but he knows that it is difficult for him, the young man has a boyfriend and is better than ever with him. Fer accompanies David to see a musical, but everything gets complicated when on leaving the venue David kisses Fer, the boy tells him that now he will no longer be able to be his friend, because he cannot have a friend who knows that he is in love with him. Jon wants to get closer to Salva so that he can be with Daniela, the girl continues to believe that Salva is gay, but he confesses that he is bisexual, she tries to put him to the test but the young man refuses when he sees that he wants to have an affair with a friend. Salva worries when he loses his mobile, there are photos of Daniela quite compromised, Jon does not miss the opportunity to befriend him as he wants and manages to recover Salva's mobile, the young man in a form of gratitude ends up giving in, although he actually knows that Jon wants to get closer to Daniel. While Teresa does not want her mother to continue with the lie about her relationship with Vaquero because she knows that Berto is having a bad time, in an attempt at reconciliation the young woman calls the three of them and their father in the house and locks them up, finally his father ends up accepting Verónica's relationship with three, but Berto does not want to continue and decides to leave Zurbarán.
60	4	"Segunda oportunidad"	28 September 2010
After Berto's departure, Verónica and Vaquero's relationship will undergo strong changes. Also in the Zurbarán they will have to face new economic problems. For her part, Yoli is going to different castings and is getting very involved in her new facet as an actress. In one of these tests, for the series Los protegidos Yoli has a scene with Culebra (Lucho Fernandez) that ends in an effusive kiss, which Sandra (Ana Fernández García) does not like. Meanwhile, Román continues to support her despite the fact that these projects are also going to mean some small sacrifices. Salva and Jon are starting to get along very well thanks to their pact for Jon to conquer Daniela, but Salva must face the dilemma, keep Jon's friendship or win Daniela's heart. Fer, knowing what the boy really wants, tries to make Salva open his eyes and react, since he will lose what he loves most if he continues down that path. Someone very important in Martín's past is going to make an unexpected appearance at the Zurbarán: Arturo, an old friend and one of the people who knew the director best in his day.
61	5	"Crisis"	5 October 2010
Yoli's television premiere brings nearly all of her friends together to support the burgeoning actress. But some details will make the moment a bit bittersweet. For her part, Ruth, knowing that Clara and Ricardo like each other, decides to provoke small encounters between them, determined to help her adoptive mother open her heart after so long. The economic crisis not only shakes Zurbarán, but also his students: Paula will have to face new family complications and will have to make somewhat tough decisions. On the other hand, Fer begins to worry about David when he discovers something that his ex is going to flatly refuse to assimilate and that may be caused by his latest excesses and revelry. Will Fer take action on the matter? Or will she decide to leave her former boyfriend at the mercy of the cruel and possible consequences of his vices? Olimpia discovers a little secret about Martín and cannot help but become obsessed, finding in Marina a good confidant. The Philosophy woman feels closer and closer to Arturo, but also more fearful of the moment when he discovers her illness. Would he reject her if he learned her secret?
62	6	"Excursión"	12 October 2010
Salva, putting aside his true interests and forgetting his feelings, helps Jon find out how Daniela really feels about him. Despite the originality of the idea to achieve your goals, some misunderstandings will arise that will further complicate the situation. In addition, 1º B students go on an excursion for a job in Biology, during which various collisions or even accidents will arise that will imply changes between some of them. David continues with his revelries, without worrying about his studies, and he will begin to seriously harm his friends, especially Fer, who will end up finding himself between a rock and a hard place because of his ex, having to choose between what is right and what that interests David the most. For their part, Álvaro and Alma continue with their passionate relationship, but he begins to be interested in taking a new and logical course in the couple. Will Alma accept? Olimpia and Martín begin their therapy, but the solutions proposed by the psychologist will not seem too effective or logical to her. Meanwhile, Vaquero becomes more and more obsessed with what may happen between Verónica and Jorge.
63	7	"Táctica y estrategia"	19 October 2010
Paula takes important measures to try to solve her financial problems at home, and thus, at least, to be able to continue in the Zurbarán and also to be able to support Isaac, her baby. This will lead her to meet Diego, a fellow with whom something more than friendship will emerge, but with whom she will not be able to be entirely sincere from the beginning. All the boys are very worried about David after the last consequences of his drunkenness and the argument he had with Fer the other night. Meanwhile, Ruth begins to tire of the situation with Roman, since the tension between them is not only damaging the coexistence, but also other people like Yoli or even Clara. The tension between Olimpia and Martín is putting the relationship between the two in greater danger, especially after the surprising discovery that Olimpia has just made. Some circumstances will not allow Clara to continue avoiding Ricardo, which Ruth will see as a new signal for a new attempt at rapprochement between the two.
64	8	"Confesiones que nunca llegan"	26 October 2010
Yoli believes that the tension between Ruth and Roman comes from bad coexistence, so she considers interceding between the two, although they consider being honest once and for all, although it is not as easy as it might seem. Between Jon and Salva certain misunderstandings arise derived from the lie of the second regarding his sexual orientation. This causes a small confrontation that makes Marina suspect that Salva is being bullied by his friend. When Paula decides to take charge of collecting the money for the end-of-year trip, it is not expected that someone will take advantage of the situation to such an extent that the initiative is in danger of being canceled. Verónica is obsessed with the fact that Teresa likes the least suitable man at the moment, so she will try to find a way to make her daughter forget about him and focus on the most suitable boys for her age. For his part, Martín wants to find Sandra anyway so that she can face her responsibilities as a mother.
65	9	"Lo peor de nosotros"	2 November 2010
Jon finds it difficult to accept and face his girl's friendship with him, now that he knows Salva's best kept secret. Verónica is also thinking a lot about the situation that has arisen in her house, since Teresa has fallen in love with the least suitable man for her. Verónica wants to end this strange tension as soon as possible, although she seems to be the only one who really takes it seriously. David finally returns to school, after his expulsion and his accident, although not everyone is going to receive him as he hopes. Although he is going to do everything he can to show that he has changed, and he is even going to be the main promoter of an original idea that will help Zurbarán on his way to the big day of the musical. A new obstacle is going to get in the way of Clara's relationship with Ricardo, while Martín is not coping very well with some of the inconveniences of parenthood.
66	10	"Cuando todo cobre sentido"	9 November 2010
The nerves at the Zurbarán are on the surface: the great day when the boys are going to join forces performing their musical revision of "Romeo and Juliet" has already arrived. How will the expected performance go after so much effort? Will they win the championship or will the illusions of the boys be truncated by not achieving their goal? But not all are joys and emotions, since after the betrayal of Yoli, Román and Ruth are seeing the consequent reactions both from the young woman and from other friends and colleagues. Martín and Olimpia have to face the new style of coexistence, with two young children and a relationship that is not what it was by far. Although Martin does not expect the new turn that arises in his fatherhood. In his problems with Daniela, Jon decides to also include an innocent Salva, hoping that his friend will solve the difficulties that Jon has been looking for himself, using a small mistake from Salva's past.
67	11	"En una despedida"	16 November 2010
Although everyone already knows the great secret of Ruth and Román, they still try to hide it from Clara for fear of her reaction and the possible repercussions. How long can they hide it from their foster mother? Clara, for her part, may fall into a trap again or quite the opposite: distrust someone just because she pays more attention to certain fears and circumstances, rather than her heart. Paula is mulling over the offer she received recently. Fer's protectionism can be an advantage, but also, at times, a big drawback. The 2º B boys are preparing for the Selectivity exams, so the nerves couldn't be more obvious. Some even begin to become so overwhelmed that they even take for granted their inability to move on, even considering not even introducing themselves. Finally, Martín has just found himself at home in a somewhat uncomfortable and seemingly unreal situation. So much so that you still can't believe it.
68	12	"Decisiones"	23 November 2010
The boys begin to receive some marks from the exams and, logically, not everything is joy, although the effort and the desire to improve are often rewarded. On the other hand, some will be presented with difficult opportunities to reject, having to make difficult decisions: either play it safe and easier, or fight for true dreams. Álvaro's new tactic with Teresa and Alma is going to be difficult to keep a secret, although he is going to do everything possible to keep his plan going. In addition, a new and unexpected tenant arrives at Vaquero, Verónica and Jorge's house, but the last two are not very happy with this new company. The bad vibes between Jon and Salva at the moment is more than palpable, but there are more important things to think about, such as the good vibes of Daniela and Álvaro, which bothers Jon especially.
69	13	"Carpe Diem (Parte 1)"	30 November 2010
Faced with the compromising proposal that Borja made to Fer, he is on edge because of the importance of the matter. What will Fer do? Will your decision be the correct one? Will it follow your heart? Now that everything seemed calm between Ruth and Roman, a new impediment is going to arise between them, which will shake the foundations of the couple. Meanwhile, Alma and Álvaro are going to be stunned when he realizes a big mistake, the consequences of which could be catastrophic not only for them. The new tenant in Vaquero's house causes a lot of tension in the coexistence for Jorge and Verónica. In his desperation for the debts of the house and the school, Martín is going to make decisions that will not please everyone. Will he be able to amend it?
70	14	"Carpe Diem (Parte 2)"	14 December 2010
Fer has just announced his big decision over the radio waves, and he wants to take the step as soon as possible. Everyone gets to work, although they will have to face some complications not only due to immediacy, but due to circumstances. Yoli, as a good organizer, will have a great idea, but for this she will need the support of someone very special. But in this story there is a third party in contention, a David in love who is going through one of the worst moments of his life. Gorka can't take it anymore. She wants to get Paula and little Isaac Jr. back, although it is very difficult for her to forgive their inexplicable disappearance for months. What is Gorka hiding? Why did you break off your relationship so drastically and now reappear still in love and repentant? Will Paula be able to forgive him? Hiding their relationship secretly from Teresa becomes increasingly complicated for Álvaro and Alma. Is it time for Álvaro to stop playing two bands and decide once and for all who he really wants? Daniela finds herself in the same circumstances, who has to settle her situation with Salva and Jon before unleashing in an unpleasant situation.

=== Season 7 (2011) ===
No. overall	No. in season	Title	Original release date
71	1	"Revolución"	5 May 2011
A new year begins at the Zurbarán and during these summer months each of the characters has taken a different path, especially after Jon's fatal accident. On the one hand, Daniela and Teresa have formed the side of the bad girls and they walk through the corridors of the school eating the world. Teresa has undergone a huge change and the summer months have made her wake up to her most radical adolescence. Alma and Yoli, meanwhile, are still the most veteran of the Zurbarán and will not let themselves be trampled by them so easily. Meanwhile, the boys are dedicated to showing who is the strongest in the school. Jon, after the accident he suffered, also returns with a desire for revenge, since he has spent the whole summer in a coma. When you wake up you will only want to remember the good things that were in your life before, among them, your girlfriend Daniela or your friend Salva. However, things have changed in these months. As for the teachers, they will join forces against Enrique, the new director of the school, who does not mince words and is a strictly correct and orderly man. His first rules will raise blisters among students and teachers will not know how to stop him. The only way to do that is by joining the students, and Yoli could be an exemplary student representative. Finally, Xavi, the new art teacher, will arrive covering Jorge's absence, who will not return to school after breaking his relationship with Verónica this summer. Now the teacher will only want a little peace at home, however, this will be truncated when Vaquero sneaks his wife Sara into the house, a very pretty and uninhibited girl who will give him more than one headache.
72	2	"Espectáculo"	12 May 2011
Verónica is very concerned about Teresa's crazy attitude. Xavi promises to help him, and although his intentions are good, his manners are not the best, especially when he meets the girl in class with enough students with whom he has hooked up to make her see that his attitude is going beyond promiscuity. The girl, totally offended, will talk to Enrique to take action. Meanwhile, Sara will be more subtle in making her see that a certain goal is worth more than a thousand wrong ones, the girl will stare at Roman, the attraction is clear. For their part, David and Fer discover how difficult it is to make ends meet, they need work, but things are very difficult. David has an opportunity from heaven when he meets Susana, his ex-girlfriend, who offers to work in her hairdresser in exchange for his closeness, and the girl always had David very present and now he will not dare to tell her openly that he is homosexual. On the other hand, the two of them will not be the only ones who have problems with the house when Román receives a call from Clara saying that he needs to sell the house. Roman will offer to pay half of the couple's rent in exchange for a room.
73	3	"Desnudos"	18 May 2011
Yoli has managed to be the Zurbarán student delegate on her own merits, but Daniela is not going to make it easy for her. Taking advantage of his friendship with Enrique, he manages to take charge of a school newspaper from which Daniela hopes to control her classmates and take revenge for Yoli's electoral victory. But the hardest hit will be Salva, the center of Jon's wrath and Zurbarán's new group of baddies. Instigated by Álvaro, Jon will fight Salva for the position of graphic humorist in the newspaper, and he will do it by giving him where it hurts the most. The newspaper will also be the center of the hurricane for Sara and Verónica. The literature teacher does not finish swallowing her new roommate, but she will have to join her in organizing the new after school activity. Meanwhile, Xavi is not satisfied with one being able to have them at both, and uses a portrait contest as an excuse to get closer to Verónica, while continuing his relationship with Sara. Both feel special because of the attentions of the artist, but secrets are not easy to keep in the teachers' homes, and the truth will come out in an embarrassing way for all three. The differences between Olimpia and Enrique are accentuated with the appearance of Peque, a gypsy student who wants to fight against the stereotype and study to carve out a future for herself. What for Olimpia is an example of determination, for Enrique is nothing more than an opportunity to promote the educational excellence of the school. The director again imposes his criteria, but it will be Peque who pays the consequences.
74	4	"Contenido y forma"	25 May 2011
David's dreams with his ex-girlfriend continue, although he doesn't dare to tell Fer anything. However, he knows it, but exactly the same thing happens to him as David: he has no idea how to deal with the problem. Fortunately, they have Yoli to give them a hand and find out if David is feeling something for his ex again or is something different. The couple once again face an obstacle of unknown consequences. Jon has been crowned as the most charismatic of the Zurbarán students thanks to his alter ego in the newspaper "The Devil on Wheels" and his fans are multiplying. Álvaro can't help but look at him with some envy despite being Jon's friend. This will lead him to try to prove to everyone that he can be as tough as Jon or more. On the other hand, Teresa, despite her new status together with Daniela, still has a pending account with Alma that she wants to settle. He decides to attack her head-on, but Alma is not an easy enemy, and she easily escapes from each Teresa's onslaught. But Alma is more concerned about leaving behind her flirtation with prostitution that has made her money enough to go to the United States. Has everything under control as long as someone does not remove the matter. Someone like Teresa. In class, Verónica, fed up with her students' spelling mistakes, decides to suspend everyone who makes them. This generates a conflict between teachers and students, in which Yoli will have to put her talent as a delegate to the test to agree with all her classmates in what they consider an injustice. But Verónica also has other problems in her head. Coexistence in the apartment with Xavi and Sara has been complicated after the incidents of the previous chapter. While trying to make peace, he discovers that Xavi and Sara are continuing their adventure. Annoyed, she turns to Vaquero to separate the couple. After all, Verónica is interested in Xavi and Vaquero is interested in Sara. The challenge for Verónica will be not to betray her new philosophy of doing things calmly, and not like crazy. At the same time, Olimpia blames Enrique that Peque, Zurbarán's new gypsy student, has dropped out of school. Enrique denies any responsibility, considering that he did what he had to do. Olimpia sets herself the challenge of getting Peque back to class and teaching Enrique a lesson.
75	5	"Nunca te olvides de mi nombre"	1 June 2011
Jon and Álvaro's group continues to be the most feared in Zurbarán. They do not pass one or the members of his gang, especially Toño, a timid student who does not allow himself to be helped by his parents or teachers. His life is a hell in which he lives locked up by his own decision, and in which Jon and Álvaro, his supposed friends, are in his opinion the culprits. This will lead him to make a decision that will make all the plots converge in a frenetic and harrowing adventure in which everything will be put in danger for each and every one of the characters. Everything including their own lives. The separation of Fer and David seems to have no going back. At least that's what Fer deduces from seeing that David has accepted her with complete resignation. And this, as he confesses to his friends, annoys him a lot. So if you are not sure, you will have to be the one to take the step to try again. However, this time it is David who is not willing to put up with any more indecisions. In turn, Teresa is very taken aback by the discovery that Alma works in a hostess club. In his campaign to get back on track, he doesn't want to share this information with Daniela, but he doesn't know what to do with her either. Tired of Román not trusting that he wants to change, he tells him what happened with Alma so that he understands why he has not asked for forgiveness. Yet someone else finds out just the person who loved Alma the most: Álvaro. Teresa also wants to fix things with her mother, but that doesn't seem easy either. Verónica, after having slept with Xavi, is not willing to share it with Sara. This obsession will lead her to leave her daughter aside and confront Sara in a disproportionate way. It will not take long for you to realize that behind all this are your personal demons, you have an unresolved past that can lead you to lose the things that really matter. Meanwhile, Olimpia is beginning to discover the more human side of Enrique after he recognized that the effort he made to recover Peque for school gave him a lesson. He's definitely starting to like it. But he still has to discover the detail that will show the most tender Enrique, even if this generates a new conflict.
76	6	"Te veo"	6 June 2011
One of the first consequences is the measure adopted by Enrique to definitively solve the Zurbarán's security. The principal has decided to install surveillance cameras and a metal detector at the school. The measure causes the outrage of students and teachers, who are not willing to be controlled or lose their right to privacy. Alma, Salva and Román lead the opposition to Enrique's measures trying to boycott camera surveillance by all means. After what happened, Jon and Álvaro have become the "sick" of the school. Jon feels very guilty and wants to earn people's forgiveness. Instead, Álvaro prefers to escape his deepest feelings by pounding his body in the gym and discarding any attempt to apologize to anyone. This difference in attitudes will cause a confrontation between the two. Yoli and David suffer the loss of Fer very differently. On the one hand, Yoli tries to hold onto the memory of Fer obsessively. It has been proposed that no one forget him and, for that very reason, he is in charge of organizing a tribute in his memory at the school. On the other hand, David tries to continue with his life, something that is impossible since Yoli constantly tries to remind him of Fer's presence. Besides, Yoli controls David's life obsessively, as if Fer continues to remain among them. A situation that will be about to end their friendship. Alma continues to work at the Rodeo Bar, something that may change soon, when she discovers that one of the clients is an acquaintance ... more specifically, a professor at Zurbarán. Teresa and Román feel more and more attracted to each other. But Teresa does not finish letting herself be carried away by her feelings. In addition, Daniela, who does not see the rapprochement between the two as good, will not stop discrediting Roman and judging Teresa's desire. After having been absent for two months, Verónica rejoins the classes. But going back to the classroom is not going to be easy for her, since Verónica continues to suffer the aftermath of post-traumatic shock. With the help of Arturo, he will try to overcome the panic caused by entering the school again. Xavi and Sara have formalized their relationship in recent months, but doubts about his decision begin to assail the teacher and he begins to neglect his relationship with her. Sara, who is not willing to allow anyone to sit her down, especially if it is a romantic dinner, decides to take drastic measures: find a replacement.
77	7	"Si pudiera volver atrás"	13 June 2011
Daniela's thirst for revenge after Teresa's rudeness for Román, will lead her to want to do the greatest possible damage to the couple. And for that he will decide to play his best trick: the tape that he stole from Verónica. But things take an unexpected turn, when Daniela accidentally discovers that Enrique has finally bought the school and plans to tear it down to use the grounds. A fact that will take place in two weeks if nobody prevents it. Daniela will immediately sound the alarm and all Zurbarán will mobilize against Enrique, with Yoli and Olimpia at the helm. The latter, who believed that she had finally managed to get closer to him, will take it personally and, with Sara's help, will propose a general strike that will affect both students and teachers. All the protagonists will decide to stay to sleep in the Zurbarán to increase the pressure towards Enrique, since he will try by all means that the strike is not public so that his buyer does not back down. Sara will be one of the main leaders of the strike, something that will distance her even more from Xavi, who does not share his girlfriend's revolutionary impulses. The gap will become untenable for both of them, and they will finally end up admitting that who they want to be with is with Vaquero and Verónica respectively. But things will not be easy, Verónica does not seem to be very busy starting a relationship and for Sara things will get even more complicated when immigration agents discover that her marriage is a sham and decide to deport her to Argentina. The situation between David and Jon will remain red hot, and having to share space 24 hours a day will not make it any easier. Jon will end up making a desperate decision to get his forgiveness even if doing so endangers his physical integrity. Things will not be easy for Álvaro either, he will decide to get Alma out of prostitution at all costs, even if it means doing a lot of damage to the person he loves the most. On the other hand, Teresa and Román will get closer and closer, and it will be Román's new job as a photographer, which will finally make them both confess what they feel for each other. In this race against time to save Zurbarán, all conflicts will break out one by one, leading the protagonists to make drastic decisions that will affect their future forever.

== Broadcasters ==
Country/Region	Broadcaster	Series premiere	Local title
Spain	Antena 3	4 February 2008	Física o Química
Latin America	Antena 3	8 February 2008	Física o Química
Quebec	TOU.TV	2012	Physique ou Chimie
France	NRJ 12	24 August 2009	Physique ou Chimie
Italy	Rai 4	4 September 2010	Fisica o Chimica
Portugal	MTV Portugal	2010	Física ou Química
Portugal	SIC Radical	2011-2012	Físico-Química
Portugal	SIC K	2019	Física ou Química
Costa Rica	Cadena 2	2011	Física o Química
Honduras	HTV	25 June 2011 and 5 November 2012	Física o Quimica
Bulgaria	bTV	2 August 2011	Физика или Химия; Fisika ili Himiya

== Reunion ==
A two-episode reunion miniseries, Física o Química: El reencuentro, starring Andrea Duro, Maxi Iglesias, Gonzalo Ramos, Angy Fernández, Adam Jezierski, Javier Calvo, Adrián Rodríguez, Sandra Blázquez, Ana Milán, Marc Clotet, Leonor Martín, Andrés Cheung, Álex Barahona, Blanca Romero and José Lamuño, premiered on 27 December 2020 on streaming platform Atresplayer Premium.
