= Verbo =

- Theatrical release poster
- Directed by: Eduardo Chapero-Jackson
- Written by: Eduardo Chapero-Jackson
- Produced by: Belén Atienza; Álvaro Augustín; Ghislain Barrois; Jesús de la Vega; Enrique López Lavigne
- Starring: Alba García; Miguel Ángel Silvestre; Verónica Echegui; Víctor Clavijo; Macarena Gómez; Adam Jezierski; Nasser Saleh; Najwa Nimri; Djédjé Apali
- Cinematography: Juan Carlos Gómez
- Edited by: Elena Ruiz
- Production companies: Apaches Entertainment; Telecinco Cinema
- Distributed by: Filmax
- Release dates: September 22, 2011 (Donostia-San Sebastian Festival); November 4, 2011 (Spain)
- Country: Spain
- Language: Spanish

Verbo is a Spanish dark fantasy thriller film written and directed by Eduardo Chapero-Jackson.

== Plot ==
A 15-year-old, Sara, lives with an apparently normal suburban family. She develops a sixth sense and begins to perceive a series of disturbing messages and clues, which prompt her to enter a dangerous and frightening dimension in order to save a life. In the course of this adventure to a dark parallel universe, Sara must change the world.

== Cast ==
- Alba García as Sara
- Miguel Ángel Silvestre as Lírico
- Najwa Nimri as Inés
- Macarena Gómez as Prosak
- Verónica Echegui as Medussa
- Nasser Saleh as Darío
- Adam Jeziersky as Foco
- Manolo Solo as Professor
- Fernando Soto as Rafa
- Víctor Clavijo as Tótem
- Michelle Asante as Night
- Peter Peralta as Japanese Teenager
- Djédjé Apali as Hermes
- Sergio Villalba as Hugo

== Production ==
Apaches Entertainment and Telecinco Cinema co-produced the thriller film for Filmax. Alba García and Miguel Angel Silvestre play the leads. It is directed by the producer of The Others, Eduardo Chapero-Jackson.

== Release ==
The release was originally set for late 2010, but was delayed. It is currently scheduled for a November 4, 2011 release after being screened at the San Sebastian Film Festival.

== See also ==
- List of Spanish films of 2011
