= Bart Santana =

Spanish actor

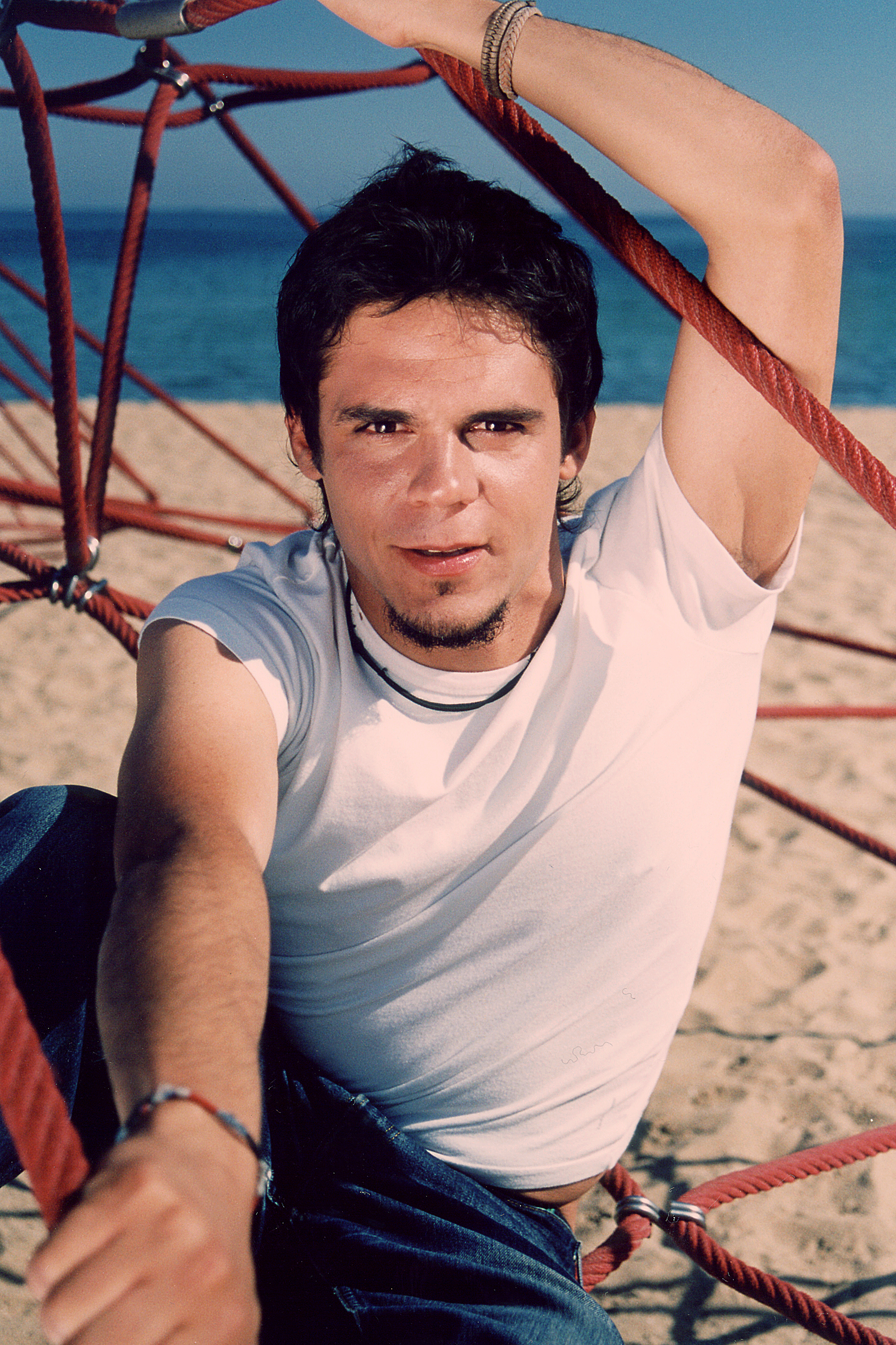
Bartolomé Santana in 2004

Bartolomé Santana (stage name, Bart Santana, Huelva, 1980) is a Spanish actor mainly known by his television roles.

He studied at the Escuela de Arte Dramático Cristina Rota, and León Ortega School of Arts.

== Filmography ==
=== Television ===
==== Regular roles ====
- Física o Química, Roque Madrona (2008–2010).
- Majoria absoluta, Jairo (2002–2004).
- Mujeres como Raúl (2006).

==== Episodic roles ====
- Compañeros Willy (2001)
- Al salir de clase (2002)
- Hospital Central (2006)
- Amar en tiempos revueltos (2006–2007)
- R.I.S. Científica Sr.Moreira(2007)
- MIR José Luis (2007)
- Cuenta atrás terrorista (2007)

=== Cinema ===
- Tu vida en 65´ (2006) Pedro
- Mataharis (2007) Antoñito
- Che: Part Two(2008) Daniel

=== Short films ===
- Diminutos del Calvario (2002) Chico Hormonal
- Feliciten al chef (2006) Teo

=== Theatre ===
- Mi primera vez (2010)
