= Karim El-Kerem =

Spanish actor (born 1987)

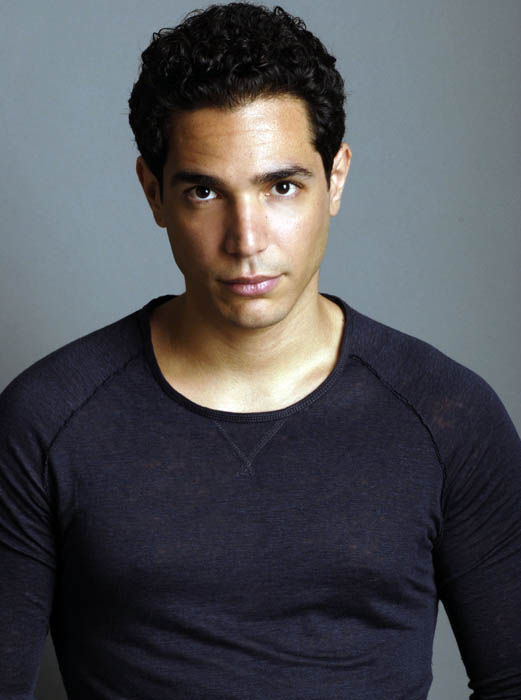
- El-Kerem in 2012
- Born: 2 November 1987 (age 38); New York City, U.S.
- Occupation: Actor
- Years active: 2007–present

Karim El Kerem (born 2 November 1987) is a Spanish actor. He is well known in Europe and Latin America for performances in such television shows as Física o Química, La reina del sur, Velvet Colección. And films as No Rest for the Wicked.

== Career ==
Karim El Kerem was born in Brooklyn, New York to a Spanish mother and an Egyptian father. When he was one year old he moved to Spain with his family.

El Kerem studied acting at Juan Carlos Corazza's Studio, and began his professional acting career in 2008 with his role as Isaac on the Spanish television show Física o Química. He was also a recurring guest star in the television show Pasapalabra.

In 2011 he played Mohamed, son of Fátima Mansur, in the telenovela La reina del sur, for Telemundo and Antena 3.

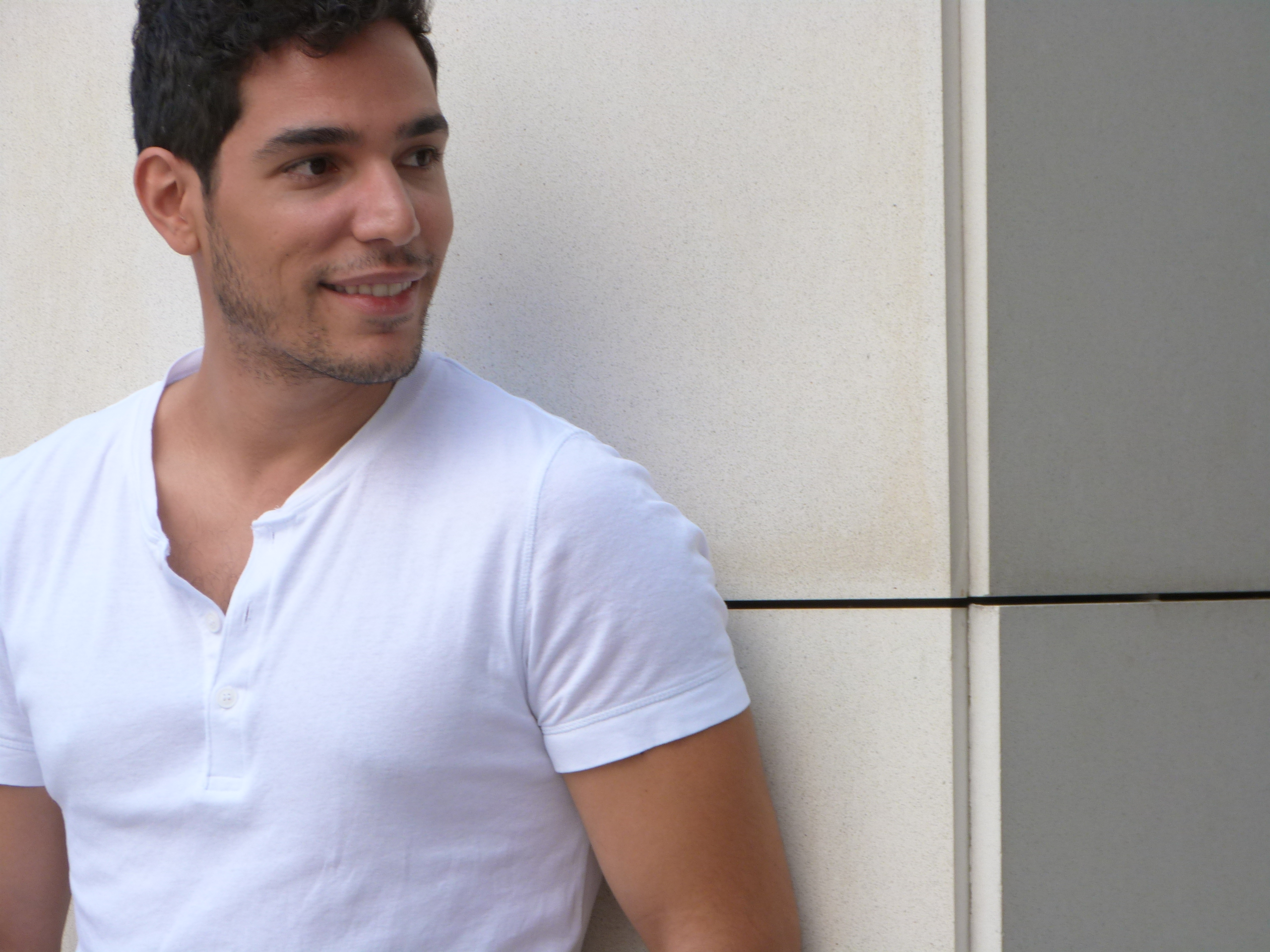
El Kerem at the Tv show "Frágiles" Premiere

El-Kerem also appeared in the 2011 film No Rest for the Wicked directed by Enrique Urbizu. Film winner of six Goya Awards.

In 2012, Karim had a role in the television show Frágiles for Telecinco.

In 2014 he played Kamal in the tv Show "El Príncipe" for Telecinco.

In 2018 El Kerem had a supporting role in "Velvet Colección" and appeared in Centro Médico.

Karim is filming the tv show "La Unidad" for Movistar+.

== Television ==
Year	TV Show	Character	Company
2020	La unidad	Munir	Movistar+
2018	Centro médico	Jabir	TVE
2018	Velvet Colección	Omar Ahmadi Assistant	Movistar+
2014	El Príncipe	Kamal	Telecinco
2012–2013	Frágiles	Nacho	Telecinco
2011	La reina del sur	Mohamed Mansur	Telemundo and Antena 3
2010	La pecera de Eva	David	Telecinco
2008–2009	Física o Química	Isaac	Antena 3

== Film ==
Year	Film	Character	Director
2011	No habrá paz para los malvados	Young Handsome Guy	Enrique Urbizu
2009	El Discípulo	Thomas	Emilio Ruiz
