= Leonor Martín =

Spanish actress

- Born: Leonor Martín Taibo; 1 August 1989 (age 36); Madrid, Spain
- Occupation: Actress
- Years active: 2005–present

Leonor Martín Taibo (born 1 August 1989 in Madrid) is a Spanish architect and actress known for playing Cova in the popular series Física o Química.

== Professional career ==
Leonor Martín made her film debut in 2005 with the movie El penalti más largo del mundo in 2005.

She made her television debut in the series Física o Química in 2008, where she played Covadonga Ariste Espinel, better known as Cova, until the third season as the main character. She returned in the fifth season until the seventh season as a recurring character and as a guest character.

In 2011 she joined El secreto de Puente Viejo, playing Gregoria Casas, the new town doctor.

In cinema, she has participated as a cameo in the films Muertos de amor and as a supporting character in En apatía: Secuelas del odio. She also participated in the film Madrid, above the Moon.

In 2015 she filmed the series Aula de castigo.

In 2020, it was confirmed that the actress would return to play Covadonga Ariste Espinel in Física o químicaː El reencuentro for its Atresplayer Premium platform.

In January 2021, after participating in Física o químicaː El reencuentro it was announced that she would join the daily series Acacias 38 to play Dori Navarro.

== Filmography ==
=== Cinema ===
Year	Film	Character	Directed by
2005	El penalti más largo del mundo	Pava 2	Roberto Santiago
2013	Muertos de amor	Waitress	Mikel Aguirresarobe
2014	En Apatía: Secuelas del Odio	Paula	Joel Arellanes Duran
2016	Madrid, Above the Moon		Miguel Santesmases
2022	Margarita en la luna	Clara (voice)	Julio Medem

=== Television series ===
Year	Title	Character	Channel	Duration
2008–2011	Física o Química	Covadonga "Cova" Ariste Espinel	Antena 3	28 episodes
2011–2014	El secreto de Puente Viejo	Dra. Gregoria Casas	Antena 3	235 episodes
2015	Aula de castigo	Sara	Vimeo	6 episodes
2020–2021	Física o químicaː El reencuentro	Covadonga "Cova" Ariste Espinel	Atresplayer Premium	2 episodes
2021	Acacias 38	Adoración "Dori" Navarro Bellido	TVE	67 episodes
2022	Los protegidos: El regreso	Covadonga "Cova" Ariste Espinel	Atresplayer Premium	1 episode

=== Short films ===
Year	Title	Character	Directed by
2013	Afterzombies: El fin de los zombies		Guillermo Arribas Cobián
2016	Abuelo	Clara	Borja Muñoz Gallego
2017	Z FEST	Ruth	David Cordero
2022	Meraki	Sara	Cristina Subirats
