= Sandra Blázquez =

Spanish actress

- Born: 23 January 1987 (age 39); Madrid, Spain
- Occupation: Actress
- Years active: since 1998
- Known for: Cambio de Clase (2006–2008); Física o Química (2009–2011); Acacias 38 (2016–2017)

Sandra Blázquez (born 23 January 1987) is a Spanish television actress. Throughout her career, she has starred in several long-running series, including Al salir de clase (1998), Física o Química (2009–2011), and Acacias 38 (2016–2017).

In addition to working as an actress, Blázquez runs an organization helping poor children in northern Kenya with her friend María Fábregas, who is a social educator.

== Filmography ==
Television

- Al salir de clase as Fabiola.
- La vida de Rita as Rosarito.
- Cambio de clase as Luna.
- Física o Química as Alma.
- Tierra de lobos as Luz.
- Vive cantando as María José.
- Acacias 38 as Huertas López.
