= Álex Martínez (actor) =

Spanish actor (born 1991)

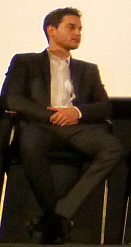
- Álex Martínez during the discussion after the broadcast of the last chapter of the second season of the series Isabel in theaters in 2013.
- Born: Alejandro Martínez Fernández; September 28, 1991 (age 34); Palma, Majorca, Spain
- Occupation: Actor
- Years active: 2006-present
- Height: 1.78 m (5 ft 10 in)

Alejandro Martínez Fernández (September 28, 1991 in Palma, Majorca, Spain), known professionally as Álex Martínez, is a Spanish actor. He is best known for his roles of Salvador “Salva” Quintanilla in the Antena 3 Teen drama series Física o Química and Boabdil of Granada in the historical fiction series of Televisión Española Isabel.

== Filmography ==
=== Television ===
Year	Title	Character	Channel	Notes
2006	Laberint de passions	Nico	IB3	4 episodes
2009	Yo soy Bea	Rubén	Telecinco	3 episodes
2009	Doctor Mateo	Germán Orozco	Antena 3	1 episodes
2010	La pecera de Eva	Ulises Bermejo	LaSiete	7 episodes
2010-2011	Física o Química	Salvador "Salva" Quintanilla	Antena 3	22 episodes
2011-2013	Bandolera	Jairo Flores	Antena 3	328 episodes
2013	Isabel	Boabdil of Granada	La 1	10 episodes
2014-2015	Amar es para siempre	Francisco Américo Díaz Garcilán	Antena 3	247 episodes
2015	Aula de castigo	Javier "Javi" Rodríguez	Vimeo	6 episodes
2016	Bajo sospecha	Rafael "Rafi" Martínez Abad	Antena 3	6 episodes
2016	Víctor Ros	Aitor "Tormenta" Menta	La 1	1 episode
2017	Morocco: Love in Times of War	Román	Antena 3	4 episodes
2020	Pep	Miquel	IB3	8 episodes

=== Movies ===
Year	Movie	Character	Director
2008	El juego del ahorcado	Basketball boy #1	Manuel Gómez Pereira
2015	Las ovejas no pierden el tren	Ricardo	Álvaro Fernández Armero
2019	Escape Room	Football Player	Adam Robitel

=== Theater ===
Year	Title	Character	Director	Theater
2009	William	Pedro/Romeo/Macbeth		Escuela Municipal de Teatro de Mallorca
2018	Bosco	Bosco		Sala Intemperie en Madrid
