= Nasser Saleh =

Spanish actor (born 1992)

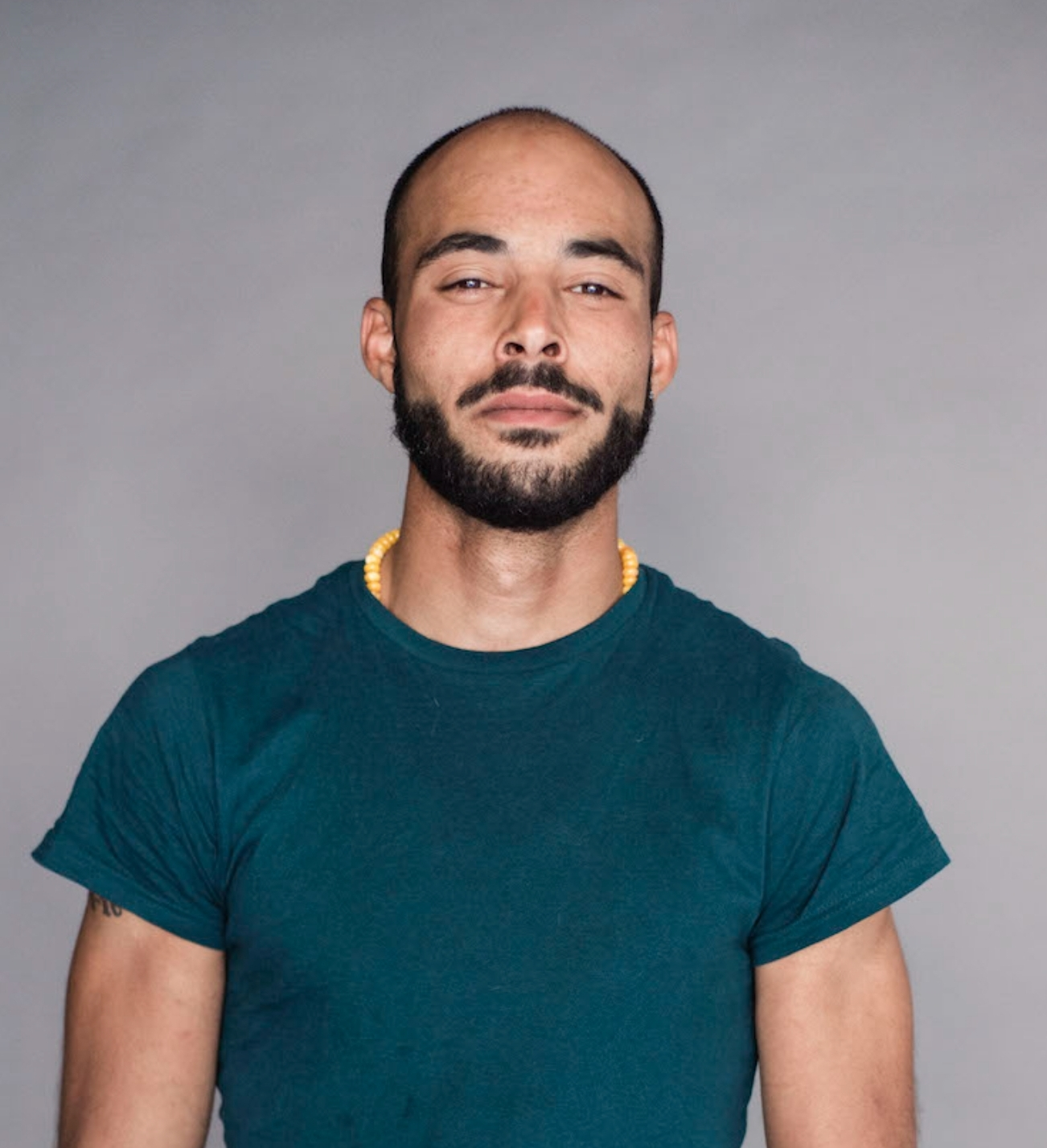
- Born: Nasser Saleh Ibrihim; 19 December 1992 (age 33); Lanzarote, Spain
- Occupation: Actor
- Height: 1.75 m (5 ft 9 in)

Nasser Saleh (born 19 December 1992) is a Spanish actor. He is best known for his role as Román Lorente on the Spanish television show Física o Química. In 2010, he appeared in the Oscar nominated film Biutiful along with fellow Spanish actor Javier Bardem.

== Personal life ==
He was born on 19 December 1992. Saleh is of Moroccan descent and is fluent in Spanish and Arabic.

== Filmography ==
Film and Series Television
Year	Title	Role	Notes
2008	Fuera de lugar		5 episodes
2008–2009	HKM: hablan, kantan, mienten	Moja	85 episodes
2010	Propios y extraños		
2010	La pecera de Eva	Leo	58 episodes
2010–2011	Física o química	Román Lorente	30 episodes
2010	Biutiful	Muchacho	
2011	11-M		TV-Movie
2011	Verbo	Darío	
2011	No habrá paz para los malvados (No Rest for the Wicked)		
2013	I'm So Excited	Joven étnico	
2014	El Príncipe	Karim	
