= 58th David di Donatello =

2013 Italian film awards

- Date: 14 June 2013
- Site: Teatro 5 Dear, Rome, Italy
- Hosted by: Lillo & Greg

Highlights
- Best Picture: The Best Offer
- Most awards: The Best Offer (6)
- Most nominations: The Best Offer and Diaz – Don't Clean Up This Blood (13)

Television coverage
- Network: Rai Movie

The 58th David di Donatello ceremony, presented by the Accademia del Cinema Italiano, was held on 14 June 2013.

== Winners and nominees ==
Best Film: The Best Offer – directed by Giuseppe Tornatore; Diaz – Don't Clean Up This Blood – directed by Daniele Vicari; Siberian Education – directed by Gabriele Salvatores; Me and You – directed by Bernardo Bertolucci; Long Live Freedom – directed by Roberto Andò	Best Producer: Domenico Procacci – Diaz – Don't Clean Up This Blood; Fabrizio Mosca – Alì Blue Eyes; Riccardo Tozzi, Giovanni Stabilini, Marco Chimenz – Siberian Education; Isabella Cocuzza, Arturo Paglia – The Best Offer; Angelo Barbagallo – Long Live Freedom
Best Director: Giuseppe Tornatore – The Best Offer; Bernardo Bertolucci – Me and You; Matteo Garrone – Reality; Gabriele Salvatores – Siberian Education; Daniele Vicari – Diaz – Don't Clean Up This Blood	Best New Director: Leonardo Di Costanzo – The Interval; Giorgia Farina – Amiche da morire; Alessandro Gassmann – The Mongrel; Luigi Lo Cascio – The Ideal City; Laura Morante – Cherry on the Cake
Best Actor: Valerio Mastandrea – Balancing Act; Aniello Arena – Reality; Sergio Castellitto – A Perfect Family; Roberto Herlitzka – The Red and the Blue; Luca Marinelli – Every Blessed Day; Toni Servillo – Long Live Freedom	Best Actress: Margherita Buy – A Five Star Life; Valeria Bruni Tedeschi – Long Live Freedom; Thony – Every Blessed Day; Tea Falco – Me and You; Jasmine Trinca – There Will Come a Day
Best Supporting Actor: Valerio Mastandrea – Long Live Freedom; Stefano Accorsi – A Five Star Life; Giuseppe Battiston – Garibaldi's Lovers; Marco Giallini – Out of the Blue; Claudio Santamaria – Diaz – Don't Clean Up This Blood	Best Supporting Actress: Maya Sansa – Dormant Beauty; Ambra Angiolini – Viva l'Italia; Anna Bonaiuto – Long Live Freedom; Rosabell Laurenti Sellers – Balancing Act; Francesca Neri – A Perfect Family; Fabrizia Sacchi – A Five Star Life
David di Donatello for Best Screenplay: Roberto Andò, Angelo Pasquini – Long Live Freedom; Niccolò Ammaniti, Umberto Contarello, Francesca Marciano, Bernardo Bertolucci – Me and You; Giuseppe Tornatore – The Best Offer; Maurizio Braucci, Ugo Chiti, Matteo Garrone, Massimo Gaudioso – Reality; Ivan Cotroneo, Francesca Marciano, Maria Sole Tognazzi – A Five Star Life	Best Cinematography: Marco Onorato – Reality; Fabio Cianchetti – Me and You; Gherardo Gossi – Diaz – Don't Clean Up This Blood; Italo Petriccione – Siberian Education; Fabio Zamarion – The Best Offer
Best Production Design: Maurizio Sabatini, Raffaella Giovannetti – The Best Offer; Paolo Bonfini – Reality; Marco Dentici – It Was the Son; Marta Maffucci – Diaz – Don't Clean Up This Blood; Rita Rabassini – Siberian Education	Best Score: Ennio Morricone – The Best Offer; Alexandre Desplat – Reality; Mauro Pagani – Siberian Education; Franco Piersanti – Me and You; Teho Teardo – Diaz – Don't Clean Up This Blood
Best Original Song: "Every Blessed Day" from Every Blessed Day – Composed by Simone Lenzi, Antonio Bardi, Giulio Pomponi, Valerio Griselli, Matteo Pastorelli, Daniele Catalucci, performed by Virginiana Miller; "Fare a meno di te" from Out of the Blue – Composed by Gianluca Misiti, Laura Marafioti, performed by La Elle; "Novij den" from Siberian Education – Composed by Mauro Pagani, performed by Dariana Koumanova; "La vita possibile" from The Mongrel – Composed by Pivio and Aldo De Scalzi with Francesco Renga, performed by Francesco Renga; "Twice Born" from Twice Born – Composed by Arturo Annecchino, performed by Angelica Ponti	Best Editing: Benni Atria – Diaz – Don't Clean Up This Blood; Clelio Benevento – Long Live Freedom; Walter Fasano – A Five Star Life; Massimo Quaglia – The Best Offer; Marco Spoletini – Reality
Best Sound: Remo Ugolinelli, Alessandro Palmerini – Diaz – Don't Clean Up This Blood; Gaetano Carito – Dormant Beauty; Fulgenzio Ceccon – Long Live Freedom; Maricetta Lombardo – Reality; Gilberto Martinelli – The Best Offer	Best Costumes: Maurizio Millenotti – The Best Offer; Patrizia Chericoni – Siberian Education; Grazia Colombini – It Was the Son; Alessandro Lai – Apartment in Athens; Roberta Vecchi, Francesca Vecchi – Diaz – Don't Clean Up This Blood
Best Digital Effects: Mario Zanot for Storyteller – Diaz – Don't Clean Up This Blood; Andrea Marotti – Dracula 3D; Paola Trisoglio, Stefano Marinoni for Visualogie – Siberian Education; Bruno Albi Marini for Wonderlab – Reality; Gianluca Dentici for Reset VFX – Long Live Freedom	Best Make-up Artist: Dalia Colli – Reality; Enrico Iacoponi – Long Live Freedom; Enrico Iacoponi, Maurizio Nardi – Siberian Education; Mario Michisanti – Diaz – Don't Clean Up This Blood; Luigi Rocchetti – The Best Offer
Best Hairstylist: Daniela Tartari – Reality; Carlo Barucci, Marco Perna – Long Live Freedom; Stefano Ceccarelli – The Best Offer; Giorgio Gregorini – Diaz – Don't Clean Up This Blood; Francesco Pegoretti – Siberian Education	Best Documentary Feature: Anija: The Ship – directed by Roland Sejko; Bad Weather – directed by Giovanni Giommi; Fratelli & sorelle – Storie di carcere – directed by Barbara Cupisti; Nadea e Sveta – directed by Maura Delpero; Pezzi – directed by Luca Ferrari
Best Short Film: L'esecuzione – directed by Enrico Iannaccone; Ammore – directed by Paolo Sassanelli; Cargo – directed by Carlo Sironi; Preti – directed by Astutillo Smeriglia; Settanta – directed by Pippo Mezzapesa	Best European Film: Amour – directed by Michael Haneke; Skyfall – directed by Sam Mendes; Anna Karenina – directed by Joe Wright; Quartet – directed by Dustin Hoffman; Rust and Bone – directed by Jacques Audiard
Best Foreign Film: Django Unchained – directed by Quentin Tarantino; Argo – directed by Ben Affleck; Silver Linings Playbook – directed by David O. Russell; Lincoln – directed by Steven Spielberg; Life of Pi – directed by Ang Lee	David Youth Award: The Best Offer – directed by Giuseppe Tornatore; The Unlikely Prince – directed by Alessandro Siani; A Perfect Family – directed by Paolo Genovese; Twice Born – directed by Sergio Castellitto; Viva l'Italia – directed by Massimiliano Bruno
Special David Awards: Vincenzo Cerami (career award)
