= FGCI =

FGCI may refer to:

- Italian Communist Youth Federation (1949-1990)
- Youth Federation of Italian Communists (2004-2014)
