= 2011 Rome demonstration =

Italian protest against economic inequality

Rome city uprising of 15 October 2011
- Part of 15 October 2011 global protests
- Date: 15 October 2011
- Location: Rome, Italy
- Caused by: Economic inequality, Corporate influence over government, Corruption in the Berlusconi's Government inter alia.
- Methods: street protesters, riot

Number
- 200,000 (approx.)

Casualties
- Injuries: 135
- Arrested: 13

On 15 October 2011 about 200,000 people gathered in Rome, Italy to protest against economic inequality and the influence of the European Commission, the European Central Bank, the International Monetary Fund on politics and also against the government of Silvio Berlusconi. The protests began in solidarity with the Spanish protests. Many other protests occurred in other Italian cities the same day.

== Movements involved ==
The demonstrations were endorsed by several political parties, trade unions and civil movements, including: Cobas, Federazione Anarchica Italiana, Youth Federation of Italian Communists, Young Communists, Purple people, Workers' Communist Party, Party of Italian Communists, Communist Refoundation Party, Left Ecology Freedom, Critical Left, the left wing of the Italian General Confederation of Labour, and many others.

== Riots ==
On the afternoon the Rome protests turned violent, as hundreds of hooded protesters arrived on the scene and broke away from the otherwise peaceful demonstration, setting cars and a police van on fire, smashing bank windows and clashed with police. A Catholic church was ransacked and a statue of the Madonna was thrown into the street where it was stomped on by one of the rioters. Two news crews from Sky Italia were also assaulted. Police repeatedly fired tear gas and water cannons at the protesters. At least 135 people were injured, including 105 police officers. Twelve people were arrested the same day, and another one on 17 October.

It was later determined that the damage from the rioting amounted to €1.815 million, with €1 million tied to the Public Works Department.

== See also ==
- 15 October 2011 global protests
- 2010–2011 Greek protests
- 2011 Chilean protests
- 2011 Israeli middle class protests
- 2011 Spanish protests (Spanish 15M Indignants movement)
- Anti-austerity movement in the United Kingdom
- Iceland Kitchenware Revolution
- List of global Occupy movement protest locations
- List of protests in the 21st century
- Lobbying
- Occupy movement
- Occupy Wall Street
- Plutocracy
- Protests of 1968
