= South Is Nothing =

2013 film

- Directed by: Fabio Mollo
- Screenplay by: Fabio Mollo; Josella Porto
- Produced by: Sebastien Msika
- Starring: Miriam Karlkvist; Vinicio Marchioni; Valentina Lodovini
- Cinematography: Debora Vrizzi
- Edited by: Filippo Montemurro
- Music by: Giorgio Giampà
- Release date: 2013
- Language: Italian

South Is Nothing (Italian: Il sud è niente) is a 2013 Italian coming of age drama film co-written and directed by Fabio Mollo, at his feature film debut.

== Plot ==
Grazia lives on the outskirts of Reggio Calabria with her father, Cristiano. She was little when her big brother, Pietro, emigrated to Germany; she has not seen him since. Cristiano told her that Pietro had died, and he never spoke of it again. One night, following an argument with her father, Grazia goes to the beach and enters the water. From the black depths of the sea, she sees a human figure emerge a figure that then vanishes into the night and she believes she recognizes her brother.

== Cast ==
- Miriam Karlkvist as Grazia
- Vinicio Marchioni as Cristiano
- Valentina Lodovini as Bianca
- Francesco Colella as Mimmo
- Giorgio Musumeci as Pietro
- Andrea Bellisario as Carmelo
- Peppe Piromalli as Tanino
- Alessandra Costanzo as Grandmother
- Silvana Luppino as Professor

== Production ==
The film was backed from the Centre national du cinéma et de l'image animée and the TorinoFilmLab and was produced by B24 Film and Madakai in collaboration with Rai Cinema. It was shot in Reggio Calabria, Gioia Tauro and Scilla.

== Release ==
The film premiered at the 2013 Toronto International Film Festival and was later screened at the Rome Film Festival and at the Berlin International Film Festival in the Generation sidebar. It was released in Italian cinemas on 5 December 2013.

== Reception ==
For this film Fabio Mollo was nominated for Nastro d'Argento for best new director and got a Globo d'Oro nomination for best directorial debut.
