= 2001 raid on Armando Diaz =

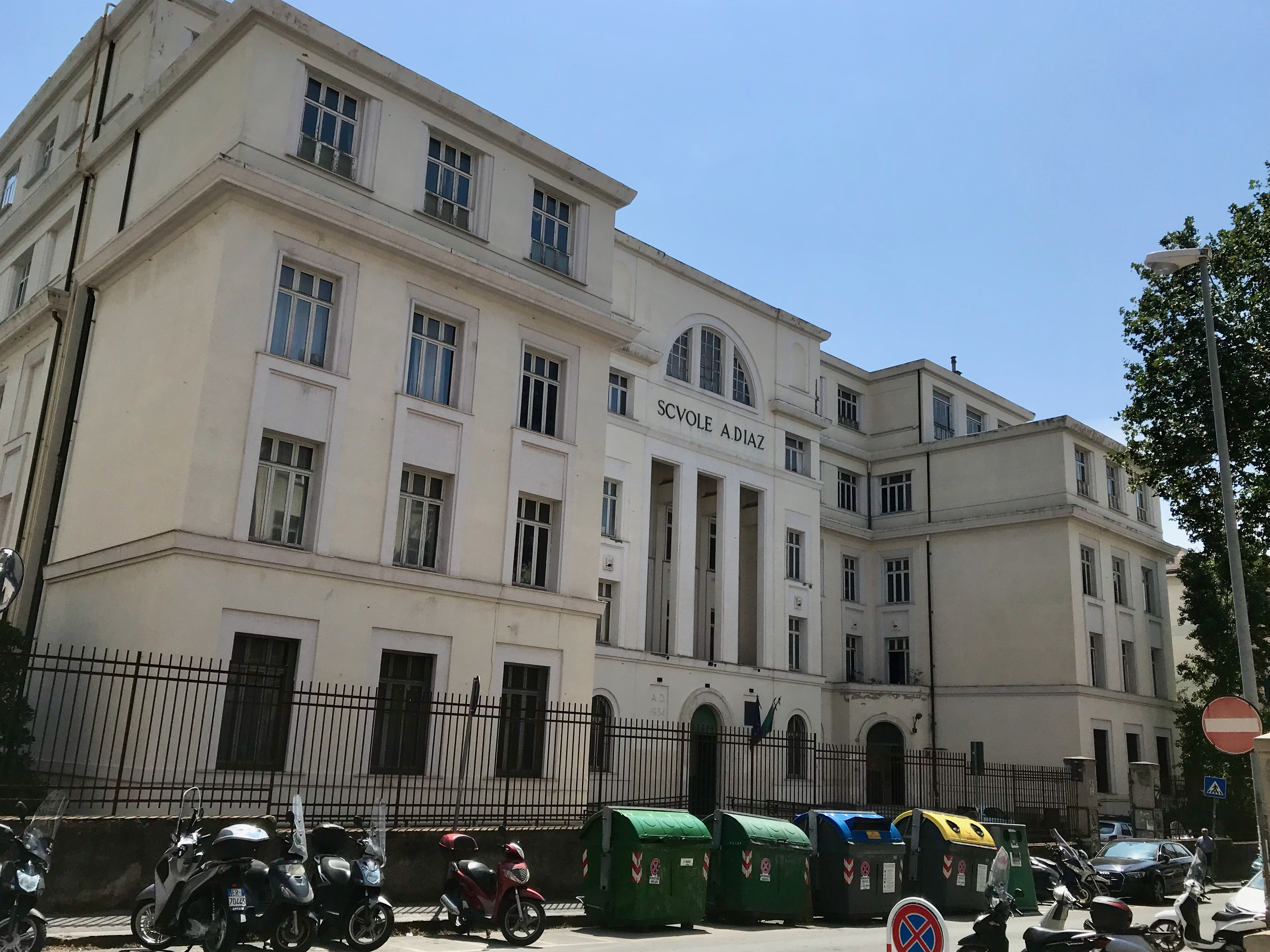
Sandro Pertini State High School ex Diaz Schools of Genoa

The raid on the "Armando Diaz" School took place during the 27th G8 meeting in Genoa in 2001 in the district of Albaro, Genoa. The school building was the temporary headquarters of the Genoa Social Forum, led by Vittorio Agnoletto. A nearby building, housing the anti-globalization organization Indymedia and lawyers affiliated with the Genoa Social Forum, was also raided. On July 21, 2001, shortly before midnight, mobile divisions of the Polizia di Stato of Genoa, Rome and Milan attacked the buildings, with the operational support of some battalions of the Carabinieri.

The police indiscriminately attacked the building's occupants, resulting in the arrest of 93 peaceful protesters; 61 were seriously injured and were taken to hospital, three of them were in a critical condition and one in a coma. Prisoners taken to a temporary detention facility in Bolzaneto were tortured and humiliated before being released. The raid resulted in the trial of 125 policemen, including managers and supervisors, for what was termed a beating from "Mexican butchery" by the assistant chief Michelangelo Fournier. None of the accused police officers were punished due to delays in the investigation and incompleteness of Italian laws under which torture was not recognised as a crime in 2001.

Prior to the raid, there had been several clashes between demonstrators and security forces. Several protesters were sleeping in the school. The numbers and designation of the security forces involved in the raid are still unknown, as they wore ski masks to hide their identities. The Court of Appeal of Genoa stated that "346 policemen, in addition to 149 Carabinieri officers were involved in the raid of the school buildings."

The raid is the subject of the 2012 film Diaz – Don't Clean Up This Blood where the attack and subsequent torture of detainees is recreated. On April 7, 2015, the European Court of Human Rights ruled that Italy had violated the European Convention on Human Rights at the 2001 G8 and ordered compensation for a protester beaten by the police. Earlier, the Italian government compensated a British journalist who had been beaten by the police. Amnesty International defined the raid as "the most serious human rights suspension in Europe", after World War II.

== The raid ==
The police raid on the school, which housed protesters linked to the Genoa Social Forum, took place a few minutes before midnight when most guests were already asleep. The raid was initiated by mobile police units from Rome, followed by more units from Genoa and Milan. Battalions of the Carabinieri did not actively participate in the raid, but limited themselves to surround the perimeter and areas adjacent to the school. Mark Covell, a British journalist, was the first person who met the police outside the building and was assaulted, leaving him in a coma. During the raid the police violently attacked those who were in the school, injuring 82 people out of a total of 93 arrested. Among the arrested, 63 were taken to hospital and 19 were taken to the police station of Bolzaneto. According to the reconstruction of events given in subsequent investigations, evidence was planted after the raid to justify the brutality of the raid. Senior police officers planted two Molotov cocktails recovered elsewhere in the school, delivered to them by General Valerio Donnini that afternoon. Police also planted construction tools, hammers and knives from a nearby construction site and claimed they belonged to anarchist groups housed in the building. A police officer, Massimo Nucera, showed a slash in his bulletproof vest, claiming he was knifed by a violent demonstrator. However, the knife was never identified. He was later convicted of forgery and defamation, and it was later revealed that he cut his own vest to claim resistors were violent, and thus justify the brutality of the raid.

=== Beginning of the raid ===
The raid started a few minutes before midnight, when policemen massed outside the school. A police officer attacked British journalist Mark Covell, who tried to tell them he was a journalist. Within seconds, more policemen joined in the attack, beating him with nightsticks to the ground. According to Covell, one policeman kicked him in the chest, breaking half-a-dozen ribs whose splintered ends then shredded the membrane of his left lung, and laughed. Other policemen kicked him around, breaking his hand and damaging his spine. The police then used an armoured police van to break through the school gates and 150 policemen, wearing crash helmets and carrying truncheons and shields, entered the school compound.

=== Nature of police action during the raid ===
Blood on the walls of the school after the raid. (Indymedia)

For the raid, police wore masks to hinder identification. Most occupants of the building were in their sleeping bags, and many raised their arms in surrender when they realised the police were breaking into the building. However, police attacked the crowds with truncheons, beating everyone indiscriminately. A 65-year-old woman's arm was broken. Melanie Jonasch, a 28-year-old archaeology student from Berlin, was attacked by officers set upon her, beating her head so hard that she rapidly lost consciousness. When she fell to the ground, officers circled her, beating and kicking her limp body, banging her head against a nearby cupboard, leaving her in a pool of blood.

All occupants of the ground floor were seriously injured. In the first-floor corridor, some occupants decided to lie down on the ground to show that they offered no resistance. Nonetheless, police beat them and kicked them when they arrived. Soon, there were police officers on all four floors of the building, kicking and battering prone occupants. In one corridor, police ordered a group of young men and women to kneel, so that they could batter them around the head and shoulders more easily. Here, Daniel Albrecht, a 21-year-old cello student from Berlin, had his head beaten so badly that he needed surgery to stop bleeding in his brain. The police also used humiliation to cow the occupants of the school. An officer who stood spread-legged in front of a kneeling and injured woman, grabbed his groin and thrust it into her face. Another who paused amid the beatings and took a knife to cut off hair from his victims, including Nicola Doherty; the constant shouting of insults; the officer who asked a group if they were OK and who reacted to the one who said "No" by handing out an extra beating.

A few escaped, at least for a while. Karl Boro made it up on to the roof but then made the mistake of coming back into the building, where he was treated to heavy bruising to his arms and legs, a fractured skull, and bleeding in his chest cavity. Jaroslaw Engel, from Poland, managed to use builders' scaffolding to get out of the school, but he was caught in the street by some police drivers who smashed him over the head, laid him on the ground and stood over him smoking while his blood ran out across the tarmac.

Police officers found a fire extinguisher and squirted its foam into the wounds of an injured occupant. Other occupants were thrown down the stairs head-first. Eventually, they dragged all occupants into the ground-floor hall, where they had gathered dozens of prisoners from all over the building in a mess of blood and excrement. They threw her on top of two other people. They were not moving, and Lena Zuhlke drowsily asked them if they were alive. They did not reply, and she lay there on her back, unable to move her right arm, unable to stop her left arm and her legs twitching, blood seeping out of her head wounds. A group of police officers walked by, and each one lifted the bandana which concealed his identity, leaned down and spat on her face. Many victims of the raid were taken to the San Martino hospital, where police officers walked up and down the corridors, slapping their clubs into the palms of their hands, ordering the injured not to move around or look out of the window, keeping handcuffs on many of them and then, often with injuries still untended, shipping them across the city to join scores of others, from the Diaz school and from the street demonstrations, detained at the detention centre in the city's Bolzaneto district.

=== Treatment of prisoners at Bolzaneto ===
Prisoners at the temporary detention facility in Bolzaneto were forced to say "Viva il Duce" ("Long live the Duce", i.e. Benito Mussolini). and sing fascist songs: "Un, due, tre. Viva Pinochet!" The 222 people who were held at Bolzaneto were treated to a regime later described by public prosecutors as torture. On arrival, they were marked with felt-tip crosses on each cheek, and many were forced to walk between two parallel lines of officers who kicked and beat them. Most were herded into large cells, holding up to 30 people. Here, they were forced to stand for long periods, facing the wall with their hands up high and their legs spread. Those who failed to hold the position were shouted at, slapped and beaten. A prisoner with an artificial leg and, unable to hold the stress position, collapsed and was rewarded with two bursts of pepper spray in his face and, later, a particularly savage beating.

Prisoners who answered back were met with violence. One of them, Stefan Bauer, answered a question from a German-speaking guard and said he was from the European Union and he had the right to go where he wanted. He was hauled out, beaten, sprayed with pepper spray, stripped naked and put under a cold shower. His clothes were taken away and he was returned to the freezing cell wearing only a flimsy hospital gown.

The detainees were given few or no blankets, kept awake by guards, given little or no food and denied their statutory right to make phone calls and see a lawyer. They could hear crying and screaming from other cells. Police doctors at the facility also participated in the torture, using ritual humiliation, threats of rape and deprivation of water, food, sleep and medical care. A prisoner named Richard Moth was given stitches in his head and legs without anaesthetics, which made the procedure painful.

Men and women with dreadlocks had their hair roughly cut off to the scalp. One detainee, Marco Bistacchia was taken to an office, stripped naked, made to get down on all fours and told to bark like a dog and to shout "Viva la polizia Italiana!" He was sobbing too much to obey. An unnamed officer told the Italian newspaper La Repubblica that he had seen police officers urinating on prisoners and beating them for refusing to sing "Faccetta nera", a Mussolini-era fascist song.

Ester Percivati, a young Turkish woman, recalled guards calling her a whore as she was marched to the toilet, where a woman officer forced her head down into the bowl and a male jeered "Nice arse! Would you like a truncheon up it?" Several women reported threats of rape. Finally, the police forced their captives to sign statements, waiving all their legal rights. One man, David Larroquelle, testified that he refused to sign the statements. Police broke three of his ribs for his disobedience.

== Media and government reactions ==
The British journalist Covell was photographed with his wounds immediately after the raid by Daily Mail journalist Lucie Morris, who bribed Italian police to approach him. Soon afterward, the Daily Mail wrote a story accusing Covell of helping mastermind the riots. Covell contended the story was false, but was in no financial position to sue for libel. However, he was able to get legal aid to sue for invasion of privacy. Covell argued that under the Convention on Human Rights and the Italian constitution, he had a reasonable expectation of privacy in his hospital room, and Morris breached it by entering his room under false pretense. The Mail initially stood by its reporting. However, when it became apparent that the paper stood no chance in court, it agreed to pay damages to Covell and reimburse him for his legal expenses. Managing editor Charles Garside also wrote a private letter of apology to Covell.

While his citizens were being beaten and tormented in illegal detention, spokesmen for the then prime minister, Tony Blair, declared: "The Italian police had a difficult job to do. The prime minister believes that they did that job." Blair's refusal to criticise police violence was condemned by British protesters on their expulsion from Italy.

While the bloody bodies were being carried out of the Diaz Pertini building on stretchers, police told reporters that the ambulances lined up in the street were nothing to do with the raid. They also claimed that the school building was being used as a makeshift hospital by anarchists who had attacked policemen, and many of the injured in the building had pre-existing injuries.

The next day, senior officers held a press conference at which they announced that everybody in the building would be charged with aggressive resistance to arrest and conspiracy to cause destruction. Later, Italian courts dismissed all charges against everyone.

At the same press conference, police displayed an array of what they described as weaponry. This included crowbars, hammers and nails which they themselves had taken from a builder's store next to the school; aluminium rucksack frames, which they presented as offensive weapons; 17 cameras; 13 pairs of swimming goggles; 10 pen-knives; and a bottle of sun-tan lotion. They also displayed two Molotov cocktails which had been found by police earlier in the day in another part of the city and planted in the Diaz Pertini building as the raid ended.

At the Edinburgh International Television Festival 2001, alternative news journalist Paul O'Connor from Undercurrents news called the mainstream reporting of Genoa "lazy journalism". CNN president Chris Cramer replied that the independent journalism coming out of the protests was "an antidote to that laziness".

== Attack on the Indymedia building ==
On the night of the raid, a force of 59 police entered the building opposite the Diaz Pertini, where Covell and others had been running their Indymedia centre and where, crucially, a group of lawyers had been based, gathering evidence about police attacks on the earlier demonstrations. Officers went into the lawyers' room, threatened the occupants, smashed their computers and seized hard drives. They also removed anything containing photographs or video tape.

== Investigations and judicial action ==
Fifteen Italian police officers and doctors were sentenced to jail for brutally mistreating detainees at the Bolzaneto holding camp. However, none of them actually served prison terms because the convictions and sentences were wiped out by a statute of limitations. Those found guilty, including the camp commander, Biagio Gugliotta, were given jail sentences ranging from five months to five years. However, none served any portion of their sentence. While the verdict did not lead to the punishment of the offenders, it did help victims claim compensation. Since torture is not present in Italy’s code, officers alleged to have tortured demonstrators have never been charged with torture.

On September 21, 2012, the Italian interior ministry awarded Mark Cowell €350,000 (£280,000 or US$454,265) in an out-of-court settlement. Cowell had suffered broken ribs, smashed teeth and a shredded lung in the attack, and had spent the better part of a decade traveling between the UK and Italy to pursue his case. In return, he dropped his Court of Human Rights case against the Italian government.

On April 7, 2015, the European Court of Human Rights condemned Italy for the violation of Article 3 of the European Convention on Human Rights in the Cestaro v. Italy trial and found the Italian legislation against torture to be inadequate.

The European Court of Human Rights on 22 June 2017 ruled that the Italian police involved in the raid and subsequent detention were guilty of torture, denouncing what it called a "particularly serious and cruel" police raid. The state of Italy was ordered to pay damages to the victims in the order of €45,000–55,000 EUR each.

== See also ==
- Diaz – Don't Clean Up This Blood
