= TorinoFilmLab =

Italian film-related workshop

TorinoFilmLab (TFL) is a Turin-based laboratory that primarily supports persons working on their first and second fiction feature films. Its four main fields of involvement are training, development, funding and distribution.

TorinoFilmLab runs several projects in each of these fields every year. They end at the TFL Meeting Event in November during the Torino Film Festival, when participants of the different programmes present their work to a selected group of producers, sales agents, distributors and other professionals in independent filmmaking.

== History ==
This lab was created in 2008 with the aim of complementing Torino Film Festival with a laboratory dedicated to emerging filmmakers.

TFL offers various residential workshops and on-line sessions to its participants. The programmes run parallel during the year and reach their conclusion in November at the TFL Meeting Event during the Torino Film Festival. At this occasion, TFL also hand over various awards in order to financially support the production and distribution of the selected films.

TFL is financed by Ministero dei beni e delle attività culturali, Regione Piemonte and Città di Torino, and is promoted by the main film institutions established in Turin and Piedmont – Museo Nazionale del Cinema and Film Commission Torino Piemonte. It is also partially funded by the European Union programme Creative Europe and by partners from several countries. In 2015, about 57% of the funding came from outside Italy.

== Courses ==
TFL offers courses in various areas in filmmaking, with a particular emphasis on scriptwriting (both original and adaptation, as well as story editing), pre-production and distribution. About 40 projects are selected each year.

== List of supported projects ==
Since its inception in 2008 more than 50 films have had TFL support. Seven films supported by TFL were selected at Cannes Film Festival 2016, and 5 of them received major awards.

=== FeatureLab ===
Release year	Film	Director	Production countrie(s)	World premiere	Ref.
2010	Agua fría de mar	Paz Fábrega	Costa Rica, France, Spain, Netherlands, Mexico	VPRO Tiger Awards Competition, International Film Festival Rotterdam	
2010	Hi-So	Aditya Assarat	Thailand	A Window on Asian Cinema, 15th Busan International Film Festival	
2010	Le quattro volte	Michelangelo Frammartino	Italy, Germany, Switzerland	Directors' Fortnight, 2010 Cannes Film Festival	
2011	Seven Acts of Mercy	Massimiliano de Serio, Gianluca de Serio	Italy, Romania	International Competition, 64th Locarno Film Festival	
2011	The Slut	Hagar Ben-Asher		Critics' Week, 2011 Cannes Film Festival	
2011	Swans	Hugo Vieira da Silva	Germany, Portugal	Forum, 61st Berlin International Film Festival	
2012	Children of Sarajevo	Aida Begić	Bosnia and Herzegovina, Germany, France, Turkey	Un Certain Regard, 2012 Cannes Film Festival	
2012	Feed Me with Your Words	Martin Turk	Slovenia	Competition, Festival of Slovenian Film	
2012	I'm Going to Change My Name	Mariya Saakyan	Armenia, Russia, Germany, Denmark	Experimenta, BFI London Film Festival	
2012	Lions	Jazmin Lopez	Argentina, France, Netherlands	Orizzonti, 69th Venice International Film Festival	
2012	Postcards from the Zoo	Edwin	Indonesia, Hong Kong, Germany	Competition, 62nd Berlin International Film Festival	
2012	Wadjda	Haifaa al-Mansour	Saudi Arabia, Germany, United States, United Arab Emirates, Jordan, Netherlands	Orizzonti, 69th Venice International Film Festival	
2013	The Lunchbox	Ritesh Batra	India, France, Germany	Critics' Week, 2013 Cannes Film Festival	
2013	South Is Nothing	Fabio Mollo	Italy, France	Discovery, 2013 Toronto International Film Festival	
2014	Bypass	Duane Hopkins	United Kingdom	Orizzonti, 71st Venice International Film Festival	
2014	Los Hongos	Oscar Ruiz Navia	Colombia, France, Argentina, Germany	Filmmakers of the Present, 67th Locarno Film Festival	
2014	Men Who Save the World	Liew Seng Tat	Malaysia, Netherlands, Germany, France	Filmmakers of the Present, 67th Locarno Film Festival	
2015	Eva Doesn't Sleep	Pablo Agüero	Argentina, Spain, France	Wavelength, 2015 Toronto International Film Festival	
2015	Eva Nová	Marko Škop	Slovakia, Czech Republic	Discovery, 2015 Toronto International Film Festival	
2015	Family Film	Olmo Omerzu	Czech Republic, France, Germany, Slovakia, Slovenia	New Directors, San Sebastián International Film Festival	
2015	The Garbage Helicopter	Jonas Selberg Augustsén	Sweden, Qatar	Laugh, BFI London Film Festival	
2015	Interruption	Yorgos Zois	Greece, France, Croatia	Orizzonti, 72nd Venice International Film Festival	
2015	Underground Fragrance	Pengfei	France, China	Venice Days, 72nd Venice International Film Festival	
2016	Diamond Island	Davy Chou	Cambodia, France, Germany	Critics' Week, 2016 Cannes Film Festival	
2016	The Last Land	Pablo Lamar	Chile, Netherlands, Paraguay	Bright Future, International Film Festival Rotterdam	
2016	Raw	Julia Ducournau	France, Belgium	Critics' Week, 2016 Cannes Film Festival	
2017	Pop Aye	Kirsten Tan	Singapore, Thailand	World Cinema Dramatic Competition, 2017 Sundance Film Festival	
2017	The Wound	John Trengove	South Africa, Germany, Netherlands, France	World Cinema Dramatic Competition, 2017 Sundance Film Festival	
2018	Diamantino	Gabriel Abrantes, Daniel Schmidt	Portugal, France, Brazil	Critics' Week, 2018 Cannes Film Festival	
2018	The Guest	Duccio Chiarini	Italy, Switzerland, France	Piazza Grande, 71st Locarno Film Festival	
2018	Land	Babak Jalali	Italy, France, Netherlands, Mexico, Qatar	Panorama, 68th Berlin International Film Festival	
2018	The Night Eats the World	Dominique Rocher	France	Competition, Angers European First Film Festival	
2019	Abou Leila	Amin Sidi-Boumédiène	Algeria, France, Qatar	Critics' Week, 2019 Cannes Film Festival	
2019	Alelí	Leticia Jorge Romero	Uruguay, Argentina	Competition, Biarritz Film Festival	
2019	Litigante	Franco Lolli	Colombia, France	Critics' Week, 2019 Cannes Film Festival	
2019	The Orphanage	Shahrbanoo Sadat	Denmark, Afghanistan, France	Directors' Fortnight, 2019 Cannes Film Festival	
2019	Pelican Blood	Katrin Gebbe	Germany, Bulgaria	Orizzonti, 76th Venice International Film Festival	
2019	Port Authority	Danielle Lessovitz	France, United States	Un Certain Regard, 2019 Cannes Film Festival	
2019	Sole	Carlo Sironi	Italy, Poland	Orizzonti, 76th Venice International Film Festival	
2020	Sow the Wind	Danilo Caputo	France, Greece, Italy	Panorama, 70th Berlin International Film Festival	
2020	Wildland	Jeanette Nordahl	Denmark	Panorama, 70th Berlin International Film Festival	
2020	Yalda, a Night for Forgiveness	Massoud Bakhshi	Iran, France, Germany, Switzerland, Luxembourg, Lebanon	World Cinema Dramatic Competition, 2020 Sundance Film Festival	
2021	Costa Brava, Lebanon	Mounia Akl	Lebanon, France, Qatar, Spain, Sweden	Orizzonti Extra, 78th Venice International Film Festival	
2021	Feathers	Omar El Zohairy	France, Egypt, Netherlands, Greece	Critics' Week, 2021 Cannes Film Festival	
2021	Natural Light	Dénes Nagy	Hungary, France, Latvia, Germany	Competition, 71st Berlin International Film Festival	
2021	Out of Sync	Juanjo Giménez	Spain, France, Lithuania	Giornate degli Autori, 78th Venice International Film Festival	
2021	Pilgrims	Laurynas Bareiša	Lithuania	Orizzonti, 78th Venice International Film Festival	
2021	Small Body	Laura Samani	Italy, Slovenia, France	Critics' Week, 2021 Cannes Film Festival	
2021	Taste	Lê Bảo	Vietnam, Thailand, Singapore, France, Germany	Encounters, 71st Berlin International Film Festival	
2021	Whether the Weather Is Fine	Carlo Francisco Manatad	Philippines, France, Singapore, Indonesia, Germany, Qatar	Filmmakers of the Present, 74th Locarno Film Festival	
2021	Yuni	Kamila Andini	Indonesia, Singapore, France, Australia	Platform, 2021 Toronto International Film Festival	
2022	A Male	Fabian Hernández	Colombia, France, Germany, Netherlands	Directors' Fortnight, 2022 Cannes Film Festival	
2022	Autobiography	Makbul Mubarak	Indonesia, France, Singapore, Poland, Philippines, Germany, Qatar	Orizzonti, 79th Venice International Film Festival	
2022	Runner	Marian Mathias	United States, France, Germany	Discovery, 2022 Toronto International Film Festival	
2022	Unrest	Cyril Schäublin	Switzerland	Encounters, 72nd Berlin International Film Festival	
2022	The Woodcutter Story	Mikko Myllylahti	Finland, Denmark, Netherlands, Germany	Critics' Week, 2022 Cannes Film Festival	
2023	Alien Food	Giorgio Cugno	Italy, Denmark	Harbour, International Film Festival Rotterdam	
2023	City of Wind	Lkhagvadulam Purev-Ochir	France, Mongolia, Portugal, Netherlands, Qatar	Orizzonti, 80th Venice International Film Festival	
2023	Day of the Tiger	Andrei Tănase	Romania, France, Greece	Bright Future, International Film Festival Rotterdam	
2023	Family Time	Tia Kouvo	Finland, Sweden	Encounters, 73rd Berlin International Film Festival	
2023	Heartless	Nara Normande, Tião	Brazil, France, Italy	Orizzonti, 80th Venice International Film Festival	
2023	Last Shadow at First Light	Nicole Midori Woodford	Singapore, Japan, Slovenia, Philippines, Indonesia	New Directors, 71st San Sebastián International Film Festival	
2023	The Settlers	Felipe Gálvez	Chile, Argentina, France, Denmark, United Kingdom, Taiwan, Sweden, Germany	Un Certain Regard, 2023 Cannes Film Festival	
2024	Crocodile Tears	Tumpal Tampubolon	Indonesia, France, Germany, Singapore	Centrepiece, 2024 Toronto International Film Festival	
2024	Nina	Andrea Jaurrieta	Spain	Competition, 27th Málaga Film Festival	
2024	Panopticon	George Sikharulidze	Georgia, France, Italy, Romania	Crystal Globe Competition, 58th Karlovy Vary International Film Festival	
2024	Shambhala	Min Bahadur Bham	Nepal, France, Norway, Hong Kong, China, Turkey, United States, Qatar, Taiwan	Main Competition, 74th Berlin International Film Festival	
2024	Still Here	Suranga Katugampala	France, Italy, Sri Lanka	Panorama Italia, 19th Rome Film Festival	
2024	Tale of the Land	Loeloe Hendra	Indonesia, Philippines, Taiwan, Qatar	New Currents, 29th Busan International Film Festival	
2024	Weightless	Sara Fgaier	Italy	Main Competition, 77th Locarno Film Festival	
2025	Caravan	Zuzana Kirchnerová	Czech Republic, Slovakia, Italy	Un Certain Regard, 2025 Cannes Film Festival	
2025	Cuerpo Celeste	Nayra Ilic García	Chile, Italy	International Narrative Competition, Tribeca Festival	
2025	Elsewhere at Night	Marianne Métivier	Canada, Philippines	National Competition, 2025 Festival du nouveau cinéma	
2025	Little Trouble Girls	Urška Djukić	Slovenia, Italy, Croatia, Serbia	Perspectives, 75th Berlin International Film Festival	
2025	Milk Teeth	Mihai Mincan	Romania, France, Denmark, Greece, Bulgaria	Orizzonti, 82nd Venice International Film Festival	
2025	The Mysterious Gaze of the Flamingo	Diego Céspedes	Chile, France, Belgium, Spain, Germany	Un Certain Regard, 2025 Cannes Film Festival	
2025	Renoir	Chie Hayakawa	Japan, France, Singapore, Philippines, Indonesia	Competition, 2025 Cannes Film Festival	
2025	The Things You Kill	Alireza Khatami	France, Poland, Canada, Turkey	World Cinema Dramatic Competition, 2025 Sundance Film Festival	
2025	The Visitor	Vytautas Katkus	Lithuania, Norway, Sweden	Crystal Globe Competition, 59th Karlovy Vary International Film Festival	
2025	White Snail	Elsa Kremser and Levin Peter	Germany, Austria	Main Competition, 78th Locarno Film Festival	
2025	Wondrous Is the Silence of My Master	Ivan Salatić	Montenegro, Italy, France, Croatia, Serbia	Tiger Competition, 54th International Film Festival Rotterdam	
2026	A Day in the Life of Jo: Chapter Phaedra	Jacqueline Lentzou	Greece, Germany, France	Orizzonti, 83rd Venice International Film Festival	
2026	The Meltdown	Manuela Martelli	Chile, United States, Spain, Mexico	Un Certain Regard, 2026 Cannes Film Festival	
2026	Titanic Ocean	Konstantina Kotzamani	Greece, Germany, Romania, France, Spain, Japan	Un Certain Regard, 2026 Cannes Film Festival	

== Alumni ==
From 2008 to 2015, TFL has trained 480 participants from 70 countries.

=== Notable alumni ===
- Jonas Carpignano
- Aida Begić
- Álvaro Brechner
- Antonio Piazza
- Fabio Grassadonia
- György Pálfi
- Haifaa al-Mansour
- Jan-Ole Gerster
- Juho Kuosmanen
- Julia Ducournau
- László Nemes
- Michelangelo Frammartino
- Oliver Laxe
- Ritesh Batra
