= Genoa Social Forum =

The Genoa Social Forum is a coalition of movements, political parties and societies opposed to capitalist globalisation. It was created in 2000, a year before the scheduled 27th G8 summit in Genoa in 2001, and included several associations - and hundreds of smaller ones - largely but not solely from Italy. Although it made several requests to meet the institutional representatives, as a forerunner of a counter-forum, on June 24, 2001 they were met by police chief Gianni De Gennaro. Its national spokesperson was Vittorio Agnoletto, former MEP for the Communist Refoundation Party.

== History ==
The GSF was established in Genoa in 2000 as a "Working Pact" in preparation for the G8 summit in the Ligurian capital, where the infamous events of the Genoa G8 would later take place. It adopted the definitive name of the Genoa Social Forum on the 27 February 2001 and was joined by 11187 organisations, including associations, parties, social centres, trade unions, and NGOs from Italy and abroad.

Despite numerous requests for meetings with representatives of institutions in preparation for the organisation of a counter-forum, officials only agreed to meet on the 24 June 2001 with the Chief of Police Gianni de Gennaro.

== National adherents to the GSF ==
- ACM - Associazione Culturale Mignanego
- Altrimondi
- ARCI Associazione Libriamo
- ARCI Circolo Mascherona 16
- ARCI Genova
- Arciragazzi
- Associazione Agire Politicamente
- Associazione Città Aperta
- Associazione Comunità Papa Giovanni XXIII Liguria
- Associazione Gay-Lesbica Liberi Tutti
- Associazione Giuristi Democratici
- Associazione Medici per l'Ambiente - ISDE
- Associazione per il Rinnovamento della Sinistra
- Associazione Pimpiripetta
- AYUSYA
- Bambini Vittime
- Banca Etica - Circoscrizione Locale di Genova e Imperia
- CEDRITT
- Centro Cooperazione Sviluppo
- Chiesa Evangelica Metodista
- Chiesa Evangelica Valdese di Sampierdarena
- COGEDE
- Comunità di San Benedetto al Porto
- Consorzio Sociale Agorà
- COSPE
- Centro Sociale Talpa e Orologio
- CSOA Emiliano Zapata
- CSOA Terra di Nessuno
- Federazione Chiese Evangeliche Liguria
- Federazione dei Giovani Socialisti
- Federazione Giovanile Comunisti Italiani
- Federazione Regionale Solidarietà e Lavoro
- Federazione Impiegati Operai Metallurgici - Fiom
- Giovani Comunisti
- ICS - Consorzio Italiano di Solidarietà
- Il Ce.sto
- ISCOS CISL Liguria
- La Rete per il Partito Democratico Liguria
- Lavoratori della Libreria Feltrinelli
- Lavoro Società - Cambiare Rotta - CGIL
- Legacoop Liguria - Comparto Cooperative Sociali
- Legambiente Circolo Nuova Ecologia
- Legambiente Regionale Liguria
- LILA
- LOC - Lega degli obiettori di coscienza
- Macondo
- Mani Tese
- Marea
- MLAL - Movimento Laici America Latina
- Movimento Federalista Europeo
- Partito della Rifondazione Comunista
- Partito della Rifondazione Comunista - Forum Donne
- Partito Umanista
- Planet
- Progetto Continenti
- RdB - Rappresentanze di Base as an adherent of the CUB
- RdB - Rappresentanze di Base as an adherent of the CUB delegati INPS
- Rete ControG8
- Rete Lilliput
- Rappresentati Sindacali Unitari
- Sinistra Giovanile
- Sondagenova
- Suore del Buon Pastore
- Time for Peace - Gruppo di Solidarietà Camogli
- UISP
- Ya Basta!
