= Thony =

Italian singer and actress (born 1982)

- Born: Federica Victoria Caiozzo; 17 May 1982 (age 44); Palermo, Italy
- Origin: Italy
- Genres: Acoustic, Indie folk, Indie rock
- Occupations: Singer; actress
- Instrument: Guitar
- Years active: 2004–present
- Website: www.rockit.it/thony

Federica Victoria Johanna Caiozzo (born 15 May 1982), known professionally as Thony, is an Italian singer and actress.

== Biography ==
Thony was born in Sicily by an Italian father and a Polish mother. When she was a teenager, she read a book about the history of Quebec. She was particularity inspired by politician Thony Ciallella and his revolutionary views. She eventually adopted his first name as her stage name later in her career. She moved to Rome in 2002 to study singing and music; after a few years of solo live performances, she started in 2009 a collaboration with the band Jobi 4, resulting in the publication of an EP and an LP.

After these experiences she decided to focus on the solo album, With the Green in My Mouth, produced in 2010 with Stefano Mariani (sound editor) and published on the web only in 2011. Thanks to this record, the Italian movie director Paolo Virzì contacted her to work on the soundtrack of his movie upcoming film Every Blessed Day (Italian: Tutti i santi giorni, 2012). During the beginning of the filming, Virzì decided to offer her also the leading female role, together with Luca Marinelli. She was nominated in 2013 for David di Donatello for Best Actress (Italian: David di Donatello per la migliore attrice protagonista). She published in 2012 the album Birds with the collaborations of Leonardo Milani, Zsuzsanna Krazsnai, and Andrea Ruggiero, and produced by herself. The song Flowers Blossom is awarded with the Ciak d'oro in June 2013 for best original song.

In 2016 she was announced to be part of a new band called "Malihini" and signed with the London label Memphis Industries

She has the main female role in Daniele Luchetti's Momenti di trascurabile felicità.

== Discography ==
- 2011 - With the Green in My Mouth (Unreleased)
- 2012 - Tutti i santi giorni (soundtrack)
- 2012 - Birds (GDM/Sony Publishing)
- 2019 - Hopefully, again (Memphis Industries) *with Malihini*

== Filmography ==
=== Films ===
Year	Title	Role	Notes
2012	Every Blessed Day	Antonia Cusumano	
2015	I Killed Napoléon	Enrica	
2018	The Guest	Roberta	
2019	La notte è piccola per noi	Naomi	Cameo appearance
2019	Ordinary Happiness	Agata	
2021	With or Without You	Antonia	
2022	September	Debora	
2022	The Girl from Tomorrow	Ines Faranda	

=== Television ===
Year	Title	Role	Notes
2015–2018	Tutto può succedere	Herself (fictional version)	Recurring role (seasons 1–3)
2020–2022	Summertime	Isabella	Main role

== Awards ==
- 2019
  - Nomination Nastro d'Argento - Best Actress for Ordinary Happiness
- 2013
  - Ciak d'oro - Best Original Song for "Flowers Blossom"
  - Nomination David di Donatello - Best actress for Every Blessed Day
  - Nomination Nastro d'argento - Best Actress for Every Blessed Day
  - Nomination Globo d'oro - Best Actress for Every Blessed Day
  - Prix d'interprétacion féminine (Best leading female role) Festival du cinema italien di Bastia
  - Festival del Cinema di Spello - Best Soundtrack for Every Blessed Day
- 2012
  - FICE (Federazione Italiana Cinema D'Essai) - Best Seginner Actress
