= Young Communists (Italy) =

Youth wing of the Italian Communist Refoundation Party

Young Communists Giovani Comunisti/e
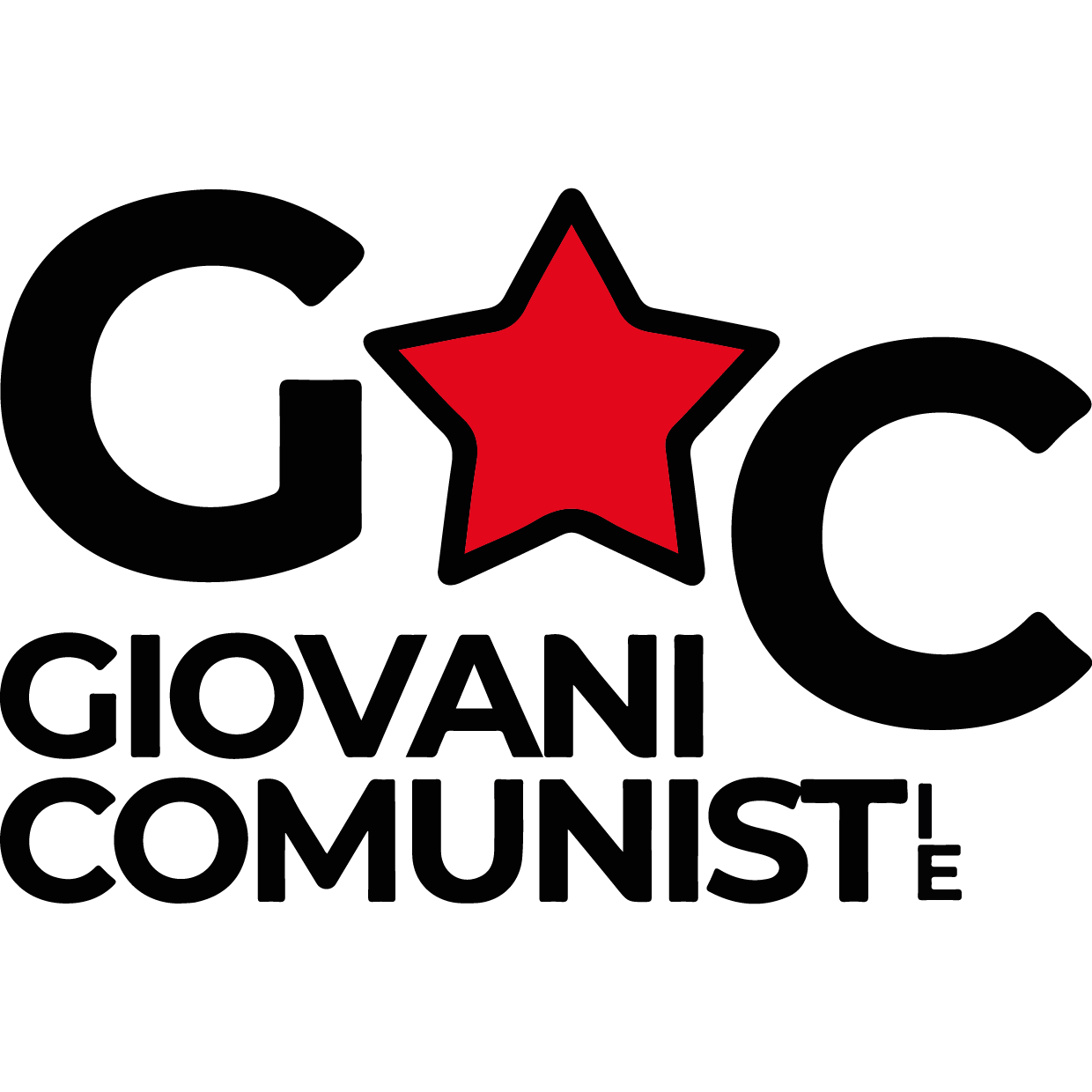
- Logo of the Young Communists

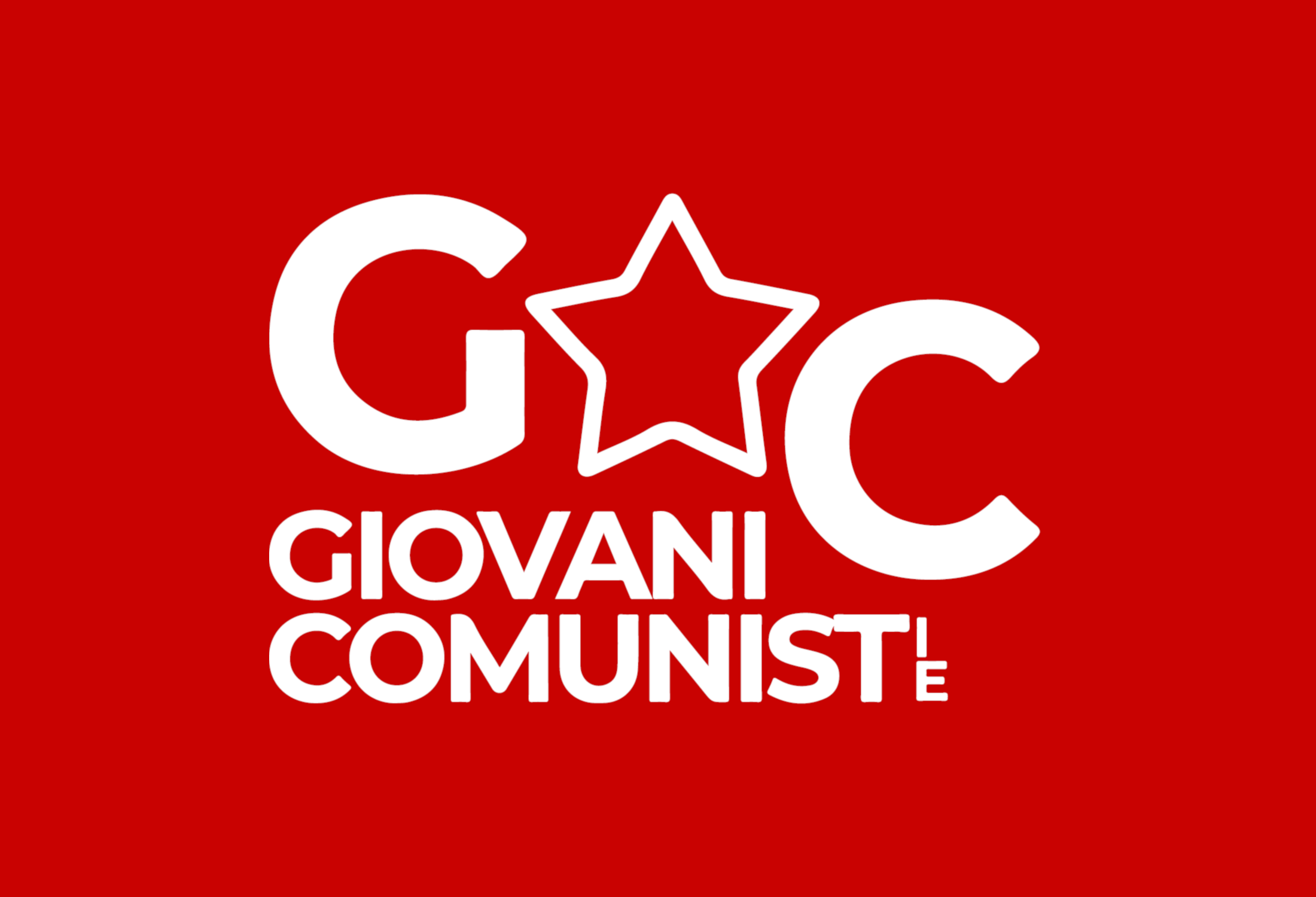
- Flag of the Young Communists
- Chairperson: Edoardo Casati
- Founded: 1995
- Headquarters: Piazzale degli Eroi, 9, Rome
- Membership: 1.107 (2025)
- Ideology: Communism; Anti-imperialism; Anti-fascism
- Mother party: Communist Refoundation Party
- International affiliation: World Federation of Democratic Youth
- Website: Official website

The Young Communists (Italian: Giovani Comunisti/e) is the youth wing of the Italian Communist Refoundation Party.

Although the party was founded in 1991 (following the dissolution of the Italian Communist Party, and its youth section, the FGCI), the young members of the party did not have a stable organization until the middle of 1994, when Marco Rizzo created the Giovani Comunisti.

The first National Assembly took place in Chianciano in February 1996. In December 1997 the first National Convention of the GC took place. On this occasion two documents were presented. The party majority won with its own document gaining 67.8% of the vote. From the 4th to 7 July 2002 the second National Convention took place in Marina di Massa.

Since its formation in 1994, the Giovani Comunisti (GC) has become a notable part of the Italian left-wing movement. Following the G8 summit in Genoa, the organization has gained prominence in Italian youth politics.

The Giovani Comunisti on a worldwide platform are affiliated to the World Federation of Democratic Youth.

During the VII National Conference, held the 15th and 16th of July 2023, Paolo Bertolozzi was elected as chairperson.

== National Committee ==
| Name | Role |
|---|---|
| Paolo Bertolozzi | Chairperson |
| Vittorio Savini | Organization officer |
| Antonio Marzio Liuzzi | Communication officer |
| Samuele Soddu | Foreign affairs officer |
| Auro Bizzoni | Work officer |
| Edoardo Casati | School and university officer |
| Alessio Capogreco and Andrea Russo | Anti-Mafia deputies |
| Eleonora Galli | Gender policies officer |
| Giulio Cecchi | Culture and formation officer |
| Gianmarco Mereu | National self-determination and autonomous Regions deputy |
| Ilaria Falossi | LGBTQIA+ officer |
| Ivan Lamonarca | Environment officer |
| Marco Canciani | Antifascist deputy |
| Filippo Barsi and Dalia Palmerini | Newspaper committee |

== Symbols ==
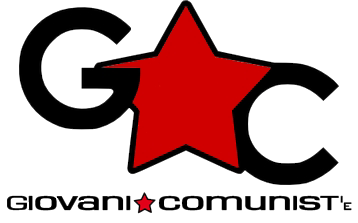
Symbol used from 2010 to 2020

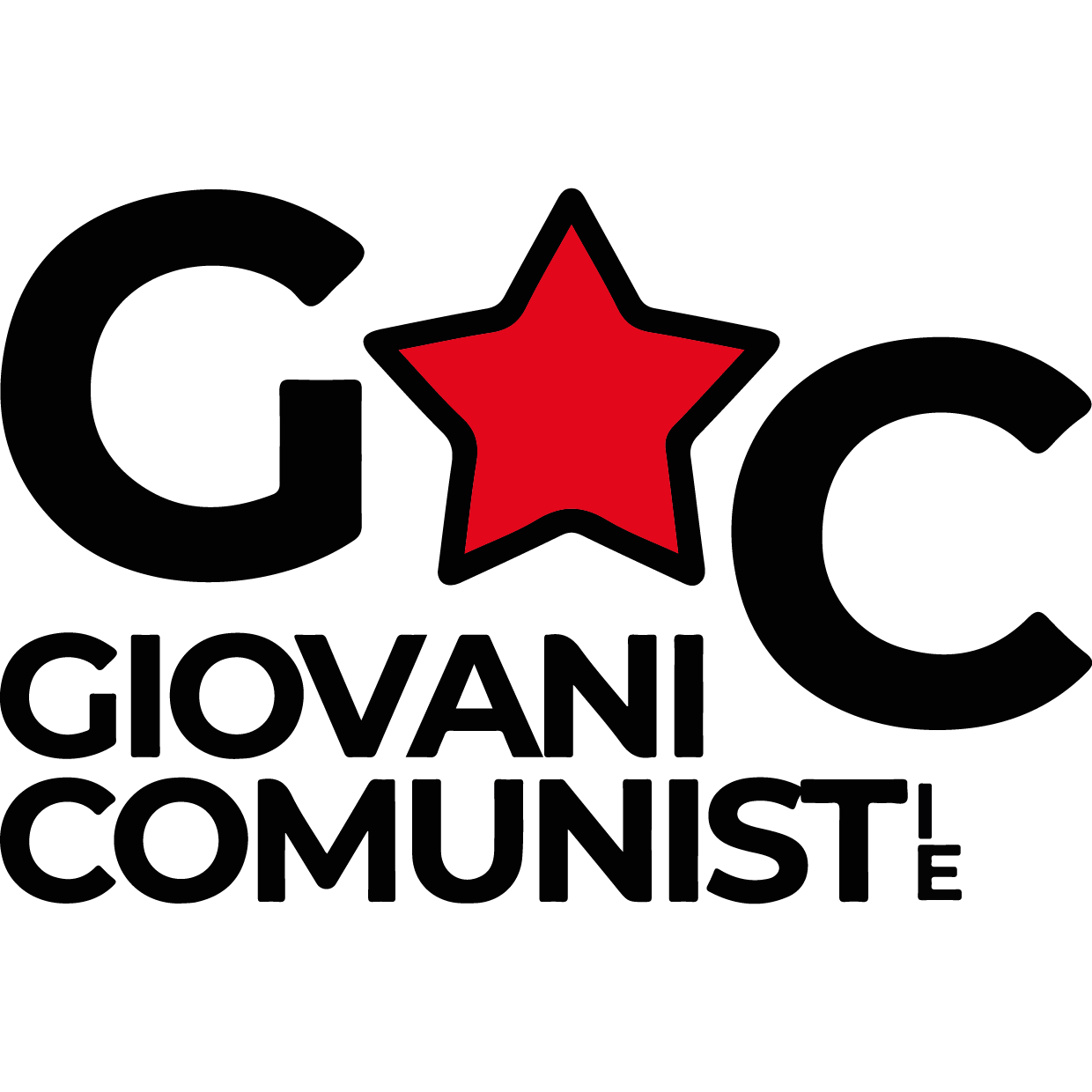
Symbol in use from 2020 to present

== See also ==
- Youth Federation of Italian Communists
- Italian Communist Youth Federation
