= Born for You (film) =

2023 Italian drama film

- Italian: Nata per te
- Directed by: Fabio Mollo
- Screenplay by: Giulia Calenda; Furio Andreotti; Fabio Mollo
- Based on: Nata per te by Luca Trapanese and Luca Mercadante
- Starring: Pierluigi Gigante; Teresa Saponangelo; Barbora Bobuľová; Alessandro Piavani; Antonia Truppo; Iaia Forte
- Cinematography: Claudio Cofrancesco
- Edited by: Filippo Montemurro
- Music by: Giorgio Giampà
- Production companies: Cattleya; Bartlebyfilm
- Distributed by: Vision Distribution
- Release dates: 27 September 2023 (Naples); 5 October 2023 (Italy)
- Running time: 113 minutes
- Country: Italy
- Language: Italian

Born for You (Italian: Nata per te) is a 2023 Italian biographical drama film directed by Fabio Mollo. It is an adaptation of the 2018 book of the same name by Luca Trapanese and Luca Mercadante, based on the story of Trapanese's adoption of Alba, a child with Down syndrome.

The film premiered at the 24th edition of the Napoli Film Festival on 27 September 2023. It was released theatrically in Italy on 5 October 2023.

== Plot ==
A baby girl with Down syndrome is abandoned at an Italian hospital, where a nurse names her Alba Stellamia. Luca Trapanese, a gay man who volunteers with an organisation supporting people with disabilities, hopes to become a father alongside his partner, Lorenzo. However, his attempts to adopt a child are hindered by Italian adoption law, which generally favours heterosexual couples.

When Luca learns about Alba, who has repeatedly been turned down by prospective adoptive parents, he becomes determined to raise her. His commitment to adopting Alba strains his relationship with Lorenzo, and the two eventually separate. Luca seeks the help of lawyer Teresa Ranieri, who suggests pursuing long-term foster care rather than adoption.

After another family rejects Alba, Luca is granted temporary custody of the baby for one month. Although the placement is successful, he becomes uncomfortable when media coverage turns his personal situation into a political controversy. Teresa encourages him to recognise the broader significance of his case and discusses the legal obstacles surrounding adoption by single men with judge Livia Gianfelici.

The judge eventually approves Luca's adoption of Alba. The girl becomes Alba Trapanese, and Luca's case marks a milestone in the recognition of adoption by a single gay man in Italy.

== Cast ==
- Pierluigi Gigante as Luca Trapanese
  - Silvio Minichello as young Luca Trapanese
- Teresa Saponangelo as Teresa Ranieri
- Barbora Bobuľová as Livia Gianfelici
- Alessandro Piavani as Lorenzo
- Giuseppe Pirozzi as Paolo
- Antonia Truppo as Nunzia
- Iaia Forte as Antonia
- Liliana Bottone as Claudia Di Marcello
- Loris De Luna as Marco
- Raffaele Ausiello as Armando
- Antonello Cossia as Giuseppe
- Francesca Pezzella as Mariella
- Lucio Provenza as Eugenio
- Viola Carbone, Pietro Ponti and Isabel Paolone as Alba
