= Milk Teeth (film) =

2025 film by Mihai Mincan

- Official poster
- Romanian: Dinți de lapte
- Directed by: Mihai Mincan
- Written by: Mihai Mincan
- Produced by: Radu Stancu; Ioana Lascăr
- Starring: Emma Ioana Mogos; Marina Palii; Igor Babiac; István Téglás
- Cinematography: George Chiper-Lillemark
- Edited by: Dragoș Apetri
- Music by: Marius Leftărache; Nicolas Becker
- Production company: de Film
- Release date: 28 August 2025 (Venice)
- Running time: 104 minutes
- Countries: Romania; France; Denmark; Greece; Bulgaria
- Language: Romanian

Milk Teeth (Romanian: Dinți de lapte) is a 2025 political fantasy drama film directed and written by Mihai Mincan. It stars Emma Ioana Mogos as Maria, a ten-year-old girl who witnesses her sister's mysterious disappearance during the final days of Nicolae Ceaușescu's dictatorship in 1989. It is a Romanian-French-Danish-Greek-Bulgarian international co-production.

The film had its world premiere at the 82nd Venice International Film Festival on 28 August 2025 at the Orizzonti section.

== Premise ==
Set in 1989, a ten-year-old girl becomes the last witness of her sister's disappearance during the final days of Nicolae Ceaușescu's dictatorship.

== Cast ==
- Emma Ioana Mogos as Maria
- Marina Palii
- Igor Babiac
- István Téglás
- Karina Ziana Gherasim

== Production ==
The story of the film is partly based on Mincan's own childhood experiences as he grew up during that time. In an interview with Variety, he also stated that his daughter's feelings of disconnection from the world inspired the narrative approach to the character of Maria. The project was first showcased at the 2020 Baltic Event Co-Production Market, held during the Tallinn Black Nights Film Festival. It participated at the 2023 TorinoFilmLab FeatureLab. It won the Production Award and Green Filming Awards, receiving a total of €44,000 production grants. In June 2025, it was presented at the Last Push section of the ECAM Forum in Madrid, Spain.

Principal photography took place in Bucharest, Lupeni, and Vulcan, Hunedoara, Romania in November 2024.

== Release ==
Milk Teeth had its world premiere at the Orizzonti section of the 82nd Venice International Film Festival on 28 August 2025. Prior to the premiere, it was reported that Cercamon had boarded the film's world sales. It will make its North American premiere at the Centrepiece section of the 2025 Toronto International Film Festival.
