= Don't Be Bad =

2015 Italian drama film

- Film poster
- Directed by: Claudio Caligari
- Written by: Caludio Caligari; Francesca Serafini; Giordano Meacci
- Story by: Claudio Caligari
- Starring: Luca Marinelli; Alessandro Borghi
- Cinematography: Maurizio Calvesi
- Release date: 8 September 2015
- Running time: 100 minutes
- Country: Italy
- Language: Italian

Don't Be Bad (Italian: Non essere cattivo) is a 2015 Italian drama film directed by Claudio Caligari. The film was selected as the Italian entry for the Best Foreign Language Film at the 88th Academy Awards but it was not nominated. It was the last film directed by Caligari: a few days after the end of the film editing, he died from a tumor.

== Plot ==
Ostia, 1995: Vittorio and Cesare, two Roman youngsters, have known each other for a long time; their relationship is closer to being brothers than just friends. Both are dedicated to their acquaintances with various illegal activities as well as to the consumption and sale of recreational drugs, refusing the life of workers and looking for a way out from the problems of life by taking drugs. Cesare lives with his mother and niece Debora, the daughter of his sister who died due to AIDS, and who is ill herself.

One evening Vittorio, after taking several pills, has a series of hallucinations and therefore decides to change his life. He finds work at a construction site and tries to involve Cesare in order to save him too. The new life slowly takes shape, amidst all kinds of difficulties, including drug repercussions and the death of little Debora, but in the end the two begin to adapt to a more normal life. Cesare becomes engaged to Viviana, a former girlfriend of Vittorio, while Vittorio goes to live with Linda, a housewife, and her son Tommaso.

However, Cesare is not able to completely suppress the desire to return to his former life. He dies after he is shot by a store owner during a failed robbery attempt. One year later, Vittorio meets Viviana and her son, Cesare Jr., named after his late father.

== Cast ==
- Luca Marinelli as Cesare
- Alessandro Borghi as Vittorio
- Roberta Mattei as Linda
- Silvia D'Amico as Viviana
- Alessandro Bernardini as Brutto
- Valentino Campitelli as Grasso
- Danilo Cappanelli as Lungo
- Manuel Rulli as Corto

== Release ==
In October 2025, the film was screened as 'A Tribute to Claudio Caligari' at the 20th Rome Film Festival.

== Awards ==
Year	Award/Festival	Category	Winner/Nominee	Result
2015	72nd Venice International Film Festival	Pasinetti Award for Best Film	Claudio Caligari	Won
2015	72nd Venice International Film Festival	Pasinetti Award for Best Actor	Luca Marinelli	Won

== See also ==
- List of submissions to the 88th Academy Awards for Best Foreign Language Film
- List of Italian submissions for the Academy Award for Best Foreign Language Film
