= There Is a Light =

2017 film

- Directed by: Fabio Mollo
- Screenplay by: Fabio Mollo; Josella Porto
- Produced by: Donatella Botti
- Starring: Luca Marinelli; Isabella Ragonese
- Cinematography: Daria D'Antonio
- Edited by: Filippo Montemurro
- Music by: Giorgio Giampà
- Release date: 2017
- Language: Italian

There Is a Light (Italian: Il padre d'Italia, lit. ''The Father of Italy') is a 2017 Italian drama film co-written and directed by Fabio Mollo.

== Plot ==
Paolo is a lonely and introverted gay man who works as a clerk in a shop in Turin. He has just had to end an eight-year relationship because his ex, Mario, wanted to marry and start a family with him, who instead lives in an eternal present. One evening, in a dark room, he is approached by Mia, a woman six months pregnant, who faints in his arms. Paolo helps her and, after they visit the emergency room, where Mia signs for voluntary discharge because she has nowhere to go and no one to take her in, he takes her into his home.

The next day, the girl, having recovered, asks Paolo to accompany her to Asti, where her rock band and the boyfriend who had abandoned her the night before are reuniting. Paolo, very reluctantly, borrows a van from the store where he works and takes her there, only to see her rudely thrown out by the band and her boyfriend. Mia then asks to be taken to Rome, where she lived with other boys. Paolo manages to keep the van and take her there, but they find his apartment occupied: in reality, she had only been using it as a temporary shelter. Mia then wants to go to Naples, where her child's father lives.

During the trip, a deep connection develops between Paolo and Mia: the lady's exuberant personality gradually softens the guy's sullen nature, helping him come to terms with the end of his relationship. The two also share several secrets, and Paolo tells her that he grew up in an orphanage after being abandoned by his mother. Upon reaching the home of Mia's former lover, however, they are in for a nasty surprise: he died over a year ago and therefore cannot actually be the father of the unborn child, who remains unknown. Despite this, Paolo decides to stay with Mia: a strong feeling develops between the two, leading them to bond closely. The two travel to the orphanage where Paolo grew up, where he can finally confront his past. They later join Mia's family in Calabria.

Paolo experiences family life for the first time, and suggests Mia stay: he will be the baby's father, and they will live as a real family. For a while, it works: Mia teaches Paolo to swim and suggests the baby's future name, Italia. Soon, however, Mia becomes intolerant of the life she had always fled; on the one hand, her father barely says goodbye to her; on the other, during an argument with her mother, Mia confronts her with the reality that parenthood means making many sacrifices and taking on responsibilities for which she is completely unsuited. Thus, Mia decides to run away, leaving Paolo alone again.

Acknowledging that his fling with Mia was a complete folly, Paolo returns to his life, but some time later, he receives a call from a hospital in Sicily: Mia, after using drugs, was brought there unconscious, and the doctors, having detected a placental abruption, induced labor. After giving birth to the baby, the woman ran away again, not recognizing her as his. But first, he identified Paolo as Italia's biological father. The boy, finally free from his ghosts, hesitates for a moment, but then, with emotion, he recognizes the little girl, accepting the responsibilities and fears of a parent and finally thinking about his own future.

== Cast ==
- Luca Marinelli as Paolo
- Isabella Ragonese as Mia
- Mario Sgueglia as Mario
- Anna Ferruzzo as Nunzia

== Production ==
The film was produced by Bianca Film with Rai Cinema. It was shot between Rome, Turin, Naples, and the Calabrian region, namely in the cities of Reggio Calabria, Gioia Tauro and Scilla.

== Release ==
The film was released in Italian cinemas on 13 July 2017.

== Reception ==
For this film Isabella Ragonese won the Globo d'oro for best actress. The film also received four Nastro d'Argento nominations, for best actress (Ragonese), best actor (Marinelli), best supporting actress (Ferruzzo) and best original story.
