= Ordinary Happiness =

2019 Italian comedy film

- Film poster
- Italian: Momenti di trascurabile felicità
- Directed by: Daniele Luchetti
- Written by: Francesco Piccolo; Daniele Luchetti
- Starring: Pif; Thony
- Cinematography: Tommaso Fiorilli
- Edited by: Claudio Di Mauro
- Music by: Franco Piersanti
- Production companies: IBC Movie; Rai Cinema
- Distributed by: 01 Distribution
- Release date: March 14, 2019 (Italy)
- Running time: 93 minutes
- Country: Italy
- Language: Italian

Ordinary Happiness (Italian: Momenti di trascurabile felicità) is a 2019 Italian comedy-drama film directed by Daniele Luchetti.

== Cast ==
- Pif as Paolo
- Thony as Agata
- Renato Carpentieri as Paradise employee
- Franz Cantalupo as Giuseppe
- Vincenzo Ferrera as Carmine
- Roberta Caronia as Silvana
- Angelica Alleruzzo as Aurora
- Francesco Giammanco as Filippo
