= Fabio Mollo =

Italian film director (born 1980)

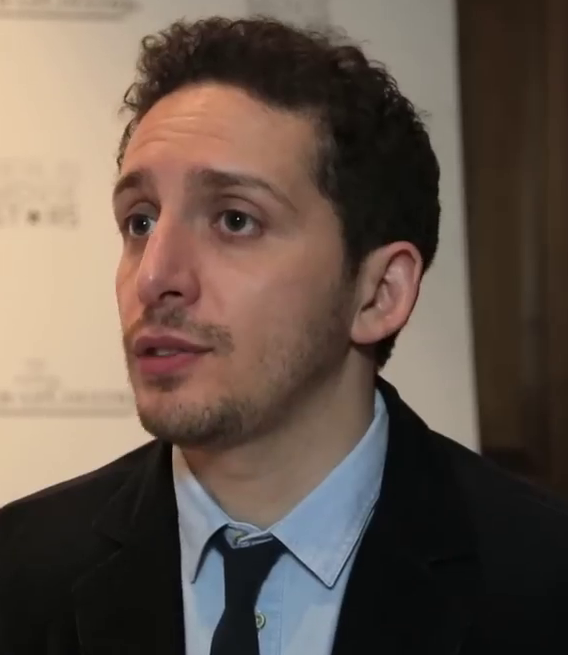
- Mollo in 2014
- Born: 27 April 1980 (age 46); Reggio Calabria, Italy
- Occupations: Director; screenwriter; producer

Fabio Mollo (born 27 April 1980) is an Italian film director and screenwriter.

== Life and career ==
Born in Reggio Calabria, Mollo graduated in Visual Theory and Film History at the University of East London, and later enrolled at the Centro Sperimentale di Cinematografia, graduating in direction in 2007. After directing some shorts, notably getting a Nastro d'Argento special mention for the 2008 short Giganti, he served as assistant director for directors such as Gianni Zanasi and Francesco Bruni.

Mollo made her feature film debut with South Is Nothing, which premiered at the 2013 Toronto International Film Festival and was later screened at the Rome Film Festival and at the Berlin International Film Festival in the Generation sidebar. For this film he was nominated for Nastro d'Argento for best new director and got a Globo d'Oro nomination for best directorial debut. His second film There Is a Light was released in 2017, and was a commercial and critical success, getting to Mollo a Nastro d'Argento nomination for best original story.

Starting from 2018, Mollo is also active as a television director, collaborating with Mediaset, RAI and Netflix, for which he directed four episodes of the series Curon. In 2021, he directed the first Amazon Prime Video Italian original film, the coming of age comedy-drama Dog Years.

== Filmography ==
=== Film ===
Year	Title	Director	Writer	Producer	Notes
2003	Troppo vento	Yes	Yes	Yes	Short film
2004	Quello che sento	Yes	Yes	Yes	Short film
2005	Al buio	Yes	Yes	No	Short film
2006	Carmilla	Yes	Yes	No	Short film
2008	Giganti	Yes	Yes	No	Short film Winner – Torino Film Festival Award for Best Short film Winner – NovaraCine Festival Best Under30 Director
2009	Un'offerta per la festa	Yes	No	No	Short film
2013	South Is Nothing	Yes	Yes	No	First full-length film Nominated – Globo d'Oro for Best Directional Debut
2013	Hakuna Matata	No	Yes	No	Short film
2015	Il miracolo	No	No	Yes	Short film
2015	Vincenzo da Crosia	Yes	Yes	No	Documentary film
2016	The Young Pope: A Tale of Filmmaking	Yes	Yes	No	Documentary film
2017	Come ieri	No	No	Yes	Also creative producer
2017	There Is a Light	Yes	Yes	No	Nominated – Nastro d'Argento for Best Screenplay
2017	Custodire e proteggere: La gendarmeria vaticana	No	Yes	No	Documentary film
2020	Shadows	No	Yes	Yes	Also creative producer
2021	Dog Years	Yes	No	No	
2022	My Soul Summer	Yes	No	No	
2023	Flesh and Bronze	Yes	Yes	No	Documentary film
2023	Born for You	Yes	Yes	No	

=== Television ===
Year	Title	Creator	Director	Writer	Producer	Notes
2016	Artists in Love	No	Yes	No	No	Docuseries; 10 episodes
2018	Come quando fuori piove	No	Yes	No	No	6 episodes
2018	Tutto può succedere	No	Yes	No	No	16 episodes (co-director, season 3)
2018	Liberi sognatori	No	Yes	No	No	Episode: "Una donna contro tutti - Renata Fonte"
2020	Curon	No	Yes	No	No	4 episodes
2021	Masantonio – Sezione scomparsi	No	Yes	No	No	5 episodes
2025	Hype	Yes	Yes	No	No	8 episodes
