= Diaz – Don't Clean Up This Blood =

2012 Italian-French-Romanian drama film

- Directed by: Daniele Vicari
- Screenplay by: Daniele Vicari; Laura Paolucci
- Produced by: Domenico Procacci
- Starring: Claudio Santamaria; Jennifer Ulrich; Elio Germano; Davide Iacopini; Ralph Amoussou; Emilie De Preissac; Fabrizio Rongione; Renato Scarpa; Mattia Sbragia; Paolo Calabresi; Alessandro Roja; Rolando Ravello; Monica Bîrlădeanu; Aylin Prandi
- Cinematography: Gherardo Gossi
- Edited by: Benni Atria
- Music by: Teho Teardo
- Production companies: Fandango; Le Pacte; Mandragora Movie.
- Distributed by: Fandango
- Release dates: 12 February 2012 (Berlin); 13 April 2012 (Italy)
- Running time: 127 minutes
- Country: Italy
- Language: Italian

Diaz – Don't Clean Up This Blood, or only Diaz, is a 2012 Italian-French-Romanian drama film directed by Daniele Vicari, focusing on the final days of the 2001 G8 summit in Genoa, Italy, when police stormed Armando Diaz, a school in Genoa. In the nighttime raid, over 300 police officers attacked activists and journalists, seriously injuring 61 and putting one in a coma.

== Plot ==
The film focuses on the storming of the Diaz school in Genoa by the police after the 2001 G8 summit. In that building were protesters against the international summit on the night between 21 and 22 July 2001. It is based on the testimonies and reports from judicial processes.

The film develops through the intertwining stories of some of the protagonists. Luca is a reporter for the Journal of Bologna. He decides to go and verify what's happening in Genoa, after the death of Carlo Giuliani. Alma is a German anarchist who participated in the fighting. Alma, Marco (a member of the Social Forum) and Franci (a lawyer for the Genoa Legal Forum) provide for the search for the missing. Anselmo is a senior activist in the Pensioners' Union. He participated in a peaceful march against the G8. Etienne and Cecile are two French anarchists: they have been directly involved in the clashes of those days. Finally Max, first assistant chief of police mobile squad of Rome: in the morning on 21 July 2001, he decided not to order a charge against the Black Block, to avoid the involvement of so many peaceful demonstrators. The destinies of all of them and hundreds of other protesters crossed the night of July 21, 2001, in the Diaz school.

== Cast ==
Many of the characters are based (in some cases maintaining the initials) to people actually inside of Diaz on the day of the blitz: the cop played by Claudio Santamaria (Max Flamini) is Michelangelo Fournier, head of the VII nucleus of the experimental mobile squad of Rome. The journalist played by Elio Germano (Luke Gualtieri, the fictional Journal of Bologna) is Lorenzo Guadagnucci, journalist of Il Resto del Carlino. UK Indymedia journalist being beaten on the street in front of Diaz is Mark Covell, who had a punctured lung and went into a coma.

- Elio Germano: Luca Gualtieri, journalist
- Claudio Santamaria: Max Flamini
- Jennifer Ulrich: Alma Koch, German anarchist
- Davide Iacopini: Marco, organizer of Genoa Social Forum
- Sarah Marecek: Inga
- Monica Elena Birladeanu: Constantine Giornal
- Ralph Amoussou: Etienne
- Pietro Ragusa: Aaron
- Pippo Delbono:
- Rolando Ravello: Rodolfo Serpieri
- Alessandro Roja: Marco Cerone
- Antonio Gerardi: Achille Faleri
- Aylin Prandi: Maria
- Jacopo Maria Bicocchi: Silvio Pieri
- Mircea Caraman: Vittorio Donati
- Ioana Picos: Gilda
- Micaela Bara: Karin
- James Longshore: Charles
- Razvan Hincu: Amico John
- Fabrizio Rongione: Nick Janssen
- Paolo Calabresi: Francesco Scaron
- Renato Scarpa: Anselmo Vitali

== Reception ==
Diaz – Don't Clean Up This Blood has an approval rating of 40% on review aggregator website Rotten Tomatoes, based on 5 reviews, and an average rating of 6.2/10.

Reviewing the film for Bring The Noise UK, Michael Dodd called it "one of the most compelling and uncompromising films of recent memory". Giving the movie a rare ten out of ten rating, he concluded by stating that "this is a film that simply has to be watched".

=== Awards and nominations ===
The film was presented at the 2012 Berlinale in the section Panorama and received the Panorama second audience award.
