= Outskirts =

Outskirts or The Outskirts may refer to:

- Rural–urban fringe, a transition zone where urban and rural land uses mix at the edges of a city or town

== Films ==
- Outskirts (film), a 1933 Soviet film by Boris Barnet
- The Outskirts (1998 film), a Russian satirical film by Pyotr Lutsik, loosely based on the 1933 film
- The Outcasts (2017 film) (working title The Outskirts), an American high-school comedy film

== Other uses ==
- Outskirts (album), a 1987 album by Blue Rodeo
- Outskirts, a 2019 album by Montgomery Gentry
- "Outskirts" (song), a 2023 song by Sam Hunt
- Outskirts (journal), a feminist journal published by the University of Western Australia
- "The Outskirts", a song by Zach Bryan from American Heartbreak, 2022
