= Every Blessed Day =

- Directed by: Paolo Virzì
- Starring: Luca Marinelli; Thony
- Cinematography: Vladan Radovic
- Music by: Thony
- Release date: 11 October 2012
- Running time: 102 minutes
- Country: Italy

Every Blessed Day (Italian: Tutti i santi giorni) is a 2012 Italian romantic comedy film directed by Paolo Virzì.

== Cast ==
- Luca Marinelli as Guido
- Thony as Antonia
- Micol Azzurro as Patrizia
- Katie McGovern as Katherine
- Claudio Pallitto as Marcello
- Stefania Felicioli as the gynecologist
- Franco Gargia as Professor Savarese
- Giovanni La Parola as Jimmy
- Frank Crudele as Antonia's father
- Mimma Pirré as Rosetta, Antonia's mother
