= A Perfect Family =

- Film poster
- Italian: Una famiglia perfetta
- Directed by: Paolo Genovese
- Starring: Sergio Castellitto; Marco Giallini; Claudia Gerini; Carolina Crescentini; Ilaria Occhini; Eugenia Costantini; Eugenio Franceschini; Francesca Neri
- Cinematography: Fabrizio Lucci
- Music by: Emanuele Bossi
- Release date: 29 November 2012
- Country: Italy
- Language: Italian

A Perfect Family (Italian: Una famiglia perfetta) is a 2012 Italian comedy film directed by Paolo Genovese. It is a remake of Fernando León de Aranoa's Familia.

== Cast ==
- Sergio Castellitto as Leone
- Claudia Gerini as Carmen
- Carolina Crescentini as Sole
- Marco Giallini as Fortunato
- Ilaria Occhini as Rosa
- Francesca Neri as Alicia
- Eugenio Franceschini as Pietro
- Eugenia Costantini as Luna
- Paolo Calabresi as Manolo
- Sergio Fiorentini as Cemetery Man
- Maurizio Mattioli as Almerico Zaniboni
