= Italian Communist Youth Federation =

Political organization in Italy

Italian Communist Youth Federation Federazione Giovanile Comunista Italiana
- Founded: 29 January 1921; 105 years ago
- Dissolved: 22 December 1990; 35 years ago
- Ideology: Before 1970s: Communism; Marxism-Leninism; After 1970s: Eurocommunism
- Position: Left-wing to far-left
- Mother party: Italian Communist Party
- International affiliation: World Federation of Democratic Youth
- Website: www.lafgci.it

The Italian Communist Youth Federation (Italian: Federazione Giovanile Comunista Italiana, FGCI) was the youth wing of the Italian Communist Party (Partito Comunista Italiano; PCI), and the direct heir of the Federazione Giovanile Comunista d'Italia of the PCd'I.

In 2016 it was refounded under the same name as the youth wing of the new Italian Communist Party.

== History ==
Constituted in 1949, its peak was in the 1960s, when its membership reached 200,000 and it thus sought to gain a profile independent of its parent organisation. The Federation's newsletters and publications thus assumed a more avant-garde role, most importantly "La città futura" (taking its name from a special issue published in February 1917 by the Federazione giovanile piemontese del Partito Socialista drawn up by Antonio Gramsci himself) and "Nuova generazione" (drawn up, not without some protests, in 1956).

On 8 October 1990 Gianni Cuperlo (the secretary of the FGCI) proposed to Ariccia, following the line of Achille Occhetto, that the FGCI be dissolved in order to create the Sinistra Giovanile, a federal organisation with the aim of creating four associations in schools, in territories, in universities, in workplaces, all federated together. The proposal was passed, with 91 votes in favour, 10 abstentions and 13 against.

On 19 December 1990, the 25th and last congress of the FGCI opened at Pesaro, and on 22 December the FGCI dissolved itself with 356 of the 491 votes (72.5%) being in favour, out of a membership of 55,000. Most of the FGCI moved to the new Democratic Party of the Left, which in 1992 gave birth to the Sinistra Giovanile del PDS (renamed simply Sinistra Giovanile in 1998). A minority, which first adhered to the Movimento per la Rifondazione Comunista and then to the Communist Refoundation Party, in 1995 gave birth to the Young Communists (GC).

When the Party of Italian Communists (PdCI) was born in 1998 as the result of a split in the PRC, the new party created the Youth Federation of Italian Communists (FGCI) on the model of the dissolved federation.

Periodicals printed by the FGCI were Gioventù d'avanguardia (1949–1953), Il costruttore (1950–1956), Nuova generazione (monthly then sometimes weekly, 1956–1977), La città futura (weekly, 1977–1979).

== National secretaries of the FGCI ==
- Luigi Polano (1921)
- Giuseppe Berti (1921–1923)
- Giuseppe Dozza (external) – Pietro Secchia (internal) (1923–1931)
- Luigi Amadesi (1931–1935)
- Celeste Negarville (1935–1938)
- Agostino Novella (1938-19xx)
- Enrico Berlinguer (1949–1956)
- Renzo Trivelli (1956–1960)
- Rino Serri (1960–1962)
- Achille Occhetto (1962–1966)
- Claudio Petruccioli (1966–1969)
- Gianfranco Borghini (1969–1972)
- Renzo Imbeni (1972–1975)
- Massimo D'Alema (1975–1980)
- Marco Fumagalli (1980–1985)
- Pietro Folena (1985–1988)
- Gianni Cuperlo (1988–1990)

== National congresses ==
Its first 7 congresses occurred in the form of the Federazione Giovanile Socialista Italiana (Fgsi)

- VIII Congress – Florence, 27 January 1921
- IX Congress – Rome, 27–28 March 1922
- X Congress – Biella, February 1926
- XI Congress – Zurich, 10 April 1931 (in exile)
- XII Congress – Livorno, 29 March-2 April 1950
- XIII Congress – Ferrara, 4–8 March 1953
- XIV Congress – Milan, 23–26 June 1955
- XV Congress – Bologna, 20–23 June 1957
- XVI Congress – Genoa, 29 September – 2 ottobre 1960
- XVII Congress – Bari, 25–29 October 1962
- XVIII Congress – Bologna, 1–4 July 1966
- XIX Congress – Florence, 26–28 March 1971
- XX Congress – Genoa, 18–21 December 1975
- XXI Congress – Florence, 19–23 April 1978
- XXII Congress – Milan, 20–23 May 1982
- XXIII Congress – Naples, 21–24 February 1985
- XXIV Congress – Bologna, 8–11 December 1988
- XXV Congress – Pesaro, 19–22 December 1990
