= Youth Federation of Italian Communists =

Youth Federation of Italian Communists Federazione Giovanile Comunisti Italiani
- Founded: 12 December 2004
- Ideology: Communism
- International affiliation: World Federation of Democratic Youth
- Colours: Red

Website
- www.fgci.it

The Youth Federation of Italian Communists (Italian: Federazione Giovanile Comunisti Italiani, or FGCI) was the youth wing of the Party of Italian Communists (PdCI). Internationally, it is part of the World Federation of Democratic Youth.

In 2016 it changed its name into Italian Young Communist Federation, given the transformation of its reference party into the Italian Communist Party. The organisation maintained the same acronym (FGCI).

== Composition and activities ==
Members of the PCI of between 14 and 29 years of age automatically become members of FGCI. It is centred on Marxism, the Italian Resistance, and the subjects of peace, rights, the environment, work and education.

The new Federazione Giovanile Comunisti Italiani, although already locally organised in several locations throughout Italy by 31 July 1999, was officially constituted during its first national conference between 11 and il 12 December 2004 a Fiuggi (FR), at which Francesco Francescaglia was elected its national co-ordinator, in place of Alessandro Pignatiello, and was given national coordination and direction. The name, as for the PdCI, was selected to mirror in its acronym the heritage of the Italian Communist Party dissolved in 1991, as in Italian the old Italian Communist Youth Federation was also shortened as FGCI.

In July 2001 it protested at the G8 summit in Genoa within the Genoa Social Forum. In the course of 2006 the federation saw its membership rise to 6000, with a solid presence in almost every area of Italy. At its national conference in 2007, Francesco Francescaglia left office to join the adult Communist party, and Riccardo Messina was elected to replace him.

== National coordination committee ==
- Riccardo Messina: National Coordinator.
- Flavio Arzarello: Organisation.
- Lucia Ioime: Schools and movements.
- Giordano Otello Marilli: Foreign relations, culture and training.
- Elisa Mariotti: Work and nurseries.
- Valerio Nicolosi: Social politics, migrants and anti-prohibition.
- Stefano Perri: Anti-mafia, communication, national affairs, environment.
- Francesca Ricci: Direct responsibilities.
- Francesca Scarpato: Universities.

== National conferences ==
- I^{a} Conference - Fiuggi (FR), 11–12 December 2004
- II^{a} Conference - Fiuggi (FR), 1-2–3 June 2007 - Resistenza Attiva

== National coordinators ==
- Alessandro Pignatiello (31 July 1999 - 24 April 2004), with national responsibility
- Francesco Francescaglia (24 April 2004 - 3 June 2007), with national responsibility up until 12 December 2004
- Riccardo Messina (3 June 2007 – present)

== Associated organisations ==
- Resistenza Studentesca student association

The Federazione also collaborates with UDS, ReDS and Unione degli Universitari.
