= Luca Marinelli =

Italian actor

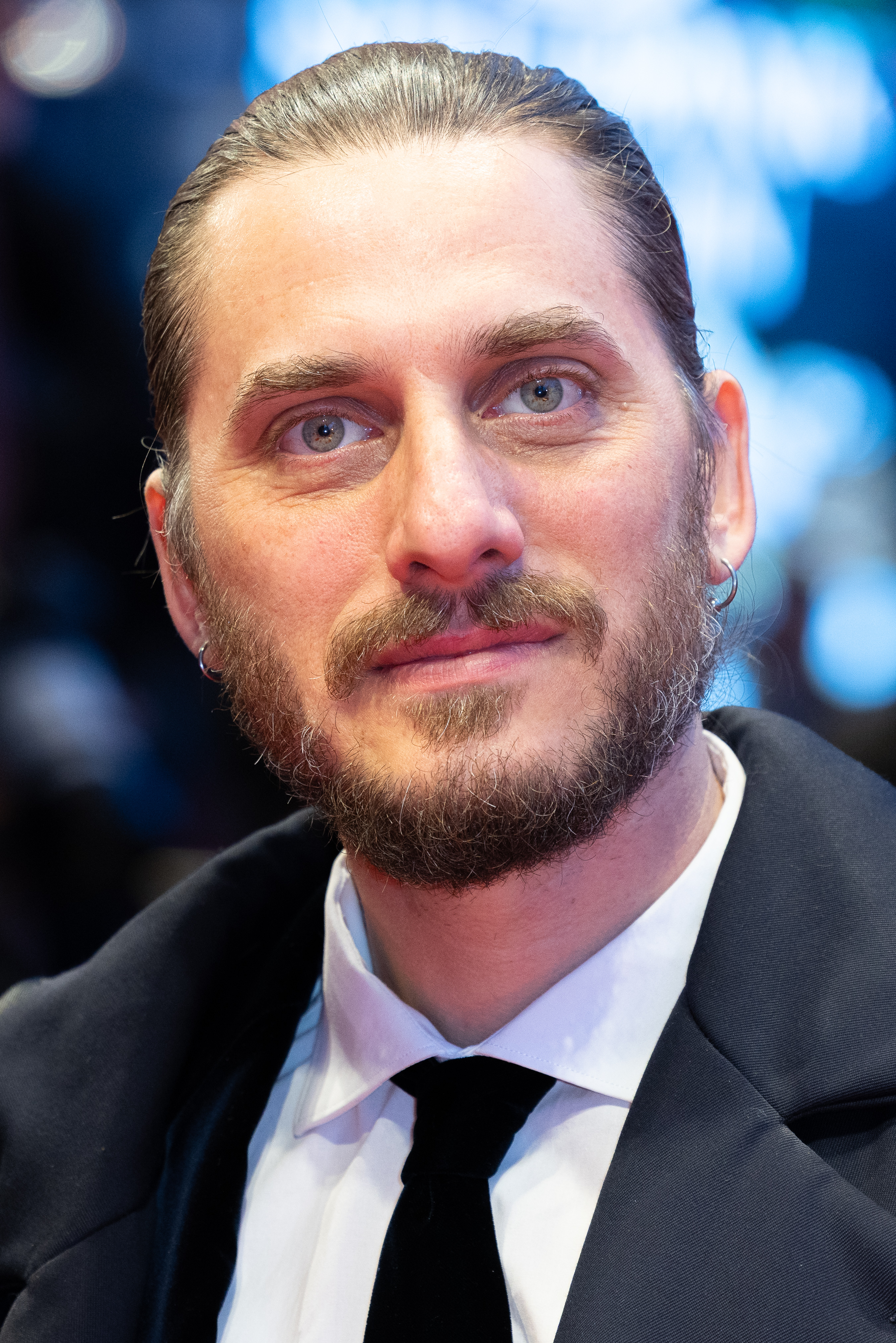
- Marinelli in 2025
- Born: 22 October 1984 (age 41); Rome, Italy
- Occupation: Actor
- Spouse: Alissa Jung

Luca Marinelli (born 22 October 1984) is an Italian actor. He is best known for the roles of Mattia in The Solitude of Prime Numbers (2010), Guido in Every Blessed Day (2012), Andrea in The Great Beauty (2013), Cesare in Don't Be Bad (2015), The Gipsy in They Call Me Jeeg (2016), the title character of Martin Eden (2019), Nicky in The Old Guard (2020), the title character of Diabolik (2021), and Neil in Hideo Kojima's video game Death Stranding 2: On the Beach (2025).

== Biography ==
Born in Rome, Marinelli is the son of actor and voice actor Eugenio Marinelli, and the nephew of actress and voice actress Sonia Scotti. He enrolled at the Silvio D'Amico National Academy of Dramatic Art, graduating in 2009. Occasionally appearing on stage since 2006, his breakout role was Mattia, the leading character in the Saverio Costanzo's 2010 drama film The Solitude of Prime Numbers. In 2013 he was appointed EFP Shooting Star at the Berlin International Film Festival for his performance in Paolo Virzì's Every Blessed Day. Marinelli also played a supporting role in the Academy Award-winning drama The Great Beauty by Paolo Sorrentino.

For his role of Cesare in Claudio Caligari's final film Don't Be Bad, he won the Pasinetti Award for Best Actor at the 72nd Venice International Film Festival.

In 2016 he won the Nastro d'Argento and David di Donatello for Best Supporting Actor for They Call Me Jeeg, and in 2019 he won the Volpi Cup for Best Actor for his portrayal of the titular character Martin Eden at the 76th Venice International Film Festival. He also played the antagonist Primo in the 2018 TV series Trust, and starred as Nicky in the Netflix film The Old Guard. In 2018, he portrayed the Italian singer-songwriter Fabrizio De André in Fabrizio De André: Principe libero.

He starred as Diabolik in the 2021 film based on the comics series. In 2022, he plays Pietro Guasti in The Eight Mountains (Italian: Le otto montagne) by Felix Van Groeningen and Charlotte Vandermeersch, based on the novel of the same name by Paolo Cognetti. Marinelli received critical acclaim for his portrayal of Benito Mussolini in the 2024 series Mussolini: Son of the Century.

In 2025, it was announced that he and his wife, Alissa Jung, will play the characters Neil and Lucy, respectively, in Hideo Kojima's 2025 video game Death Stranding 2: On the Beach.

== Filmography ==
=== Film ===
Key
†	Denotes works that have not yet been released

Year	Title	Role	Notes
2010	The Solitude of Prime Numbers	Mattia Balossino (adult)	
2011	The Last Man on Earth	Roberta	
2012	Every Blessed Day	Guido Caselli	
2012	Mary of Nazareth	Joseph	Television film
2012	Nina	Fabrizio	
2012	Waves	Gabriele	
2013	The Great Beauty	Andrea	
2015	Il mondo fino in fondo	Loris	
2015	Don't Be Bad	Cesare	
2015	They Call Me Jeeg	Fabio	
2016	A Dangerous Fortune	Mickey Miranda	Television film
2016	Slam	Valerio	
2017	There Is a Light	Paolo	
2017	Let Yourself Go	Ettore	
2017	Rainbow: A Private Affair	Milton	
2018	Fabrizio De André: Principe libero	Fabrizio De André	
2018	Remember?	Him	
2019	Martin Eden	Martin Eden	
2020	The Old Guard	Nicolò 'Nicky' di Genoa	
2021	Diabolik	Diabolik	
2022	The Eight Mountains	Pietro	
2024	Mufasa: The Lion King	Mufasa	Italian dub; voice role
2025	Paternal Leave	Father	
2025	The Old Guard 2	Nicolò 'Nicky' di Genoa	
2026	The Echo Chamber	Leo	

=== TV ===
Year	Title	Role	Notes
2005	Ricomincio da me		TV series; 2 episodes
2008	I Cesaroni	Male friend	TV series; episode 2x09
2008	Provaci ancora prof!	Fabrizio	TV series; episode 3x06
2009	Butta la luna		TV series; episode 2x02
2018	Trust	Primo	FX miniseries; 8 episodes
2024	Mussolini: Son of the Century	Benito Mussolini	Lead role

=== Video games ===
Year	Title	Role	Notes
2025	Death Stranding 2: On the Beach	Neil Vana	Motion Capture, Voice and Likeness

== Awards and nominations ==
Awards and nominations received by Luca Marinelli
Award	Year	Work	Category	Result
Ciak d'oro	2016	They Call Me Jeeg	Best Supporting Actor	Won
David di Donatello	2013	Every Blessed Day	Best Actor in a Leading Role	Nominated
David di Donatello	2016	Don't Be Bad	Best Actor in a Leading Role	Nominated
David di Donatello	2016	They Call Me Jeeg	Best Actor in a Supporting Role	Won
David di Donatello	2019	Fabrizio De André: Principe libero	Best Actor in a Leading Role	Nominated
David di Donatello	2020	Martin Eden	Best Actor in a Leading Role	Nominated
David di Donatello	2023	The Eight Mountains	Best Actor in a Leading Role	Nominated
Globo d'Oro (Italian Golden Globe)	2012	Every Blessed Day	Best Actor	Nominated
Globo d'Oro (Italian Golden Globe)	2017	There Is a Light	Best Actor	Nominated
Globo d'Oro (Italian Golden Globe)	2018	Rainbow: A Private Affair	Best Actor	Won^{[i]}
Globo d'Oro (Italian Golden Globe)	2020	Martin Eden	Best Actor	Nominated
Nastro d'Argento	2012	Every Blessed Day	Best Actor	Nominated
Nastro d'Argento	2016	They Call Me Jeeg	Best Supporting Actor	Won
Nastro d'Argento	2017	There Is a Light	Best Actor	Nominated
Nastro d'Argento	2023	The Eight Mountains	Best Actor	Won
Venice International Film Festival	2015	Don't Be Bad	Pasinetti Award for Best Actor	Won
Venice International Film Festival	2019	Martin Eden	Volpi Cup for Best Actor	Won
Vittorio Gassman Award	2015	Don't Be Bad	Best Actor	Won

^{^[i]}Ex-aequo with Toni Servillo for The Girl in the Fog.
