= 27th G8 summit =

2001 international leader meeting in Italy

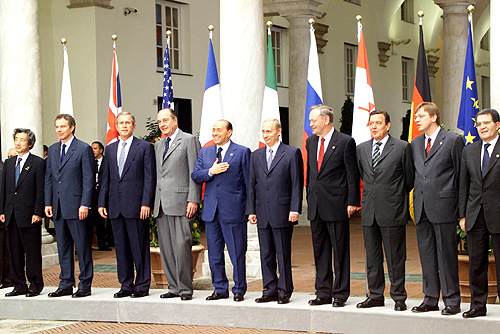
- Host country: Italy
- Date: 19–22 July 2001
- Cities: Genoa
- Venues: Doge's Palace
- Participants: Canada; France; Germany; Italy; Japan; Russia; United Kingdom; United States; European Union
- Follows: 26th G8 summit
- Precedes: 28th G8 summit

The 27th G8 summit was held in Genoa, Italy, on 19–22 July 2001 and is remembered as a highpoint of the worldwide anti-globalization movement as well as for human rights violations against demonstrators.

== Overview ==
The Group of Seven (G7) was an unofficial forum which brought together the heads of the richest industrialized countries: France, Germany, Italy, Japan, the United Kingdom, the United States, and Canada starting in 1976. The G8, meeting for the first time in 1997, was formed with the addition of Russia. In addition, the President of the European Commission has been formally included in summits since 1981. The summits were not meant to be linked formally with wider international institutions; and in fact, a mild rebellion against the stiff formality of other international meetings was a part of the genesis of cooperation between France's president Valéry Giscard d'Estaing and West Germany's chancellor Helmut Schmidt as they conceived the initial summit of the Group of Six (G6) in 1975.

The G8 summits during the 21st-century have inspired widespread debates, protests and demonstrations; and the two-or three-day event becomes more than the sum of its parts, elevating the participants, the issues, and the venue as focal points for activist pressure.

== Leaders at the summit ==
The 27th G8 summit was the first summit for Japanese Prime Minister Junichirō Koizumi and US President George W. Bush.

=== Participants ===
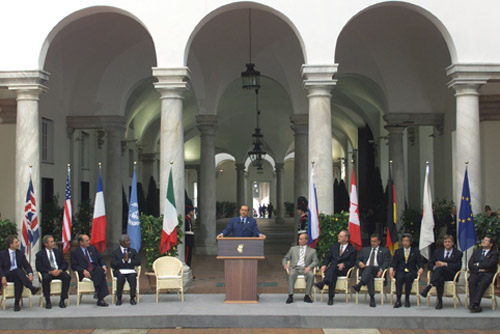
Opening ceremony on 20 July 2001

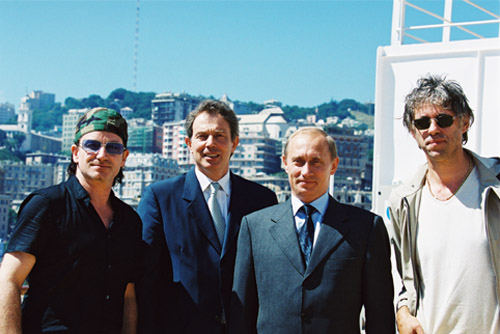
Bono, Tony Blair, Vladimir Putin, and Bob Geldof

These summit participants were the current "core members" of the international forum:

**Core G8 members** Host state and leader are shown in bold text.
Member		Represented by	Title
(Canada)	Canada	Jean Chrétien	Prime Minister
(France)	France	Jacques Chirac	President
(Germany)	Germany	Gerhard Schröder	Chancellor
(Italy)	**Italy**	**Silvio Berlusconi**	**Prime Minister**
(Japan)	Japan	Junichiro Koizumi	Prime Minister
(Russia)	Russia	Vladimir Putin	President
(United Kingdom)	United Kingdom	Tony Blair	Prime Minister
(United States)	United States	George W. Bush	President
(European Union)	European Union	Romano Prodi	Commission President
**Guest Invitees (Countries)**
Member		Represented by	Title
(Algeria)	Algeria	Abdelaziz Bouteflika	President
(Bangladesh)	Bangladesh	Shahabuddin Ahmed	President
(Belgium)	Belgium	Guy Verhofstadt	Prime Minister and European Council President
(Mali)	Mali	Alpha Oumar Konare	President
**Guest Invitees (International Institutions)**
Member		Represented by	Title
	International Monetary Fund	Horst Köhler	managing director
(United Nations)	United Nations	Kofi Annan	Secretary-General
	World Bank	James Wolfensohn	President
	World Trade Organization	Mike Moore	Director-General

== Priorities ==
Traditionally, the host country of the G8 summit sets the agenda for negotiations, which take place primarily amongst multi-national civil servants in the weeks before the summit itself, leading to a joint declaration which all countries can agree to sign.

== Issues ==
The summit was intended as a venue for resolving differences among its members. As a practical matter, the summit was also conceived as an opportunity for its members to give each other mutual encouragement in the face of difficult economic decisions.

The overall theme of the summit was ways to reduce poverty. Topics discussed at the meeting included an evaluation of the Enhanced HIPC Initiative which involved debt forgiveness to Heavily indebted poor countries, the Global Health Fund, the global digital divide, the environment, and food security. Although the main summit was from 20 to 22 July, the summit was preceded by a meeting of the G8 foreign ministers on the 18th and 19th.

The summit was overshadowed by riots in the city after a crackdown by police targeting anti-globalisation groups and the death of 23-year-old Carlo Giuliani, leading some to talk of a deliberately followed strategy of tension.

Before the summit, significant controversies and ridicule among local people and media focused on the security plans (such as fences going through streets and inside houses) and image provisions (such as the prohibition to dry up the laundry).

== Citizens' responses and authorities' counter-responses ==
=== Protests ===
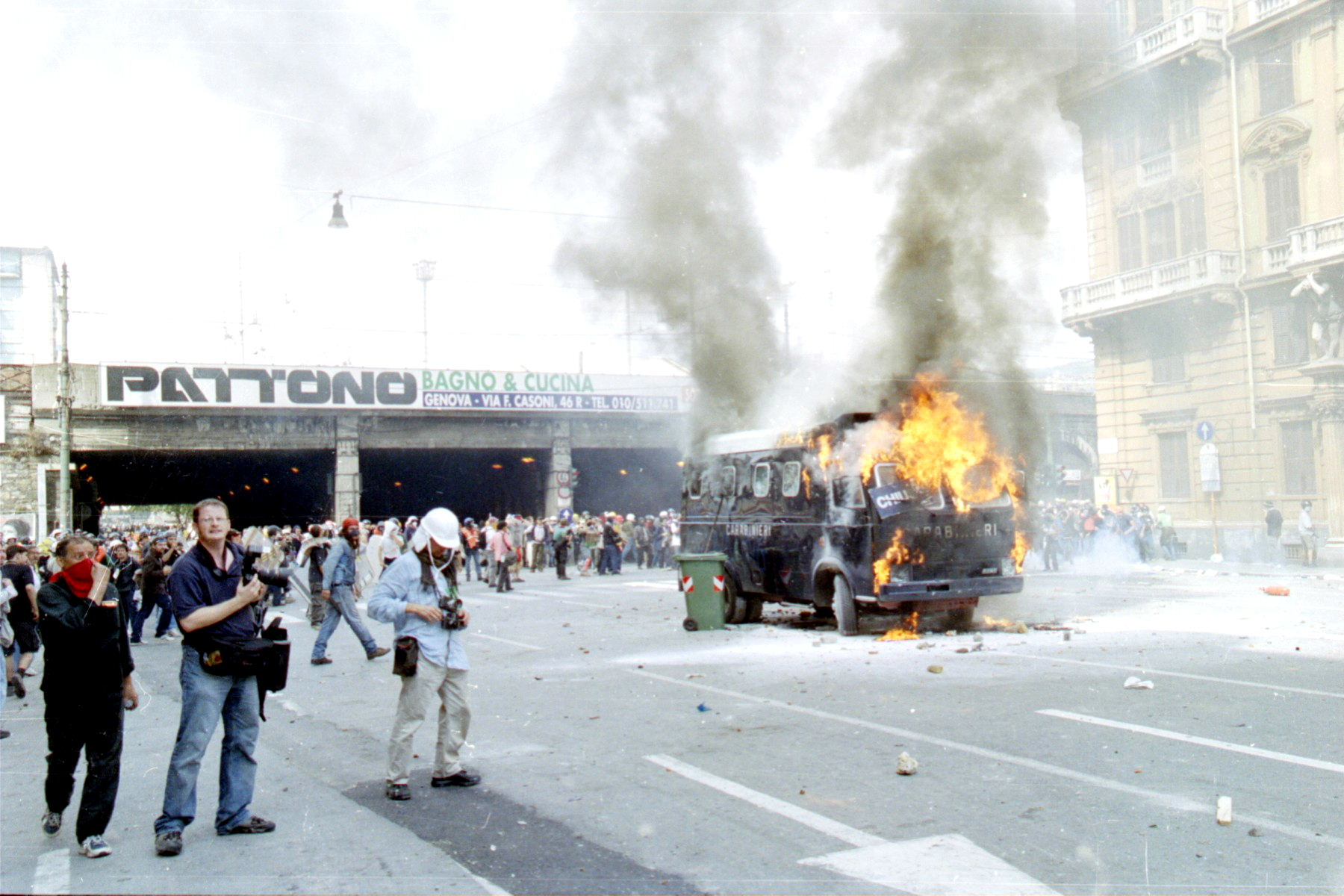
Protesters burning a Carabinieri vehicle

The Genoa G8 Summit protest, 19 to 22 July 2001, was a dramatic protest, drawing an estimated 200,000 demonstrators. Dozens were hospitalized following clashes with police and night raids by security forces on two schools housing activists and independent journalists. People taken into custody after the raids have alleged severe abuse at the hands of police.

Demonstrators accused the police of brutality and denying them their right to non-violent protest. They believe that G8 summits are non-legitimate attempts by eight of the world's most powerful governments to set the rules for the planet at large. Police and many politicians argued that attempting to blockade a meeting is in itself a violent event and an attempt to impede the workings of democratically elected governments..

The G8 meeting was held inside a "Red Zone" in the center of town that had been declared off-limits for non-residents and surrounded by a barricade, leaving protesters no chance to communicate with summit delegates. Fears of a terrorist attack at the time had also led to an air exclusion zone around the city, as well as the stationing of anti-aircraft missiles. Only one activist, Valérie Vie, secretary of a French branch of ATTAC, managed to publicly breach the Red Zone barrier, but was immediately arrested by police agents. There were also several border riots ahead of the summit, as police attempted to prevent suspected activists from entering Italy. The Italian government suspended freedom of movement entitled by the Schengen Treaty for the duration of the G8 summit, to monitor the movement of the many protesters arriving from across the European Union.

=== Injuries and deaths ===
Many demonstrators were injured and dozens more arrested over the course of the event. Most of those 329 arrested were charged with criminal conspiracy to commit destruction; but they were in most part released shortly thereafter because judges declared the charges invalid. Police continued to raid social centers, media centers, union buildings and legal offices across Italy after the summit as part of ongoing investigations. Over 400 protesters and about 100 among security forces were injured during the clashes.

On 20 July a 23-year-old activist Carlo Giuliani of Genoa, was shot dead by Mario Placanica, a Carabiniere, during clashes with police. Images show Giuliani picking up a fire extinguisher from the ground and approaching the Carabinieri's vehicle with it before he was shot and then run over twice by the Land Rover. Placanica was acquitted from any wrongdoing, as judges determined he fired in self-defence and to the sky but a flying stone deflected the bullet and killed Giuliani. The idea that the stone killed Giuliani has been however questioned on the basis of a security video and the stone being covered in blood while the balaclava through which it should have wounded Giuliani was intact. Videos and photos show that the stone was dipped in blood and placed beside Giuliani's head minutes after his death suggesting an attempt to conceal the police responsibility. Later tribunals including the European Court of Human Rights confirmed that Giuliani was killed directly by the bullet.

Activist Susanne Bendotti was struck by a vehicle and killed while attempting to cross the French-Italian border at Ventimiglia to get to the Genoa demonstration.

=== Charges ===
In December 2007, 25 demonstrators were condemned for property damage and looting.

Numerous police officers and local and national officials have been ordered to stand trial in connection with the event. In one trial, 28 police officials are standing trial on charges related to the two night raids, charged with conspiracy to pervert the course of justice, use of excessive force and planting evidence. In other proceedings, 45 state officials, including prison guards, police and medics, are being tried for abusing detainees in their custody at Bolzaneto who were arrested during the raid. Detainees reported being spat at, verbally and physically humiliated, and threatened with rape.

Police conducted nighttime raids upon centers housing protesters and campsites, most notably the attacks on the Diaz-Pascoli and Diaz-Pertini schools shortly after midnight on 21 July. These were being used as sleeping quarters, and had also been set up as centers for those providing media, medical, and legal support work. Police baton attacks left three activists, including British journalist Mark Covell, in comas. At least one person has suffered brain damage, while another had both jaws and fourteen teeth broken. In total, over 60 were severely injured and a parliamentary inquiry was launched. It concluded no wrongdoing on the part of police.

Ninety-three people were arrested during the raids. In May 2003 Judge Anna Ivaldi concluded that they had put up no resistance whatsoever to the police and all charges were dropped against them. During the inquiry, Pietro Troiani, the deputy police chief in Genoa, admitted to being involved in the planting of Molotov cocktails to justify the Diaz School raids, as well as faking the stabbing of a police officer to frame activists.

In 2005, twenty-nine police officers were indicted for grievous bodily harm, planting evidence and wrongful arrest during a night-time raid on the Diaz School. The Molotov cocktails were reported in January 2007, during the trial of the policemen, to have disappeared.

In 2007, Romano Prodi's left-wing L'Unione coalition voted to create a Parliamentary Commission on the Genoa events but this commission was refused by Senate's vote.

On 14 July, 13 Italian Carabineri, GOMPI Mobile and prison police were convicted for abuse of authority, abuse of office and uniform. Other charges include abuse and negligence. Two medical staff were also convicted. None will go to jail due to statute of limitations.

On 13 November an Italian court cleared 16 of the most senior police officers of any wrongdoing in the incidents of the 2001 G8 summit. Thirteen police officers were convicted of their various crimes during the Diaz raid including Vincenzo Canterini (four years), the commander of the 7th Mobile unit. None will go to jail due to statute of limitations.

However, on appeal in 2010, many of the findings were overturned, and several more senior police officers received prison sentences and disqualifications from public office. Twenty-five of the 27 original defendants were finally convicted. In statements during the trial, the prosecution cited "the terrible injuries inflicted on defenceless people, the premeditation, the covered faces, the falsification of statements by the 93 anti-globalisation protesters, the lies about their alleged resistance [to arrest]."

The Italian government was later brought to trial in the European Court of Human Rights. In April 2017 the case for Bolzaneto station was dismissed as Italy and victims made an off-court refunding deal with the Italian government paying €45,000 per victim and acknowledging the extreme use of violence. In October 2017, the European Court issued two sentences against Italy, the first time declaring that torture was clearly used against the contestants on the Diaz school case, and the second time inflicting a penal fee to Italy for lacking a Torture Law in its penal code, meaning that the Genoa events could not be properly sentenced at the time as unmotivated violence leading to torture.

== TV/Video ==
- A documentary of the events called Berlusconi's Mousetrap was made by Indymedia.ie.
- An episode of the anthology television series Tutto in un Giorno was filmed during the event
- A documentary of the events called Bella Ciao was made with footage from different sources.
- A German documentary, "Gipfelstürmer – Die blutigen Tage von Genua" won the German broadcast television award (Deutscher Fernsehpreis) as the best documentary of 2002.
- An Italian documentary "Black Bloc" featuring interviews with seven activists who experienced the Diaz raid. It was shown at the 2011 Venice Biennale.
- A feature film of the events at the Diaz schools called "Diaz – Don't Clean Up This Blood" was made as a Romanian – Italian co-production by Fandango, Mandragora Movies, Le Pacte production, in association with Sofica A Plus, Image 3, shown in 2012 Berlinale.
- Genova G8 2001 – Video Archive – curated by Documenta/Film

== Business opportunity ==
For some, the G8 summit became a profit-generating event; as for example, the official G8 Summit magazines which have been published under the auspices of the host nations for distribution to all attendees since 1998. Capitalizing on the publicity which attended the Genoa summit, the Commercial Office of the Italian embassies and the consulates joined others in promoting investment in southern Italy.

== Gallery of participating leaders ==
=== Core G8 participants ===
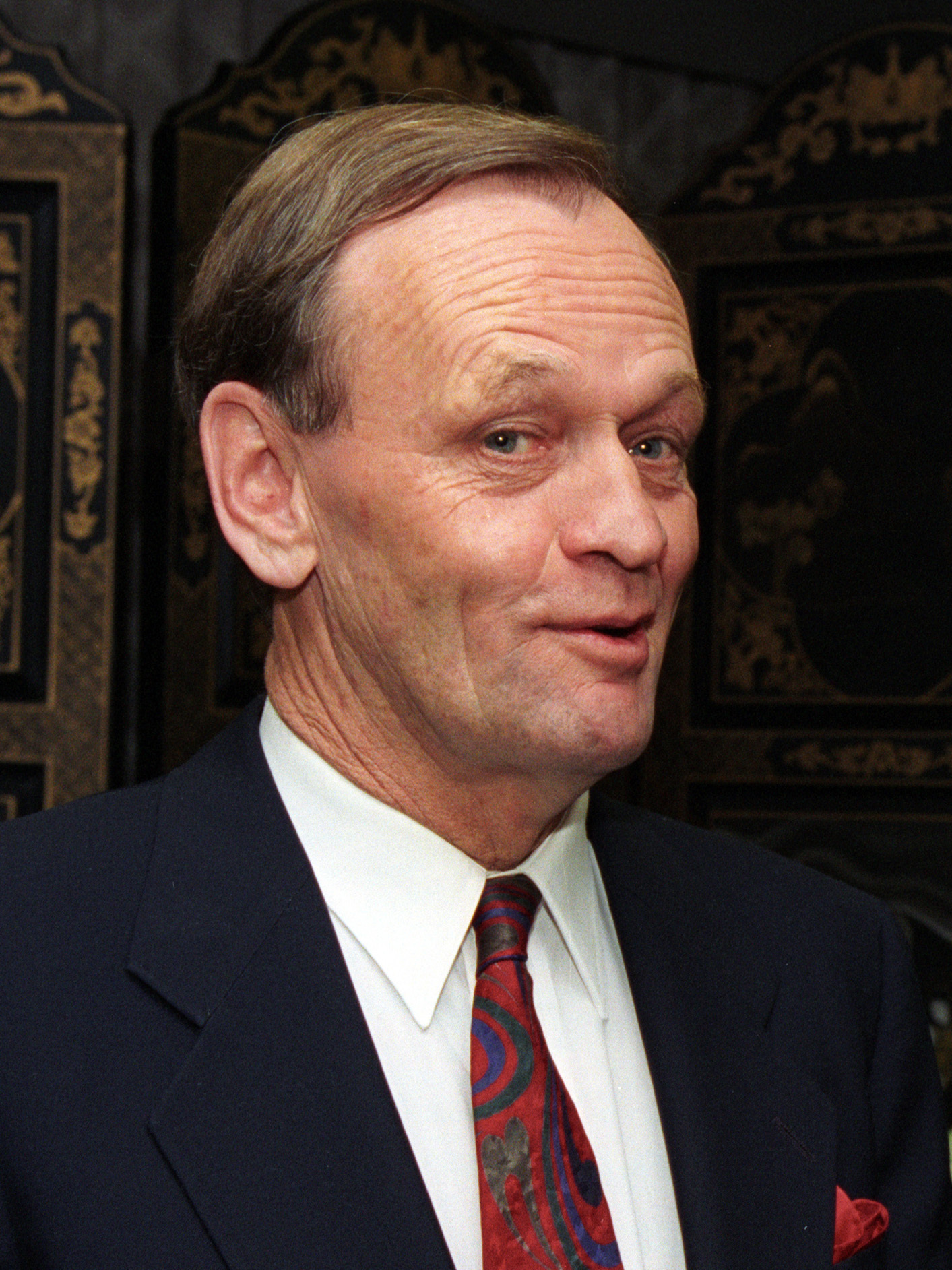
(Canada) Canada
Jean Chrétien,
Prime Minister

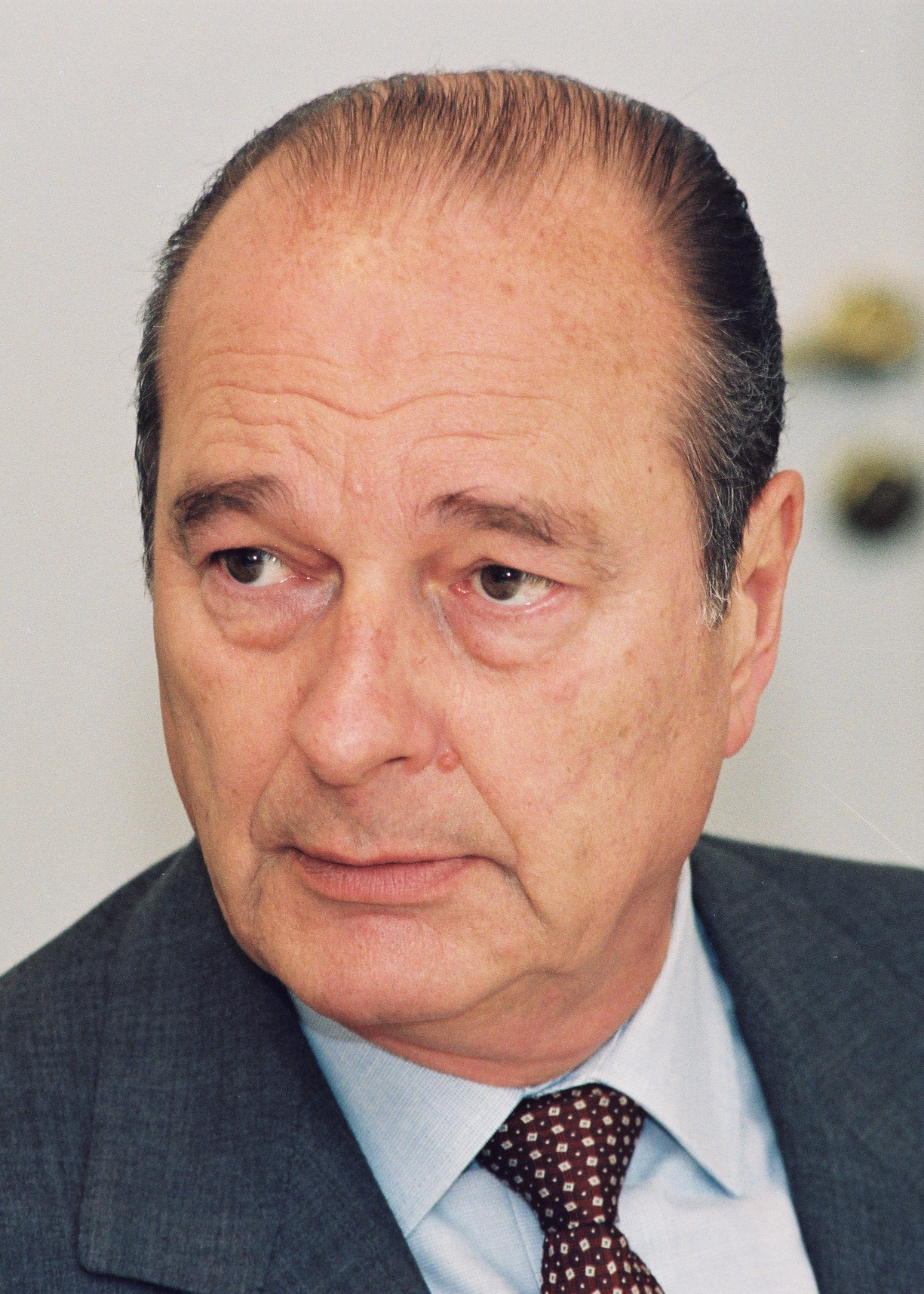
(France) France
Jacques Chirac,
President

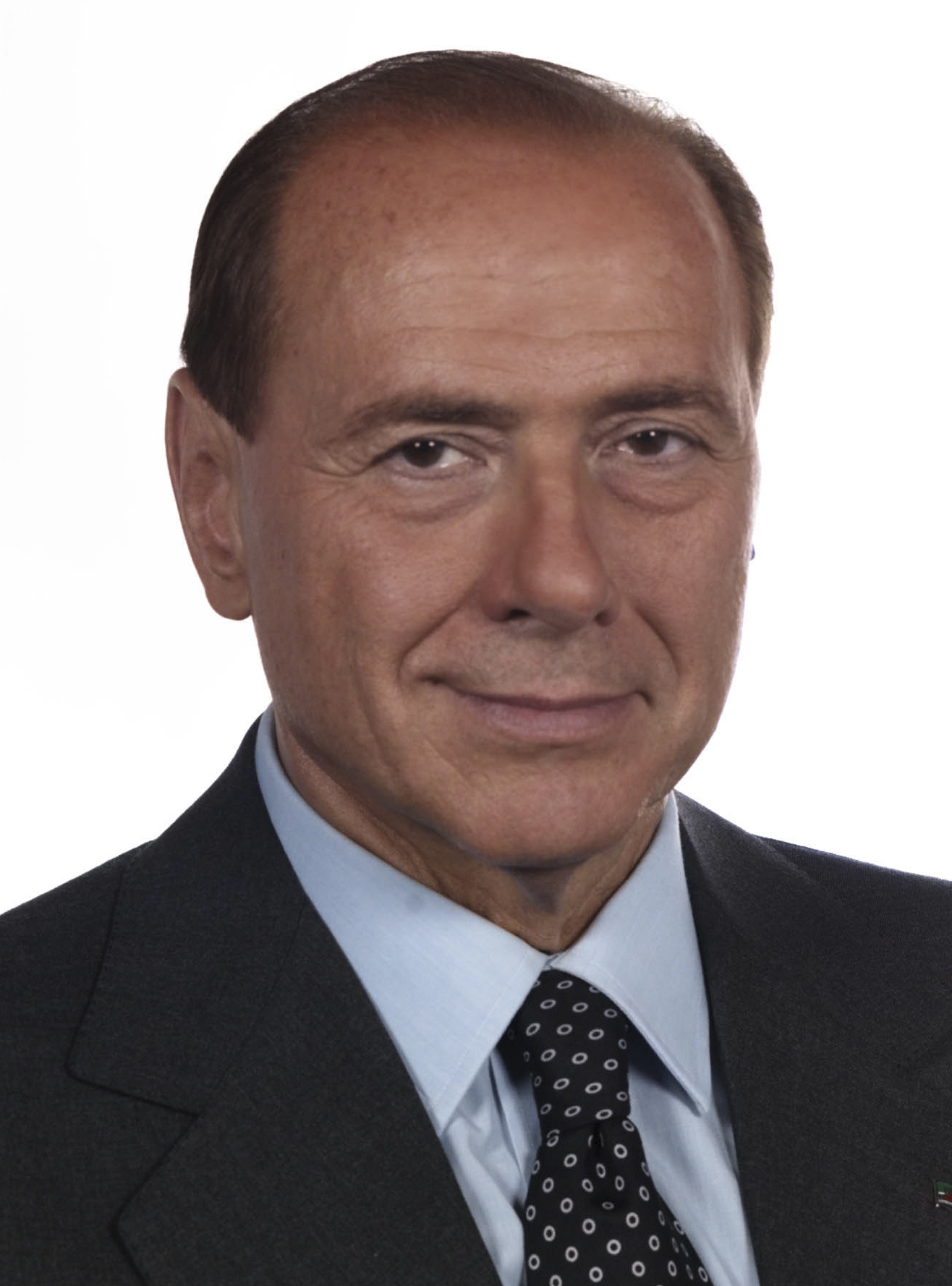
(Italy) Italy
Silvio Berlusconi,
Prime Minister (Host)

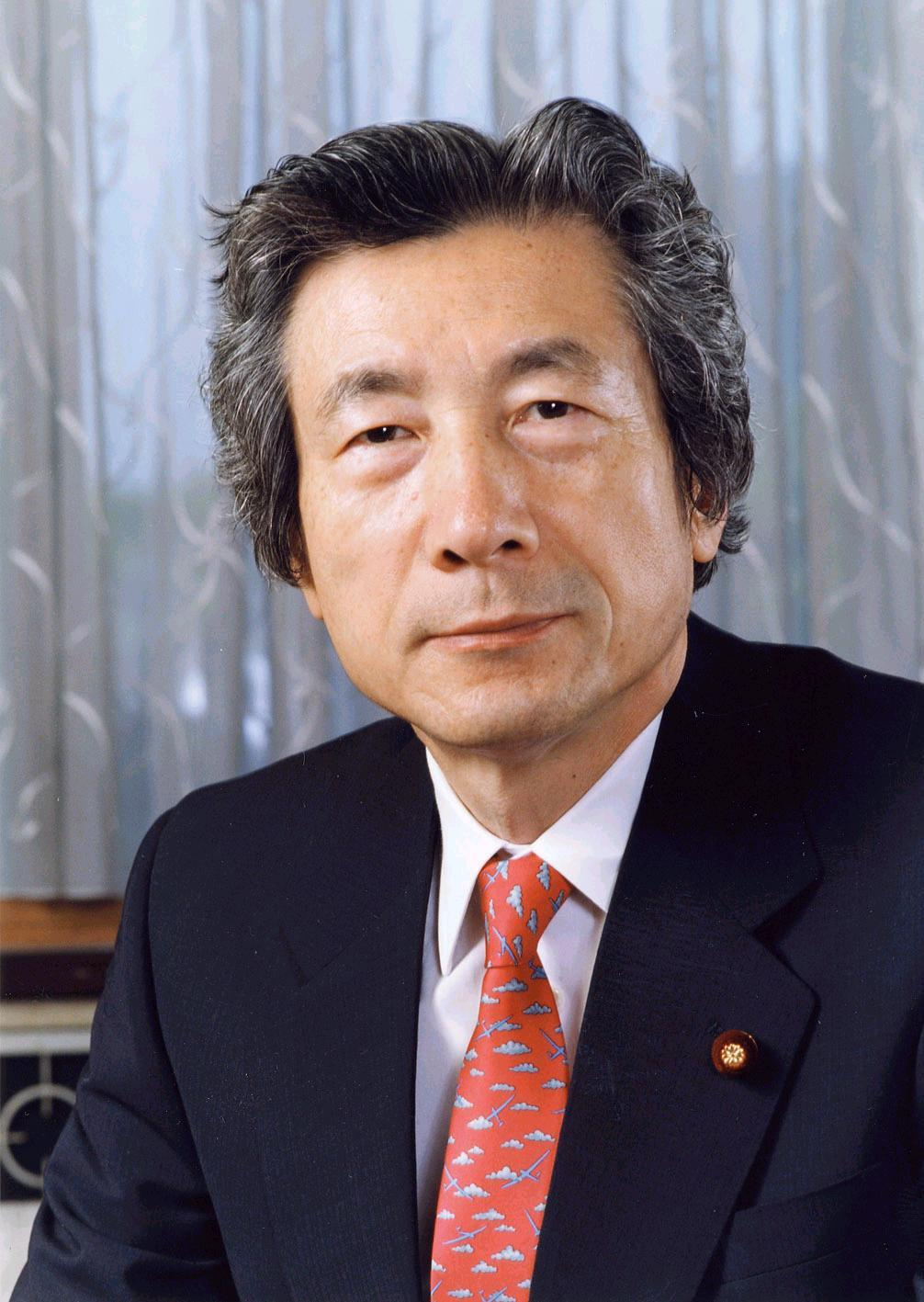
(Japan) Japan
Junichirō Koizumi,
Prime Minister

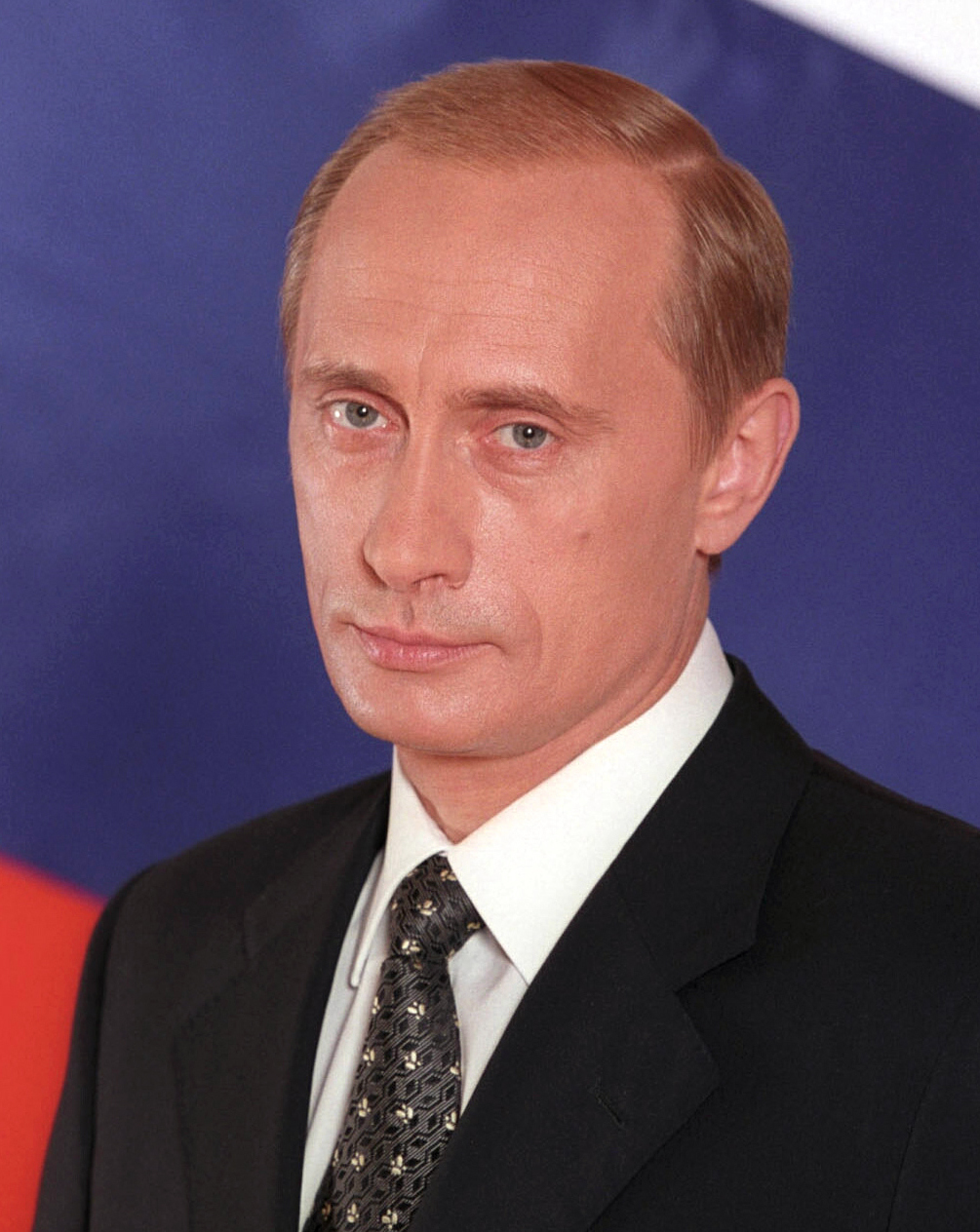
(Russia) Russia
Vladimir Putin,
President

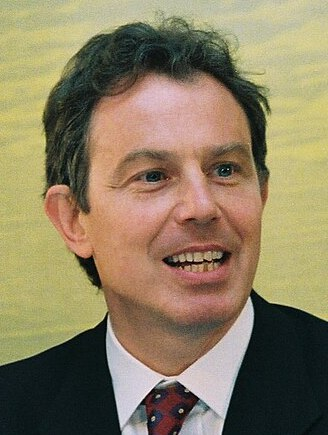
(United Kingdom) United Kingdom
Tony Blair,
Prime Minister

(United States) United States
George W. Bush,
President
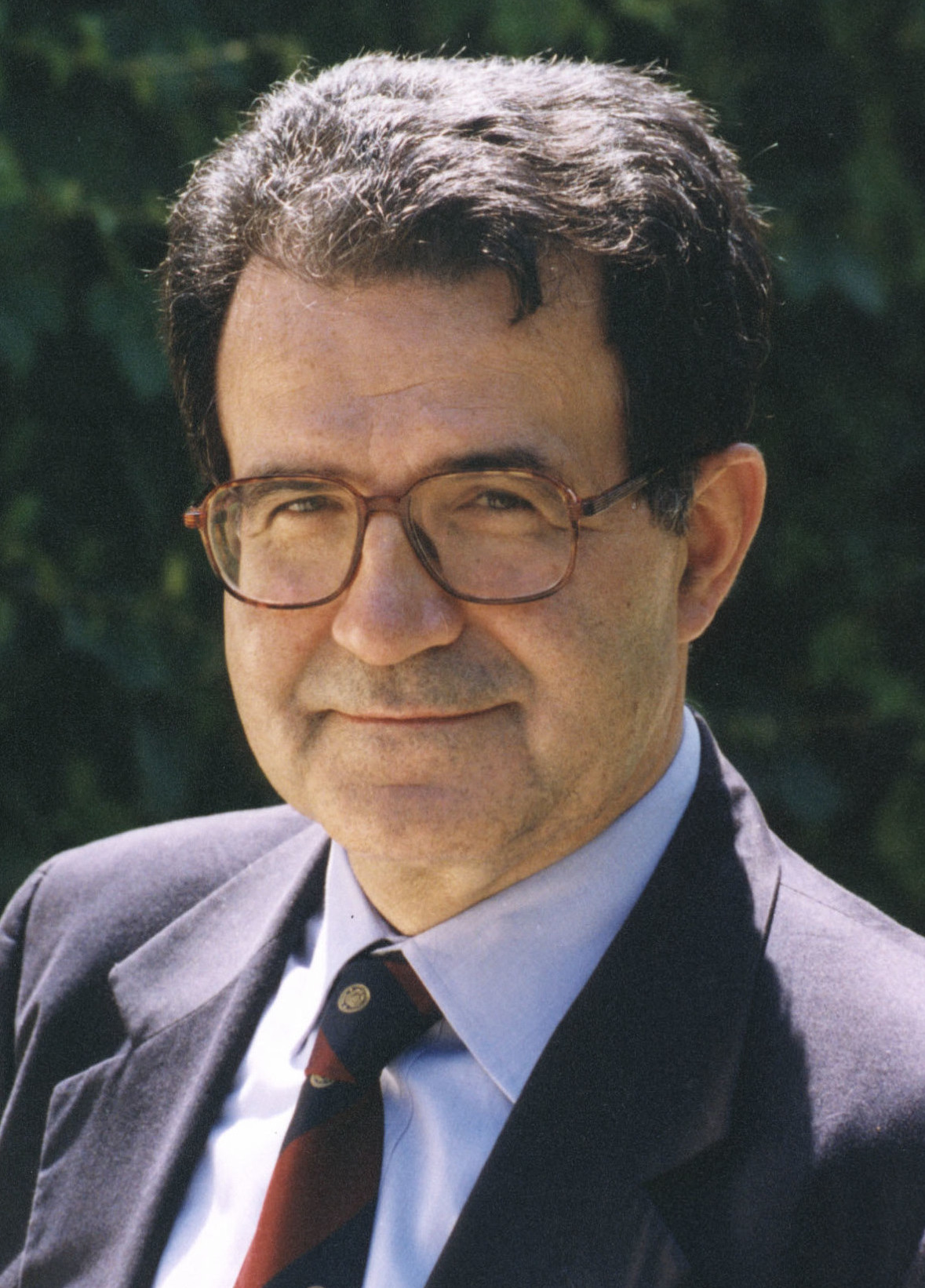
(European Union) European Union
Romano Prodi,
Commission President

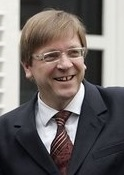
(European Union) European Union
Guy Verhofstadt,
Prime Minister of Belgium, rotating Council President

== See also ==
- 1999 Seattle WTO protests
- 2001 raid on the Diaz school
- Anti-globalization movement
- Corruption in Italy
- Publixtheatre Caravan
