= TIMvision =

Telecom Italia video service

- Other names: Cubovision (2009-2014)
- Developer: TIM
- Release: 16 December 2009; 16 years ago
- Operating system: Web browser, Android, iOS, Windows, Xbox One, smart TVs
- Predecessor: IPTV di Telecom Italia
- Available in: Italian
- Type: Digital distribution
- Website: www.timvision.it

TIMvision (formerly Cubovision) is an Italian Internet video on demand service by TIM.

It offers television shows, movies, and series, for rental or purchase through the use of a decoder as well as video on demand, smart TV, Android, and iOS device. From 2018, TIMvision produces original TV shows, such as the Italian version of Skam, known as Skam Italia.

== History ==
=== Cubovision ===
In 2007, Franco Bernabè returned to Telecom Italia from two years later, with the entrepreneur and innovation director of Telecom Italia Luca Tomassini, he created Cubovision as a set-top box that offered the possibility of accessing video on demand television content and managing more TV platforms, such as digital terrestrial or Web TV. On 16 December 2009 Telecom presents the first Cubovision model in Milan. The industrial design of the set-top box was conceived by Luca Tomassini and created by Visione, the production by Finmek and the marketing by Amino Communications.

Telecom Italia launched Cubovision in January 2010 in an experimental version of the same, with an open innovation model. The first models published on the market were beta versions that were updated with functionality with subsequent models.

On 15 December 2010, Telecom Italia presented in Milan the new model of the platform equipped with Intel microprocessors, totally revisited and with broadcasting and broadband functionality. The new version included more than 1500 monthly programming hours, with over 200 titles per month within a catalog made up of TV series, cartoons, concerts, documentaries and films. In the same period, Telecom Italia made Cubovision's official application on Apple and Samsung stores to connect to the platform via tablet or smartphone.

=== TIMvision ===
On 12 May 2014, Cubovision changed its name to TIMvision.

In June 2015, Telecom Italia finalized a two-year agreement with the 20th Century Fox with the intent to include some of the Fox's productions on the platform. Following an agreement with Turner Broadcasting System, the service has made available exclusive previews of the Cartoon Network's Adult Swim block including Robot Chicken, Mr. Pickles, China, IL, and Aqua Teen Hunger Force.

From 28 December 2016 TIMvision becomes a company controlled by Telecom Italia, with the aim of accelerating the Quadruple Play strategy and creating and managing productions including TV series and cinematographic works at a national and international level.

Since June 2019, TIMvision has also made its app available on the Apple TV and Amazon Fire TV platforms.

From 16 September 2019, Andrea Fabiano became the Multimedia manager of TIM (formerly Telecom Italia) and TIMvision CEO.

On 12 October 2019, during the match of the Italian national team for qualifying for the 2020 European Football Championships, the new logo was unveiled.

On 31 December 2019, Sky Uno, Sky Arte, Sky TG24 and Sky Sport 24 in HD are made visible in streaming. Furthermore, the Mediaset channels, excluding Boing, Cartoonito and the radio ones also arrive.

From 24 March 2020, TIM after signing a partnership with Disney+, TIM includes the Mundo Disney+ offer without constraints with TIMvision Plus.

From 27 May 2020, following the partnership with Netflix made in November 2019, TIM includes the Mundo Netflix offer on TIMvision Plus and the TIMvision Box decoder.

In August 2020 the free channels Paramount Network, Spike, VH1 published by ViacomCBS Networks Italia were made available in streaming and in HD.

From 27 January 2021, the contents of Discovery+ are also available in Italy on TIMvision.

On 1 July 2021, the four commercial offers are made official, which include the contents of TIMvision and those of DAZN, Disney+ and Netflix, with Infinity+ always included in the various packages. Following the partnership with DAZN, holder of the transmission rights all 380 seasonal matches of the Serie A championship for the three-year period 2021-2024, TIMvision hosts all the races of the maximum Italian football championship on its platform. Thanks to the TIMvision Calcio and Sport offer, the Europa League, some races of the new Conference League, Serie B, La Liga, MotoGP and all the sporting events of the DAZN offer are also visible through DAZN.

Until 31 July 2021, it included the possibility, through a NOW TV subscription, of watching Serie A, Premier League and Bundesliga football matches, as well as Formula 1 and all the sporting events contained in the Sky sports package.

Since August 2021, with the agreement with Mediaset Infinity and the streaming broadcast on the Infinity+ platform, it has been offering the matches of the 2022 UEFA Champions League for a total of 92 first phase matches, including 8 from the playoffs and 84 of the groups.

With to the partnership with Mediaset Infinity and thanks to the use of the Infinity+ platform, the offer of films, cartoons, TV series and content available also in the original language, with subtitles and in 4K, previously included in the Infinity TV catalog, is expanded.

On 17 January 2022, the Paramount Network and Spike channels, edited by ViacomCBS Networks Italia, were eliminated following their closure. A few days later of Paramount Network's replacement, 27 Twentyseven, published by Mediaset, was made available.

On 29 March 2022, La7 and La7d were placed on the platform.

On 1 October 2025, La7d was replaced by La7 Cinema, and on 5 October, Warner TV was replaced by Discovery.

== Device support ==
The devices featured in this list feature hardware that is compatible for streaming TIMvision:

- Android smartphones and tablets
- Android TV devices
- Apple: iPad, iPhone
- Microsoft: Windows 8, Windows 10, Windows 11
- Sony: some Blu-ray Disc players, CTVs
- LG: some Blu-ray Disc players, CTVs
- Samsung: some Blu-ray Disc players, CTVs

== Logos ==
12 May 2014 – 22 June 2017

22 June 2017 – 12 October 2019

12 October 2019 – 16 July 2026

In use since 16 July 2026
