= Joi (TV channel) =

- Country: Italy
- Broadcast area: Italy

Programming
- Language: Italian
- Picture format: 4:3/16:9 SDTV
- Timeshift service: Joi +1

Ownership
- Owner: Mediaset

History
- Launched: 18 January 2008
- Closed: 1 July 2019

Links
- Website: mediasetpremium.mediaset.it/canale/index_joi.shtml

Joi was an Italian Entertainment TV channel, owned by Mediaset and broadcast on Premium Gallery, a digital terrestrial television service in Italy. It was devoted to family entertainment and broadcast movies and TV series.

== History ==
Joi and Joi +1 began broadcasting on 19 January 2008 at 1.30pm, as part of Mediaset Premium's conversion into a full pay-TV service and the creation of the Premium Gallery package.

On 21 September 2010, coinciding with the launch of The Event, the channel underwent a graphics restyling.

On 1 July 2011 Joi +1 (together with Steel +1 and Mya +1) ceased broadcasting.

On 1 January 2013 the channel renewed itself, moving towards an editorial line dedicated to entertainment and airing many TV series previously broadcast on Mya or Steel.

On 1 March 2016, a new timeshift version of the channel, Joi +24, was activated on channel 316 which broadcast the previous day's deferred programming. This version ceased broadcasting on 19 April 2018.

On 1 June 2018 the channel also lands on Infinity, and on 4 June it lands on Sky in HD.

After the closure of Mediaset Premium on 1 June 2019, the channel continues to broadcast on Infinity and Sky.

However, on 17 June 2019, it was announced the channel would cease broadcasting on 1 July. Part of its programming was transferred to Premium Stories.

== See also ==
- Mediaset Premium
