= Premium Action =

Italian pay television channel

- Country: Italy
- Broadcast area: Italy

Programming
- Language(s): Italian

Ownership
- Owner: Mediaset
- Parent: Mediaset
- Sister channels: Premium Crime; Premium Stories

History
- Launched: 1 April 2013; 12 years ago
- Replaced: Steel
- Closed: 10 January 2022; 3 years ago

Premium Action was an Italian pay television channel owned by Mediaset through his pay Mediaset Premium offer.

It shut down on 10 January 2022.

== History ==
The channel was originally born as Steel on the Mediaset Premium platform, owned by NBCUniversal collaborating with Mediaset. Premium Action was born following a reorganization of the platform, in which Mediaset assumes the control and inherits the content broadcast and aiming for more action films and series, aimed at a 20-45 male demographic, the same as the former channel, and without NBCUniversal's support. The channel began broadcast on 1 April 2013 with the special Ultra. Premium Stories

On 23 June 2015, following changes to the platform, the HD version and the +24 timeshift started, and the SD version was closed. On 19 April 2018, the channel continues broadcasting in SD.

On 1 June 2018, the +24 version was closed and moves to channels 316 and 460.

Since 1 June 2018, the channel is available on Infinity in the section "Live Channels".

Since 4 June 2018, the channel is available on Sky on channel 125.

Since April 2019, the channel is available on Sky Go.

Since 1 June 2019, following the closure of Mediaset Premium, the channel continues its broadcast on Infinity and Sky.

Since 1 April 2021, the channel is available also in HD on Sky Go.

Since 8 April 2021, following the merger of Infinity and Mediaset Play, the channel is available on Infinity+.

On 10 January 2022, the channel, along with other Mediaset pay channels, end its broadcast.

== Programming ==
=== Final Programming ===
- The 100
- Arrow
- The Brave
- Childhood's End
- Gotham
- The Last Kingdom
- Mr. Robot
- Supergirl
- Supernatural
- The Vampire Diaries

=== Former Programming ===
- 666 Park Avenue
- Agent X
- American Odyssey
- Alcatraz
- Almost Human
- Batwoman
- Believe
- Blood Drive
- Breakout Kings
- Chicago Fire
- Chuck
- Constantine
- Covert Affairs
- Cult
- Do No Harm
- The Flash
- Fringe
- Grimm
- Heroes
- Heroes Reborn
- iZombie
- Krypton
- Legends of Tomorrow
- Lucifer
- Moonlight
- Nikita
- The Originals
- Orphan Black
- Rescue: Special Ops
- Revolution
- Smallvile
- Spooks
- Terminator: The Sarah Connor Chronicles
- The Tomorrow People
- Transporter: The Series
- Undercover
- V (2009 TV series)
- Veritas: The Quest
