= 2008 in Italian television =

This is a list of Italian television related events from 2008.

== Events ==
- 10 March – Launch of the Italian version of The X Factor.
- 21 April – Mario Ferretti wins the eighth season of Grande Fratello.
- 27 May – Aram Quartet win the first season of X Factor.

== Debuts ==
- 10 March – X Factor (2008–present)

== Television shows ==
=== Drama ===
- Coco Chanel – biopic by Christian Duguay, with Barbora Bobulova and Shirley McLaine in the title role, respectively as a young woman and an aged one; 2 episodes. Coproduced with France and United States.

=== Serials ===
- PsicoVip – by Bruno Bozzetto, cartoon in 3D animation, spin-off of the movie VIP my brother Superman.

=== 2000s ===
- Grande Fratello (2000–present)
- Ballando con le stelle (2005–present)

== Networks and services ==
=== Launches ===
Network	Type	Launch date	Notes	Source
Joi	Cable and satellite	18 January		
Mya	Cable and satellite	18 January		
Steel	Cable and satellite	19 January		
Sky Sport 24	Cable and satellite	30 August		
DeA Kids	Cable and satellite	1 October		
Hip Hop TV	Cable and satellite	1 October		
SuperTennis	Cable and satellite	10 November		
Mediaset Plus	Cable and satellite	1 December		

=== Closures ===
Network	Type	Closure date	Notes	Source
GAY.tv	Cable and satellite	18 December		

== See also ==
- List of Italian films of 2008
