= List of programmes broadcast by Mya =

This is a list of television programs broadcast by Mya in Italy.

== Television series ==
=== Final series ===
- Chante!
- Dallas
- Eva Luna
- Gilmore Girls
- Gossip Girl
- Hemlock Grove
- The New Adventures of Old Christine
- Nip/Tuck
- The Originals
- Parenthood
- Pretty Little Liars
- Smash
- The Vampire Diaries
- Vivir a destiempo
- X-Style

=== Former series ===
- 2 Broke Girls
- Ally McBeal
- American Dreams
- Better with You
- The Bold and the Beautiful
- Boston Legal
- The Closer
- Dharma & Greg
- Falcon Beach
- Friends
- Grey's Anatomy
- Hart of Dixie
- Men in Trees
- Mercy
- The Nanny
- One Tree Hill
- Privileged
- Rizzoli & Isles
- Saving Grace
- The Secret Circle
- Shameless
- Skins
- The Starter Wife
- Sturm der Liebe
- Tru Calling
- The Tudors
- United States of Tara
- Veronica Mars
- What I Like About You
