= 2008 in television =

2008 in television may refer to:

- 2008 in American television for television-related events in the United States.
- 2008 in Australian television for television-related events in Australia.
- 2008 in Belgian television for television-related events in Belgium.
- 2008 in Brazilian television for television-related events in Brazil.
- 2008 in British television for television-related events in the United Kingdom.
  - 2008 in Scottish television for television-related events in Scotland.
- 2008 in Canadian television for television-related events in Canada.
- 2008 in Croatian television for television-related events in Croatia.
- 2008 in Danish television for television-related events in Denmark.
- 2008 in Dutch television for television-related events in the Netherlands.
- 2008 in Estonian television for television-related events in Estonia.
- 2008 in French television for television-related events in France.
- 2008 in German television for television-related events in Germany.
- 2008 in Irish television for television-related events in the Republic of Ireland.
- 2008 in Italian television for television-related events in Italy.
- 2008 in Japanese television for television-related events in Japan.
- 2008 in New Zealand television for television-related events in New Zealand.
- 2008 in Norwegian television for television-related events in Norway.
- 2008 in Pakistani television for television-related events in Pakistan.
- 2008 in Philippine television for television-related events in the Philippines.
- 2008 in Polish television for television-related events in Poland.
- 2008 in Portuguese television for television-related events in Portugal.
- 2008 in South African television for television-related events in South Africa.
- 2008 in Spanish television for television-related events in Spain.
- 2008 in Swedish television for television-related events in Sweden.
