= Infinity+ =

Infinity+ may refer to:

- Infinity+ (Italy), an Italian video streaming service
- Infinity+ (Spain), a Spanish video streaming service
