= Better with You =

American television sitcom

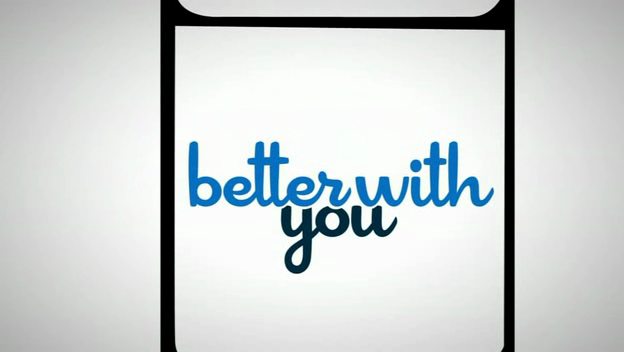
- Genre: Sitcom; Romantic comedy
- Created by: Shana Goldberg-Meehan
- Starring: JoAnna Garcia Swisher; Jennifer Finnigan; Josh Cooke; Jake Lacy; Kurt Fuller; Debra Jo Rupp
- Opening theme: "Better with You" by Ben Kweller
- Country of origin: United States
- Original language: English
- No. of seasons: 1
- No. of episodes: 22

Production
- Executive producers: Shana Goldberg-Meehan; Greg Malins
- Camera setup: Multi-camera
- Running time: 30 minutes
- Production companies: Silver and Gold Productions; Bonanza Productions; Warner Bros. Television

Original release
- Network: ABC
- Release: September 22, 2010 – May 11, 2011

Better with You is an American television sitcom created by Shana Goldberg-Meehan that aired on ABC from September 22, 2010, to May 11, 2011. It stars JoAnna Garcia Swisher, Jennifer Finnigan, Josh Cooke, Jake Lacy, Kurt Fuller, and Debra Jo Rupp.

On May 13, 2011, ABC cancelled the series after one season two days after the series finale aired.

== Plot ==
The series revolved around three different relationships that are tightly intertwined in one family, as it follows a couple, Maddie and Ben, who had been dating for nine years and are happy just living together despite not taking the next step, marriage. Maddie's life is thrown for a loop when her younger sister Mia announces that she is pregnant and is about to marry Casey, a guy whom she has only known for seven weeks. To make matters worse, Maddie is stunned that their parents, who have been married for 35 years and have their issues, approve of the union, leaving Maddie and Ben questioning themselves about their own relationship. The story followed their lives and struggles.

== Cast ==
- JoAnna Garcia Swisher as Mia Putney, Maddie's younger sister and Casey's fiancée
- Jennifer Finnigan as Madeleine "Maddie" Putney, Mia's older sister and Ben's girlfriend
- Josh Cooke as Ben Coles, Maddie's boyfriend
- Jake Lacy as Casey Marion Davenport, Mia's fiancé
- Kurt Fuller as Joel Putney, Vicky's husband and Maddie and Mia's father
- Debra Jo Rupp as Vicky Putney, Joel's wife and Maddie and Mia's mother

== Production ==
Better with You was previously known as Better Together, Couples, Leapfrog, and then briefly as That Couple. On January 15, 2010, ABC green-lit the pilot, which was written by Friends writer and executive producer Shana Goldberg-Meehan and directed by James Burrows. The show was produced by Bonanza Productions, Silver and Gold Productions, and Warner Bros. Television. Better with You aired on Wednesday at 8:30 after The Middle and before Modern Family. On October 26, ABC announced that Better with You was picked up for a full 22-episode season.

Ben Kweller wrote the theme song for the show. Country music singer Reba McEntire made an appearance in episode 8, "Better with Flirting", as wedding planner Lorraine Ashley. Series regular Joanna Garcia Swisher and McEntire both starred in the WB/CW series Reba.

Better with You marked the second time Josh Cooke and Jennifer Finnigan have co-starred on a sitcom, the first being the short-lived 2005 NBC series Committed; it is also the second time that Cooke and Kurt Fuller co-starred in a sitcom, having previously starred in the short-lived 2006 ABC series Big Day.

== Episodes ==
All episodes of the show (except "Pilot") start with the word "Better".

No.	Title	Directed by	Written by	Original release date	Prod. code	U.S. viewers (millions)
1	"Pilot"	James Burrows	Shana Goldberg-Meehan	September 22, 2010	296777	7.97
Mia invites her sister Maddie and her boyfriend Ben to meet her new boyfriend Casey and to let them know that they are engaged. Maddie is very surprised by the news and gets jealous that her little sister is getting married before her. Maddie tries to be supportive of her little sister and let her parents Vicky and Joel be the critical ones, but, to Maddie's surprise, their parents are very supportive of Mia's quick engagement. Only for things to get even worse when Maddie finds out that Ben knows that Mia is also pregnant and that she wasn't told.
2	"Better with Firehouse"	John Pasquin	Lon Zimmet & Dan Rubin	September 29, 2010	2J5805	6.99
Mia and Casey go house hunting when they realize that their apartment will be too small when the baby arrives. But Casey has unusual tastes when it come to home selection and wants a dilapidated old firehouse to be their new home. Maddie tells Mia just to go along with the choice because, before a man turns 27, he never really knows what he wants anyway. Meanwhile, now that Joel has finally retired, the already retired Vickey finds that Joel is really getting on her nerves because he doesn't know what to do with his new, free time.
3	"Better with Ben"	Andy Cadiff	Kat Likkel & John Hoberg	October 6, 2010	2J5804	6.87
Everybody hates the Christmas photo card that Joel obsesses over every year. But, when Ben is left out of the card, he gets really hurt when Joel invites Casey instead, so he and Maddie devise a revenge Christmas card. Meanwhile, Mia and Casey are finding it hard to say "no", so they ask Maddie and Ben to do the hard work for their future baby.
4	"Better with Fighting"	Andy Cadiff	Shana Goldberg-Meehan	October 13, 2010	2J5802	6.38
When Casey and Mia have their very first fight as an engaged couple, Casey implements his own plan to stop the arguments. In an attempt to help them, Maddie decides to show them how arguing can actually be healthy for a relationship, but instead, she ends up exposing a fault in her own nine-year relationship with Ben. Meanwhile, Vicky and Joel quietly resolve their arguments by hiding each others things.
5	"Better with Little Buddy"	Andy Cadiff	Greg Malins	October 20, 2010	2J5806	6.83
Maddie thinks that the best way to get someone to do something is to make them think that it was all their idea. So she makes a deal with Ben to see if he can make Vicky stop sending frivolous emails to his workplace. Meanwhile, after her ultrasound, Mia finds it very difficult to convince Casey that their romantic activities won't harm the baby, so Maddie suggests that Mia try to find a way to make Casey see her as the sexy woman he fell in love with.
6	"Better with Halloween"	John Pasquin	Mathew Harawitz	October 27, 2010	2J5807	7.67
It's Halloween, which is also the date of Maddie's birthday. Because Maddie feels like she can never really celebrate her own birthday, since the holiday steals the spotlight, Mia and Casey offer to throw her a birthday party at their new house, the renovated firehouse. Ben, however, wasn't listening to Maddie when she told him what she wanted for a birthday present, so Joel tells him whatever he does when he messes things up. Meanwhile, Maddie and Vicky warn Mia that when couples live together they should never look behind each others "curtain," just in case they learn things they shouldn't know about each other.
7	"Better with Road Joel"	Shelley Jensen	Zachary Rosenblatt	November 3, 2010	2J5808	7.73
Joel and Ben decide to accompany Casey on a road trip to Vermont, so he can move stuff out of his storage. Ben sees the trip as an opportunity to bond with Casey; But Joel sees this trip as a way to go far off his salt free diet. Meanwhile, Mia, Vicky, and Maddie start organizing Mia's baby shower, and Casey's hard-to-please mother, Ariel, comes for a visit. Mia goes out of her way to be accepted by Ariel, but things get heated between Vicky and Ariel when they both want the baby to call them "Nana."
8	"Better with Flirting"	Shelley Jensen	Greg Malins	November 17, 2010	2J5811	7.11
Mia and Casey are over the moon when Maddie scores them a meeting with Lorraine Ashley, one of the top wedding planners in the city. However, suddenly everything takes a turn for the worse, when it seems as though Lorraine is trying to upstage their wedding. Meanwhile, Ben feels as though he has lost his flirting skills since he met and started dating Maddie. Reba McEntire (formerly JoAnna Garcia's mother on Reba) guest stars.
9	"Better with Thanksgiving"	Gary Halvorson	Adam Chase	November 24, 2010	2J5809	6.85
It's Thanksgiving and everyone but Vicky is relieved when her oven breaks down, as for once, everyone can enjoy a regular Thanksgiving feast, instead of enduring some horrible concoction that Vicky made up on the brim. Meanwhile, while everyone is spending Thanksgiving at Maddie and Ben's apartment, Mia stumbles across her late grandmother's "stolen" ring, hidden in a closet.
10	"Better with Christmas Crap"	Gary Halvorson	Margee Magee & Angeli Millan	December 8, 2010	2J5810	7.15
Maddie and Mia know that if they don't attend a family Christmas dinner with their parents at the lake house, Vicky and Joel will just pile the guilt on them, so Mia and Casey try to use the excuse that she is pregnant but as Maddie finds out, she tries to make up an excuse so that she and Ben won't have to go either.
11	"Better with Skinny Jeans"	Rob Schiller	Kat Likkel & John Hoberg	January 5, 2011	2J5813	7.44
Mia accuses Ben of destroying a pair of her jeans, so she takes him to buy her another pair, but he must break the news that she has to start wearing pregnancy pants. Meanwhile, Joel reads Vicky and her girlfriends' fantasy husband draft website and when he sees he is ranked last, he tries to get back into shape and Maddie tries to impress Casey with her high regard for the U.S. Postal Service.
12	"Better with a Cat"	Shelley Jensen	Christopher Luccy	January 19, 2011	2J5812	6.37
When Mia and Casey adopt a stray cat, their pediatrician tells them that it's not a good idea for them to have a pet around the baby. So Maddie & Ben and Vicky & Joel all enter a competition under the impression that if one of them takes in the cat, then Mia and Casey will make them their baby's guardians.
13	"Better with Valentine's Day"	Gary Halvorson	Greg Malins & Shana Goldberg-Meehan	February 9, 2011	2J5816	6.80
Casey makes some big plans for his and Mia's first Valentine's Day and is warned by Ben and Joel to never buy an expensive gift because then every gift afterward would have to be just as costly. Still, Casey goes through with his plans anyway, which makes Ben realize he wants to show Maddie how he feels, and when Joel finds out, he hires the singer/pianist Michael Feinstein to perform. Note: From this episode onwards, JoAnna Garcia is billed as JoAnna Garcia Swisher.
14	"Better with a Leather Jacket"	Gary Halvorson	Eve Weston & Dan Holden	February 16, 2011	2J5815	5.86
Casey has a job interview and without telling anyone, he borrows a leather jacket that gives bad luck to anyone who wears it. Everyone then recalls all their bad experiences while wearing the jacket, and even Ben, who once dropped a blanket on the New York Yankee Nick Swisher when he was about to catch a fly ball.
15	"Better with a Shamrock"	Gary Halvorson	Lon Zimmet & Dan Rubin	February 23, 2011	2J5817	5.73
Ben wants to have his name posted on a shamrock on the wall of his favorite bar, but is disappointed to learn that it may not happen because the bar is owned by the New York Yankee Nick Swisher, making Ben hope that he doesn't remember the time he dropped a blanket on him while he was trying to catch a fly ball during a baseball game. Meanwhile, Mia and Maddie try to avoid accompanying Vicky to a charity event.
16	"Better Without a Couch"	Andrew Weyman	Story by : Lon Zimmet & Dan Rubin; Teleplay by : Zachary Rosenblatt	March 2, 2011	2J5814	5.66
When Casey finds out that one of his ex-girlfriends wants her couch back, the one he and Mia are currently using, Ben decides to help him get rid of it without Mia ever finding out the real reason for them losing it. Meanwhile, when Maddie updates her parents wills, she finds out that they don't take her professional efforts seriously. (Originally scheduled to air on January 12, 2011; preempted due to coverage of the 2011 Tucson shooting memorial service.)
17	"Better Without a Job"	Gary Halvorson	Shana Goldberg-Meehan & Greg Malins	April 13, 2011	2J5820	4.85
After Maddie is told that she has been promoted to a partner at her firm, she is fired and, to save some face, she lies to her family, telling them that she quit because she was offered a better job. Meanwhile, Vicky decides to give Mia and Casey a children's book that has been passed through her family for generations.
18	"Better with Lying"	Andy Cadiff	Greg Malins	April 20, 2011	2J5803	5.25
On the day before Mia and Casey's engagement party, Maddie has a hard time believing Mia's story of how she met Casey, while Mia starts to doubt Maddie's story of how she meet Ben when they were building houses for the less fortunate. Meanwhile, during the engagement party, Vicky and Joel realize they can save some money by promoting Joel's campaign for becoming the club's treasurer.
19	"Better with Dancing"	Gary Halvorson	Story by : Eve Weston; Teleplay by : Christopher Luccy	April 25, 2011	2J5818	11.23
While taking dance classes for their wedding, Casey realizes that Mia isn't a good dancer so he decides to pretend that he is a bad dancer to make her look better. Meanwhile, Ben runs into Larry King while at a hotel and seizes the opportunity to ask him on advice about a fight he had with Maddie over her parents.
20	"Better with Crying"	Gary Halvorson	Mathew Harawitz	April 27, 2011	2J5819	4.65
When Mia realizes that she won't be able to be in her wedding party due to her pregnancy, she and Casey decide it would be best to postpone the wedding, but then Mia runs into trouble when the bridal shop won't refund her money for her wedding dress. Meanwhile, Joel tries to hold back from crying with his toast, so Ben uses the opportunity to make Joel cry as revenge for Joel making fun of him when he cried over his childhood pet dying.
21	"Better with a Bargain"	Gary Halvorson	Margee Magee & Angeli Millan	May 4, 2011	2J5821	5.41
Joel decides to use his old bargaining skills to try to buy Mia a high end baby stroller that shes really wants. Meanwhile, Maddie is worried that she has lost her passion for being a lawyer now that she is unemployed.
22	"Better with the Baby"	Gary Halvorson	Story by : Adam Chase; Teleplay by : Zachary Rosenblatt & Greg Malins	May 11, 2011	2J5822	5.95
When Mia goes into labor, she and Casey decide that they should be married before she gives birth, so Casey and Ben rush to City Hall to get the marriage license, while Maddie tries to find someone to perform the ceremony and Vicky and Joel look in the gift shop for the "something old, something new, something borrowed, something blue" items. The baby's name is Spencer.

== International broadcasts ==
Country	Network	Start date
Latin America	Warner Channel	November 1, 2010
New Zealand	TV2	January 19, 2011
Czech Republic	HBO Comedy	March 1, 2011
Poland	HBO Comedy	March 1, 2011
Romania	HBO Comedy	March 1, 2011
Serbia	HBO Comedy	March 1, 2011
Spain	TNT	March 1, 2011
United Kingdom	5*	March 9, 2011
France	OCS Happy	April 20, 2011
Italy	Mya, Joi, Canale 5	July 25, 2011
Australia	Nine Network	September 19, 2011
India	Zee Café	October 2011
Portugal	Fox Life	October 2, 2011
Croatia	Doma TV	March 5, 2012
Iceland	Stöð 2	March, 2012
Brazil	SBT	August 14, 2012
Bulgaria	bTV	April 6, 2013
Israel	HOT 3	
Philippines	2nd Avenue/(RJTV)	
Turkey	CNBC-E	
(Republic of Ireland) Ireland	3e	

== Reception ==
=== Critical reception ===
Better with You received generally positive reviews. It has a Metacritic score of 64 out of 100, based on reviews from 21 critics.

=== Ratings ===
Season	Episodes	Timeslot (EDT)	Original airing			Rank	Viewers (in millions)	Network
Season	Episodes	Timeslot (EDT)	Season premiere	Season finale	TV Season	Rank	Viewers (in millions)	Network
1	22	Wednesday 8:30 pm (September 22, 2010 – May 11, 2011) Monday 9:30 pm (April 25, 2011)	September 22, 2010	May 11, 2011	2010–2011	#75	6.60	ABC

=== Awards and nominations ===
Year	Presenter	Award	Result
2011	People's Choice Awards	Favorite New TV Comedy	Nominated
