= Everything Calls for Salvation =

Italian drama television series

- Netflix poster
- Italian: Tutto chiede salvezza
- Genre: Drama
- Based on: Everything Calls for Salvation by Daniele Mencarelli
- Written by: Francesco Bruni; Francesco Cenni; Daniela Gambaro; Daniele Mencarelli
- Directed by: Francesco Bruni
- Starring: Federico Cesari; Fotinì Peluso; Andrea Pennacchi; Vincenzo Crea; Vincenzo Nemolato; Lorenzo Renzi
- Composer: Lorenzo Tomio
- Country of origin: Italy
- Original language: Italian
- No. of seasons: 2
- No. of episodes: 12

Production
- Executive producers: Linda Vianello; Chiara Grassi
- Producer: Roberto Sessa
- Cinematography: Carlo Rinaldi
- Editors: Alessandro Heffler; Luca Carrera
- Running time: 42–51 minutes
- Production company: Picomedia

Original release
- Network: Netflix
- Release: 14 October 2022 – 26 September 2024

Everything Calls for Salvation (Italian: Tutto chiede salvezza) is an Italian drama television series based on the novel of the same name by Daniele Mencarelli. The first season was released on Netflix on 14 October 2022.

== Premise ==
A young man wakes up in a psychiatric ward, having been involuntarily committed by his family. The series follows his week in the hospital.

== Cast ==
=== Main ===
- Federico Cesari as Daniele Cenni (seasons 1–2)
- Fotinì Peluso as Nina Marinelli (seasons 1–2)
- Andrea Pennacchi as Mario (seasons 1–2)
- Vincenzo Crea as Gianluca (seasons 1–2)
- Vincenzo Nemolato as Madonnina (seasons 1–2)
- Lorenzo Renzi as Giorgio (seasons 1–2)
- Alessandro Pacioni as Alessandro (seasons 1–2)
- Ricky Memphis as Pino (seasons 1–2)
- Filippo Nigro as Doctor Mancino (seasons 1–2)
- Raffaella Lebboroni as Doctor Cimaroli (seasons 1–2)
- Bianca Nappi as Rossana (seasons 1–2)
- Flaure B.B. Kabore as Alessia (seasons 1–2)
- Lorenza Indovina as Anna (seasons 1–2)
- Arianna Mattioli as Antonella (seasons 1–2)
- Michele La Ginestra as Angelo (seasons 1–2)
- Massimo Bonetti (season 1)
- Carolina Crescentini as Giorgia (seasons 1–2)

=== Recurring ===
- Giacomo Mattia as Giovanni (seasons 1–2)
- Alessandro Averone as Ludovico (season 1)
- Marco Valerio Bartocci as Giuseppe (season 1)
- Niccolò Ferrero as Damiano (season 1)
- Darix Folco as Luigi (season 1)
- Gabriele Berti as Marcello (season 1)
- Drusilla Foer as Matilde (season 2)
- Valentina Romani as Angelica (season 2)
- Vittorio Viviani as Armando (season 2)
- Samuel Di Napoli as Rachid (season 2)
- Marco Todisco as Paolo (season 2)

== Episodes ==
=== Series overview ===
Series	Episodes	Originally released
1	7	14 October 2022
2	5	26 September 2024

=== Season 1 ===
No. overall	No. in season	Title	Duration	Original release date
1	1	"Sunday" (Domenica)	45 min	14 October 2022
After a night of partying, Daniele wakes up in a psychiatric hospital, not remembering how he arrived there. A doctor tells him he is confined to the hospital for a week of involuntary psychiatric treatment. He meets his roommates: Gianluca, a flamboyant gay man with bipolar disorder; Mario, a kindhearted retired elementary school teacher; Alessandro, who remains in a vegetative state and is frequently visited by his father; and Madonnina, a nonverbal man of whom nothing is known. Daniele calls his parents, but they ignore him. His brother visits and threatens to hurt him if he hurts their parents ever again, but Daniele insists he doesn't remember what happened. As Daniele attempts to escape in the middle of the night, he sees a young woman being wheeled into the hospital on a stretcher. He recognises her as Nina Marinelli, a famous actress with whom he went to high school.
2	2	"Monday" (Lunedì)	45 min	14 October 2022
The men get a new roommate, Giorgio, who is sedated and being committed for the fourth time. Giorgio wakes up from his sedation and startles Daniele, but it is soon revealed that Giorgio is a gentle giant. A doctor prescribes Daniele SSRIs and recommends he take up writing. Daniele wanders into the women's ward and sees Nina. He calls her over and asks if she remembers him from high school, but she irritably claims that her name isn't Nina and that she didn't attend his high school. Daniele's mother finally calls and tells him that he hurt his father and berated them both during his psychotic break, which makes Daniele cry. He lashes out at his roommates after Giorgio tells a story about his mother, who passed away in his childhood. Later, Daniele catches Nina trying to escape out of a window, much to her annoyance. That night, Daniele begins to bond with Mario.
3	3	"Tuesday" (Martedì)	46 min	14 October 2022
Daniele apologises to his roommates for his outburst the previous night. He asks a nurse why Mario is in the facility, and the nurse tells him that Mario was tried for attempted murder of his wife and daughter. Daniele tells Mario that he knows about his attempted murder charges. Mario tells him that his depression forced him to retire and that he couldn't cope with not being able to provide for his family. Daniele's father visits him in the hospital. It is revealed that Daniele's parents could only afford to send one of their children to university, so they chose Daniele, believing him to be the most sensible. Daniele, however, dropped out during his first year. He tells his father that he'll consider re-enrolling. Nina receives a visit from an older man, Ludovico, who had been cheating on his wife with her. Nina finds Daniele and tells him that she remembers him as a loser in high school. She threatens to hurt him if he tells any of their schoolmates about her admission to the facility.
4	4	"Wednesday" (Mercoledì)	49 min	14 October 2022
Gianluca's father, a stoic general, visits the hospital to give Gianluca clean clothes. Gianluca's father is dismissive and visibly irritated by his son's presence, while the typically-energetic Gianluca turns meek and timid at the sight of his father. While wandering around the women's ward, Daniele sees Nina's mother and tells her that he knows Nina from high school. Nina's mother chides Daniele, telling him that Nina has a career and a future and doesn't belong in the facility among the lost causes, Daniele included. Privately, Nina's mother tells Nina to reconcile with Ludovico, as she wouldn't have a career without him. Nina chastises her mother for controlling her life and tells her that she can't go forward with her career. Madonnina, who stole a lighter from a nurse, sneaks out of the room and sets a storeroom on fire. After the fire is contained, the staff take the residents to a park for fresh air. Nina and Daniele grow closer at the park, and she kisses him after they take a walk together. The roommates tell Madonnina that they're not angry about the fire, and they bond before bed.
5	5	"Thursday" (Giovedì)	49 min	14 October 2022
Daniele asks Mario for some sleeping pills to give the on-duty nurse so he can sneak out and watch fireworks with Nina, and Mario obliges. Mario tells Daniele that he craves tidiness and order to maintain some consistency in his life after the incident with his family. He tells Daniele that the only certainty in his life is a bird that sits in a nest outside his window. After giving the nurse a cup of tea with crushed-up sleeping pills mixed in, Daniele sneaks out and goes up to the roof of the hospital with Nina. They have sex as the fireworks start. Mario tells the roommates that Daniele snuck out with Nina, and Gianluca wakes up the nurse out of jealousy. The nurse finds them and drags Daniele back to his room, telling him that he'll be punished with another week in the hospital. Nina, meanwhile, manages to escape the hospital and run away. She makes her way to the beach, strips naked, and walks into the water.
6	6	"Friday" (Venerdì)	42 min	14 October 2022
Nina returns to the hospital as morning breaks. A doctor harshly reprimands Daniele, telling him that his punishment is another week of involuntary commitment. Gianluca is sad because it is his last day in the hospital, and the hospital is the only place where everyone accepts him for who he is. He later convinces the staff to let him stay another day, much to his elation. The bird returns, and Mario sits on the windowsill to feed it, but he accidentally falls out of the window. The roommates are devastated by this. Daniele goes to Nina, who tells him that she had escaped the previous night. Daniele is furious; he was reprimanded and punished because the staff thought he helped Nina escape. To make matters worse, Nina doesn't have to stay the extra week because of her connections. A doctor tells the roommates that Mario is being hospitalised for his injuries. Giorgio asks the doctor if the roommates can see Mario, but when the doctor refuses, Giorgio has a violent outburst. He fights several nurses, all while having flashbacks to being unable to see his dying mother when he was a child. Gianluca, feeling guilty, tells Daniele that he was the one who woke up the nurse, but Daniele forgives him.
7	7	"Saturday" (Sabato)	45 min	14 October 2022
Gianluca says goodbye to the roommates. As he leaves with his father, Daniele chases after them. He tells Gianluca's father that Gianluca is an amazing person who kept everyone's spirits high. Before they leave, Daniele kisses Gianluca passionately, much to the annoyance of Gianluca's father. A doctor tells Daniele that Mario didn't make it and passed away that morning. Daniele is devastated and asks about Giorgio, who the doctor says has been hospitalised at a prison in Velletri. The staff have decided to discharge Daniele as they don't believe he deserves the extra week of punishment. He goes to say goodbye to Nina. She asks why he doesn't seem to be happy, and he tells her that Mario died. They reconcile, and Daniele gives her his phone number. Before Daniele leaves, a nurse gives him a book of Arthur Rimbaud poetry that Mario had asked her to buy for Daniele. Daniele's mother picks him up from the hospital. Nina watches from a window and cries as they drive off. Daniele goes out to lunch with his family as Nina angrily texts him about not responding to her. He tells her that he'll be at Mario's funeral that day if she wants to meet up. At the funeral, which is attended by Gianluca, Nina, and the hospital staff, Daniele tearfully reads a poem dedicated to Mario. After the funeral, Daniele asks Gianluca to hang out later. They go to a nightclub and see Nina. She tells him that she ran out of cocaine and asks if he has any extra. He takes her to a bathroom stall and berates her for her drug use. They get into a heated argument while a group of girls in the bathroom record the fight. Daniele angrily returns home and receives a text from Nina to go to her Instagram profile, where she posted a video admitting to her followers that she attempted suicide and was involuntarily committed. Some time later, Daniele and Nina are at a pool together, about to conquer their fears and jump off the high dive. Nina reveals that she might be pregnant from the night they had sex at the hospital. They hold hands at the top of the high dive, looking uneasy.

=== Season 2 ===
No. overall	No. in season	Title	Duration	Original release date
8	1	"Week One" (Prima settimana)	48 min	26 September 2024
9	2	"Week Two" (Seconda settimana)	49 min	26 September 2024
10	3	"Week Three" (Terza settimana)	49 min	26 September 2024
11	4	"Week Four" (Quarta settimana)	51 min	26 September 2024
12	5	"Week Five" (Quinta settimana)	49 min	26 September 2024

== Production ==
The series was announced by Netflix in May 2022, with the series' 14 October 2022 release date being announced in July of that year. Regarding the series, Netflix Vice President of Italian Originals Eleanora Andreatta stated that, "We want high entertaining stories that can also break taboos and challenge people ... We're trying to build our slate: adaptation of big IP, original stories and creating anti-hero narratives. Italy didn't have those stories before."

Filming took place over 14 weeks in Rome, Anzio, and Ostia. Although the novel was set during the 1994 FIFA World Cup, the series takes place in the present day.

== Release ==
The series was renewed for a second season in 2023. The second season was released on 26 September 2024.

== Reception ==
Joel Keller of Decider referred to the series as "a gentler, more optimistic take on One Flew Over The Cuckoo's Nest".

== Awards and nominations ==
Year	Award	Category	Nominee	Result	Ref.
2023	Ciak d'Oro Serie TV	Best Italian Series	Everything Calls for Salvation	Won	
2023	Ciak d'Oro Serie TV	Best Audience Series Under 30	Everything Calls for Salvation	Nominated	
2023	Ciak d'Oro Serie TV	Best Italian Actor	Andrea Pennacchi	Nominated	
2023	Ciak d'Oro Serie TV	Best Audience Actor Under 30	Federico Cesari	Nominated	
2023	Nastri d'Argento Grandi Serie	Best Series	Everything Calls for Salvation	Nominated	
2023	Nastri d'Argento Grandi Serie	Best Supporting Actor	Andrea Pennacchi	Won	
