= Premium Stories =

Italian pay television channel

- Country: Italy
- Broadcast area: Italy

Programming
- Language(s): Italian

Ownership
- Owner: Mediaset
- Parent: Mediaset
- Sister channels: Premium Crime; Premium Action

History
- Launched: 23 June 2015; 10 years ago
- Replaced: Mya
- Closed: 10 January 2022; 3 years ago

Premium Stories was an Italian pay television channel owned by Mediaset through his Mediaset Premium offer.

It shut down on 10 January 2022.

== History ==
The channel was launched on 23 June 2015, replacing Mya, which broadcast TV series, soap operas and films. Premium Stories maintained many programmes from his programming.

On 1 March 2016, the timeshift version Premium Stories +24 was launched on channel 318 which broadcasts the previous day's deferred programming.

On 4 September 2017, Premium Stories +24 is closes to be then replaced by Premium Calcio 2.

Since 1 June 2018, the channel is available on Mediaset Infinity in the section "Live Channels".

Since 4 June 2018, the channel is available on Sky on channel 122 in HD.

Since April 2019, the channel is available on Sky Go.

Since 1 June 2019, following Mediaset Premium's closure, the channel remained on Infinity and Sky.

Since 1 April 2021, the channel is available on Sky Go even in HD.

Since 8 April 2021, following Mediaset Play and Infinity's merge into the new platform Mediaset Infinity, the channel is available on Infinity+.

On 10 January 2022, Premium Stories, along with all the other Mediaset pay channels, ends its broadcast.

== Programming ==
=== Final Programming ===
Sources:

- All American
- American woman
- A. P. Bio
- Champions
- Famous in Love
- Girlfriends' Guide to Divorce
- Joey
- Katy Keene
- Pretty Little Liars: The Perfectionists
- Rise
- Superstore
- Two and a Half Men
- Will & Grace

=== Former Programming ===
- The 45 Rules of Divorce
- Allegiance
- The Big Bang Theory
- Bob Hearts Abishola
- The Bold Type
- Chante!
- Chasing Life
- Chicago Med
- Claws
- Covert Affairs
- The Detour
- Everwood
- Game of Silence
- The Goldbergs
- God Friended Me
- Gossip Girl
- Heartbeat
- Hostages
- Imposters
- Katy Keene
- Legacies
- Life Sentence
- Manifest
- Miami Medical
- The Middle
- Mom
- The Mysteries of Laura
- The Night Shift
- Nip/Tuck
- Orange is the New Black
- Rise
- Riverdale
- Roswell, New Mexico
- Royal Pains
- Satisfaction
- Shameless
- Spooks
- State of Affairs
- Suits
- Superstore
- X-Style
