= List of programmes broadcast by Joi =

This is a list of television programs broadcast by Joi in Italy.

== Programs ==
=== Final Shows ===
- The Big Bang Theory
- Chuck
- Gilmore Girls
- Me, Myself & I
- Splitting Up Together
- Trial & Error
- Two and a Half Men
- Will & Grace
- Young Sheldon

=== Former Shows ===
- Aliens in America
- Cold Case
- Da kommt Kalle
- ER
- Everwood
- Grandi Domani
- House
- I Cesaroni (Italian version of Los Serrano)
- Il Mammo
- L.A. Heat
- La Strana Coppia
- Law & Order: Criminal Intent
- Law & Order: Special Victims Unit
- Law & Order: Trial by Jury
- Life
- Malcolm in the Middle
- The Middle
- Monk
- The Nine
- Royal Pains
- Step by Step
- The War at Home
- The West Wing
