= Andrea Pennacchi =

Italian actor (born 1969)

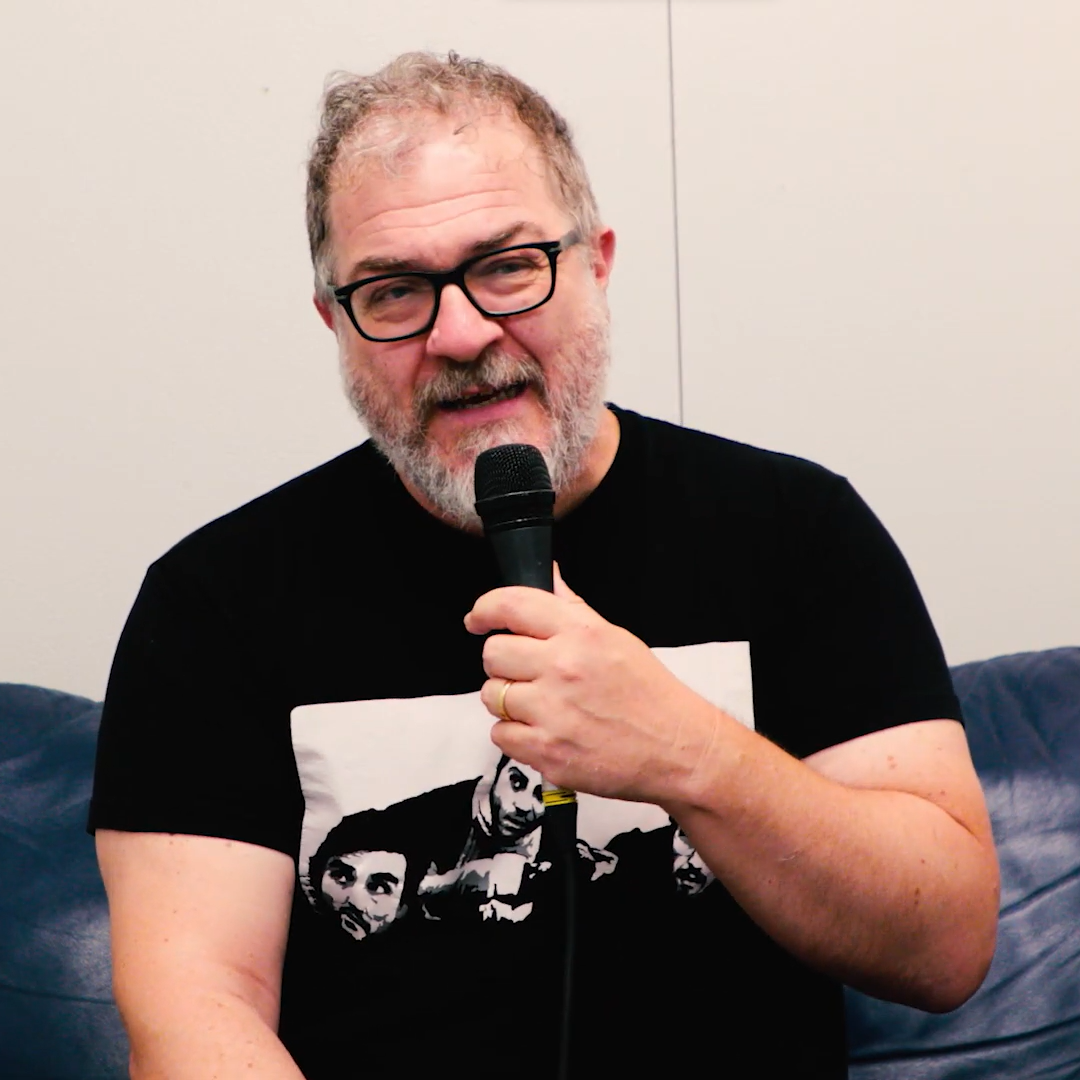
- Pennacchi in 2023
- Born: 11 October 1969 (age 56); Padua, Italy
- Education: University of Padua
- Occupations: Actor; playwright; theatre director; author
- Years active: 1993–present

Andrea Pennacchi (born 11 October 1969) is an Italian actor, playwright, theatre director, and author.

== Biography ==
Pennacchi was born in Padua. In his youth, he was a rugby player. He graduated with a degree in modern languages and literature at the University of Padua. He had also trained to be a pilot through the Italian Air Force.

While a university student, he took a theatre course and became interested in acting. He worked as an assistant to director Gigi Dall'Aglio and learned the fundamentals of directing and writing for theatre. He wrote and performed the shows Eroi in 2011 and Villan People in 2013.

In November 2024, he published a historical mystery novel, Se la rosa non avesse il suo nome.

== Filmography ==
=== Film ===
Year	Title	Role	Ref.
2007	The Right Distance	Notabile	
2011	Shun Li and the Poet	Sandro	
2013	First Snowfall	Commissioner	
2013	La sedia della felicità	Upholsterer	
2014	Fuori mira	Mauro Fontana	
2015	A Holy Venetian Family	Sorelli	
2015	Suburra	Mergio	
2017	Mom or Dad?	Police Officer #2	
2017	Resina	Hermann	
2017	Il colore nascosto delle cose	Paolo	
2018	Arrivano i prof	Preside	
2018	Lucia's Grace	Psychiatrist	
2018	Remember?	Father	
2019	The Man Without Gravity	Andrea	
2019	Paradise - Una nuova vita	Mair	
2020	The Beast	Mozart	
2020	Rose Island	Ulisse Rosa	
2021	Baggio: The Divine Ponytail	Florindo	
2021	Welcome Venice	Alvise	
2022	Run to You	Don Walter	
2022	Pluto	Franco Carling	
2023	My Paper Dolls	Primo	
2024	The Great Ambition	Luciano Barca	
2025	The Last One for the Road	Genio	
2025	Primavera	Governor	
TBA	Un eroe italiano		

=== Television ===
Year	Title	Role	Notes	Ref.
2015	L'Oriana	Direttore Europeo	Television film	
2015–2017	Il paradiso delle signore	Ezio Galli	39 episodes	
2017	Thou Shalt Not Kill	Maurizio Pagano	1 episode	
2018	Don Matteo	Daniele Mastropietro	1 episode	
2019	Il mondo sulle spalle	Mario	Television film	
2019	1994	Sindacalista	1 episode	
2020–2022	Petra	Antonio Monte	8 episodes	
2021	Vita da Carlo	Gustavo Signoretti	7 episodes	
2022	Circeo	Don Occelli	1 episode	
2022	Everything Calls for Salvation	Mario	7 episodes	
2022	La fortuna di Laura	Fabrizio Santini	Television film	
2023	Tina Anselmi - Una vita per la democrazia	Ferruccio	Television film	
2024	La Rosa dell'Istria	Antonio	Television film	
2025	Leopardi - Il poeta dell'infinito	Antonio Fortunato Stella	Miniseries	

== Awards and nominations ==
Award	Year	Category	Nominated work	Result	Ref.
Ciak d'Oro Serie TV	2023	Best Italian Actor	Everything Calls for Salvation	Nominated	
Nastri d'Argento Grandi Serie	2023	Best Supporting Actor	Everything Calls for Salvation	Won	

== Bibliography ==
- Pennacchi, Andrea (2019). Pojana e i suoi fratelli (in Italian). People. ISBN 978-8832089547.
- Pennacchi, Andrea (2020). La guerra dei Bepi (in Italian). People. ISBN 978-8832089950.
- Pennacchi, Andrea (2021). La storia infinita del Pojanistan (in Italian). People. ISBN 979-1280105721.
- Pennacchi, Andrea (2022). Shakespeare and me (in Italian). People. ISBN 979-1259790668.
- Pennacchi, Andrea (2023). Eroi (in Italian). People. ISBN 979-1259791610.
- Pennacchi, Andrea (2024). Se la rosa non avesse il suo nome (in Italian). Marsilio. ISBN 978-8829720354.
