= Skam Italia =

Italian teen drama television series (2018–present)

- Genre: Teen drama
- Created by: Ludovico Bessegato
- Based on: Skam
- Written by: Ludovico Bessegato; Anita Rivaroli; Marco Borromei; Alice Urciuolo; Ludovico Di Martino
- Directed by: Ludovico Bessegato; Ludovico Di Martino; Tiziano Russo
- Starring: Ludovica Martino; Federico Cesari; Benedetta Gargari; Beatrice Bruschi; Francesco Centorame; Nicole Rossi; Greta Ragusa
- Composers: Paola San Giorgio; Federico Diliberto Paulsen; Silvia Siano
- Country of origin: Italy
- Original language: Italian
- No. of seasons: 6
- No. of episodes: 62

Production
- Executive producers: Ludovico Bessegato; Marco Mastrogiacomo
- Producers: Rosario Rinaldo; Annamaria Morelli
- Cinematography: Benjamin Maier; Emanuele Pasquet
- Editor: Federico Palmerini
- Running time: 16–40 minutes
- Production company: Cross Productions

Original release
- Network: TIMvision; Netflix
- Release: 23 March 2018 – 13 January 2024

Skam Italia (often stylized as SKAM Italia) is an Italian teen drama television series based on the Norwegian television series Skam. The series first aired on 23 March 2018 on TIMvision.

== Plot ==
The series follows the daily lives of students at the Liceo J.F. Kennedy in Rome as they deal with typical issues of adolescence. Each season follows a different protagonist and centers on topics such as relationship insecurities, slut-shaming, coming out, mental illness, toxic masculinity, and anorexia nervosa. During the series' TIMvision run, clips were uploaded in real time. After the series' Netflix revival in season 4, episodes premiered in their entirety.

== Cast and characters ==
=== Central characters ===
| Actor | Character | Based on | First Generation | | | | | Second Generation |
| Actor | Character | Based on | 1 | 2 | 3 | 4 | 5 | 6 |
|---|---|---|---|---|---|---|---|---|
| Ludovica Martino | Eva Brighi | Eva Kviig Mohn | Central | Recurring | Main | Main | Recurring | Guest |
| Federico Cesari | Martino Rametta | Isak Valtersen | Main | Central | Recurring | Main | Main | Guest |
| Benedetta Gargari | Eleonora Sava | Noora Amalie Sætre | Main | Guest | Central | Guest | | |
| Beatrice Bruschi | Sana Allagui | Sana Bakkoush | Main | Main | Main | Central | Recurring | Guest |
| Francesco Centorame | Elia Santini | Elias | Recurring | Main | Guest | Main | Central | Main |
| Francesco Centorame | Elia Santini | Mahdi Disi | Recurring | Main | Guest | Main | Central | Main |
| Nicole Rossi | Asia Giovannelli | | | | | | Main | Central |

=== Main characters ===
| Actor | Character | Based on | First Generation | | | | | Second Generation |
| Actor | Character | Based on | 1 | 2 | 3 | 4 | 5 | 6 |
|---|---|---|---|---|---|---|---|---|
| Greta Ragusa | Silvia Mirabella | Vilde Hellerud Lien | Main | Recurring | Main | Main | Main | Recurring |
| Martina Lelio | Federica Cacciotti | Christina "Chris" Berg | Main | Recurring | Main | Main | Main | Guest |
| Ludovico Tersigni | Giovanni Garau | Jonas Noah Vasquez | Main | Main | Recurring | Main | Main | |
| Rocco Fasano | Niccolò Fares | Even Bech Næsheim | | Main | Recurring | Main | Main | Guest |
| Giancarlo Commare | Edoardo Incanti | William Magnusson | Recurring | Guest | Main | Guest | Guest | |
| Nicholas Zerbini | Luca Colosio | Magnus Fossbakken | | Main | Guest | Main | Main | Recurring |
| Pietro Turano | Filippo Sava | Eskild Tryggvasson | | Recurring | Main | Recurring | Main | Guest |
| Mehdi Meskar | Malik Doueiri | Yousef Acar | | | | Main | Recurring | |
| Ibrahim Keshk | Rami Allagui | Elias Bakkoush | | | | Main | Recurring | |
| Lea Gavino | Viola Loiero | | | | | | Main | Main |
| Maria Camilla Brandenburg | Rebecca Viviani | | | | | | Recurring | Main |
| Benedetta Santibelli | Fiorella Capuano | | | | | | Recurring | Main |
| Cosimo Longo | Jorge | | | | | | Recurring | Main |
| Yothin Clavenzani | Munny | | | | | | Recurring | Main |
| Andrea Palma | Giulio Telesca | | | | | | | Main |
| Leo Rivosecchi | Beniamino | | | | | | | Main |

=== Recurring and guest characters ===
| Actor | Character | Based on | First Generation | | | | | Second Generation | |
| Actor | Character | Based on | 1 | 2 | 3 | 4 | 5 | 6 | |
|---|---|---|---|---|---|---|---|---|---|
| Luca Grispini | Federico Canegallo | Christoffer "Penetrator-Chris" Schistad | Recurring | Guest | Recurring | Guest | | | |
| Nina Fotaras | Laura Pandakovic | Ingrid Theis Gaupseth | Recurring | Guest | Guest | Recurring | | | |
| Andrea Luna Posocco | Sara | Sara Nørstelien | Recurring | Guest | Guest | Recurring | | | |
| Martina Gatti | Emma Covitti | Emma W. Larzen | | Recurring | Guest | Recurring | Guest | | |
| Marina Occhionero | Maddalena | Sonja | | Recurring | | | | | |
| Mauro Lamanna | Andrea Incanti | Nikolai Magnusson | | | Recurring | | | | |
| Martina Querini | Marta | Mari Aspeflaten | | | Recurring | | | | |
| Ryan Daroui | Luai | Mikael Øverlie Boukhal | | | | Recurring | Guest | | |
| Danial Daroui | Driss | Adam Malik | | data-sort-value="" style="background: var(--background-color-interactive, #ececec); color: var(--color-base, inherit); vertical-align: middle; text-align: center; " class="table-na" | | | | Recurring | Guest | |
| Danial Daroui | Driss | Mutasim Tatouti | | data-sort-value="" style="background: var(--background-color-interactive, #ececec); color: var(--color-base, inherit); vertical-align: middle; text-align: center; " class="table-na" | | | | Recurring | Guest | |
| Sonia Amini | Maryam | Jamilla Bikarim | | | | Recurring | | | |
| Somaia Taha Ebrahim Halawa | Medja | Jamilla Bikarim | | | | Recurring | | | |
| Alice Luvisoni | Carlotta | | | | | Recurring | | | |
| Federica Lucaferri | Olly | | | | | | | Recurring | |
| Lorenzo Vigevano | Chicco Rodi | | Guest | Guest | Guest | Recurring | Guest | Guest | |
| Julia Wujkowska | Sofia | Dance Chicks | | | style="background: #DEF; color:black; vertical-align: middle; text-align: center; " class="table-cast"|Guest | | | | data-sort-value="" style="background: var(--background-color-interactive, #ececec); color: var(--color-base, inherit); vertical-align: middle; text-align: center; " class="table-na" | |
| Julia Wujkowska | Sofia | Isabell | | | style="background: #DEF; color:black; vertical-align: middle; text-align: center; " class="table-cast"|Guest | | | | data-sort-value="" style="background: var(--background-color-interactive, #ececec); color: var(--color-base, inherit); vertical-align: middle; text-align: center; " class="table-na" | |
| Giulia Schiavo | Alice | Iben Sandberg | Guest | | | | | | |

== Episodes ==
=== Series overview ===
| Series | Episodes | Originally released | | |
| Series | Episodes | First released | Last released | Network |
|---|---|---|---|---|
| 1 | 11 | 29 March 2018 | 8 June 2018 | TIMvision |
| 2 | 10 | 12 October 2018 | 24 December 2018 | TIMvision |
| 3 | 11 | 15 March 2019 | 7 June 2019 | TIMvision |
| 4 | 10 | 15 May 2020 | | Netflix |
| 5 | 10 | 1 September 2022 | | Netflix |
| 6 | 10 | 18 January 2024 | | Netflix |

=== Season 1 (2018) ===
The season focuses on Eva Brighi, a teenage girl who struggles with trusting her boyfriend, Giovanni, her former best friend's ex-boyfriend. She eventually finds new friends in Eleonora, Federica, Sana, and Silvia.

| No. overall | No. in season | Title | Duration | Original release date |
|---|---|---|---|---|
| 1 | 1 | "You look like a wh*re" (Sembri una pu**ana) | 22 min | 29 March 2018 |
| 2 | 2 | "You're an as**ole" (Sei uno str***o) | 20 min | 4 April 2018 |
| 3 | 3 | "A party where nobody wants you" (Una festa a cui nessuno ti vuole) | 22 min | 14 April 2018 |
| 4 | 4 | "Does your boyfriend know we're texting?" (Il tuo ragazzo lo sa che ci scriviamo?) | 22 min | 20 April 2018 |
| 5 | 5 | "What turns you on?" (Cosa ti eccita?) | 22 min | 28 April 2018 |
| 6 | 6 | "Laura told me everything" (Laura mi ha detto tutto) | 24 min | 5 May 2018 |
| 7 | 7 | "I made a mess" (Ho fatto un casino) | 23 min | 11 May 2018 |
| 8 | 8 | "Everyone at school knows" (Lo sanno tutti a scuola) | 23 min | 18 May 2018 |
| 9 | 9 | "If you all hate me so much" (Se vi faccio a tutti così schifo) | 21 min | 25 May 2018 |
| 10 | 10 | "Why did you do something like that to me?" (Perché mi hai fatto una cosa del genere?) | 19 min | 1 June 2018 |
| 11 | 11 | "A stupid choice" (Una scelta stupida) | 29 min | 8 June 2018 |

=== Season 2 (2018) ===
The season broke from the traditional Skam order of central characters, instead centering on Martino Rametta, a closeted gay teenager. He quickly finds himself falling in love with Niccolò, who struggles with borderline personality disorder and a tenuous family situation.

| No. overall | No. in season | Title | Duration | Original release date |
|---|---|---|---|---|
| 12 | 1 | "I've never seen you" (Non ti ho mai visto) | 37 min | 12 October 2018 |
| 13 | 2 | "Tabasco" | 31 min | 20 October 2018 |
| 14 | 3 | "Virility" (Virilità) | 23 min | 29 October 2018 |
| 15 | 4 | "Holding Your Breath" (Trattenere il Respiro) | 23 min | 1 November 2018 |
| 16 | 5 | "The Last Man on Earth" (L'Ultimo Uomo sulla Terra) | 35 min | 10 November 2018 |
| 17 | 6 | "City - Real" | 22 min | 24 November 2018 |
| 18 | 7 | "The Wizard of Love" (Il Mago dell'Amore) | 30 min | 2 December 2018 |
| 19 | 8 | "Have a Nice Trip" (Buon Viaggio) | 30 min | 8 December 2018 |
| 20 | 9 | "Follies" (Follie) | 21 min | 17 December 2018 |
| 21 | 10 | "Minute by Minute" (Minuto Per Minuto) | 32 min | 24 December 2018 |

=== Season 3 (2019) ===
The season focuses on Eleonora Sava, who prides herself on being independent and wise beyond her years. However, her confidence is threatened when she has to face her romantic feelings for Edoardo, a popular boy at school, and is the victim of revenge porn.

| No. overall | No. in season | Title | Duration | Original release date |
|---|---|---|---|---|
| 22 | 1 | "Leave with me" (Esci con me) | 35 min | 15 March 2019 |
| 23 | 2 | "It's you" (Sei tu) | 23 min | 22 March 2019 |
| 24 | 3 | "Tell him I'll be back tomorrow" (Digli che torno domani) | 27 min | 29 March 2019 |
| 25 | 4 | "This is why I don't like you" (È per questo che non mi piaci) | 21 min | 5 April 2019 |
| 26 | 5 | "I'll never hurt you" (Non ti farò mai del male) | 19 min | 12 April 2019 |
| 27 | 6 | "Stop" (Basta) | 16 min | 19 April 2019 |
| 28 | 7 | "Brothers" (Fratelli) | 19 min | 3 May 2019 |
| 29 | 8 | "Oops" (Ops) | 16 min | 10 May 2019 |
| 30 | 9 | "Fever" (Febbre) | 22 min | 17 May 2019 |
| 31 | 10 | "Tell me too" (Dimmelo anche tu) | 17 min | 31 May 2019 |
| 32 | 11 | "Three, two, one" (Tre, due, uno) | 24 min | 7 June 2019 |

=== Season 4 (2020) ===
The season focuses on Sana Allagui, a Muslim-Italian girl, who struggles to balance her faith and her friendships, and develops feelings for her brother's best friend, Malik, a non-Muslim.

| No. overall | No. in season | Title | Duration | Original release date |
|---|---|---|---|---|
| 33 | 1 | "Italian" (Italiana) | 31 min | 15 May 2020 |
| 34 | 2 | "Mykonos" | 29 min | 15 May 2020 |
| 35 | 3 | "Sin" (Peccato) | 23 min | 15 May 2020 |
| 36 | 4 | "Total eclipse" (Eclissi totale) | 22 min | 15 May 2020 |
| 37 | 5 | "Alpha Males" (Maschi Alfa) | 24 min | 15 May 2020 |
| 38 | 6 | "Your little friend" (L'amichetta tua) | 30 min | 15 May 2020 |
| 39 | 7 | "Stupid questions" (Domande stupide) | 29 min | 15 May 2020 |
| 40 | 8 | "The losers" (Le sfigate) | 28 min | 15 May 2020 |
| 41 | 9 | "Close your eyes" (Chiudi gli occhi) | 34 min | 15 May 2020 |
| 42 | 10 | "Together" (Insieme) | 40 min | 15 May 2020 |

=== Season 5 (2022) ===
The season focuses on Elia Santini, who struggles with toxic masculinity and sexual intimacy, stemming from his micropenis. He finds himself drawn to classmate Viola, who also struggles with intimacy after being groomed by a teacher at their school.

| No. overall | No. in season | Title | Duration | Original release date |
|---|---|---|---|---|
| 43 | 1 | "As usual" (Come al solito) | 23 min | 1 September 2022 |
| 44 | 2 | "Baran" | 21 min | 1 September 2022 |
| 45 | 3 | "Mister Kennedy" | 23 min | 1 September 2022 |
| 46 | 4 | "Free love" (Amore libero) | 24 min | 1 September 2022 |
| 47 | 5 | "Never" (Mai) | 26 min | 1 September 2022 |
| 48 | 6 | "Anniversary" (Anniversario) | 22 min | 1 September 2022 |
| 49 | 7 | "A bigger one" (Uno più grande) | 21 min | 1 September 2022 |
| 50 | 8 | "Am I wrong?" (Mi sbaglio?) | 24 min | 1 September 2022 |
| 51 | 9 | "Undress" (Spogli) | 24 min | 1 September 2022 |
| 52 | 10 | "Our adventure" (La nostra avventura) | 30 min | 1 September 2022 |

=== Season 6 (2024) ===
The season focuses on Asia Giovannelli, who struggles with anorexia and the pressures of school. She and her friend group, "The Rebels", are challenged by the arrival of new students at their school.

| No. overall | No. in season | Title | Duration | Original release date |
|---|---|---|---|---|
| 53 | 1 | "A little without" (Un po' senza) | 24 min | 18 January 2024 |
| 54 | 2 | "Popular" (Popolari) | 27 min | 18 January 2024 |
| 55 | 3 | "Grams" (Grammi) | 26 min | 18 January 2024 |
| 56 | 4 | "In the end" (Alla fine) | 22 min | 18 January 2024 |
| 57 | 5 | "The boy who carried the egg" (Il ragazzo che portava l'uovo) | 29 min | 18 January 2024 |
| 58 | 6 | "Control" (Il controllo) | 30 min | 18 January 2024 |
| 59 | 7 | "Monte del Grano" | 20 min | 18 January 2024 |
| 60 | 8 | "The ethical state" (Lo Stato etico) | 22 min | 18 January 2024 |
| 61 | 9 | "Observation" (Osservazione) | 25 min | 18 January 2024 |
| 62 | 10 | "To say goodbye" (Per salutarvi) | 29 min | 18 January 2024 |

== Production ==
In October 2017, it was announced that the Norwegian teen drama television series Skam (2015–2017) would be remade in several European countries, including Italy. After being renewed for a second season, it was revealed that the Italian series would follow a different order from the Norwegian series, with the second season focusing on Martino.

== Release ==
The first season, which was directed by Ludovico Bessegato, was released on TIMvision on 23 March 2018. The series was renewed for a second season on 11 June 2018, and its first episode was released on 12 October 2018.

The first episode of the third season was released on 15 May 2019. On 7 August 2019, the series was cancelled by TIMvision after three seasons. However, it was picked up for a fourth season by Netflix on 19 December 2019. Netflix acquired the rights to distribute the first three seasons on 1 January 2020, and the fourth season was released on the platform on 15 May 2020.

Netflix announced that the series had been renewed for a fifth season on 14 June 2021. The trailer was released on 24 August 2022, and the season was released on Netflix on 1 September 2022. The entire sixth season was released on 18 January 2024.

== Awards and nominations ==
| Award | Year | Category | Result | Ref. |
|---|---|---|---|---|
| Diversity Media Awards | 2019 | Best Italian TV Series | Won | |
| Diversity Media Awards | 2021 | Best Italian TV Series | Won | |
| Nastri d'Argento Grandi Serie | 2021 | Best Teen Series | Won | |
| Parma Film Festival | 2020 | Invenzioni dal Vero – Best Italian Series | Won | |
| Ciak d'Oro Serie TV | 2023 | Best Audience Series Under 30 | Nominated | |
