= Dog Years (2021 film) =

2021 Italian comedy film

- Italian: Anni da cane
- Directed by: Fabio Mollo
- Written by: Alessandro Bosi; Mary Stella Brugiati
- Starring: Aurora Giovinazzo; Isabella Mottinelli; Federico Cesari; Luca Vannuccini; Romana Maggiora Vergano; Sabrina Impacciatore; Achille Lauro
- Cinematography: Martina Cocco
- Edited by: Filippo Maria Montemurro; Francesco Panetta
- Music by: Rocco Centrella
- Production companies: Amazon Studios; Notorious Pictures
- Distributed by: Amazon Prime Video
- Release dates: 19 October 2021 (Rome); 22 October 2021
- Country: Italy
- Language: Italian

Dog Years (Italian: Anni da cane) is a 2021 Italian comedy film directed by Fabio Mollo and written by Alessandro Bosi and Mary Stella Brugiati. The film stars Aurora Giovinazzo, Isabella Mottinelli, Federico Cesari and Sabrina Impacciatore.

It premiered on 19 October 2021 at the Rome Film Festival and was released via Amazon Prime Video on 22 October 2021.

== Plot ==
Stella is a teenage girl living in Rome who is about to turn 16. After surviving a car accident involving a dog, she becomes convinced that human age should be calculated in the same way as a dog's, leading her to believe that she is actually 112 years old and nearing the end of her life. Disillusioned with love and uninterested in romantic relationships, she lives with her elderly dog, Piedino, her divorced mother Rita, who is obsessed with tarot cards, and her 18-year-old sister Ludovica, who is her exact opposite.

Fearing that she has little time left, Stella draws up a bucket list of experiences she wants to have before she dies, with the help of her friends Nina and Giulio. She decides to include the losing of her virginity when she meets Matte, a shy and awkward boy who challenges her assumptions about life and her own future.

== Cast ==
- Aurora Giovinazzo as Stella
- Isabella Mottinelli as Nina
- Federico Cesari as Matte
- Luca Vannuccini as Giulio
- Romana Maggiora Vergano as Ludovica
- Paola Gioia Kaze Formisano as Federica
- Marta Losito as Marta
- Jia Ting Ting as Marta Zhang
- Isnaba Na Montche as Davide
- Giulio Fochetti as Francesco
- Jun Lancini as Lorenzo Zhang
- Yoon C. Joyce as Tian Zhang
- Sabrina Impacciatore as Rita
- Achille Lauro as himself
- Valerio Mastandrea as Stella's father
