= Mediaset Premium (company) =

Mediaset subsidiary active in the television sector

Mediaset Premium S.p.A.
- Company type: Subsidiary
- Industry: Mass media
- Founded: December 1, 2014; 11 years ago
- Founder: Pier Silvio Berlusconi
- Defunct: April 1, 2019; 7 years ago
- Headquarters: Cologno Monzese, Milan, Italy
- Key people: Pier Silvio Berlusconi (CEO)
- Products: Subscription television channels
- Owner: Mediaset
- Number of employees: ▲

Mediaset Premium S.p.A. was a Mediaset subsidiary active in the television sector. The company managed the distribution of pay television channels that were available on the television platform of the same name and for the satellite platform Sky.

== History ==
The spin-off of Mediaset Premium from Mediaset was approved on November 13, 2014, operational from December 1; with the approval, the Spanish company Telefónica acquired 11.11% of the shares. The rest remained, for the time, under the hands of RTI, which was mooting possible partnerships with new partners by the start of the 2015–2016 UEFA Champions League season, of which it gained the exclusive rights. The new company had 267 employees.

On April 8, 2016, after weeks of press speculation giving the green light for the agreement with Vivendi, the official announcement came, with a 3.5% share between the main Mediaset group and the French company. On May 10, 2016, the operational costs of Mediaset Premium during the first quarter of 2016 showed a loss that was never seen before: a fall of over €56 million (in 2015, Premium registered a deficit of €85 million), with a total indebtment of over €200 million. In projection, analysis predicted a fall of over €200 million during the rest of 2016. In July, the Mediaset administrative council announced that in the first semester of 2016, they pay-TV platform Mediaset Premium registered losses of €100 million (€63 million in the first quarter and €37 million in the second).

On June 21, 2016, Vincent Bolloré sent a letter to Mediaset's directive regarding "significant divergences in the analysis of Mediaset Premium's results", according to Vivendi. Two weeks later, at the presentation of the schedules for the new season on the Mediaset channels, Pier Silvio Berlusconi, vice-president and administrative director Mediaset, noted that for the agreement that was scheduled for late September, "it all depends smoothly: it depends on the Antitrust, a decision that concerns the buyer". Shortly before, Mediaset's financial director, Marco Giordani, on the hypothesis of a discount solicited by Vivendi, affirmed the absence of a solicitation. On July 22, 2016, Mediaset sent Vivendi a warning for breach of contract based on a three-point consensus: lack of communication of the agreement at the Antitrust Committee, lack of participation at the UEFA matches for the Champions League broadcasts, closure of communications during Premium's interim phase.

Vivendi's new proposal (15% of Mediaset's shares and 20% of Premium's) was rejected: Mediaset Mediaset accused the French holding company of actually wanting to carry out a takeover of Mediaset's shareholding in order to take control of the Berlusconi's group. It also threatened civil and criminal legal action against Vivendi. On October 12, 2016 Mediaset requested the opening of an emergency procedure to seize the 3.5% of Vivendi shares that the French were supposed to transfer in exchange for 100% of Premium. The Milan court initially set the precautionary hearing for November 8, later delayed to November 23. On November 18, 2016, a few days away from the precautionary hearing in Milan, Mediaset decided to renounce from this urgent appeal, considering itself reassured by the documentation deposited by Vivendi at the registry of the Milan court.

The affair complicated even more when, on December 13, 2016, Vivendi announced the acquisition of over 12% of Mediaset's shares, increasing to 20% the following day and over 25% on December 20, with the intent of reaching 30%. This triggered a reaction from Fininvest, who accused Vivendi of not respecting the Premium contract for devaluing the Mediaset shares and attempting a hostile escalation.

On March 30, 2018, the signing of a pact between the pay-TV operators of Mediaset and Sky Italia was announced, where the five movie channels and four series channels, available only on Mediaset Premium, became visible to Sky subscribers via satellite, whereas Sky offered in exchange part of its sports offer. On May 2, 2018 Mediaset Premium S.p.A. was transferred to R2 S.r.l., the branch of the company regarding the service offer for "publishing of subscription conent" (specifically, Sky Italia).

On April 1, 2019, both the channels and the Mediaset Premium commercial offer were handed back to RTI and the company ceased its operations.
