= Bare Hands (film) =

2024 film by Mauro Mancini

- Italian theatrical release poster
- Italian: Mani nude
- Directed by: Mauro Mancini
- Written by: Mauro Mancini; Davide Lisino
- Based on: Mani nude by Paola Barbato
- Produced by: Giuseppe Saccà; Agostino Saccà; Mario Mazzarotto
- Starring: Alessandro Gassmann; Francesco Gheghi; Fotinì Peluso; Renato Carpentieri; Paolo Madonna; Giordana Marengo
- Cinematography: Sandro Chessa
- Edited by: Gianluca Scarpa
- Music by: Dardust
- Production companies: Eagle Original Content; Pepito Produzioni; Movimento Film; Rai Cinema
- Distributed by: Medusa Film
- Release dates: 23 October 2024 (Rome); 5 June 2025 (Italy)
- Running time: 124 minutes
- Country: Italy
- Language: Italian

Bare Hands (Italian: Mani nude) is a 2024 Italian drama film directed by Mauro Mancini, based on the novel of the same name by Paola Barbato. It premiered at the 19th Rome Film Festival on 23 October 2024, and received a theatrical release in Italy on 5 June 2025.

== Premise ==
18-year-old Davide is kidnapped and forced into an underground fight club.

== Cast ==
- Alessandro Gassmann as Minuto
- Francesco Gheghi as Davide
- Fotinì Peluso
- Renato Carpentieri
- Paolo Madonna
- Giordana Marengo

== Production ==
Principal photography began in 2023. The film was shot in Calabria, specifically in Cosenza, Cetraro, Sangineto, Rovito, Marano Principato, Rose, Castiglione Cosentino, Sant'Andrea Apostolo dello Ionio, Soverato, and Acquappesa. It was also shot in Bulgaria.

== Release ==
The film premiered at the 19th Rome Film Festival on 23 October 2024. It received a theatrical release in Italy on 5 June 2025.
