= 666 Park Avenue =

American supernatural drama television series (2012–2013)

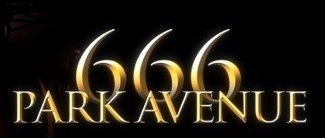
- Genre: Supernatural; Horror fiction; Drama; Action
- Based on: 666 Park Avenue by Gabriella Pierce
- Developed by: David Wilcox
- Starring: Rachael Taylor; Dave Annable; Robert Buckley; Mercedes Mason; Erik Palladino; Helena Mattsson; Samantha Logan; Vanessa Williams; Terry O'Quinn
- Composer: Trevor Morris
- Country of origin: United States
- Original language: English
- No. of seasons: 1
- No. of episodes: 13

Production
- Executive producers: Alex Graves; Leslie Morgenstein; Gina Girolamo; David Wilcox; Matt Miller
- Producer: Mary Rae Thewlis
- Cinematography: Derick V. Underschultz; Anette Haellmigk (pilot only)
- Editor: Russell Denove
- Running time: 43 minutes
- Production companies: Alloy Entertainment; Bonanza Productions; Warner Bros. Television

Original release
- Network: ABC
- Release: September 30, 2012 – July 13, 2013

666 Park Avenue is an American supernatural drama television series that aired on ABC from September 30, 2012, to July 13, 2013. The series was developed and produced by David Wilcox, and was loosely based upon the novel of the same name by author Gabriella Pierce. The show stars Rachael Taylor, Dave Annable, Vanessa Williams, and Terry O'Quinn and follows a couple who learns that the Manhattan apartment building that they just moved into, including its upscale tenants, might be possessed by a mysterious demonic force.

The elaborate Beaux-Arts building located on the old money Upper East Side of Manhattan called "The Drake" in the series is an actual apartment building, The Ansonia in Upper West Side.

ABC ordered the pilot on January 20, 2012, and it was picked up for a full season of 13 episodes on May 11, 2012. It aired on Sunday evenings at 10:00 pm Eastern/9:00 pm Central, with the series Revenge serving as its lead in. On November 16, 2012, after the seventh episode aired, ABC announced that the series had been canceled, but that it would finish its 13-episode run.

On December 21, 2012, after the ninth episode aired, ABC announced that the series had been removed from its schedule, with the remaining four episodes to be burned off in the dead of the summer 2013 schedule. The original time slot was taken by Happy Endings and Don't Trust the B— in Apartment 23. The final four episodes were first broadcast in Spain, then aired in Australia, New Zealand and the United Kingdom, before airing in the United States from June 22 to July 13, 2013.

== Plot ==
666 Park Avenue focuses on Jane Van Veen (Rachael Taylor) and her partner Henry Martin (Dave Annable), the new co-managers of the Drake residential hotel, located at 999 Park Avenue. The Drake is owned by mysterious billionaire couple Gavin (Terry O'Quinn) and Olivia Doran (Vanessa Williams). The plot follows both Jane and Henry, and the other residents of the Drake who live in the shadow of the dark supernatural forces of the Drake and its owners.

== Cast and characters ==
=== Main ===
- Rachael Taylor as Jane Van Veen, the new co-manager of the building
- Dave Annable as Henry Martin, the new co-manager of the building
- Robert Buckley as Brian Leonard, a playwright, who lives in the building with his wife Louise
- Mercedes Mason as Louise Leonard, Brian's wife, a photographer
- Helena Mattsson as Alexis Blume, assistant and friend of Louise
- Samantha Logan as Nona Clark, a resident with a unique gift
- Erik Palladino as Tony DeMeo, the doorman of the building
- Vanessa Williams as Olivia Doran, the coldly beautiful and sophisticated wife of the building's owner
- Terry O'Quinn as Gavin Doran, the building's mysterious owner and the series' primary antagonist

=== Recurring ===
- Richard Short as Harlan Moore
- Misha Kuznetsov as Kandinsky
- Teddy Sears as Detective Hayden Cooper
- Aubrey Dollar as Annie Morgan
- Enrique Murciano as Dr. Todd Scott Evans
- Tessa Thompson as Laurel Harris / Sasha Doran
- Nick Chinlund as Victor Shaw

== Episodes ==
No.	Title	Directed by	Written by	Original release date	Prod. code	U.S. viewers (millions)
1	"Pilot"	Alex Graves	David Wilcox	September 30, 2012	296822	6.90
Jane Van Veen and her boyfriend Henry Martin are hired as the new managers of "The Drake", a luxury 13-story hotel located at 999 Park Avenue in Manhattan, New York City. Henry and Jane both try to form a friendship with the owners of the hotel, billionaires Olivia and Gavin Doran, who (unknown to most of the tenants) are immortal agents of Hell assigned to target weak and corrupt people in order collect their souls. Meanwhile, new tenant Brian finds himself distracted by a mysterious and seductive young woman, named Alexis, who lives in the loft across the street. Nona, another shady tenant, steals Jane's necklace and is revealed to have the ability to see into other people's lives and deaths.
2	"Murmurations"	Robert Duncan McNeill	David Wilcox	October 7, 2012	2J7352	4.99
Jane tries to find out more about the Drake and uncovers the secrets behind the dragon mosaic that she found in the basement. Henry and Gavin go golfing, only to meet someone that Henry is working against in court, which makes Henry realize that he could get in serious trouble for talking to the man. Meanwhile, Louise ends up in the hospital from the elevator accident that happened, while Brian is at home Alexis walks in on him after a shower and they share a kiss. Jane continues to research about the Drake and finds birds in the wall of one of the hotel rooms. After realizing that there are more birds than she could handle she calls an exterminator who soon goes missing. Nona has a vision of the exterminator's death at the hands of the demonic birds. Jane eventually realizes that the birds are a part of the Drake. Elsewhere, Danielle, another tenant, is set up by Gavin on a date to further her career only to end up murdering the guy after discovering that her date is married.
3	"The Dead Don't Stay Dead"	Alex Zakrzewski	Matt Miller	October 14, 2012	2J7353	4.82
Jane starts seeing a little girl in the laundry room and every time she tries to talk to her, she disappears. Gavin tries to talk Henry into a career change into politics, only for Henry to turn him down. Olivia confides in Jane that her and Gavin's teenage daughter, Sasha, died 10 years earlier in an auto accident; Olivia tells Jane that it was actually a suicide. Meanwhile, a young journalist named Annie Morgan, another tenant at the hotel, starts writing articles to see if it could help boost her journalism career. She goes to Gavin after she writes about a non-existent killer, and the killer materializes and ends up going after her. When Annie goes to Gavin he promises to deal with the problem, only for him to ask her to send the killer after someone else. Jane continues to search for her missing necklace, and finds out that people have been having stuff stolen from them for a long time and sets off to find the thief.
4	"Hero Complex"	John Behring	Elizabeth Craft & Sarah Fain	October 21, 2012	2J7354	4.81
Henry learns Gavin is under investigation and is threatened to help put Gavin away in prison or his career would not survive. Nona has a meeting with a social worker and ends up stealing her sunglasses. When the worker asks Jane if she's seen them, Jane finally realizes that the thief is Nona. Jane confronts Nona and says that she won't turn her in if she returns everything that she stole. That night, before going to a party at the mayor's home, Nona has a vision of Henry getting murdered by the same man that Annie had created up the day before. Nona then tells Jane and warns her not to let Henry out of her sight but refuses to tell her why aware that it will reveal her powers. At the party, Jane witnesses the man Nona described grabbing a gun, she yells Henry's name and saves his life. Nonetheless, the tenant Annie Morgan pays the price by having the bullet strike her in the head... and her soul is sent to Hell as well.
5	"A Crowd of Demons"	Robert Duncan McNeill	Sonny Postiglione	October 28, 2012	2J7355	4.61
While Olivia finishes planning for the Drake's annual Halloween ball, it reminds her of a rather memorable Halloween back in 1929 when a man murdered his wife and his daughter survived. Jane then finds an article on the attack and finds that the girl is the same girl Jane has been seeing; a ghost. The ghost daughter tells Jane that her father has escaped the suitcase, only for the man to chase Jane through the hotel attempting to murder her with an axe. Gavin works to save Olivia's life when he receives threatening texts; later on Olivia is kidnapped. Gavin finds her and he also finds that a box of his has been stolen. Meanwhile, Brian starts to think that Louise is cheating on him when he finds her in the room alone with Dr. Scott Evans. After continually asking Dr. Scott for pills, he finally confronts Louise about his suspicions on her drug addiction, stating that he won't tell anyone if she helps herself.
6	"Diabolic"	Allison Liddi Brown	Christopher Hollier	November 4, 2012	2J7356	3.99
Jane and Henry deal with the aftermath of Jane being attacked, with Jane having nightmares, and both of them talking to the police. After they talk to the police, they find that everything Jane experienced the night before isn't there anymore. Meanwhile, Gavin continues to try to find the box that was stolen from him the night before, eventually finding the man responsible, and Olivia finds out that the reason she passed out was because of too much alcohol, or so Dr. Todd tells her, only for him to tell Gavin that he saw in the blood test that Olivia had been drugged. During lunch with Jane, a man comes by and tells Olivia that she needs to get away from Gavin before he tears him apart. Elsewhere, Laurel continues to help Henry skyrocket his career, stating that he needs to stay being the most eligible bachelor. Jane tells one of the cops about what really happened the night before.
7	"Downward Spiral"	J. Miller Tobin	Leigh Dana Jackson & Mimi Won Techentin	November 11, 2012	2J7357	3.90
In a flashback to 1998, Nona's pregnant mother Melissa comes to visit her mother at the Drake, only for her mother to tell her to leave and not return until after Nona is born. On her way out, Melissa gets stuck in an elevator and gives birth to Nona there. In the present day, Henry gets awarded for stopping the gunman a week before, while Jane continues to say she wants to leave. Meanwhile, Brian decides to leave Louise for Alexis, while Henry decides to ask Jane to marry him, with the help of Olivia and Gavin. Also, Nona finds her grandmother in the hallway, telling her to not let Jane leave.
8	"What Ever Happened to Baby Jane?"	Dean White	Josh Pate	November 25, 2012	2J7358	3.94
Henry finds a confused and scared Jane in the hospital. She wishes to go home, but he thinks she is safer there. Jane later learns her behavior is similar to another patient's: Julian Waters. She visits him and sees he has written symbols on his wall and writes them on her wall. Shaw tells Gavin that Olivia knows the truth about Sasha's death – that she killed herself out of fear of Gavin. Olivia confirms this, telling him that she was trying to protect him. Gavin goes to retrieve the red box at church where Shaw had placed it, while Olivia confronts Shaw. He tells her that Sasha is still alive and can take Olivia to see her, if she releases him. Kandinsky and Gavin later arrive to find Shaw's empty chair. Jane is released from the hospital and is visited by Nona, who knows someone who can help her. One of Julian's symbols can be seen etched in the door frame of Maris's apartment as Jane rings the doorbell.
9	"Hypnos"	Stephen Cragg	Ellen Fairey & Matthew Tabak	December 2, 2012	2J7359	3.96
For 26 years, Maris Elder (Whoopi Goldberg) has stayed in her apartment at the Drake. Jane seeks her help in remembering what happened when she went down the spiral stairs in the Drake's basement. Maris hypnotizes her and she transports back to 1927 to meet a woman named Libby, who Jane thinks is the one she's been seeing in the mirror. Jane finds a journal in the old Kramer apartment that contains the symbols. Further hypnosis reveals that Libby offered herself for a ritual killing, in order to spare Jane's grandmother Jocelyn. With the past and present connected, Maris is able to leave the Drake. Meanwhile, Olivia demands Shaw to take her to Sasha. She goes inside a building, leaving Tony and Shaw outside with a nearby armed Kandinsky watching. She finds an empty apartment while, outside, Shaw has been shot. Elsewhere, Gavin is given Jane's medical file, complete with her psychiatric history, which he intends to use to ruin Henry's political future. Gavin believes the leak to be Laurel Harris and goes to a noisy bar to meet her. "Laurel" actually turns out to be his daughter Sasha.
10	"The Comfort of Death"	John Terlesky	Vincent Angell	January 29, 2013 (Spain); June 22, 2013 (U.S.)	2J7360	2.01
Gavin makes Sasha and Olivia meet again. Someone leaks a Councilman Sullivan's scandal to the press and Henry suspects Gavin. Henry and Jane decide to leave the candidacy. Jane looks at a mirror and she sees Libby doing the same symbol that appears in Kramer's diary and Maris Elder's door. Seeking the key to decrypt the encrypted diary, Jane goes to the house of a member's descendant of the Order of the Dragon. She meets Harlan Moore there. He is the man wearing the ring on the sacrifice. Now he is 117 years old, he is alive but very ill. He tells Jane that she has to open a door in the heart of the building to save Libby. Seeking the door, Jane finds a mirror in the basement. Meanwhile, Alexis is indebted to Gavin because she walks thanks to him. On January 19, she was hit by a car and since then she was in a wheelchair. Alexis drugs Louise's drink, and Louise tells her that on January 19, she hit someone with the car and then went on the run. Gavin and Sasha convince Henry to continue with the candidacy. Jane breaks the mirror while dreaming and she manages to free Libby's soul, but also, a dark mass escapes. The dark mass is thrown at her and she wakes up suddenly. The black mass reaches under the bed of Harlan Moore, who rejuvenates.
11	"Sins of the Fathers"	Omar Madha	David Wilcox & Adria Lang	February 5, 2013 (Spain); June 29, 2013 (U.S.)	2J7361	2.14
Gavin and Sasha are discussing Henry's campaign. Sasha suggests that Henry should start talking at community meetings personally to gain popularity. And she suggests that they start with the Saint Thomas Church, the largest church. Meanwhile, the church's Cardinal is tormented as he is seeing demons. Sasha meets the church's Cardinal and tells him that he can make the demons go away if he kills Gavin Doran. She tells him that he would need to kill Gavin with a knife anointed with a king's blood on hallowed lands. As Gavin would be coming for Henry's speech, it would be a good opportunity to kill him. Sasha and the Cardinal attend an auction and get hold of the knife that killed Julius Caesar. At the church, the Cardinal makes a failed attempt to take Gavin's life. Sasha tries to kill her mother but Gavin reaches in time. Gavin tells Sasha that the Cardinal had failed because he too was not innocent enough to complete the task. Gavin opens the dragon mosaic to trap Sasha as Olivia looks on. Harlan Moore using the name Patrick Cory moves into Maris Elder's apartment (2D) and tells Jane that he will renovate the apartment himself. Patrick Cory tries to flirt with Louise. Louise is very angry to see Alexis and Brian kissing at the play rehearsal. She spends the night at Patrick Cory's apartment.
12	"The Elysian Fields"	Chris Misiano	Elizabeth Craft & Sarah Fain	February 12, 2013 (Spain); July 6, 2013 (U.S.)	2J7362	1.94
Two men break into Jane's apartment looking for Kramer's diary and steal it from her when she returns to the apartment. Louise wakes up to find herself in Patrick's apartment and returns to her apartment, where Alexis attempts to murder her with a knife. Louise picks up a rod and hits Alexis, instantly killing her. Jane suspects Cooper of stealing the diary and confronts him at the Elysian Fields. Cooper and Eunice Moore tell her that the "Conspiratii" originated in 1542, when a group of cardinals conspired to bring down the pope. Eventually, the conspiracy was discovered but one of the priests escaped. The group reassembled in secret and since then the Conspiratii have continued his mission of tracking down the last surviving agent of Satan. Cooper worries that Harlan is going to sacrifice Jane and rushes to the Drake to protect her. Gavin confronts Harlan in apartment 2D and Olivia traps Harlan in the box that is the heart of the Drake and source of all Gavin's power.
13	"Lazarus - Part 1"	Robert Duncan McNeill	Christopher Hollier & Leigh Dana Jackson	February 19, 2013 (Spain); July 13, 2013 (U.S.)	2J7363	1.56
Louise and Brian hide the body of Alexis in the basement of the Drake, but panic when they realize one of Louise's earrings may have fallen off in the alcove they bricked up. Jane discovers more about her past from her father, Nate. Louise and Brian return to the basement to find Alexis's body missing, and Gavin reveals the truth about his influence before sealing them in the same alcove. Nate attempts to take Jane from the Drake, but Gavin forces him to shoot Henry. With Henry dying and Nate fleeing, Jane appeals to Gavin for help, who reveals that he is her real father, and offers to save Henry...for a price. One year later, Nona keeps the flame alive by holding on to the necklace and continuing to save stories related to the Drake; Henry has become city councilor; and Jane, having accepted Gavin's offer, has a new career and is happily married to Henry. Gavin tells Jane she is destined to have a baby that will "bring the world to heel under his command". In the final scene, Jane tells Henry she is pregnant.

=== Ratings ===
#	Title	Air date	Rating/share (18–49)	Viewers (millions)	DVR (18–49)	DVR Viewers (millions)	Total (18–49)	Total Viewers (millions)
1	"Pilot"	September 30, 2012	2.1/5	6.90	1.1	2.64	3.2	9.54
2	"Murmurations"	October 7, 2012	1.7/4	4.99	0.9	—N/a	2.6	
3	"The Dead Don't Stay Dead"	October 14, 2012	1.5/4	4.82	0.8	—N/a	2.3	
4	"Hero Complex"	October 21, 2012	1.7/4	4.81	0.7	—N/a	2.4	
5	"A Crowd of Demons"	October 28, 2012	1.6/4	4.61	0.9	—N/a	2.5	
6	"Diabolic"	November 4, 2012	1.3/4	3.99	1.0	1.91	2.3	5.90
7	"Downward Spiral"	November 11, 2012	1.2/3	3.90	0.8	—N/a	2.0	
8	"What Ever Happened to Baby Jane?"	November 25, 2012	1.2/3	3.94	0.8	1.62	2.0	5.57
9	"Hypnos"	December 2, 2012	1.3/3	3.96	0.7	—N/a	2.0	
10	"The Comfort of Death"	June 22, 2013	0.5/2	2.01	—N/a	—N/a	—N/a	—N/a
11	"Sins of the Father"	June 29, 2013	0.5/2	2.14	—N/a	—N/a	—N/a	—N/a
12	"The Elysian Fields"	July 6, 2013	0.5/2	1.94	—N/a	—N/a	—N/a	—N/a
13	"Lazarus - Part 1"	July 13, 2013	0.3/1	1.56	—N/a	—N/a	—N/a	—N/a

== Production ==
Series star Vanessa Williams stated that she perceives the characters of Gavin and Olivia Doran as a "supernatural" Bernie and Ruth Madoff. "It's a world that I wanted to explore," she said. "It's the Upper East Side. It's luxurious. It's a couple that are very powerful. I thought about the Madoffs immediately because they were extremely wealthy. They had incredible land holdings all over that people knew about and knew that they had a great amount of wealth. And then we all saw the dark side and what happened and how they created their empire."

=== Hurricane Sandy ===
When Hurricane Sandy hit New York City in late October 2012, the sets of 666 Park Avenue were damaged.

== Criticism ==
One Million Moms, a Christian activist group known for trying to mobilize conservative women in protest against various media outlets, made 666 Park Avenue a target of its protestation. The organization, having taken exception to the show's use of the mark of the devil and believing that exposure to it was inappropriate, prompted its members to e-mail the sponsors of the network urging them to withdraw revenue from the show.

== Cancellation ==
On November 16, 2012, 666 Park Avenue was canceled by ABC. The network aired the 13 episodes produced, but ultimately decided to pass on the two extra scripts that were ordered. On November 21, 2012, it was announced that producers had been given enough notice of the show's cancellation that they were reworking the final episode to function as a series finale and give the fans closure. However, in the Eastern Time Zone, the finale was not seen in full on ABC, as the network broke into the last few minutes of the series for a bulletin regarding the verdict in the trial of George Zimmerman (though it would be seen in full in time zones westward and its streaming venues).

== Reception ==
Metacritic gave it an average score of 62% based on 22 reviews.

== International broadcasts ==
- In Australia, the show premiered on Fox8 on October 1, 2012, in the Monday 9:20pm slot.
- In Canada, the show aired in simulcast on City.
- In Quebec, Canada, the show aired on Ztélé.
- In Finland, the show premiered on MTV3 on February 4, 2014
- In India, the show premiered on Zee Café on October 18, 2013
- In the Netherlands, the show premiered on NET 5 on April 24, 2013.
- In New Zealand, the show premiered on TV2 on January 11, 2013, in the Friday 8:30pm slot. After the third episode it was shifted to the Sunday 11pm time slot. The series finale aired on April 21, 2013.
- In Portugal, the show aired on TVCineSeries.
- In France, the show premiered on Série Club on November 4, 2013. The series finale aired on December 9, 2013. In 2014, the show aired on HD1.
- In Spain, the show aired on Calle 13
- In the United Kingdom, the show aired on ITV2 from February 19, 2013, Tuesdays at 10pm. The final episode was broadcast on 14 May 2013.
- In Italy, the show premiered on Premium Action on November 4, 2013, in the Monday 9:15 slot.
- In Brazil, the show aired on SBT on May 24, 2014.
- In Slovenia, the show aired on Pop TV and Brio on October 4, 2014.
- In Bulgaria, the show started airing on bTV Lady on March 2, 2015, from Monday to Friday at 21:00.
- In Greece, the show airing on HOL TV in 2015–6 on demand on cable TV.
- In the Philippines, the show aired on GMA News TV by 2021.
