= Carlo Rinaldi =

Italian cinematographer and filmmaker (born 1981)

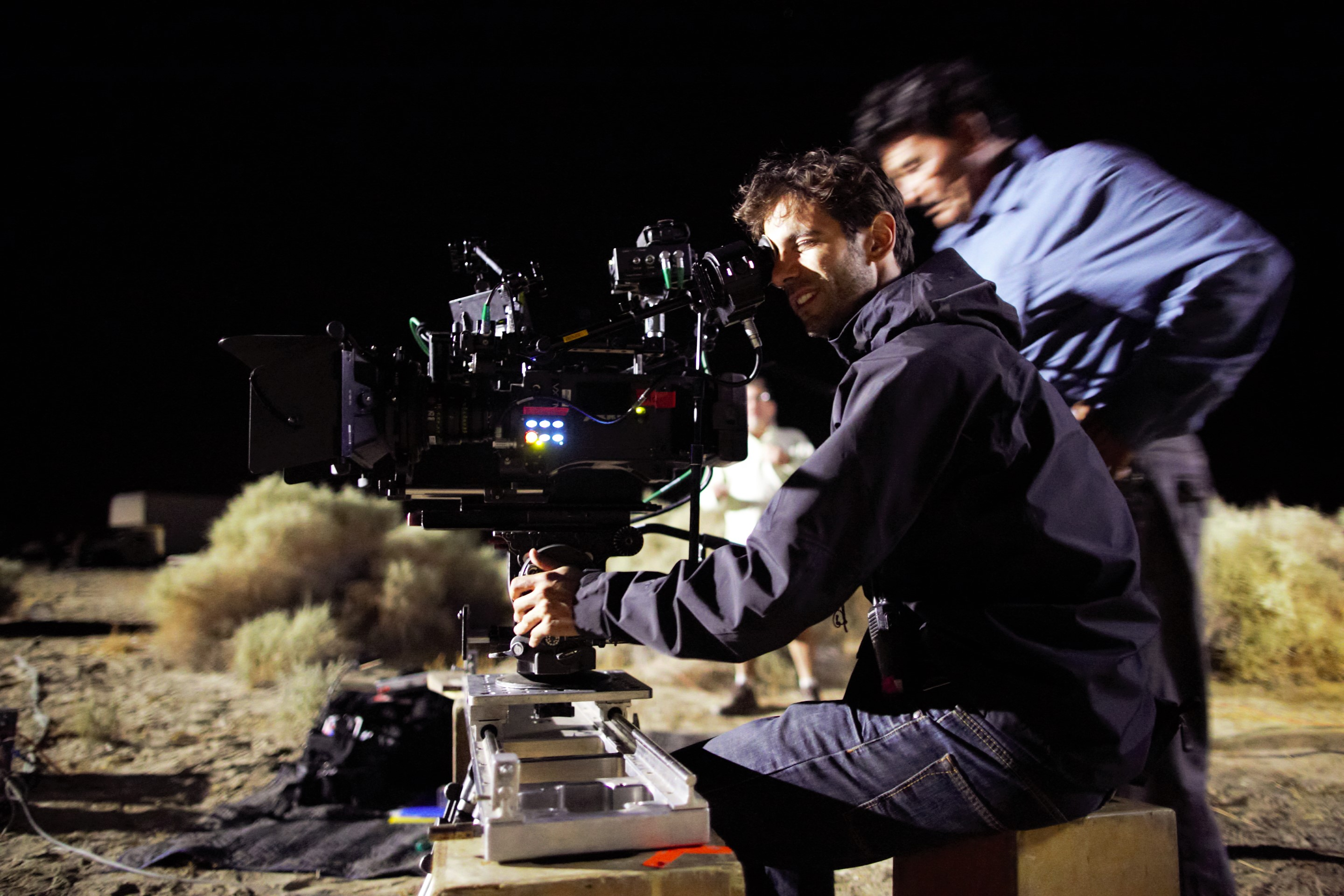
- Born: August 12, 1981 (age 45)
- Occupations: Cinematographer, filmmaker

Carlo Rinaldi (born August 12, 1981) is an Italian cinematographer and filmmaker.

== Notable works ==
His works include award-winning features The Predators, Everything's Gonna Be Alright the TV Series Il Re for SKY Studios as well as TV commercials for brands as General Motors, Samsung, Pfizer and music videos for Universal Music.

His work on the pilot for "Chimeras" has been published in the American Cinematographer Magazine.

He has lensed the TV Show "Guidance", a teenager drama show produced by AwesomenessTV in Los Angeles, and streaming on a Verizon platform (Go90). The show got more than 5 million views domestically, distribution in Canada and in the UK, and has been picked up by HULU for US domestic streaming.

In 2017, he shot the music video "Funeral Pyre" for the band Phantogram. The video is considered one of the best music videos of the year in the August 2017 VideoStatic review and got an article on Pitchfork, magazine that has a reputation for its extensive focus on independent music.

== Feature film debut ==
In 2018, Rinaldi shot his first feature in the USA "The haunting on long island: the Amityville murders", directed by Daniel Farrands and announced by the Hollywood Reporter as a new chapter of the famous Amytiville horror legacy. After his feature debut, he shot again with Farrands "The haunting of Sharon Tate", starring Hilary Duff, Jonathan Bennett, Lydia Hearst.

== International projects and Italian cinema ==
Carlo lensed in 2018 the Italian remake of the famous Danish movie "Adams æbler". Directed by actor and director Giorgio Pasotti, starring Giorgio Pasotti, Claudio Amendola and Robert Palfrader.

In 2019 Carlo was hired as Cinematographer for Pietro Castellitto's feature debut "I Predatori". The film was presented at the Horizons section of the 77th Venice International Film Festival, where it received the Best Screenplay Award, a David di Donatello for Best New Director to Pietro Castellitto, and a Silver Ribbon as best directorial debut.

That same year, Carlo served as Cinematographer for award-winning director Francesco Bruni's fourth feature Everything's Gonna Be Alright. The movie was critically acclaimed, nominated to two David di Donatello and won two Silver Ribbons.

Between 2020 and 2021 Carlo shot two TV Series: "Il Re", produced by Fremantle with 'The Apartment', a dark prison drama for SKY Studios airing/streaming on SKY networks in March 2022. And the highly anticipated Netflix Original “Everything Calls for Salvation”, written and directed by Francesco Bruni from the novel by Daniele Mencarelli, winner of "Premio Strega Giovani 2020".

== Professional affiliations ==
Carlo is member of AIC, Italian Society of Cinematographers. He is also member of the International Cinematographers Guild - IATSE Local 600.
