= The Braid (film) =

2023 melodrama film

- Theatrical release poster
- French: La Tresse
- Directed by: Laetitia Colombani
- Screenplay by: Laetitia Colombani; Sarah Kaminsky (collaboration)
- Based on: The Braid by Laetitia Colombani
- Produced by: Olivier Delbosc; Marc Missonnier; Richard Lalonde; Nicola Giuliano; Francesca Cima; Carlotta Calori; Viola Prestieri
- Starring: Kim Raver; Fotinì Peluso; Mia Maelzer
- Cinematography: Ronald Plante
- Edited by: Albertina Lastera
- Music by: Ludovico Einaudi
- Production companies: Curiosa Films; Moana Films; Forum Films; Indigo Film; SND; Panache Productions; La Compagnie Cinématographique; France 2 Cinéma; Proximus; VOO; BE TV
- Distributed by: SND (France); Indigo Film (Italy); Anga Distribution (Belgium); Sphere Films (Canada)
- Release date: 29 November 2023 (France)
- Running time: 121 minutes
- Countries: France; Canada; Italy; Belgium
- Languages: Hindi; Italian; English
- Box office: $9.6 million

The Braid (French: La Tresse) is a 2023 drama film directed by Laetitia Colombani based on her 2017 novel of the same name. It was theatrically released in France on 29 November 2023.

== Plot ==
Young mother Susmita lives in India and dreams of giving her little daughter an education, but they are Dalit (untouchables) and her husband is afraid of rebelling against the status quo. Italian Giulia, after an incident with her father, realizes that the family is left with large debts. A talented lawyer from Canada, Sarah, is about to receive a long-awaited promotion, but a serious diagnosis interferes with her plans. Three women, three secrets. They have never met and do not even know that in fact they are connected by something unique, an interweaving of destinies.

== Cast ==
=== India ===
- Mia Maelzer as Smita
- Sajda Pathan as Lalita, daughter of Smita
- Nehpal Gautam as Nagaraj, husband of Smita

=== Italy ===
- Fotinì Peluso as Giulia
- Avi Nash as Kamal
- Manuela Ventura as Giulia's mother
- Mimmo Mancini as Giulia's father
- Celeste Savino as Francesca
- Guendalina Losito as Adela
- Francesco Marinelli as Gino
- Lucia Zotti as Nonna

=== Canada ===
- Kim Raver as Sarah
- Sarah Abbott as Hannah
- Adrian Doroslovac as Ethan
- Dorian Doroslovac as Simon
- Sarah Camacho as Pamela
- Damon Runyan as Josh
- Katharine King So as Ines
- Marcel Jeannin as Gary
- Kenny Wong as Jeffrey
- Lydia Zadel as Maeva
- Katherine Adams as the judge
- Laetitia Colombani as Hannah's teacher

== Production ==
The Braid (French: La Tresse) is a drama film directed by Laetitia Colombani, based on her 2017 novel of the same name. The screenplay was co-written by Colombani and Sarah Kaminsky.

Filming began on 11 March 2022 in India. Canadian cinematographer Ronald Plante was DOP.

The film was produced by Olivier Delbosc (Curiosa Films); Marc Missonnier (Maona Films); Nicola Giuliano, Carlotta Calori, and Francesca Cima (Indigo Films); Richard Lalonde (Forum Films); and SND Groupe M6, France 2 Cinéma.

Albertine Lastera edited the film, and Ludovic Eidauni wrote the score.

== Release ==
Distribution was by SND in France, Indigo Film in Italy, Anga Distribution in Belgium, and Sphere Films in Canada.

La Tresse was released in French cinemas on 29 November 2023.

In Russia, the film was released theatrically on 30 May 2024.

== Reception ==
=== Critical response ===
Augustin Pietron-Locatelli, in Télérama, noted an absence of staging and an abuse of clichés, "dripping" music for a film which parallels stories which are not comparable. Andrew Parker (TheGATE.ca) wrote "The Braid raises some cultural and ethical questions that are left dangling in the breeze in favour of sending things out on a somewhat uplifting note after asking a lot of the audience up to that point".

Russian film critic of Kommersant Yulia Shagelman wrote: "Sarah's line was the most elaborate and reliable, but for some reason it's not very easy to be touched by how an Indian beggar, without knowing it, helped a woman with money and access to modern free (after all, we're talking about Canada) healthcare".
