= Amanti e Segreti =

- Created by: Gianni Lepre
- Country of origin: Italy
- No. of seasons: 2
- No. of episodes: 10

Production
- Running time: 100 min

Original release
- Network: Rai Uno, Rai Premium

Amanti e Segreti is a 2004 Italian six-part crime thriller miniseries directed by Gianni Lepre. Filming locations were Rome, Trieste, Ferrara and Tuscany. The first episode aired 16 March 2004 on Rai Uno. The series was a success, with an audience of about 9 million viewers. The series was sold to several foreign countries, including Japan, China, Latin America, Eastern Europe and Spain. A second season consisting in four episodes was produced and broadcast in 2005.

== Cast ==
Actor	Character
Monica Guerritore	Ambra Castelli/ Ambra Leonardi
Maurizio Aiello	Emilio Parenti
Christiane Filangieri	Marta Castelli/Marta Parenti
Sabrina Paravicini	Luisa Mari
Michele Lastella	Andrea Emiliani
Luigi Diberti	Marcello Lanci
Fabrizio Contri	Vittorio Lanci
Orso Maria Guerrini	Bendetto Ungari
Claudia Coli	Liliana Ungari
Valeria Ciangottini	Maria Giovanna Ungari
Giulia Lazzarini	Livia Castelli
Iaia Forte	Eva
Matteo Taranto	brigadier Moretti
Luca Lionello	Davide Luciani
Borut Veselko	Roman Kirnienko
Barbara Mautino	Tanja
Bruno Bilotta	Niko
Bendetta Gargari	Fiore Leonardi
Cesare Bocci	Max Leonardi
Romuald Klos	Alexander Borodyn (assassin Max)
Benedetta Gargari	Fiore Leonardi

== See also ==
- List of Italian television series
