= Benedetta Gargari =

Italian actress (born 1995)

- Born: 27 January 1995 (age 31); Rome, Italy
- Education: Roma Tre University
- Occupations: Actress; model
- Spouse: Tommaso Cocchi (m. 2024)

Benedetta Gargari (born 27 January 1995) is an Italian actress and model. She is best known for her role as Eleonora Sava in the teen drama television series Skam Italia (2018–2020).

== Early life, family and education ==
Gargari was born in Rome. Her younger sister Ludovica is also an actress.

In 2019, she received a law degree from Roma Tre University.

== Career ==
Gargari's career began by chance; at five years old, she was chosen for a commercial and continued pursuing acting.

After starring in Skam Italia, she chose to pursue a career in law.

== Personal life ==
She married Tommaso Cocchi on 25 May 2024.

== Filmography ==
=== Film ===
Year	Title	Role	Ref.
2003	Facing Windows	Martina	
2007	Saturn in Opposition	Giulia	
2011	Maledimiele	Sara	
2015	My Daughter's First Time	Bianca "Bibi" Santini	
2020	The Beast	Ragazza Discoteca	

=== Television ===
Year	Title	Role	Notes	Ref.
1998–2002	Una donna per amico	Margherita		
2000–2003	Casa famiglia	Leila		
2003	Cinecittà	Flaminia	2 episodes	
2003	Un medico in famiglia	Flaminia	1 episode	
2004	Amiche	Monica	Miniseries	
2004	Amanti e Segreti	Fiore Leonardi	2 episodes	
2004–2005	Incantesimo	Giada Donati	29 episodes	
2006	Distretto di Polizia	Martina	1 episode	
2006	Nati ieri	Aurora		
2007	La terza verità	Michela Giansanti	Television film	
2011	Don Matteo	Valeria Torre	1 episode	
2013	Fear of Loving	Carlotta	6 episodes	
2016	Rimbocchiamoci le maniche	Caty	8 episodes	
2017	Amore pensaci tu	Camilla Cordaro	20 episodes	
2018–2020	Skam Italia	Eleonora Sava	28 episodes	

=== Music videos ===
Year	Title	Artist	Role	Ref.
2019	"Rondini al guinzaglio"	Ultimo	Herself	
