= Federico Cesari =

Italian actor (born 1997)

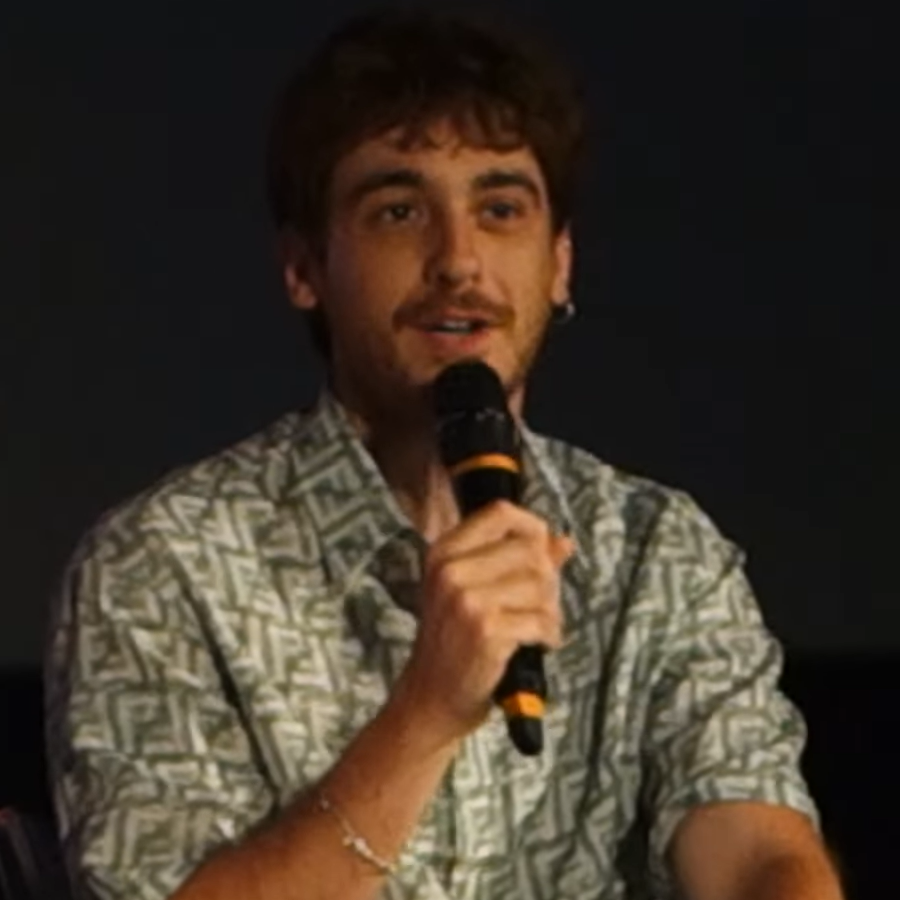
- Cesari in 2024
- Born: 5 March 1997 (age 29); Rome, Italy
- Occupation: Actor
- Years active: 2007–present

Federico Cesari (Italian pronunciation: [fedeˈriːko ˈtʃeːzari, - ˈtʃɛː-]; born 5 March 1997) is an Italian actor. He is best known for his roles as Martino Rametta in the teen drama series Skam Italia (2018–2024) and as Daniele Cenni in the Netflix drama series Everything Calls for Salvation (2022–2024).

== Biography ==
Cesari was born in Rome. He attended boarding school at the Convitto nazionale Vittorio Emanuele II. He began his acting career at the age of 10, and appeared in two Pupi Avati films: A Dinner for Them to Meet (2007) and The Youngest Son (2010). He took a break from acting from 2010 to 2017, but later resumed. Parallel to his acting career, he also attended medical school, graduating in 2023.

== Acting credits ==
=== Film ===
| Year | Title | Role | Notes | Ref. |
|---|---|---|---|---|
| 2007 | A Dinner for Them to Meet | | | |
| 2010 | The Youngest Son | | | |
| 2014 | The Dinner | Michele's acquaintance | | |
| 2017 | Non c'è campo | Massimo | | |
| 2020 | As in Heaven, So on Earth | Cris | | |
| 2021 | Dog Years | Matte | | |
| 2023 | L'ultima volta che siamo stati bambini | Vittorio | | |
| 2024 | Inside Out 2 | Embarrassment | Voice role; Italian dub | |
| 2025 | Zvanì - Il romanzo famigliare di Giovanni Pascoli | Giovanni Pascoli | | |
| 2026 | Greta e le favole vere | Nicola | | |
| TBA | Il ministero dell'amore | | | |

=== Television ===
| Year | Title | Role | Notes | Ref. |
|---|---|---|---|---|
| 2010 | I Cesaroni | Andy Di Stefano | 20 episodes | |
| 2010 | Tutti pazzi per amore | Tonino | Supporting role | |
| 2018 | Don Matteo | Lucio Volpe | 1 episode | |
| 2018–2024 | Skam Italia | Martino Rametta | 46 episodes | |
| 2020 | La guerra è finita | Gabriel | 4 episodes | |
| 2021 | Ritoccàti | Sergio | 6 episodes | |
| 2021 | Buongiorno, mamma! | Federico | 6 episodes | |
| 2022–2024 | Everything Calls for Salvation | Daniele | 12 episodes | |
| 2023 | Folle d'amore - Alda Merini | Arnoldo Mosca Mondadori | Television film | |

=== Theater ===
| Year | Title | Role | Theater | Ref. |
|---|---|---|---|---|
| 2024 | Magnifica Presenza | Pietro | Teatro Ambra Jovinelli | |

== Awards and nominations ==
| Award | Year | Category | Nominated work | Result | Ref. |
|---|---|---|---|---|---|
| Ciak d'Oro Serie TV | 2023 | Best Audience Protagonist Under 30 | Everything Calls for Salvation | Nominated | |
| David di Donatello | 2025 | Italian Rising Stars | | Won | |
| Monte-Carlo Film Festival de la Comédie | 2023 | Next Generation Award | Everything Calls for Salvation | Won | |
| Nastri d'Argento Grandi Serie | 2023 | Premio Biraghi-Serie | Everything Calls for Salvation | Won | |
| Nastri d'Argento Grandi Serie | 2023 | Premio Persol | Everything Calls for Salvation | Won | |
