= Fotinì Peluso =

Italian actress (born 1999)

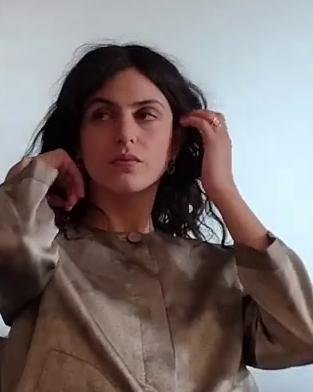
- Peluso in 2026
- Born: 1 January 1999 (age 27); Rome, Italy
- Occupation: Actress

Fotinì Peluso (born 1 January 1999) is an Italian film and television actress.

== Life and career ==
Born in Rome, Peluso is the daughter of an Italian father and a Greek mother. After getting a degree in economics from the Roma Tre University, she began studying acting with Mario Grossi.

After failing an audition for the film One Kiss, she made her official debut in 2018, in the Rai 1 series Romanzo famigliare. She made her film debut in 2020, in the film The Kingdom. She is best known for the Netflix series Everything Calls for Salvation, for which she won a Ciak d'oro and a Biraghi Award at the 2023 Silver Ribbons. Also in 2023, she received an 'Italian Rising Star' David di Donatello Award.

== Filmography ==
=== Film ===
Year	Title	Role(s)	Notes
2020	Il regno	Lisa	
2020	Under the Riccione Sun	Guenda	
2020	Everything's Gonna Be Alright	Adele	
2022	The Hummingbird	Irene Carrera	
2023	The Braid	Giulia	
2024	Dieci minuti	Jasmine Meola	
2025	Bare Hands	Eva	
2026	Non è la fine del mondo	Emma De Tessent	

=== Television ===
Year	Title	Role(s)	Notes
2017	Thou Shalt Not Kill	Sofia	Episode: "Episode 11"
2018	Romanzo famigliare	Micol Pagnotta	Main role
2019–2021	La Compagnia del Cigno	Barbara Severini	Main role
2021	Nudes	Sofia	3 episodes
2022–2024	Everything Calls for Salvation	Nina Marinelli	Main role
2023	Greek Salad	Giulia	Main role
2026	The Great Chimera	Marina	Main role
