= Infinity+ (Italy) =

Italian video streaming service

- Official logo
- Website type: Streaming media
- Available in: Italian
- Area served: Italy
- Founder: Mediaset
- Editor: RTI
- Products: TV programs
- Parent: Mediaset
- Website: mediasetplay.mediaset.it/infinity-plus
- Commercial: Yes
- Launched: December 11, 2013; 12 years ago
- Current status: Active

Infinity+ (formerly Infinity TV) is an Italian streaming platform published by RTI and owned by Mediaset.

Inside there is a section dedicated to the rental of films, cartoons, TV series and content also available in the original language, with subtitles and in 4K.

It is also available as an app for Android, iOS and for Smart TVs.

== History ==
=== Infinity TV ===
Infinity TV, launched on December 11, 2013, allows users to watch movies, dramas and TV series via streaming. Since July 2014, the service is also available via Chromecast and is included in the packages offered by Mediaset Premium. In July 2015, to an agreement with Tiscali, the service is included in the provider's connectivity offers. Since 1 September 2015, the Infinity price list is available free of charge to all Mediaset Premium "Cinema" package subscribers.

From 5 March 2015 to 12 January 2016, Infinity included a section entitled "Cinema Live" in which the Premium Cinema +24, Premium Cinema Emotion, Premium Cinema Energy and Premium Cinema Comedy channels were broadcast in live streaming. In December 2015, Infinity launched Première, i.e. a selection of very recently introduced films, available free of charge for one week to platform subscribers.

From 1 June 2018 the "Live Channels" section was introduced, where the linear cinema and series channels usable on Mediaset Premium are made available.

From the end of October 2019, streaming of the other Mediaset channels available free-to-air is also added (only for the Web) to the Live Channels section, with the exception of Mediaset Extra and the kids and music channels.

In November 2020 Mediaset launched Infinity Selection, an additional channel of Amazon Prime Video that offers some contents of the platform.

=== Infinity+ ===
On 8 April 2021, as announced last March, the platform is incorporated into Mediaset Play Infinity and renamed Infinity+.

Since August 2021, Infinity+ has offered 104 UEFA Champions League matches for three seasons: 8 play-offs matches and 96 matches from the group stage to the quarter-finals.

== Logos ==
Infinity TV 2013-2017

Infinity TV 2017-2021

Infinity+ 2021–present

== See also ==
- Mediaset
- Mediaset Group
- Mediaset Play Infinity
- Reti Televisive Italiane
