= Steel (TV channel) =

- Country: Italy
- Broadcast area: Italy

Programming
- Language: Italian
- Picture format: 576i (16:9 SDTV)

Ownership
- Owner: NBCUniversal

History
- Launched: 19 January 2008; 18 years ago
- Closed: 1 April 2013; 13 years ago
- Replaced by: Premium Action

Links
- Website: http://www.steeltv.it/

Availability (at time of closure)

Terrestrial
- Premium Gallery: DVB-T, LCN n/a (Steel)

Steel was an Italian entertainment TV channel, owned by NBCUniversal and broadcast on Premium Gallery, a Digital terrestrial television service in Italy.

== History ==
It started broadcasting on 19 January 2008 at 13:30 (CET Time).

It was aimed at a male audience and broadcast action and science fiction / fantasy TV series and movies with a branded block called Syfy (SciFi until 30 June 2011). At launch, it also carried the Italian premiere of the Warner Bros./Chuck Lorre sitcom The Big Bang Theory.

Steel was not available on satellite television and was not available outside Italy.

On 1 April 2013, Steel was shut down and replaced by Premium Action, which was entirely produced by Mediaset Premium, without NBCUniversal's collaboration.

== See also ==
- Mediaset Premium
