= Antonio Fortunato Stella =

Italian publisher and editor

Antonio Fortunato Stella (1757–1833) was an Italian publisher and editor, active in Northern Italy which for some of his life was in the Austrian Empire.

== Biography ==
He was born in Venice, but upon the fall of the Venetian Republic to the Napoleonic invasion he moved to Milan, where he began publication of Classici italiani. Among his works was a semi-autographical treatise complaining about the lack of copyright protection: Considerazioni di un vecchio libraio-stampatore sul sacro diritto della propieta letteraria e sull ingiustizia delle ristampe (1825, Milan). He published some of the works of his friend Giacomo Leopardi.
