= Daniele Mencarelli =

Italian writer (born 1974)

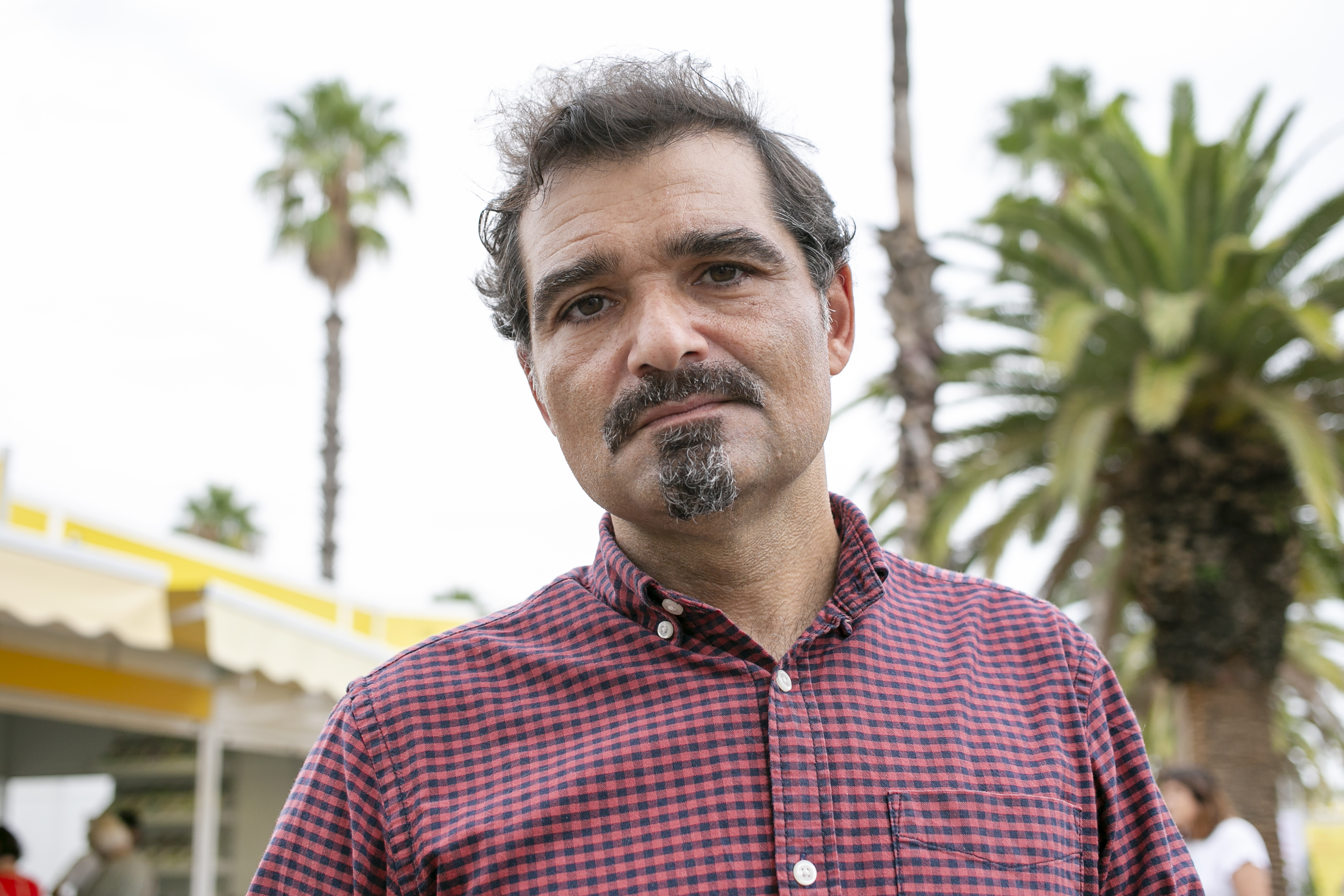
Daniele Mencarelli at the 2022 Catalan Book Week

Daniele Mencarelli (born 26 April 1974 in Rome) is an Italian writer. He is known both for his poetry and his fiction, primarily his autobiographical trilogy of novels. His titles include:

- Tempo Circolare (poetry)
- La casa degli sguardi (novel, 2018)
- Tutto chiede salvezza (novel, 2020)
- Sempre tornare (novel)

La casa degli sguardi, the first volume of the trilogy, won the Volponi prize, and the Severino Cesari and John Fante prizes for first book.

Tutto chiede salvezza, the second volume, won the Strega Giovani Award. It has also been made into a Netflix Original series in Italian.

Sempre tornare, the third volume, won the EU Prize for Literature.

The first two volumes have been published in English translation by Europa Editions. The titles, respectively, are The House of Gazes (translated by Octavian MacEwen) and Everything Calls for Salvation (translated by Wendy Wheatley).

In 2024, La casa degli sguardi has been made into an Italian film.
