= Mya (TV channel) =

- Country: Italy
- Broadcast area: Italy

Programming
- Language: Italian
- Picture format: 4:3/16:9 SDTV
- Timeshift service: Mya +1

Ownership
- Owner: Mediaset

History
- Launched: 18 January 2008
- Closed: 22 June 2015
- Replaced by: Premium Stories

Links
- Website: http://www.mediasetpremium.mediaset.it/canale/index_mya.shtml

Availability

Terrestrial
- Premium Gallery: LCN n/a (Mya)
- LCN n/a (Mya +1)

Mya was an Italian entertainment TV channel, owned by Mediaset and broadcast on Premium Gallery, a pay television network available on digital terrestrial television in Italy.

== History ==
Mya started its transmission on January 18, 2008 with the pilot episode of Gossip Girl.

It was targeted at female audiences and broadcasts movies, television series and soap operas.

Mya was not available on satellite television, and was not available outside Italy.

On 23 July 2015 Mya was replaced by Premium Stories, closing on 10 January 2022.

== See also ==
- Mediaset Premium
