= Mediaset Infinity (Italy) =

Italian video streaming service

- Official logo

- Screenshot of the Website circa 12 April 2021
- Website type: Streaming media
- Available in: Italian
- Area served: Italy
- Founder: Mediaset
- Editor: RTI
- Products: TV programs
- Parent: Mediaset
- Website: mediasetplay.mediaset.it
- Commercial: Yes
- Launched: July 15, 2007; 19 years ago
- Current status: Active

Mediaset Infinity (formerly Mediaset Play, then Mediaset Play Infinity) is an Italian streaming platform for viewing streaming content via the Internet, both live and on demand. The platform is published by RTI and owned by Mediaset.

It is also available as an app for Android, iOS and for Smart TVs with MHP or HbbTV technology.

== History ==
=== Background ===
The first Mediaset Website was activated in 1999 under the name Mediaset.it. Initially it was a television portal dedicated to Canale 5, Rete 4 and Italia 1. Over the years it has been extended to all Mediaset networks. It was possible to access the TV guide, the complete list of Mediaset programs and information on DTT coverage.

==== Rivideo ====
Rivideo was born in 2007. The service, as the name suggests, made it possible to review Mediaset dramas, videos, films, episodes of television series, cartoons and anime broadcast on Mediaset networks for a fee. It also allowed you to review the Serie A football matches.

==== Video Mediaset ====
Rivideo closed on 11 January 2010, leaving room for the updated version of the Video Mediaset catch-up TV. The latter introduces the possibility to follow live channels.

==== Mediaset On Demand ====
On 7 October 2015 Mediaset.it and Video Mediaset merged into Mediaset On Demand, which gave the possibility of following the channels live, watching programs already aired, and there are various sections dedicated to news, Web exclusives, film previews and interviews. There was also the Mediaset Fan app for smartphones and tablets, which allowed you to watch live programs or review reruns, the TV guide, and vote in reality shows via televoting. Since 29 March 2017, the platform has become a real video on demand service.

=== Mediaset Play ===
Mediaset Play was born on July 5, 2018, as the heir of Mediaset On Demand, also incorporating the sites of free television channels and introducing some new functions that are added to those already existing in the previous portal. One of these is "Restart", which allows you to review from the beginning the program that is airing at a given moment on a television channel of the group.

=== Mediaset Play Infinity ===
On December 2, 2020, the merger between Mediaset Play and Infinity TV was announced. On 5 March 2021 it was confirmed that the streaming service would change its name to Infinity+, while the entire platform would be renamed Mediaset Play Infinity. The rebranding took place on the following 8 April, with a relative update of the logo and, consequently, of the graphic interface.

On April 2, 2021, the launch of Toonami is announced, a network published by WarnerMedia dedicated to Japanese anime and aimed at a mainly adolescent audience. The channel will arrive on Infinity+ at a cost of 4.99 euros per month.

=== Mediaset Infinity ===
On May 17, 2021, the platform changed again its name and logo to Mediaset Infinity, keeping the same features.

In May 2025, Mediaset announced that the Spanish streaming platform Mitele would be renamed Mediaset Infinity, following its Italian counterpart, starting June 24.

== Logos ==
Video Mediaset 2010-2015

Mediaset On Demand 2015-2017

Mediaset On Demand 2017-2018

Mediaset Play 2018-2019

Mediaset Play 2019-2021

Mediaset Play Infinity 2021

Mediaset Infinity 2021–present

== See also ==
- Infinity+
- Mediaset
- Mediaset Group
- Reti Televisive Italiane
