= Mediaset Premium =

Italian subscription television platform

- Website type: Pay TV
- Available in: Italian
- Area served: Italy
- Founder: Mediaset
- Editor: Mediaset Premium S.p.A.
- Products: TV programs
- Parent: Mediaset
- Website: www.mediasetpremium.mediaset.it
- Commercial: Yes
- Launched: January 20, 2005; 21 years ago
- Current status: Closed down June 2019

Mediaset Premium was an Italian pay TV provider owned by Mediaset. Until closure in 2019, it provided subscription TV channels and pay-per-view events (only for football matches) via the Italian digital terrestrial television network through the use of a smart card as well as video-on-demand services through its "Premium Play" and "Premium Online" streaming service.

== History ==
Premium Cinema logo

Mediaset Premium was launched on January 20, 2005, initially offering only pay-per-view services for movies and sports. The first broadcast was held on January 22: a Serie A match between Inter and Chievo. Two weeks ahead of launch, almost all of the 280,000 smart cards were sold. However, one week ahead of its start, 17 decoder models did not display its signals. From June 2005, it also began offering pay-per-view TV shows, movies and broadcasts of Grande Fratello. Most American series premiered there before airing on Mediaset's terrestrial networks, particularly Italia 1, and most of the titles were from Warner Bros. Television.

On January 19, 2008, it became a full pay-TV platform, launching the "Premium Gallery" package, available, with a package for football matches, through monthly subscription or prepaid. For this end, three channels were launched: Joi, Mya and Steel (this last one launched in association with NBCUniversal, who offered its package of dubbed series).

Over time, new packages and new channels enrich the offer.

The first addition following the launch of the in-house channels was Disney Channel on July 1, 2008, already available on Sky packages. On December 8, a new package with children's channels was introduced, Premium Fantasy. This included Disney Channel, already on Premium Gallery, new entrants Playhouse Disney and Cartoon Network, and a new in-house channel, Hiro, specialized in anime.

In 2015, the new offering provides channels of movies, TV series, sport, documentaries, cartoons and interactive services Premium Play and Premium Online. From 2016, Premium will also broadcast on satellite TV. In October 2016, Disney Junior and Disney Channel ceased broadcasting, only remaining available on Sky.

Until 2018, with its parent, it held exclusive rights to the UEFA Champions League in Italy. It also owns the sports rights, in addition to the Serie A, of foreign tournaments such as Ligue 1 and the Coupe de France, the Scottish Premiership, and also the NFL of American football. Both Eurosport 1 and Eurosport 2 were also offered.

On 1 June 2018, Cartoon Network, Mediaset Premium's last kids' channel, ceased broadcasting, with the channel remaining available on Sky Italia.

In 2016 Vivendi agreed to buy 100% stake of Mediaset Premium and 3.5% stake of Mediaset by selling 3.5% stake of Vivendi's shares. However, after inspecting the financial statements as well as income forecast, Vivendi did not wish to enforce the original terms but submitting a revised offer to buy 20% stake in Mediaset Premium, as well as buying convertible bonds of Mediaset Premium. Fininvest, the majority owner of Mediaset, had chosen to start legal action to Vivendi.

In 2018, its offer was restructured to enable the entrance of Sky channels. The Sky TV package included Sky Uno, Sky Atlantic, FOX, National Geographic and Sky TG24 from Sky's behalf, and eight Mediaset film and TV series channels: Premium Action, Premium Crime, Premium Joi, Premium Stories, Premium Cinema, Premium Cinema Energy, Premium Cinema Emotion and Premium Cinema Comedy. The Sky Sport package featured two channels, Sky Sport 24 and Sky Sport 1 (the only sports channel in HD on the DTT offer).

The service was closed down in June 2019. Subscribers were allowed to rescind from the platform during the month of May, free of charge. From June 1, its channels were made available on Mediaset Infinity, its streaming service. The remaining Mediaset Premium channels that remained on Sky were shut down on January 10, 2022.

== Channels ==
The offer was divided into packages, available in prepaid or through monthly subscriptions.

Package	Channel number	Channel	Description
Service channels	300	Premium Menu	service
Service channels	301	Premium Play	service
Sky	311, 456	Sky Uno	entertainment
Sky	312, 457	Sky Atlantic	TV series
Sky	313, 458	Fox	TV series
Sky	314, 459	National Geographic	documentaries
Sky	468	Sky Sport Uno	sports
Sky	469	Sky Sport 24	sports news
Sky	470	Sky Sport Uno HD	sports (HDTV)
Series & Docs	316, 460	Premium Action	TV series
Series & Docs	317, 461	Premium Crime	TV series
Series & Docs	318, 462	Premium Joi	TV series
Series & Docs	319, 463	Premium Stories	TV series
Series & Docs	320	Investigation Discovery	documentaries
Cinema	330, 464	Premium Cinema	blockbuster movies
Cinema	331, 465	Premium Cinema Energy	action/crime movies
Cinema	332, 466	Premium Cinema Emotion	drama movies
Cinema	333, 467	Premium Cinema Comedy	comedy movies
Cinema	334	Studio Universal	classic/noir movies
Sports & Football	372	Eurosport 1	sports 24h
Sports & Football	373	Eurosport 2	sports 24h
Service channels	399	Premium Online	service

== Premium Play ==
Premium Play was a streaming service on PC, iPad, Android, Xbox One, Xbox 360 and Samsung Smart TV, Windows for subscription customers in conjunction with the TV packages.
