= Amparo Piñero =

Spanish actress, singer, dancer and model (born 1997)

- Born: Amparo Piñero Guirao; 13 December 1997 (age 28); Murcia, Spain
- Occupations: Actress; singer; dancer; model
- Years active: 2014–present
- Height: 1.65 m (5 ft 4.96 in)
- Website: Amparo Piñero; Amparo Piñero

Amparo Piñero Guirao (born 13 December 1997) is a Spanish actress, singer, dancer and model.

== Biography ==
Amparo Piñero was born on 13 December 1997, in Murcia (Spain). From an early age she showed an inclination for acting. Piñero is multilingual, speaking both Spanish and Italian.

== Career ==
Amparo Piñero trained at the Cristina Rota and Juan Codina schools and graduated in musical interpretation at the Superior School of Dramatic Art in Murcia. She completed her training in ballet and tap dance: Raquel Jiménez and contemporary dance and jazz with Susana Ruiz. She forged her acting beginnings in several works: El Misterio de Europa (as a screenwriter and actress), La Antología de la Zarzuela directed by Pepe Ros and La casa de Bernarda Alba, el musical directed by Michael John LaChiusa.

In 2021 and 2022, she played the role of Lola Ortega in the Italian Netflix television series Summertime and where she acted alongside actors Ludovico Tersigni, Coco Rebecca Edogamhe and Andrea Lattanzi.

In the same years, she was chosen to play the role of the protagonist Carmen Villanueva / Carmen Cruz in the telenovela broadcast on La 1 Two Lives (Dos vidas) and where she acted alongside actors such as Laura Ledesma, Sebastián Haro, Silvia Acosta and Iván Mendes.

In 2023 she was chosen to play the role of Martina de Luján y Llopis in the telenovela broadcast on La 1 La Promesa, together with the actors Ana Garcés, Eva Martín, Manuel Regueiro and Arturo Sancho. In the same year, she was included in the cast of the Prime Video series Los farad, along with actors such as Miguel Herrán, Susana Abaitua, Pedro Casablanc, Nora Navas and Fernando Tejero.

== Filmography ==
=== TV series ===
Year	Title	Role	Network	Episodes	Notas
2021–2022	Summertime	Lola Ortega	Netflix	15 episodes	Protagonist
2021–2022	Two Lives (Dos vidas)	Carmen Villanueva / Carmen Cruz	La 1	255 episodes	Protagonist
2023–present	La Promesa	Martina de Luján y Llopis	La 1	¿? episodes	Protagonist
2023	Los Farad		Prime Video	8 episodes	Protagonist

== Theater ==
Year	Title	Author	Director	Role
2009–2015	Member of the San Buenaventura Choir			
2014	El misterio de Europa			
2015	El Abadejillo	Luis Quiñones de Benavente	Joaquín Pérez	Catalina
2017	Miscelánea del amor y el dolor	Amadeo Vives y Guillermo Perrín y Vico	Pepe Ros	
2017	Bohemios			
2018	Las Brujas de Sälen			Ann Putnam
2018	Model at body painting show			
2018	La Antología de la Zarzuela		Pepe Ros	
2019	El Despertar, basada en Spring Awakening	Steven Sater	José Antonio Sánchez	Ilse y Anna
2019	La casa de Bernarda Alba, el musical	Michael John LaChiusa		Amelia
2019	Singer and actress in the Spanish opera company			
