= Kenai White =

Spanish musician, actor and model

- Born: 2001 (age 24–25)
- Occupations: Singer-songwriter, actor, music producer, composer, and activist
- Height: 1.64 m (5 ft 5 in)

Kenai White (Salamanca, 2001) is a Spanish singer-songwriter, actor, and music producer. He is known for his single “Soy Trans” and for playing the role of María/Dani Naranjo Prieto in the telenovela Dos vidas.

== Early life ==
Kenai White was born in 2001 in Salamanca, in the autonomous community of Castile and León, Spain

== Career ==
Kenai White started his career as a musician. In 2020, as part of the main cast of the soap opera Dos vidas, he was cast in the role of María Naranjo Prieto/Dani Naranjo Prieto, where he starred alongside actors such as Laura Ledesma, Cristina de Inza, Aída de la Cruz, Oliver Ruano, Miguel Brocca, Gloria Camila Ortega, Mario García and Álex Mola.

In 2022, he starred in the short film Desviación típica, directed by Paco Ruiz, in which he played the role of River.

== Filmography ==
=== Film ===
Year	Title	Role	Notes
2022	Desviación típica	River	Short film

=== Television ===
Year	Title	Role	Notes
2020	Indetectables	River	
2021-2022	Dos vidas	Dani Naranjo Prieto	255 episodes

== Discography ==
Year	Album/Singles	Type
2021	Soy Trans	Single
2021	Disforia	Single
2022	Ave Rapaz	Single
2022	Despierta	Single
2022	Navío	Single
2023	Gigantes de Hielo	Single
2023	Seres Nocturnos	Single
2023	Lilas Azules	Single
2023	Ilusión	Single
2023	Lluvia	Single
2023	Maravillas	Single
