= Slam (novel) =

2007 novel by Nick Hornby

- First edition
- Author: Nick Hornby
- Language: English
- Publisher: Puffin (UK); Putnam (US)
- Publication date: 2007
- Publication place: United Kingdom
- Media type: Print (Hardback and Paperback)
- Pages: 309 pp
- ISBN: 0-14-132140-7
- OCLC: 183915453

Slam is a novel written by British author Nick Hornby, published in 2007. The book's main theme is teenage pregnancy and it is written from the perspective of a teenager, Sam.

The book has a Fantasy element: The protagonist repeatedly has prophetic dreams in which he is projected months or years forward into his future, finding himself in a radically different life situation and having to piece out how his life has changed (or is going to change) - without letting the people around his future self notice his ignorance.

== Summary ==
The novel's protagonist is a troubled 16-year-old skateboarder, Sam, who lives in London, UK . His mother, Annie, gave birth to him when she was just 16. They therefore have an unconventional relationship. He has a poster of Tony Hawk in his room that serves as his friend and confidant. Sam's two best friends are Rabbit and Rubbish, two skateboarders. Sam's father, Dave, is somewhat estranged from the family, visiting them only occasionally. After being introduced to Alicia at a party thrown by Annie's co-worker, Andrea, Sam and Alicia start dating. He believes he is in love with her and visits her numerous times, almost daily, in which they have sex several times. However, one time Sam and Alicia try having sex not wearing protection. Sam knows that due to him having sex with Alicia without a condom, she might be pregnant. He's just not ready to be a father.

After a while, Sam gets bored of his relationship and decides to break up. A while later, Alicia calls him to meet so they can talk. Sam, realizing what news she has, has a prophetic dream of waking up next to Alicia in the future. She is ugly and heavy, and their baby, Roof, is loud and obnoxious. He attends the local college occasionally throughout the week, pursuing a career in art and design. Moreover, Annie is pregnant. Sam awakens the next morning. He is back to his normal time and presumes that he was sent in the future by the mystical powers of his Tony Hawk poster.

In fear of the obvious news that Alicia will give him, he runs away to Hastings and throws his mobile phone in the sea. Thinking he can make a permanent residence there, Sam goes to several attractions, only to be told there is no work. While in a seedy bed and breakfast, Sam meets a rude old man, Mr Brady, that hires him as a helper with various day-to-day activities (helping him up and down the stairs, and retrieving his remote control). In the middle of the night, Mr Brady barges into his room demanding he helps him find the remote that has fallen behind his bed. Sam grudgingly retrieves it, only to decide that he no longer wants to stay in the town.

He returns home to Annie who has called the police. After spending some time with Annie, Sam and Alicia meet up and she reveals that she is in fact pregnant. Refusing to get an abortion, Alicia and Sam work up the nerve to tell Alicia's elitist parents, Andrea and Robert. Originally upset, Andrea and Robert try to convince Alicia to have an abortion. When Alicia refuses, Andrea and Robert lash out and blame Sam for ruining Alicia's life. Sam, Alicia, Andrea and Robert march over to Sam's apartment, only to find Annie with her new boyfriend Mark. When told of the pregnancy, Annie breaks down and cries, furious that Sam would ruin his life.

That night, Sam has another prophetic dream in which he takes Roof (the name, he finds, being a contraction of Rufus) to a doctor's appointment. Again, Sam has no idea how to take care of Roof and no idea what is going on. Sam upsets his son Rufus, and he again, realizes he is not a suitable father. Fortunately, he meets with a young mother - whom he does not know, but who seems to know him - and gets her to show him how to change Roof's diapers, though she says "But you are very good at doing it". When waking up he realizes that, like it or not, he is going to have a life of taking care of his son. Gradually, he gets used to the idea.

As soon as Mark moves into their house, Annie becomes pregnant. Sam moves into Alicia's house only to find that he really isn't welcome there. He begins to take part-time college classes. He encounters one of Alicia's previous boyfriends who insinuates that Sam's son Rufus is actually his. He confronts Alicia when he believes that she conveniently made it look like it was his child - which she angrily disproves, but the scene adds to spoiling their relationship.

He moves back into his mother's apartment, resulting in him researching the internet for facts about teenage pregnancies. He discovers that four out of five male teenage parents lose contact with their children. He goes to Alicia's and begins to row with Alicia, resulting in her thinking he is seeing another girl. Eventually Alicia's parents clear the matter up.

When Alicia's time comes, Sam is very confused, but eventually does manage in a credible way the role of being at her side. He then finds out the origin of the baby's name - when recovering from birth-giving Alicia was listening to Rufus Wainwright. It was Sam himself who changed it to "Roof". Soon afterwards, Sam's mother gives birth to a daughter, Emily - who is strictly Roof's aunt, though being a month younger than him. Sam gets involved in taking care of Emily, too.

Soon after this Sam and Alicia take Rufus out for the day with Alicia and Sam having sex later. Alicia's mum discovers them and gets particularly angry. Sam and Alicia finally confirm to each other they were from the beginning wrong for each other.

Then Sam has a third prophetic dream, presumably a few years in the future. He wakes up with a beautiful girl he doesn't know. It is revealed she is his current girlfriend, Alex, as Alicia and he broke up. The two go to meet Alicia and her new boyfriend, Carl, in a restaurant. It is made clear that Alicia is the primary caretaker of the baby, but that she and Sam still have a friendly relationship.

== Southampton's Reading Slam ==
In Southampton, 800 copies of the book were freely distributed throughout the city. A message inside the specially printed books' front covers encouraged residents to "take me, read me, discuss me and then pass me on and then wait till it comes."

== Audiobook ==
Slam is available on unabridged audiobook, read by Nicholas Hoult.

== Film adaptations ==
Slam – Tutto per una ragazza, an Italian film adaptation of the novel, debuted at the Torino Film Festival in November 2016 and was released in Italy on 23 March 2017. The film is directed by Andrea Molaioli and stars Jasmine Trinca, Ludovico Tersigni, Barbara Ramella, and Luca Marinelli. Netflix acquired the global rights to the film and released it on 15 April 2017 on its platform worldwide except in Italy.

In 2022, a Brazilian adaptation of Slam was released entitled Derrapada, directed by Pedro Amorim.
