= Los 40 el Musical =

Los 40 el Musical is a Spanish jukebox musical, inspired by Cadena SER's Los 40 Principales, with a book by Daniel Sánchez Arévalo. The show's music is drawn from songs that have been in Spain's Top 40. The show debuted in Spain in October 2009, and in Mexico in 2018.

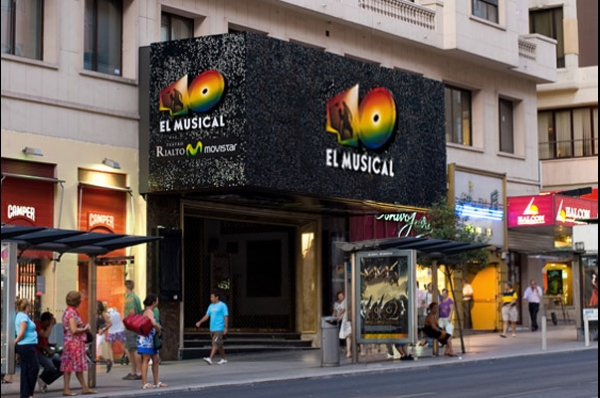
Show front for 40 El Musical

== Premise ==
The show follows the lives of a group of young people, as told by Joaquin, a radio DJ and blogger. He and his friends are in their twenties and are learning to let go of their teenage struggles and forge their own paths in life. Fights with their parents, sexual encounters, and music shape their lives. Chema and Laura are a couple who decide to remain abstinent until marriage. David and Alex are twin brothers who, although financially stable, have a difficult relationship with their father, Arturo. Joaquin, his close friend Mateo, and teacher Sara are caught in a love triangle.

== Cast ==
Role	2009 Madrid	2010 Barcelona	2013 Madrid	2018 Mexico City
Joaquín	Adrián Lastra	Naím Thomas	Javier Godino	Alejandro Nones, Luja Duhart (alternate)
Mateo	Pablo Puyol	Carlos J. Benito	Jaime Zarataín	Faisy, Raul Sandoval (alternate)
Sara	Susan Martín	Gisela	Silvia Álvarez	Fran Meric
Chema	Armando Pita	Toni Viñals	Alejandro Vera	Roberto Romano, Alberto Collado (alternate)
Laura	María Blanco		Marta Torres	Alex Garza, Kristel Fabre (alternate)
David	Xavi Duch	Josep Palau	Xavi Melero	Ruben Branco
Álex	Sandra Cervera		Cristina Rueda	Melissa Galindo
Arturo	Gerardo González	Gerardo González	Rodrigo Poisón	Gerardo González

=== Notable replacements ===
2009 Madrid:

- Pablo Puyol was replaced by William Miller on December 14, 2010
- Susan Martín was replaced by Gisela

== Productions ==
The show premiered in Madrid on 15 October, 2009. Miquel Fernández directed the production, set design was by Ana Garay, and choreography by Noemí Cabrera. In Barcelona the show premiered at the Teatro Victoria on September 9, 2010. Both productions finished their runs in May 2011 and began a national tour.

In November 2011 the show performed in Granada. In January 2013 it finished its tour in Spain and prepared to tour in Argentina.

The Mexican production of the musical, Los 40, premiered on February 8, 2018, at the Foro Cultural Chapultepec in Mexico City. It was produced by Faisy and directed by Ricardo Díaz, with set design by Cecilia Márquez and choreography by Neisma Ávila. The show was the stage debut for Fran Meric's husband, Raul Sandoval. The production toured in Mexico until September 2018, with their final performances in Guadalajara.

== Songs ==
=== Spanish productions ===
1. Overture
2. Every Breath You Take (The Police)
3. Llamando a la tierra (M Clan)
4. Crazy (Aerosmith)
5. Sin ti no soy nada (Amaral)
6. Bienvenidos (Miguel Rios)
7. Super Superman (Miguel Bosé)
8. Venezia (Hombres G)
9. Me voy (Julieta Venegas)
10. A Dios le Pido (Juanes)
11. Oops!... I Did It Again (Britney Spears)
12. Besos (El Canto Del Loco)
13. Medley - Loco (Andrés Calamaro)
14. Sin Miedo a Nada (Álex Ubago)
15. Nada fue un error (Coti)
16. La Chica de Ayer (Nacha Pop)
17. Tenía tanto que darte (Nena Daconte)
18. Siete vidas (Antonio Flores)
19. I Gotta Feeling (Black Eyed Peas)
20. Vivir sin aire (Maná)
21. ¿Quién Me Ha Robado El Mes De Abril? (Joaquín Sabina)
22. Amante bandido (Miguel Bosé)
23. Un beso y una flor (Nino Bravo)
24. Agua (Jarabe De Palo)
25. Medley Despedida De Solteros
26. Dulce Locura (La Oreja de Van Gogh)
27. Vivir así es morir de amor (Camilo Sesto)
28. Corazón Partío (Alejandro Sanz)

=== Mexican production ===
The list of songs varies from its original Spanish version, as it was based on the songs that have hit number one on the Top 40 in Mexico.

1. Bienvenidos (Miguel Ríos)
2. Tu falta de querer (Mon Laferte)/Laura no está (Nek)
3. Brillas (León Larregui)/Mis ojos lloran por ti (Big Boy)
4. Atrévete-te-te (Calle 13)
5. Perdóname (All by Myself) (Luis Miguel)
6. Las flores (Café Tacuba)
7. Creo en ti (Reik)
8. Visite nuestro bar (Hombres G)/Las de la Intuición (Shakira)/Cuando nadie me ve (Alejandro Sanz)
9. ¡Corre! (Jesse & Joy)
10. Todos Me Miran (Gloria Trevi)
11. Mundo de caramelo (Danna Paola)
12. Ángel (Yuridia)
13. Noreste Caliente (A Band of Bitches)
14. La bicicleta (Shakira and Carlos Vives)/Me equivoqué (Mariana Seoane)
15. Color Esperanza (Diego Torres)

== Cast album ==
A cast album was released in November 2011, that contained both the original number one hits and the versions performed in the show.

Songs included on the cast album which are not performed in the show include:

- Las de la Intuición (Shakira)
- Déjame (Los Secretos)
- Todo (Pereza)
- Cien gaviotas (Duncan Dhu)
- Eternal Flame (Bangles)
- Music (John Miles)
- Jailhouse Rock (Elvis Presley)
- Bette Davis Eyes (Kim Carnes)
- Salta!!! (Tequila)
- Cuando nadie me ve (Alejandro Sanz)
- Cuando tu vas (Chenoa)
- No Ordinary Love (Sade)
- Dime Que Me Quieres (Banda el Recodo)
- Ella Es Un Volcán (La Unión)
- Let Me Out (Dover)
- Soy Yo (Marta Sánchez)

A cast album for the Mexican production was released on 16 March, 2018 and contains only performances from the show, and contains only performances from the show.
