= Irene Cruz =

Spanish photographer and video artist

- Born: 1987 (age 38–39); Madrid, Spain
- Known for: Photography, video
- Website: www.irenecruz.com

Irene Cruz is a photographer, director of photography and video artist. She is fully dedicated to photography in various fields: video art, cinema, as well as teaching. Her works have been presented in festivals, fairs and also, individual/group exhibitions around the world, as at the Paris' Tokyo Palais, Círculo de Bellas Artes or the Palacio de Cibeles (Madrid, Spain), The KunstHalle or the Deutsche Oper (Berlín), Project Art Space (Nueva York), Museo de la Universidad de Alicante (MUA) (Alicante, Spain) or Da2 (Salamanca, Spain). She currently lives in Berlin, Germany, where she takes advantage of the closeness to nature and the light of the north to incorporate them into her work.

== Biography and education ==
She received a double degree from the Universidad Complutense de Madrid in Advertising and Public Relations, and Audiovisual Communication. She then completed the EFTI international master's degree, specializing in Conceptual Photography and Artistic Creation in 2011. In 2013, thanks to a scholarship, she took a specialized course on cinematographic narrative lighting (cinematographic photography direction) at the same center.

After finishing her studies, Irene Cruz began her professional career as a photographer, developing a style centered on the mysterious, private and natural, with light being a very important factor in her work. Later, she also began to work as a video artist, focusing on video as a moving image, maintaining a style very similar to her photography. Later, in 2017, she lensed her first feature film as director of photography of Diana (Alejo Moreno, starring Ana Rujas and Jorge Roldán), which premiered at the Malaga Film Festival 2018, and which has been screened at various festivals and venues in Spain, Germany, USA, Poland, etc.

Irene Cruz has also participated in various fairs such as ARCO or Art Madrid, Positions (Berlin), Art Basel, Photo Basel. In April 2017 she was the guest artist and image of the Photography Festival La Quatrieme Image in Paris and at Photoespaña (Madrid).

She has taught in schools such as EFTI or TMF (Madrid) in ABBE Geneva (Switzerland) Art von Frei, FotoKlubKollektiv or Unicorn (Berlin), Fiftydots or ACLAM in Barcelona . She also teaches this subject at Freie Universität in Berlin or at UAL in London. Among her mentors, Isabel Muñoz stands out (she was his Assistant in 2018 / 2019 in one of her trips to Japan). Eduardo Rodríguez Merchán (Professor at the Complutense University of Madrid) and Venancio Blanco (Artist).

Since December 2019, she is part of the national association AEC (Spanish Association of Directors of Photography) and CIMA (Association of Women Filmmakers and Audiovisual Media) and in Berlin she is part of the organization of Stammtisch Women in Cinema Berlin as well as active member of the collective The Women+ Film Network Berlin. As Director of Photography, in addition to "Diana" (Fiction, Alejo Moreno, 101 min, 2018) she has been the DOP of "Hechos Probados" (series of 3 chapters of 60 min each + 1 feature film, TBD, 2020) although she has also made several video clips, advertising campaigns (the last one she directed entirely for Levis, both graphic and audiovisual), video art pieces (highlighting her work at the Deutsche Oper 2014, 2016) and short documentaries.

== Awards ==
- Accesit of Fototalentos of the Fundación Banco Santander in 2010.
- Second Prize for Photography AENA Foundation.
- First prize in the II CFC ‐ Iberdrola Photography Contest in 2014.
- Best Video Art piece of 2014 by the international platform Elmur.net.
- Emerging artist with more international projection by the specialized jury of Why on White.
