= Two Lives (TV series) =

Spanish soap opera

- Spanish: Dos vidas
- Genre: Soap opera; Drama
- Based on: an original idea by Josep Cister Rubio
- Starring: Amparo Piñero; Laura Ledesma
- Country of origin: Spain
- Original language: Spanish
- No. of seasons: 1
- No. of episodes: 255

Production
- Production locations: Community of Madrid, Tenerife
- Production companies: RTVE; Mascaret Films; Bambú Producciones

Original release
- Network: La 1
- Release: 25 January 2021 – 8 February 2022

Two Lives (Spanish: Dos vidas) is a Spanish soap opera television series based on an original idea by Josep Cister Rubio that began airing on 25 January 2021 on La 1. It tells the story of two women in two different timelines: current-day Spain and 1950s colonial Spanish Guinea.

== Premise ==
The plot follows two women in two different timelines: Julia (a 30-year-old woman in current-day Spain who has inherited a house in the mountains from her father) and her grandmother Carmen, who lands in 1950s Equatorial Guinea, then a Spanish colony.

== Cast ==
- Amparo Piñero es Carmen
- Laura Ledesma es Julia
- Cristina de Inza es Diana
- Sebastián Haro es Francisco
- Oliver Ruano es Tirso
- Aída de la Cruz es Elena
- Miguel Brocca es Sergio
- Kenai White es María
- Gloria Camila Ortega es Cloe
- Chema Adeva es Mario
- Mario García es Ribero
- Silvia Acosta es Patricia
- Iván Mendes es Kiros
- Boré Buika es Mabale
- Jon López es Víctor
- Bárbara Oteiza es Inés
- Iván Lapadula es Ángel
- Iago García es Ventura
- Esperanza Guardado es Linda
- Mar Vidal es Agustina
- Elena Gallardo es Alicia
- Edith Martínez Val es Enoa

== Production ==
Based on an original idea by Josep Cister Rubio, Dos vidas is produced by RTVE and Mascaret Films in collaboration with Bambú Producciones. Shooting began in October 2020, taking place in between the Anaga Rural Park in Tenerife and the Madrid region. The fictional village of 'Robledillo de la Sierra' is portrayed by the actual municipalities of Chapinería and Colmenar del Arroyo.

== Release ==
Developed as replacement for Mercado Central in the early afternoon slot, the series began airing on 25 January 2021. TVE temporarily interrupted the airing of the series in August 2021 because of the broadcasting of the 2021 Vuelta a España. In October 2021, in the wake of the unimpressive viewership ratings, RTVE decided not to renew the series for a second season. This left the broadcasting of the series a margin until a presumed ending date by February 2022 to close the different subplots. The series finale was scheduled for 8 February 2022.

Year	Award	Category	Nominee(s)	Result	Ref.
2021	60th Rose d'Or Entertainment Programming Awards	Best Soap or Telenovela		Won	
2022	50th International Emmy Awards	Best Telenovela		Nominated	
