= El secreto de Puente Viejo =

Spanish telenovela

- Genre: Soap opera Period drama
- Created by: Aurora Guerra
- Written by: Aurora Guerra; Miquel Peidró; Félix J. Velando; Susana Prieto; Benjamín Zafra
- Directed by: Aurora Guerra; José Picaporte; Alberto Pernet
- Creative directors: Costume Design: Zulma Velázquez; Art Direction and Decoration: Coque Gordo
- Starring: Megan Montaner; Loreto Mauleón; Adriana Torrebejano; Raúl Peña; Almudena Cid; Álvaro Morte; Silvia Marsó; Lucía Caraballo; Jaime Lorente; Andrés Suárez; Ramón Ibarra; Leonor Martín; María Bouzas; Romeo Florin Sava alternate; Álex Gadea; Jordi Coll; Carlos Serrano; Sandra Cervera; Fernando Coronado; Mario Zorrilla; Maribel Ripoll; Selu Nieto; José Gabriel Campos; César Capilla; Alejandro Vergara; Adrián Expósito; Arantxa Aranguren; Roser Tapias; Toni Salgado; Paula Ballesteros; Iván Montes; Adrián Pedraja; Manuel Regueiro; Laura Minguell; Sara Sanz; Berta Castañé; Ángel Héctor Sánchez; Carles Sanjaime; Victoria Camps Medina; Aída de la Cruz; Ariadna Gaya; Ángel de Miguel; Yara Puebla; Giulia Charm; Ruth Llopis; Claudia Galán; Rubén Bernal; José Milán; Trinidad Iglesias; Rebeca Sala; María Lima; Ibrahim Al Shami J.; Alejandra Meco; Alejandro Sigüenza; Carlota Baró; Chico García
- Theme music composer: Alex Conrado
- Opening theme: "El secreto de Puente Viejo"
- Country of origin: Spain
- Original language: Spanish
- No. of seasons: 12
- No. of episodes: 2324

Production
- Executive producers: Luis Santamaría; Alberto Pernet
- Producers: Production Director: M. A. Caballero Brid; Production Manager: Álex Moreno
- Cinematography: Pablo Guerrero
- Editor: Paloma Trabada
- Running time: 55 minutes (approx.)
- Production company: Boomerang TV for Antena 3

Original release
- Network: Antena 3
- Release: 23 February 2011 – 20 May 2020

El secreto de Puente Viejo (English: The Secret of Puente Viejo) was a Spanish soap opera produced by Boomerang TV that originally aired from 23 February 2011 to 20 May 2020 on Antena 3.

== Synopsis ==
=== First season (Pepa, la partera) ===
The story begins in 1902, with Pepa, a poor and illiterate but intelligent adolescent orphaned girl with great knowledge in herbal medicine and obstetrics. Pepa had been lusted over and impregnated by her landlord Carlos Castro, giving birth to a son and then thrown out of the house and tricked into believing that her child was stillborn. She finds a shelter in Raimundo Ulloa (Ramón Ibarra) inn where she befriends his daughter Emilia and is hired to be an obstetrician for Francisca Montenegro (María Bouzas), a wealthy landlady whose pregnant daughter-in-law Angustias is mentally unstable. Both Angustias and Francisca begin hating Pepa when Francisca's son Tristán falls in love with Pepa. Pepa holds the blame for Angustias' baby's death while actually, the real culprit is Angustias herself. Eventually, the truth is revealed and the latter is sent to a mental institution where she commits suicide. Later, Pepa finds out that Tristan's adopted son Martín is her long-lost son, taken away by Carlos who was Tristán's adopted brother, who later died in a fire with all his household. However, he is revealed to have survived and returns, kidnapping his son. The villagers find out that Carlos is dead but do not find the child and consider him also dead. Pepa finds her real mother, a wealthy landlady who was forced to give her illegitimate newborn child away, as she was also underage, and her father is Francisca's deceased husband. It is also revealed that Raimundo and Francisca were lovers and Tristan is their son, so he's not Pepa's brother. After many trials, Pepa and Tristan finally get married and their daughter Aurora is born. Unfortunately, Pepa has a difficult pregnancy and dies in childbirth. When she learns that Tristán has been kidnapped while travelling, Pepa goes searching for him. Tristán manages to escape the goons and meets Pepa in the mountains near Puente Viejo. There, Pepa delivers with the help of Tristan but is very weak and unable to get up. After a tearful farewell, Tristan takes the newborn to the village.

=== Second season (La verdad de Gonzalo) ===
in 1919, Gonzalo (Jordi Coll), the new priest, comes to the town with a single purpose, to find his real family, it is Martín, the son of Pepa and Carlos who they left for dead in the first stage, he fell in love with María, raised in her godmother Francisca's home, has grown up to be a noble lady from the upper class who becomes a love interest of Fernando (Carlos Serrano) Pepa's step-brother's son, named Olmo and soon they get engaged. Meanwhile, Tristan is depressed after Pepa's demise, and does not communicate with anybody, except for his father Raimundo, his sister Emilia, his niece María, his brother-in-law Alfonso and his maidservant Rosario. He did not want to look after Aurora, as she reminded him of Pepa and sent her to a boarding school in Switzerland when she was 7 years old. Candela (Aída de la Cruz), a lonely confectioner who escaped her cruel husband, enters Tristan's life, making him happy again and they fall in love. It is revealed that Gonzalo is Pepa's long-lost son Martín and he reunites with his family. However, he finds out about Fernando's cruel and violent and together with Maria's adoptive aunt and maidservant of the Montenegros Mariana tries to stop his wedding with María but fails. Fernando, who's madly jealous, molests his wife before and after marriage and Martín is determined to save her. Tristán finds out that Francisca killed Pepa by getting her poisoned during pregnancy and disowns his mother.

=== Third season (La familia unida) ===
Meanwhile, Aurora (Victoria Camps Medina) returns after graduating boarding school and Candela helps Tristán making up with his daughter. It turns out the girl is not Aurora, but her friend Jacinta who got mad and stole the real Aurora's life, sending her to India. The real Aurora (Ariadna Gaya) manages to return and with the help of Martín and María exposes Jacinta who flees. Tristán reunites with his children but his happy living ever after is turned into a tragic end when Jacinta returns and murders him on his wedding with Candela. Before his wedding, Tristán decides to forgive Francisca and reconcile with his mother, but she refuses. After the wedding, Jacinta shoots Candela, but the projectile hits Tristán, who was hugging her, and he dies. Francisca visits his grave and cries in pain for the loss of her son.

=== Fourth season (Los hermanos contra Francisca) ===
After the unsuccessful attempted murder of Candela which was Jacinta's purpose in the first place, Jacinta flees again and poisons Puente Viejo's water supplies, causing a mortal epidemics. Martin and Aurora manage to get the antidote and save the village but Jacinta ends up committing suicide in a furious rage after realising her deeds. It is revealed that after Tristán left dying Pepa in the mountains taking newborn Aurora to the village, Pepa woke up, delivered Aurora's fraternal twin Bosco and was dragged by somebody after losing cautious again. Tristán never found her corpse. It is also never revealed what really happened to her. She gave the second baby to a random woman passing by.

After Fernando's numerous unsuccessful attempts to kill Martin, who is expecting a child with Maria, he injures himself badly end ends up in a wheelchair. Martín and María look after him until his recovery in exchange for a divorce. Fernando does not keep his word and kidnaps María and Martín's daughter, Esperanza, but eventually, all his crimes are caught and he is sent to jail. However, Francisca turns against María when she finds out about the latter's pregnancy and plans to get rid of her goddaughter and take the child from her. Having given priesthood up, Martín marries María. After Francisca's unsuccessful plot to murder Martin, Maria gets furious and tries to kill her godmother to put an end to her evil and cruel deeds but is stopped by Martín. To protect their daughter Esperanza, Martín and María enact their death with the help of their relatives and escape abroad. They live happily ever after in Cuba with Esperanza.

=== Fifth season (El chico de los tres lunares) ===
Francisca takes Bosco under her patronage after he saves her life and eventually his origins are revealed due to three moles on his back, possessed by Pepa and all her descendants. Bosco and Ines, Candela's niece who works as a maid in Montenegro Mansion, fall in love but Francisca gets Bosco married to a woman from the upper class named Amalia. However, Ines falls pregnant with Bosco's child. Amalia, who is childless, also fakes pregnancy and when Inés gives birth, she steals the latter's child telling her it died after birth and presenting it as her own. At the same time, Severo Santacruz (Chico García) arrives in the town accompanied by Carmelo Leal (Raúl Peña), his best friend, together they will be in charge of making Francisca pay for the death of Severo's parents since she killed them in the past. After Conrado's death, Aurora finds love in Lucas, but in the wedding she leaves him and travels to Paris.

=== Season six (El reencuentro de los mellizos) ===
Eventually, the truth is revealed and Inés reunites with her son and with Bosco. Amalia dies in an accident and Bosco and Ines get married. Unfortunately, Inés falls ill from diabetes and dies. Bosco is heartbroken but promises himself not to repeat his father's mistake. He hires a nanny for his son Beltran, Berta and soon they fall in love. But Berta turns out to be mental and attempts to kill Francisca when the latter tries to expose Berta's psychological state to Bosco. While protecting herself from Berta, Francisca inadvertently shoots Bosco and he dies. Bosco's last wish is for Beltran to be raised by Aurora. Initially, Francisca refuses to hand the baby over but then she decides not to repeat her mistake with Tristán and lets her love for Bosco triumph over her ego and hatred for Aurora. Severo and Carmelo devise a plan through which they make Francisca lose all her money and be forced to beg with Raimundo, her longtime love and Mauricio (Mario Zorrilla), her right hand and the only one who did not abandon her when she lost her money. Severo and Carmelo find Sol in Madrid, she is Severo's sister, employed as a prostitute and take her to Puente Viejo. Initially, Sol is scared and rebellious but soon manages to adapt to her new life, finding new friends in the village, like Doctor Lucas Moliner, who falls in love with her but their love has to go through some trials as it turns out Sol is married to her former employer Eliseo. After some twists and turns, Eliseo and Sol are divorced and she marries Lucas.

=== Seventh season (La época de Los Manantiales) ===
After Bosco's death, Aurora sells her home mansion to the Mella Family. But hardly soon arrived at the village, the Mellas tragically die in a fire accidentally caused by the family's children. Beatriz (Giulia Charm), the mute daughter of the family is the only survival. Hernando dos Casas, a wealthy but distanced landlord arrives at the village to be the girl's custodian. Soon after that, his wife Camila whom he has never seen, as they had married in different countries, he married to get custodian rights over Beatriz arrives from Cuba. Camila's character is her husband's complete opposite: she's kind and caring and soon wins her adopted daughter's heart over while Hernando provokes only fear in the girl despite his efforts of befriending her. Camila even manages to help Beatriz regain her voice. Elías Mato (Jaime Lorente), a chemist working for Hernando, falls in love with Camila and tries to separate her from her husband but eventually, the spouses grow closer to each other. As love between them arises, they have to overcome the misunderstandings created by Elías between them and learn how to trust each other. It is later revealed that Hernando is not the person he seems to be, he looks cold and heartless from the outside but is warm-hearted and caring from the inside. A tragedy had struck his life in the past that changed his manner: he had lost his family in a fire. However, one of his children survived: Beatriz, who had partly lost her memory and also her voice. She is scared from Hernando as he reminds her of the person who had set the fire. As Hernando had known somebody was plotting against him, he had sent his daughter to live with the Mellas, who were family friends of his, to protect her. As Camila finds out the truth, she proves Hernando's innocence in front of Beatriz and eventually the three of them live together like a real family. Later, the family faces new struggles as Beatriz is involved in a love triangle with Matías, Emilia's adopted son and Ismael, her father's new business partner.

Severo gives his revenge towards Francisca up, settles down in the village and marries Candela with whom he acquires a son named after his loyal friend Carmelo who also finds love and settles in the village.

Cristóbal Garrigues arrives to the town, he is one of the sons of Salvador Castro, and an army's intendant who has come to take revenge on Francisca for snatching her father's inheritance, since Francisca kept the inheritance of Salvador, but thanks to Severo and Carmelo they get the army to send Cristóbal to Morocco.

Sol dies when Severiano, the first love of Emilia, poisons her by mistake wanting to kill Alfonso, who was close to Sol. Emilia is guilty of murder, Severiano has returned to ask for money and go to America, but thanks to Maria's return, they get Severiano to die and for Emilia to leave the jail. Lucas marches desolate from the town with his son.

=== Eighth season (La sombra de Garrigues) ===
Matías, who loves Beatriz, is unreasonably jealous of Ismael who turns out to be Beatriz' long-lost brother Damiàn, who was taught to have died in the fire. But it is also revealed that Damian is evil and is the actual culprit for the fire and also for his mother's death. Damian repents for his past mistakes and asks his father for forgiveness. Hernando agrees, on condition Damián undergoes a psychotherapy. Damian seems to recover but his truly wicked intentions are revealed when he pushes Camila, who never trusted and so, investigated him, into a well. Camila, who's pregnant, survives but loses the child. Soon, Damián dies in an accident. Hernando does not succeed in saving his son and is heartbroken. Hernando and Camila's love is tested again when Camila's friend Lucía tries to stand between the two but it is strong enough to resist. The couple's happiness returns when Camila gets pregnant again.

Cristóbal returns to the town and now, he attacks Severo's family, almost got Candela abort the son son of Severo and they fake his dead and that of Severo. Cristóbal takes over Severo's house after his supposed death and Carmelo now is his esclave. Carmelo kills a man who was at enmity with Cristóbal, that man's widow, Adela (Ruth Llopis) and Carmelo fall in love without her knowing that it was Carmelo who killed her husband. Finally Severo is shown to be alive and he and Carmelo fight Cristóbal by kicking him out of the house. Francisca and Raimundo get married.

=== Season nine (Julieta y los hermanos Ortega) ===
In this stage, the protagonists of the soap opera are Julieta (Claudia Galán) and Saúl (Rubén Bernal). Saúl and his brother Prudencio (José Milán) save Francisca from Cristóbal Garrigues. Julieta arrives at Puente Viejo with her grandmother Consuelo (Trinidad Iglesias) and daughter Ana who's actually her half-sister, the reasons Julieta hides her identity are still unknown. Ana dies in a fire caused by Prudencio, who is dying of jealousy since his brother and Juliet are in love. Since then prudencio tries to separate Julieta and Saúl without success.

Matías mets Marcela (Paula Ballesteros), in a party and impregnate her, for that reason he is obliged to marry with her, that act brokes Beatriz's heart and she goes to bed with Aquilino to make Matias jealous. The financial situation of the Dos Casas has worsened a lot after the damage that Damián caused and after the departure of Lucía and the arrival of Aquilino, a man who wants to sink Hernando further, he receives a job offer and moves to Czechoslovakia with his family.

Carmelo and Adela married and Severo and Candela are back in the town, but Candela dies as her ex-mother-in-law, her first husband's mother comes to town and kills her, stealing baby Carmelo. Since then Severo tries to avenge the death of his wife and succeeds, but cannot find his son, it is revealed that the baby is in hiding with a journalist, Irene (Rebeca Sala), who unknowingly kept him . Severo and Irene fall in love and form a family with Carmelo and Adela, their soul friends.

Nicolás murders the son of a general since he killed his wife, Mariana, since then, said general hunts him and thanks to the help of the neighbors he manages to escape from the town, but the general attacks Emilia and Alfonso and they, after kill him they are in trouble.

=== Season ten (Fernando Mesía contraataca) ===
Fernando backs to the town to help Alfonso and Emilia with his problem, Francisca disappeared and Fernando takes over Francisca's house. Raimundo tries to find his wife but apparently, She doesn't want to be found. Antolina (María Lima) and Isaac (Ibrahim Al Shami) arrive at the town, Isaac was Elsa Laguna (Alejandra Meco) fiancé, they were going to get married when some terrorists broke into the wedding and faked Elsa's death, Antolina is Elsa's maid who managed to escape alive together with Isaac, together they make life in Puente Viejo. Later it is revealed that Elsa is still alive but locked up by her own brother, she manages to escape and reach Puente Viejo, there to deal with Antolina, who is in love with Isaac and they form a love triangle. Prudencio tries to kill Saúl, Saúl pretends to be dead and Julieta and Prudencio go to La Casona to live with Fernando and Raimundo, leaving Julieta's house to Elsa and Isaac. Meanwhile, Raimundo finds Francisca in a mental hospital, she is damaged mentally, he is locked up in the sanatorium by Fulgencio, Francisca's cousin, Fulgencio and Fernando agreed to lock up Francisca to steale Francisca's properties. Fortunately, Mauricio, Saúl, Fernando and Prudencio go to rescue Francisca and Raimundo and Fernando shoots at Fulgencio killing him so that Fulgencio could not reveal that the real villain was Fernando. At home, Francisca is still in a catatonic state, so when there was not much vigilance an outlaw sneaks in and pretends to kill her, that outlaw is Gonzalo, who has returned to fake Francisca's death in a plan concocted with Raimundo, make Fernando believe that she is dead in order to unmask Fernando. One month after Gonzalo's return, María returns, who is about to divorce Gonzalo, Gonzalo returns to Cuba with the money that Fernando has given him so that Gonzalo leaves María and that he has a chance with María.

=== Eleventh season (Santacruz, el desafortunado) ===
Spain in 1926. Severo Santacruz has overcome the problems arising from the mine and is now about to reap what has been sown, but the market fluctuations jeopardize all his resources. Indebted and enraged, he knows that Francisca is the black hand that led to his downfall. On the verge of starting a war between them, he is one of the two guilty of the other's misfortunes.

Prudencio now takes care of the wine cellar, and also hires an employee, Antonio Marchena. In addition, the boy also manages money loans, and finds himself helping Lola, a peasant who owns a farm in the town: in short, the two fall in love. Antonio Marchena leaves after finding a job near where he used to live, because he betrayed Prudencio by serving Francisca. Only Prudencio and Lola take care of the wine cellar, but when Prudencio discovers that Lola is also in the service of Montenegro, he fires her. The latter finds work at the Castañeda inn, but Prudencio misses her and forgives her and she returns to work with him.

Meanwhile, Fernando is back with his new girlfriend, María Elena. with which he marries. But during their marriage, a bomb planted by Fernando explodes to take revenge on Francisca, but his plan fails and it is María Elena who dies, while Matías risks losing an eye and María is on the verge of being paralyzed. Mesía will take all his wife's inheritance. Esperanza and Beltrán are forced to leave for a boarding school due to the dangerous situation that is being caused in the village, between the hatred between Francisca against Severo and Carmelo.

Isaac and Elsa are together in the same house but Antolina denounces Elsa of adultery and then has her arrested. Elsa in prison is beaten by Rufina, her cellmate and an accomplice of Antolina. Elsa is released from prison and Antolina is forced to leave the country by Isaac, after having discovered everything about her. Elsa is in danger of dying from an illness and is immediately operated on her heart, and she has a chance to be with Isaac. Antolina dies falling off a cliff while she attempts to kill her husband, and after her death Isaac and Elsa get married and leave Puente Viejo.

Adela dies in a car accident, due to Fernando sabotaging the brakes. Carmelo to take revenge for the death of his wife, tries to shoot Francisca but Mauricio sees him and to defend his mistress he gets the bullet. Carmelo and Severo show up armed with guns to Casona intending to kill Francisca, because they both believe her guilty of the accident of their wives, but in the end Severo prevents Carmelo from killing Francisca, because Raimundo knows that it was Fernando who killed Adela. Fernando, however, makes Carmelo believe that the culprit of Adela's death is Esteban Fraile. Then the two go to Esteban Fraile, who, manipulated by fernando, shoots Carmelo, then Fernando fires two gunshots and kills Esteban Fraile. Fernando decides to destroy Puente Viejo with the help of the government's undersecretary, Juan Garcia-Morales. The undersecretary is, in reality, the uncle of María Elena, Fernando's deceased wife. The latter makes García Morales believe that he was one of the villagers who killed his niece and so the undersecretary begins to feed a deep hatred towards all the villagers. Meanwhile, Fernando has a secret relationship with nurse Dori Vilches, who is tasked with helping María regain the use of her legs. María understands that the nurse is insane; in fact, she tries to kill María, because she is jealous of her and of her relationship that unites her to Fernando. The latter kills Dori of her by stabbing her and kidnaps María. Subsequently, he also kidnaps Irene and Raimundo. Mad Mesía confesses to Irene that it was he who killed Adela. Severo, Carmelo and Mauricio also armed with rifles, enter the shed with Francisca, but they do not find the Mesía, but Irene and Raimundo tied up. Fernando brings María to an old abandoned monastery where he planted dynamites to kill Francisca, Severo and Carmelo. When Fernando enters the monastery, María approaches the detonator and pulls the lever down causing the monastery to explode with Fernando inside her. At that juncture, María manages to keep herself standing and returns to the Villa. But Fernando is still alive, in fact, he continues to commit crimes: he kills Melitón, kidnaps Marcela, Matías, Camelia, Esperanza, and Beltran, and kills Paco Del Molino, Marcela's father.

Prudencio and Lola are in danger because of the usurer Pablo Armero. Finally Prudencio and Lola manage to get married, while Pablo Armero dies in the fire of Fernando Mesía.

Don Berengario meets Esther, his daughter, he had with Marina, a young girl with whom he had an affair before entering the seminary and becoming a priest. Don Berengario reveals his paternity to all his neighbors, even to Don Anselmo through a letter. The priest returns to Puente Viejo to meet Esther. The young woman, however, seems to be planning some murky plans, in fact she intends to rob Don Berengario and share the money with Samuel, her boyfriend. Marina, her mother, comes to Puente Viejo to look for her, when Esther later said she had died from a hurricane that hit her home in Istanbul. Esther tries in every way that her mother and father do not meet, but she does not succeed. So she, to avoid being exposed by Marina, she fled after stealing 3,000 pesetas from Don Berengario. The priest realizes that he is still in love with Marina and so decides to leave the priestly clothes. He decides to leave to look for Esther with Marina, and thus form a family.

Unexpectedly, Emilia and Alfonso arrive when Matías and Raimundo are discussing at Severo's house. The two spouses were updated by Raimundo on the latest dangers that are occurring in the town; like the death of Paco, who the two want to take revenge for his death. Emilia and Alfonso have returned to help their family, the two hope to kill Fernando Mesía. García-Morales gives up flooding Puente Viejo. Raimundo cornered García-Morales and he confesses to him that he is Maria Elena's uncle, finally the latter goes to the woods where he meets Fernando intending to blow up a carriage with Esperanza and Beltrán inside, finally María's children come saved by Emilia and Alfonso. The perfidious Mesía to take revenge on everyone sets the whole Puente Viejo on fire. Severo and Irene leave Puente Viejo together with their son Carmelito, eventually Carmelo also leaves the country. Don Anselmo also decides to leave the country. María eventually stops Fernando and kills him by shooting him with two pistol shots. Finally Emilia and Alfonso leave with María and her children, as María wants to win back Gonzalo and moves to Cuba. Raimundo and Francisca move to Madrid, while Mauricio goes to America to visit Fe. Consuelo, Lola and Prudencio leave for Rome to live together with Saúl and Julieta.

=== Twelfth season (El resurgir de Puente Viejo) ===
Spain in 1930. Four years have passed since the fire started by Fernando Mesía devastated Puente Viejo. Many houses were completely destroyed and then rebuilt, following a much more modern architecture. New inhabitants arrive in the village. In 1930, workers' uprisings marked the lives of the inhabitants who worked in the mine of the Marquis De Los Visos and in the steel factory of the Solozábal family, two opposite things. Mauricio after returning to Puente Viejo becomes the new mayor. Gracia is dead and little Belén lives with her maternal grandparents. Francisca, in her shadow, tries to recover her house and lands with the help of Isabel De Los Visos, while her husband Raimundo, seeks her tirelessly.

The Solozábal family came to the city to run a family factory, settling in La Casona, the former home of Doña Francisca. It is made up of Don Ignacio, and his three daughters, Marta, Rosa and Carolina. The other family are the De los Visos, who come to the city to manage the mines that the late patriarch bought, and settle in Havana, the former home of Fernando and María. The family is made up of the Marquise Donna Isabel and her children Adolfo and Tomás. Both, Don Ignacio and Doña Isabel, are enemies, although no one knows why.

Soon, Ignacio and Isabel are forced to become relatives when Rosa and Adolfo fall in love, although the young man is also attracted to Marta. When he realizes that his true love for him is Marta, it's too late; Rosa's pregnancy complicates things and Adolfo ends up marrying her. Furthermore, Marta is pregnant and returns married to her cousin Ramón, in a desperate attempt to hide the true paternity of her son, who is none other than Adolfo.

At the same time, Francisca confronts Aunt Eulalia, who wants revenge for past affairs, and leaves Raimundo to protect him. After killing her, she is reunited with her husband, but she is in a vegetable state. Unexpectedly, Emilia returns to take care of him, at the same time it is revealed that Francisca is the leader of the Archangels, a secret organization against the Republic to which Donna Isabel, Tomás and Don Filiberto have joined.

Both in La Casona and in Havana things are starting to get complicated. In the first, the return of Begoña, Don Ignacio's deranged wife, who tries to kill Manuela while manipulating her daughter Rosa of her, as distraught as she is of hers. Furthermore, Ramón discovers the deception. And he starts beating his wife to the point of losing her baby, so Begoña kills him. In the second, the arrival of Jean Pierre, the Marquise's French mistress, destabilizes the De los Visos family, as it turns out that he is Adolfo's real father and, moreover, the cause of Don Ignacio and Donna Isabel's enmity.

Eventually, everything starts to settle down. Doña Isabel discovers the lies of Jean Pierre and discovers that he killed his foreman Maqueda; Rosa reveals that her pregnancy is a lie and she, after being on the verge of killing Carolina, is admitted to a psychiatric hospital with her mother Begoña; Emilia reveals that she has an incurable disease and she has little time to live; Adolfo and Marta leave together to start a new life; and Onésimo and Antoñita marry. Francisca, however, tries to kill Don Filiberto, and the priest, in the grip of madness and fanaticism, fills the town with bombs and Puente Viejo is completely destroyed. Many neighbors die, including Filiberto, Raimundo and Francisca. Francisca herself, now dead, reveals her great secret: her eternal love with Raimundo. She also reveals that dead neighbors still live in the country, where they once were so happy, and that this myth has been passed down for generations. Francisca and Raimundo hold hands, it's time for them to rest.

== Parallel story arcs ==
Along with the main plot, there are some other stories evolving around the story of the main characters. The series also portrays the lives of the secondary characters, most often related to the main personages or at least close to them. Here are the most important secondary characters' stories:

It turns out that the central love story in the show is not Pepa and Tristan's but actually Raimundo and Francisca's. They were deeply in love, but when Raimundo's parents threatened to ruin Francisca's live if she married their son, Raimundo had no other option but to leave Francisca, telling her he never loved her. Pregnant and heartbroken Francisca was married to Salvador Castro, an evil man, infamous for his ruthlessness who also later had a few illegitimate children including Pepa. Thus, Francisca underwent major personality changes, turning into a cold and insensible woman. Raimundo and Francisca establish a simultaneously love-and-hate relationship which ends, after many years, twists and turns, with the 2 of them finally getting together.

Emilia (Sandra Cervera) is Raimundo's adopted daughter and Pepa's best friend. She also has her story. Emilia falls pregnant by a Don Juan named Severyano, a seasonal blue-collar worker in the village who escapes after robbing a wealthy widow's property. Alfonso (Fernando Coronado), another worker, who is Tristan's maidservant Rosario's son, falls in love with Emilia, marries her and accepts her child. Years later, Emilia and Alfonso adopt a troubled teenaged boy named Matìas (Ivàn Montes), whose father and brothers force him to steal. Later Maria returns to save her mother from the emotional blackmail of Severyano who wants her family's property. Severyano shoots with a gun to scare the village's residents off and prevent them from interfering his plans, leading to Sol's unfortunate demise. He even threatens to murder his own daughter but is killed by the police. Despite Emilia and Alfonso's request for Maria's family to return to Spain, she refuses, not wanting to take risks by revealing Francisca the truth behind their disappearance. Later, Emilia gets pregnant with Alfonso's child but after a terrible accident which almost takes her and Alfonso's lives, the 2 decide Puente Viejo is a too dangerous place for their child to grow and leave for Paris.

Matias and Beatriz fall in love but he leaves her to prevent her from getting involved with his biological family's criminal lifestyle. He starts dating a girl named Marcela (Paula Ballesteros) to distract himself from Beatriz and make her forget him. Eventually, Matias' brothers are sent to jail but he is unable to reunite with Beatriz as he marries pregnant Marcela. Extremely jealous Beatriz constantly interferes Matias and Marcela's relationship, including making Matias cheating his wife, but he eventually realises his mistakes and begins wholeheartedly loving Marcela. They become the proud parents of a baby girl named Camelia. When her family move to Czechoslovakia, Beatriz promises herself to return and take Matias away from Marcela.

Soledad (Alejandra Onieva) is Francisca and Salvador's only common child and Pepa and Tristan's half-sister. She's proud, refined and kind-hearted lady from the upper class but suffers a lot because of her love for Juan (Jonàs Beramì), son of Francisca's and then Tristan's maid Rosario (Adelfa Calvo) and Alfonso's younger brother, who often gets into trouble. Soledad and Juan get married but soon divorce after Juan unintentionally causes Soledad's miscarriage, leaving her childless. Both of them try to move on, Juan by hiring a call girl named Enriqueta (Andrea Duro), who falls in love with him, and Soledad by getting engaged to Pepa's step-brother Olmo (Iago Garcìa). Olmo leaves Soledad when he finds out she is unable to have children, but then comes back when he learns that he has a son, Fernando, from his former school teacher with whom he had had an affair. Soledad refuses to accept Olmo and reunites with Juan whom she has always loved. They decide to move to Paris and start their life together again but Olmo and Enriqueta team up to stop them. When Soledad and Juan leave, Enriqueta comes across them and shoots at Soledad, but Juan sacrifices his life to save his beloved. Enriqueta flees, leaving Soledad heartbroken. However, the latter prefers retiring to a monastery than staying with Olmo. Years later, after several attempts of committing suicide, she returns home. Soledad is extremely depressed and to help her overcome her sadness, her servant and best friend, Mariana and the village's priest Padre Anselmo (Mario Martín) decide to bring Soledad's happy memories of piano lessons by hiring a teacher. However, she has no interest, as her only wish is going to Paris where she would be happy with Juan and end her life there. The teacher helps her fulfill her wish. Later, Soledad returns from Paris. Changed. She's no longer the miserable person, with no desire for life, but a cheerful, vivacious and carefree woman who lives the way she wants. In Paris, she met Enriqueta, now begging on the streets, who revealed her everything about Olmo's true colours, including their alliance and how Juan's murder was part of his plan. This was not Olmo's solely crime, he also killed his own adoptive and Pepa's real mother for the sake of his inheritance and is responsible for Fernando's mother's death. Soledad goes back to Puente Viejo for 1 reason: punishing Olmo and stopping him from committing more crimes. With the help of Olmo's assassin, she exposes Olmo and sends him to jail. After that, she leaves to continue her life. When Fernando discovers that his father stands behind his mother's death, he disowns him. He even tries to get his father killed in jail. Olmo survives but loses his memory and turns into a modest, hard-working blue-collar worker. Soon, he gains his memory back but terrified of what he has done and fearing he would do such things again, commits suicide. Soledad marries Terence, an American gentleman with dark complexion but falls in love with Simòn (Jonàs Beramì), a blue-collar worker who looks just like Juan. Despite Soledad's affords to forget Simon and stay with her husband, Terence lets her free. She moves to Australia with Simon and they live happily ever after.

Mariana (Carlota Barò) is Rosario's only daughter, a maidservant of the Montenegros, another friend of Pepa's and Soledad's best friend. She's hard-working, kind and always anxious about her brothers. Mariana is miserable in love as she loses 2 beloved ones. The 1-st is Paquito, her mother's godson who arrives at Puente Viejo to support Rosario's family after her youngest son's departure. Paquito gets unwillingly involved with drug traffickers disguised as pharmacists and loses his life. The 2-nd is Antonio, who arrives at the village to avenge his brother's death, who was killed by Mariana's brothers to protect their sister from rape. Antonio falls in love with Mariana. She loves him back, but when discovers his initial intentions, murders him in an act of self-defence and is jailed. Years later, Mariana returns to Francisca's mansion to work as a maid as she believes her sentence is not enough punishment for her crime. Eventually, she finds love again and marries photographer Nicolàs Ortuño (Alejandro Sigüenza), with whom she acquires a daughter named Juana. Unfortunately, the family's happy life is ruined when Mariana is murdered under mysterious circumstances.

Pepa's children also have their parallel story arcs, as well as the characters of the 1-st generation. Strong-minded and independent Aurora's tragic love story is also portrayed in the show. She falls in love with and engages to Conrado (Rubèn Serrano), a stubborn, yet kind-hearted geologist who's later brutally killed by his ex-fiancée while defending Aurora. After his demise, Aurora moves to Paris to pursue higher studies. She only returns to Puente Viejo after Bosco and Ines' death to take Beltran to be raised by Martin and Maria in Cuba.

The series also shows some comedy moments, portraying the life of Pedro Mirañar (Enric Benavent), Puente Viejo's mayor and his family. His wife Dolores (Maribel Ripoll) is a self-confident and chatty woman, prone to gossiping who later temporarily takes her husband's position. Their son Hipòlito (Selu Nieto) is a cheerful and vivacious young man with his head in the clouds who experiences difficulties in choosing occupation or hobbies he wants to get busy with, creating, along with his parents, a lot of entertaining situations. He saves Quintina (Blanca Parès), a circus employee who suffers from congenital blindness and they fall in love. Hipolito and his family help Quintina recover her vision by paying for her surgery. Quintina marries Hipolito, joining the comic squad of the show but later leaves her husband to be with a circus employer. Dolores and Pedro hire a tailor named Gracia (Carmen Canivell) to befriend Hipolito and distract him from his grief. The 2 initially dislike each other, only to fall in love. After the news of Quintina's death arrives, they get married. Dolores and Pedro's marriage falls apart after the latter heads off for Russia to join the communists and leaves his spouse for a crush on a local woman. Dolores finds comfort in the company of Tiburcio (Cèsar Capilla), a muscular and masculine circus employee. News about Pedro's death arrives from Russia, along with his urn. Dolores and Tiburcio get married.

== Cast ==
=== Main cast ===
Actor	Character	Episodes
María Bouzas	Francisca Montenegro †	1 -2324
Ramón Ibarra	Raimundo Ulloa †	1 –2324
Selu Nieto	Hipólito Mirañar	1 –2324
Maribel Ripoll	María Dolores Asenjo	1 –2324
Mario Zorrilla	Mauricio Godoy	1 –2324
Iván Montes	Matías Castañeda	950 –2324
José Gabriel Campos	Onésimo Fernández	1269 –2324
Paula Ballesteros	Marcela del Molino	1651 –2324
César Capilla	Tiburcio Comino	1713 –2324
Silvia Marsó	Isabel de los Visos	2161 –2324
Manuel Regueiro	Ignacio Solozábal	2161 –2324
Sara Sanz	Rosa Solozábal	2161 –2324
Berta Castañé	Carolina Solozábal	2161 –2324
Laura Minguell	Marta Solozábal	2161 –2324
Adrián Pedraja	Adolfo de los Visos	2161 –2324
Alejandro Vergara	Tomás Solozábal	2161 –2324
Almudena Cid	Manuela Sánchez	2161 –2324
Adrián Exposito	Pablo Centeno	2161 –2324
Ángel H. Sánchez	Jesús Urrutia	2161 –2324
Arantxa Aranguren	Encarnación Iglesia	2161 –2324
Roser Tapias	Alicia Urrutia	2161 –2324
Andrés Suárez	Don Filiberto †	2161 –2324
Carles Sanjaime	Eugenio Huertas	2161 –2324
Toni Salgado	Iñigo Marqueda †	2161 –2324
Lucía Caraballo	Antoñita Malo	2161 –2324

=== Former main cast ===
Actor	Character	Episodes
Sara Ballesteros	Angustias Osorio †	1–57
Xosé Barato	Alberto Guerra †	58–127
Pablo Espinosa	Ramiro Castañeda	1–179
Cuca Escribano	Agueda Molero †	180–260
Pablo Castañón	Sebastián Ulloa †	58–260
Leonor Martín	Gregoria Casas	136–365
Jonás Beramí	Juan Castañeda †	1–365
Andrea Duro	Enriqueta	261–365
Megan Montaner	Pepa Aguirre †	1–381
Miguel García Borda	Roque Fresnedoso	382–530
Diana Gómez	Pía Toledano	382–530
Victoria Camps Medina	Jacinta Ramos †	531–617
Álex Gadea	Tristán Ulloa †	1–666
Charlotte Vega	Rita Aranda †	571–750
Iago García	Olmo Mesía†	180 – 570 / 651 – 750
Alejandra Onieva	Soledad Castro	1 – 570 / 651 – 780
Jonás Berami	Simón Cármeta	751–780
Juli Cantó	Fulgencio Montenegro †	781–835
Jorge Pobes	Anibal Buendía	571–835
Javier Abad	Isidro Buendía †	571–835
Mercedes León	Bernarda Jiménez †	781–949
Blanca Parés	Quintina Mirañar †	751–999
Rubén Serrano	Conrado Buenaventura †	836–1029
Ariadna Gaya	Aurora Ulloa	618–1136
Fariba Sheikhan	Inés Lagar †	881–1136
Enric Benavent	Pedro Mirañar †	1–1136
Francisco Ortiz	Bosco Ulloa †	836–1230
María de Nati	Prado Castañeda	1137–1268
Carlota Baró	Mariana Ortuño †	1–1351
Jaime Lorente	Elías Mato †	1269–1425
Álvaro Morte	Lucas Moliner	973–1500
Adriana Torrebejano	Sol Santacruz †	1137–1500
Adelfa Calvo	Rosario Pacheco	1–1500
Carlos de Austria	Cristóbal Castro	1426–1606
Sandra González Garzón	Ana Uriarte †	1607–1621
Ángel de Miguel	Hernando Dos Casas	1269–1650
Giulia Charm	Beatriz Dos Casas	1271–1650
Yara Puebla	Camila Mella	1271–1650
Aída de la Cruz	Candela Mendizábal †	506 – 1500 / 1607 – 1712
Alejandro Sigüenza	Nicolás Ortuño	836 – 1351 / 1501 – 1820
Sandra Cervera	Emilia Samaniego	1–1846
Fernando Coronado	Alfonso Castañeda	1–1846
Jordi Coll	Martín Castro	382 – 949 / 1911 – 1940
Mario Martín	Anselmo Salvide	1–2049
Marta Tomasa Worner	Fe Pérez	781–2049
Claudia Galán	Julieta Uriarte	1607–2049
Rubén Bernal	Saúl Ortega	1607–2049
Ibrahim Al Shami	Isaac Guerrero	1835–2144
María Lima	Antolina Ramos †	1835–2144
Alejandra Meco	Elsa Laguna	1866–2144
Raúl Peña	Carmelo Leal	950–2160
Chico García	Severo Santacruz	950–2160
Carmen Canivell	Gracia Hermosa †	1137–2160
Miguel Uribe	Berengario Soto	1269–2160
Trinidad Iglesias	Consuelo Uriarte	1607–2160
José Milán	Prudencio Ortega	1607–2160
Ruth Llopis	Adela de Jano †	1607–2160
Roberto Saiz	Melitón Melquíades †	1713–2160
Rebeca Sala	Irene Campuzano	1821–2160
Carlos Serrano	Fernando Mesía †	382 – 750 / 1847 – 2160
Loreto Mauleón	María Ulloa	382 – 999 / 1941 – 2160
Lucía Margo	Dolores "Lola" Mendaña	2050–2160

== Series overview ==
Season	Episodes	Series premiere	Series finale	Broadcast Ratings	
Season	Episodes	Series premiere	Series finale	Viewers	Share
1	381	23 February 2011	21 August 2012	1,615,000	14.5%
2	200	22 August 2012	6 June 2013	1,960,000	15.4%
3	85	7 June 2013	4 October 2013	1,940,000	15.2%
4	169	7 October 2013	9 June 2014	?	?
5	195	10 June 2014	16 March 2015	?	?
6	200	17 March 2015	28 December 2015	?	?
7	254	29 December 2015	3 January 2017	?	?
8	121	4 January 2017	26 June 2017	?	?
9	225	27 June 2017	23 May 2018	?	?
10	219	24 May 2018	3 April 2019	?	?
11	111	4 April 2019	10 September 2019	?	?
12	165	11 September 2019	20 May 2020	?	?
Total	2324	23 February 2011	20 May 2020	—N/a	—N/a

== Awards and nominations ==
=== Premios TP de Oro ===
Year	Category	Nominated work	Result
2011	Best telenovela or series	El secreto de Puente Viejo	Nominated

=== Fotogramas de Plata ===
Year	Category	Nominated work	Result
2012	Best television actress	María Bouzas	Nominated

=== Premio Asturias ===
Year	Category	Nominated work	Result
2012	Asturian character of the year	Pablo Castañón	Won

=== Premios Iris ===
Year	Category	Nominated work	Result
2012	Best screenplay	Supporting screenplay	Nominated
2012	Best Music for Television	Álex Conrado	Nominated

=== Festival MadridImagen ===
Year	Category	Nominated work	Result
2013	Best Spanish TV Series Season		Nominated

=== Premios Jóvenes D.O. La Mancha ===
Year	Category	Nominated work	won
2012	Television and Performing Arts	Jordi Coll	Won
2012	Television and Performing Arts	Loreto Mauleón	Won

=== European Soap Fan Day ===
Year	Category	Nominated work	Result
2013	Best TV Series of the Year		Won
2013	Best Foreign TV Actor	Álex Gadea	Won

=== Premio Magazine Estrella Distinción Especial ===
Year	Category	Nominated work	Result
2011	Best Actors	Megan Montaner and Álex Gadea	Won

=== Premio Paco Rabal ===
Year	Category	Nominated work	Result
2014	Best Series	El secreto de Puente Viejo	Won

=== Premio CENCOR ===
Year	Category	Nominated work	Result
2013	Best Actress	Sandra Cervera	Won

=== Premios Neox Fan Awards ===
Year	Category	Nominated work	Result
2015	Best Actress	Adriana Torrebejano	Won
2014	Best Actor	Jordi Coll	Won
2014	Best Actress	Loreto Mauleón	Nominated
2014	Best TV series	El secreto de Puente Viejo	Nominated
2014	Best Kiss	Jordi Coll and Loreto Mauleón	Nominated
2013	Best TV series	El secreto de Puente Viejo	Nominated
2013	Best Actor	Álex Gadea	Nominated

=== Premios Andalucía ===
Year	Category	Nominated work	Result
2015	Andaluz Character of the Year	Chico García	Won

=== Premio Catalunya ===
Year	Category	Nominated work	Result
2015	Best TV Actress	María Bouzas	Won

=== Premios Grand Prix Corallo Italia ===
Year	Category	Nominated work	Result
2015	Best TV Series	El secreto de Puente Viejo	Won
2015	Best TV Actress	María Bouzas	Won

=== Premios Unión de Actores ===
Year	Category	Nominated work	Result
2015	Best Protagonist Actress	María Bouzas	Pending
2015	Best Supporting Actor	Selu Nieto	Pending
2015	Best Supporting Actor	Mario Martín	Pending
2015	Best Supporting Actress	Sandra Cervera	Pending
2015	Best Supporting Actress	Carlota Baró	Pending
2015	Best Supporting Actor	Ramón Ibarra Robles	Pending
2015	Best Supporting Actor	Enric Benavent	Pending
2015	Best Main Actor	Boré Buika	Pending

== International broadcast ==
Country or region	Network	Airing date	Timeslot	Notes
Vietnam (under a 45–50 minutes format)	VTV2	1 April 2017 – 15 April 2018	Every day 23:15 - 24:00	Episode 1 to 200
Vietnam (under a 45–50 minutes format)	VTV3	16 April 2018 – 31 October 2024	Monday - Friday 13:45 - 14:35	Episode 201 to Episode 1909
