= Sandra Cervera =

Spanish actress

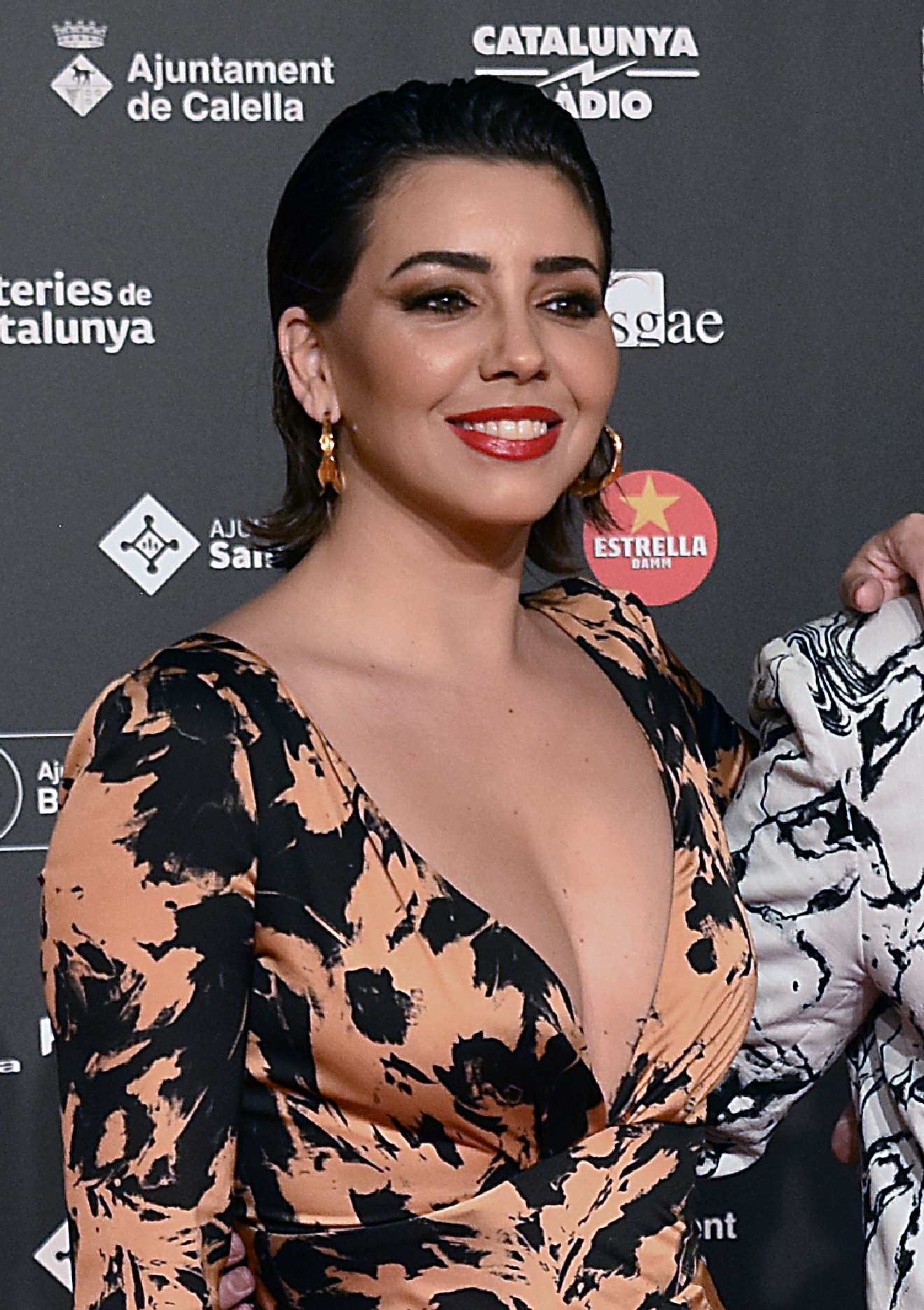
- Sandra Cervera in 2022
- Born: Sandra Cervera Peris; 19 June 1985 (age 39); Valencia, Spain
- Occupation: Actress
- Years active: 2005-present

Sandra Cervera Peris (born June 19, 1985) is a Spanish actress, presenter and singer known for her role in the soap opera, El secreto de Puente Viejo, where she played Emilia Ulloa for eight years.

== Biography. ==
Her beginnings were in Canal Nou with series such as Maniàtics, Socarrats, Check-In Hotel, all of them sitcoms with sketch episodes. In 2009 she was chosen to participate in 40, El Musical.

In 2011 she signed for the new daily series El secreto de Puente Viejo of Antena 3, playing Emilia Ulloa. That same year she also participates in an episode of Hospital Central.

On September 22, 2012 she presented, along with Boro Peiró, the act of Selection of the Court of Honor of the fallas 2013.

In 2018 she left El secreto de Puente Viejo after 1,848 chapters and the departure of her character to France. A few months later she appears in an episode of Paquita Salas playing herself while doing her job on the set of El secreto de Puente Viejo. She also signs for Family Duo the new talent show of À Punt being one of the four members of the jury along with Sergio Alcover, Mari Giner and Carlos Marco.

In 2019 she returned again to El secreto de Puente Viejo for a few chapters, closing her participation in the series and joined the second season of Açò és un destarifo, sketches program of À Punt. In the summer of the same year she signed for the series Diumenge Paella, also on the Valencian channel, which premiered in January 2020 and undertook a first season of 13 episodes.

== Filmography ==
=== Short films ===
Year	Title	Role
2005	Al revés	
2005	Theatron	
2008	Comeparedes	Bea
2011	Soliloquio	
2011	Delirium TV	
2012	La Cruz	
2017	Distintos	Laura

=== Television ===
Year	Title	Channel	Character	Duration
2006	Cartas a Sorolla	Canal Nou	Isabel Bastida	TV-Movie
2007 - 2008	Maniàtics	Canal Nou	Vanessa	52 episodes
2008	Socarrats	Canal Nou	Patri	122 episodes
2009	Desátate	Canal Nou	Pat	TV-Movie
2009	Check-In Hotel	Canal Nou	Xesca	56 episodes
2010	Unió Musical Da Capo	Canal Nou	Empar	1 episode
2011	Hospital Central	Telecinco	Mara	1 episode
2011 - 2020	El secreto de Puente Viejo	Antena 3	Emilia Ulloa Balboa de Castañeda	1.888 episodes
2018	Paquita Salas	Netflix	Herself	1 episode
2020	Diumenge, paella	À Punt	Sara Costa Miralles	13 episodes
2022–present	Desconocidas	Canal Sur / À Punt		
2022–present	La última	Disney+		

=== Television programs ===
Year	Program	Channel	Notas	Duration
2018 - 2019	Family Duo	À Punt	Jury	27 programs
2018 - 2019	Assumptes interns	À Punt	Guest	2 programs
2019	Açò és un destarifo	À Punt	Actress	26 programs
2019	Àrtic	TV3	Guest	1 program
2021–present	The Dancer	La 1	Host	10 programs

=== Web series ===
Year	Title	Channel	Character	Duration
2009	Los hermanos caníbales			
2009	Camera Condon			
2009	Jeriatric Park			
2016	Temporada baja	Flooxer	María José	1 episode

== Theater ==
Year	Title	Character
2006	Parpadeos	
2006	Cachorros	
2009	Confesiones de 7 mujeres pecando solas	
2009 - 2012	Los 40, el Musical	Alex
2019	Flashdance, El Musical	Gloria

== Other work ==
Year	Title
2007	Spot 1: Llegir en valencià
2008	Performance with Manolo Chinato. Song: Abrazado a la tristeza
2011	Videoclip: Un día especial and Torre de Control
2011	Montesa tourist promotion advertisement
2011	Song: Un habitante más de Puente Viejo, with Selu Nieto
2012	Videoclip: Tú, by Shuarma
2012	Presenter at the act of selection of the Court of Honor of the fallas 2013.
2012-2013, 2015-2018	Commercials during El secreto de Puente Viejo, Orange, Lo Mónaco (colchones) and Dentix.
2013	Movieclip: On fire
