= Diana (2018 film) =

- Theatrical release poster
- Directed by: Alejo Moreno
- Screenplay by: Alejo Moreno
- Produced by: Alejo Moreno
- Starring: Ana Rujas; Jorge Roldán; Laura Ledesma; Cayetana Cabezas; Lucio Romero; Moisés Rodríguez
- Cinematography: Irene Cruz
- Edited by: Alejo Moreno
- Music by: Ismael Viñoly
- Release dates: 15 April 2018 (Málaga); 21 September 2018 (Spain)
- Country: Spain
- Language: Spanish

Diana is a 2018 Spanish psychological thriller directed, written, and produced by Alejo Moreno which stars Ana Rujas and Jorge Roldán.

== Plot ==
Upon their encounter in an apartment in La Castellana, Sofía (a female escort with the name 'Diana' tattooed on her leg) and her client Jano (a businessman initially introducing himself as Hugo) develop a game, gradually exposing elements of their closeted personalities.

== Cast ==
- Ana Rujas as Sofía
- Jorge Roldán as Jano
- Laura Ledesma as Diana
- Cayetana Cabezas
- Lucio Romero
- Moisés Rodríguez

== Release ==
The film was presented in the Zonazine section of the 21st Málaga Film Festival in April 2018. It made the official selection slate of the 42nd Montreal World Film Festival. It was released theatrically in Spain on 21 September 2018.

== Reception ==
Quim Casas of El Periódico de Catalunya rated the film 2 out of 5 stars, writing that "the only possible charm and interest of Diana is perhaps its character, natural or intended, intuitive or premeditated, of an amateur film".

Jordi Costa of El País assessed that "[the presence of] energetic displays of style" in the film does not hide the fact that "there is no convincing character portrayal, but only a highly questionable male fantasy".

Sergio F. Pinilla of Cinemanía rated the film 4 out 5 stars, considering that it features "a diabolical plot, profuse in contextual details" and "two memorable characters".

== See also ==
- List of Spanish films of 2018
