= Ramón Ibarra =

Spanish actor (born 1958)

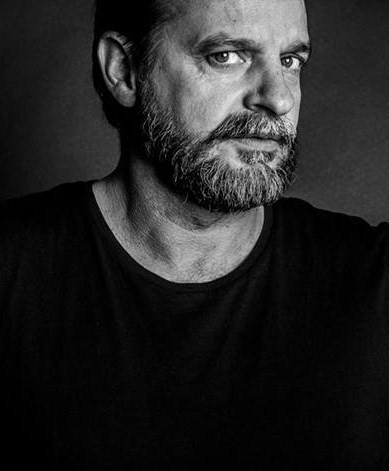
- Actor Ramón Ibarra
- Born: Ramón Ibarra Robles; August 31, 1958; Spain
- Occupation: Actor

Ramón Ibarra Robles, commonly known as Ramón Ibarra (born 31 August 1958) in Getxo, Vizcaya, País Vasco, Spain, is a Spanish actor known for appearing in the long-running telenovela El secreto de Puente Viejo, as well as Julieta and B.

== Biography ==
He studied at the University of the Basque Country (Euskal Herriko Unibertsitatea), where he obtained a degree in Information Sciences. After completing his studies, he decided to pursue a career in acting and, at the age of 22, in 1980, he made his debut as a professional actor in the play Makina Beltza. It was then that he joined the theater company Kolektibo Karraka (Karraka Theater Group Foundation), one of the most important Basque companies of the 1980s, which was formed from the core of the Cómicos de la Legua workshop (during 1978, 1979, and 1980, when it was dissolved).

The Karraka company, which was active for more than a decade before disbanding (1981–1995), reunited in 2009 with most of its members (including Ramón Ibarra) to stage a revival of the musical Bilbao, Bilbao.

He has worked as a copywriter and screenwriter for television programs. He has also directed several plays. In addition, he was a professor of Performing Arts Theory and Audiovisual Performing arts at the School of Dramatic Arts in Basauri, Vizcaya (Spain).
