= Slam (2016 film) =

2016 Italian film by Andrea Molaioli

- Italian theatrical release poster
- Italian: Slam: Tutto per una ragazza
- Directed by: Andrea Molaioli
- Written by: Francesco Bruni; Andrea Molaioli; Ludovica Rampoldi
- Based on: Slam by Nick Hornby
- Produced by: Carlotta Calori; Francesca Cima; Nicola Giuliano
- Starring: Ludovico Tersigni; Barbara Ramella; Jasmine Trinca; Luca Marinelli
- Cinematography: Daria D'Antonio
- Edited by: Giogiò Franchini
- Music by: Teho Teardo
- Production companies: Indigo Film; Rai Cinema
- Distributed by: Universal Pictures International; Netflix
- Release dates: 20 November 2016 (Torino); 23 March 2017 (Italy)
- Running time: 100 minutes
- Country: Italy
- Language: Italian

Slam (Italian: Slam: Tutto per una ragazza) is a 2016 Italian romantic comedy film directed by Andrea Molaioli, based on the 2007 novel of the same name by Nick Hornby. It premiered at the Torino Film Festival on 20 November 2016 before receiving a theatrical release in Italy on 23 March 2017. It was acquired by Netflix for international distribution and released on the platform in April 2017.

== Premise ==
Samuele is a 16-year-old skateboarder who idolizes Tony Hawk and dreams of moving to California. These plans are uprooted when he meets Alice.

== Cast ==
- Ludovico Tersigni as Samuele "Sam"
- Barbara Ramella as Alice
- Jasmine Trinca as Antonella
- Luca Marinelli as Valerio
- Fiorenza Tessari as Alice's mother
- Pietro Ragusa as Alice's father
- Gianluca Broccatelli as "Lepre"
- Fausto Maria Sciarappa as Marco
- Tony Hawk as himself

== Production ==
Although the novel takes place in London, the film was set in Rome, where filming took place.

== Release ==
The film premiered at the Torino Film Festival on 20 November 2016. It was later released theatrically in Italy on 23 March 2017.

In early March 2017, Netflix acquired the film for international distribution, excluding Italy, and released it on the platform on 15 April 2017.
