= Summertime (TV series) =

2020 Italian television series

- Genre: Teen drama
- Based on: Three Meters Above the Sky by Federico Moccia
- Developed by: Mirko Cetrangolo; Anita Rivaroli
- Directed by: Francesco Lagi; Lorenzo Sportiello
- Starring: Coco Rebecca Edogamhe; Ludovico Tersigni; Amanda Campana; Andrea Lattanzi; Giovanni Maini; Alicia Ann Edogamhe; Alberto Boubakar Malanchino; Thony; Maria Sole Mansutti; Mario Sgueglia; Amparo Piñero; Cristiano Caccamo
- Composer: Giorgio Poi
- Country of origin: Italy
- Original language: Italian
- No. of seasons: 3
- No. of episodes: 24

Production
- Executive producer: Donatella Di Benedetto
- Producers: Marco Chimenz; Francesca Longardi; Giovanni Stabilini; Riccardo Tozzi
- Production locations: Emilia-Romagna, Lazio
- Cinematography: Federico Schlatter
- Editors: Giuseppe Trepiccione; Alberto Masi; Marco Signoretti
- Running time: 36–54 minutes
- Production company: Cattleya

Original release
- Network: Netflix
- Release: 29 April 2020 – 4 May 2022

Summertime is an Italian teen drama television series produced by Cattleya that premiered on Netflix on 29 April 2020. The series stars Rebecca Coco Edogamhe, Ludovico Tersigni, and Amanda Campana. It takes place at a small town on the Adriatic coast, Cesenatico, and revolves around Summer (Rebecca Coco Edogamhe) and her love life. It is inspired by Three Meters Above the Sky by Federico Moccia. After the premiere of the first season, Netflix renewed the series for a second season. In 2021, Netflix reported that Summertime was renewed for a third and final season.

== Plot ==
In the town of Cesenatico, Summer and Ale are two people with opposite lifestyles. Summer is a very introverted young woman; she hates the summer and decides to find a job at The Grand Hotel Cesenatico to financially support her mother as her jazz musician father has left for the summer to work abroad. Summer has two best friends, Sofia and Edo, and a younger sister named Blue. Ale is a young man originally from Rome who is a famous motorcyclist. He has taken a break from competing with his racing team for the summer after a dangerous racing accident nearly kills him. His father is his greatest supporter and wants him to go back to racing once the summer is over; however, Ale has lost his interest in racing. Ale's mother, Laura, is the manager of the hotel where Summer works. Ale falls in love with Summer and tries to woo her.

== Cast ==
- Coco Rebecca Edogamhe as Summer Bennati
- Ludovico Tersigni as Alessandro "Ale" Alba
- Amanda Campana as Sofia
- Andrea Lattanzi as Dario
- Giovanni Maini as Edo
- Thony as Isabella
- Alice Ann Edogamhe as Blue Bennati
- Stefano Fregni as Piero
- Giuseppe Giacobazzi as Loris
- Eugenio Krauss as Bruno De Cara
- Maria Sole Mansutti as Laura Alba
- Mario Sgueglia as Maurizio Alba
- Caterina Biasiol as Maddalena
- Alberto Boubakar Malanchino as Antony Bennati

== Episodes ==
=== Series overview ===
Series	Episodes	Originally released
1	8	29 April 2020
2	8	3 June 2021
3	8	4 May 2022

=== Season 1 (2020) ===
No. overall	No. in season	Title	Directed by	Written by	Original release date
1	1	"I Hate Summer"	Lorenzo Sportiello	Enrico Audenino, Mirko Cetrangolo, Francesco Lagi & Anita Rivaroli	29 April 2020
2	2	"Just You & I"	Lorenzo Sportiello	Enrico Audedino, Mirko Cetrangolo, Francesco Lagi & Anita Rivaroli	29 April 2020
3	3	"A Moment at Night"	Lorenzo Sportiello	Story by : Sofia Assirelli, Enrico Audenino, Mirko Cetrangolo, Francesco Lagi & Anita Rivaroli; Teleplay by : Sofia Assirelli, Enrico Audenino & Francesco Lagi	29 April 2020
4	4	"A Glimpse of Peace"	Lorenzo Sportiello	Story by : Enrico Audenino, Mirko Cetrangolo, Daniela Delle Foglie, Francesco Lagi & Anita Rivaroli; Teleplay by : Enrico Audenino, Daniela Delle Foglie & Francesco Lagi	29 April 2020
5	5	"Without You"	Francesco Lagi	Story by : Sofia Assirelli, Enrico Audenino, Mirko Cetrangolo, Francesco Lagi & Anita Rivaroli; Teleplay by : Enrico Audenino, Daniela Gambaro & Francesco Lagi	29 April 2020
6	6	"Those Who Remain"	Francesco Lagi	Story by : Enrico Audenino, Mirko Cetrangolo, Daniela Delle Foglie, Francesco Lagi & Anita Rivaroli; Teleplay by : Enrico Audenino, Francesco Lagi & Vanessa Picciarelli	29 April 2020
7	7	"Don't You Cry"	Francesco Lagi	Story by : Enrico Audenino, Mirko Cetrangolo, Francesco Lagi & Anita Rivaroli; Teleplay by : Enrico Audenino, Daniela Gambaro & Francesco Lagi	29 April 2020
8	8	"Another Winter"	Francesco Lagi	Story by : Enrico Audenino, Mirko Cetrangolo, Francesco Lagi & Anita Rivaroli; Teleplay by : Enrico Audenino, Francesco Lagi & Vanessa Picciarelli	29 April 2020

=== Season 2 (2021) ===
No. overall	No. in season	Title	Directed by	Written by	Original release date
9	1	"Episode 1"	Francesco Lagi	Enrico Audenino & Francesco Lagi	3 June 2021
10	2	"Episode 2"	Francesco Lagi	Story by : Enrico Audenino & Francesco Lagi; Teleplay by : Enrico Audenino, Francesco Lagi & Vanessa Picciarelli	3 June 2021
11	3	"Episode 3"	Francesco Lagi	Story by : Enrico Audenino & Francesco Lagi; Teleplay by : Enrico Audenino, Daniela Gambaro & Francesco Lagi	3 June 2021
12	4	"Episode 4"	Francesco Lagi	Story by : Enrico Audenino & Francesco Lagi; Teleplay by : Enrico Audenino, Luca Giordano & Francesco Lagi	3 June 2021
13	5	"Episode 5"	Marta Savina	Story by : Enrico Audenino & Francesco Lagi; Teleplay by : Enrico Audenino, Luca Giordano & Francesco Lagi	3 June 2021
14	6	"Episode 6"	Marta Savina	Story by : Enrico Audenino & Francesco Lagi; Teleplay by : Enrico Audenino, Francesco Lagi & Vanessa Picciarelli	3 June 2021
15	7	"Episode 7"	Marta Savina	Story by : Enrico Audenino & Francesco Lagi; Teleplay by : Enrico Audenino, Daniela Gambaro & Francesco Lagi	3 June 2021
16	8	"Episode 8"	Marta Savina	Story by : Enrico Audenino & Francesco Lagi; Teleplay by : Enrico Audenino, Luca Giordano & Francesco Lagi	3 June 2021

== Production ==
=== Casting ===
Over 2,000 people attended the casting calls in Cesena, Cesenatico, Ravenna, and Rimini. The full cast had consisted of first-time actors, with the exception of Ludovico Tersigni.

=== Filming ===
The filming of the series began in Marina di Ravenna, moved to Cesenatico, and ended in Rome. Filming from the first season was finished on 5 September 2019.

The series, produced by Cattleya, was inspired by Three Meters Above The Sky by Federico Moccia.

=== Release ===
The first trailer was released on 8 April 2020 in Italian. The English trailer was released a week later on 15 April. The full first season of Summertime was released on 29 April 2020 on Netflix.
