= Arturo García Sancho =

Spanish actor (born 1990)

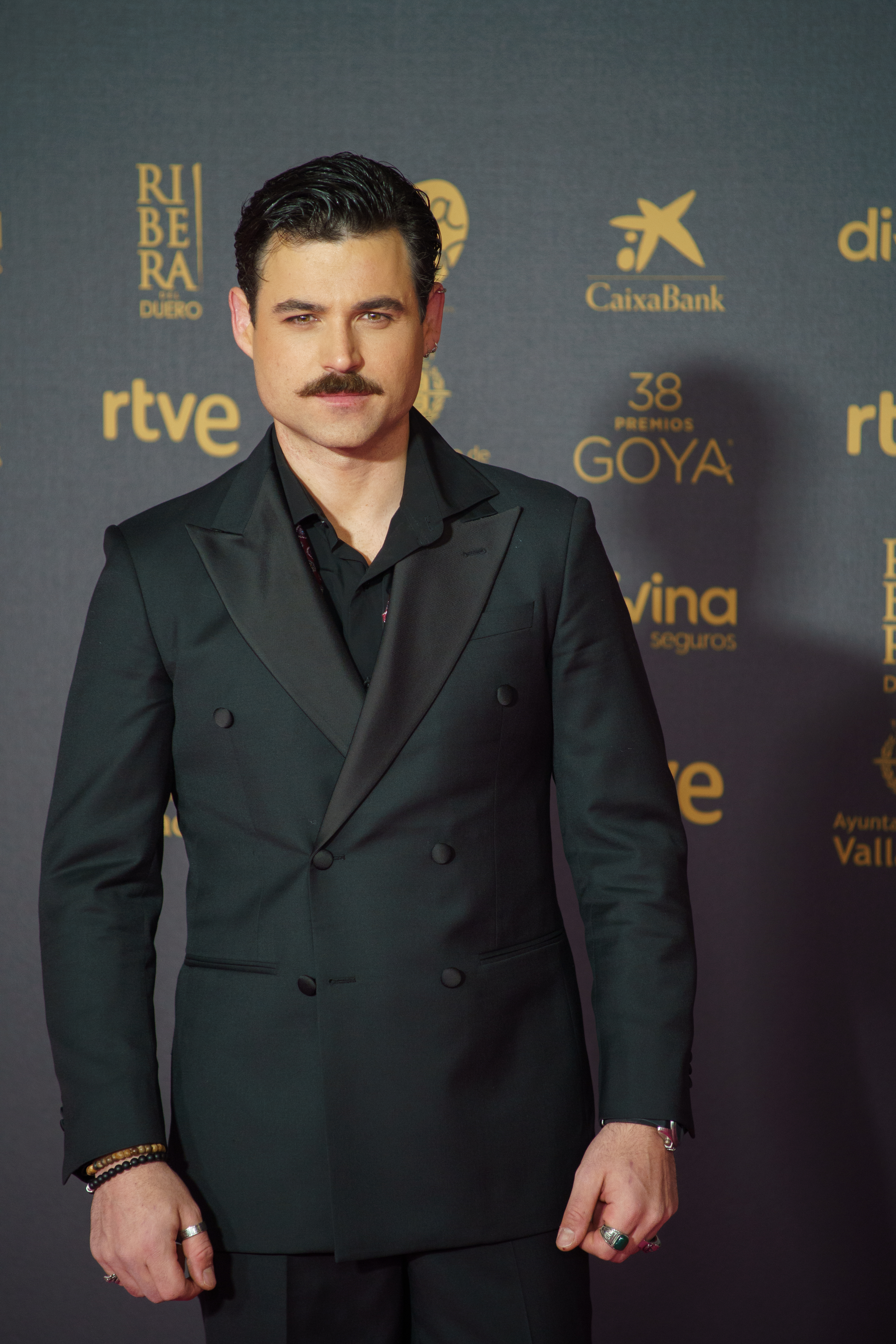
- García Sancho in 2024
- Born: Arturo García Sancho; 16 July 1990 (age 35); Bilbao, Biscay, Spain
- Occupation: Actor
- Years active: 2019–present
- Known for: La Promesa

Arturo García Sancho (born July 16, 1990) is a Spanish actor, known for playing the leading role of Manuel de Luján y Ezquerdo in the soap opera La Promesa.

== Early life and education ==
Arturo García Sancho was born on July 16, 1990, in Bilbao, in the province of Biscay, in the Basque Country (Spain), at the age of nineteen he moved to Madrid to study acting. Initially known only as Arturo Sancho, since 2023 he has decided to use his full birth name following the Daniel Sancho case.

He studied interpretation at the Juan Carlos Corazza studio, and at the same time he attended seminars and workshops. He then trained in singing courses for musical theater with Marta Valverde, then he attended a seminar entitled Constelaciones Familiares with classes given by Joan Garriga and another entitled Orden y Caos on the expression and technique of the actor at the Juan Carlos Corazza acting school, where after four years he completed his training.

== Career ==
Arturo García Sancho began acting in several theater shows such as Bodas de sangre, La raíz del grito, El porvenir en un beso, Efectos, Amores chejov and Las mujeres sabias (musical). In 2010, for a period of three weeks, he participated as a contestant in the twelfth edition of the reality show Gran Hermano broadcast on Telecinco, where he remained until his expulsion.

In 2019 she starred in the short film Encadenado directed by Patricia García and Santiago Varela, while in 2020 she starred in the short film Rodio. She has also taken part in several music videos such as La vida no es la la la by Café Quijano, El precio de tu amor by Son Cruz, Te vine a ver by Los Kjarkas and Dueño de todo by Ukarmarka.

In 2022 he played the role of the young Bernat Estanyol in the Netflix series Heirs to the Land (Los herederos de la tierra). That same year he was included in the cast of the Atresplayer Premium series The Route (La ruta). In 2023 he was chosen by TVE to play the role of the protagonist Manuel de Luján y Ezquerdo in the soap opera broadcast on La 1 La Promesa.

== Filmography ==
=== TV series ===
Year	Title	Role	Network	Notes
2022	Heirs to the Land (Los herederos de la tierra)	Young Bernat Estanyol	Netflix	2 episodes
2022	The Route (La ruta)		Atresplayer Premium	
2023–present	La Promesa	Manuel de Luján y Ezquerdo	La 1	¿? episodes

=== Short films ===
Year	Title	Director
2019	Encadenado	Patricia García and Santiago Varela
2020	Rodio	

=== Videoclip ===
Title	Artist
La vida no es la la la	Café Quijano
El precio de tu amor	Son Cruz
Te vine a ver	Los Kjarkas
Dueño de todo	Ukarmarka

== Theater ==
Title	Author	Director
Bodas de sangre	Federico García Lorca	Ignacio Ysasi
La raíz del grito		Juan Carlos Corazza
El porvenir en un beso		Oscar Velado
Efectos		Rosa Morales Kucharski
Amores chejov		Paula Soldevila
Las mujeres sabias (musical)	Molière	Andrés Alemán

== Television programs ==
Year	Title	Network	Role
2010	Gran Hermano 12	Telecinco	Concursante
