= Los Farad =

- Promotional release poster
- Created by: Mariano Barroso; Alejandro Hernández
- Directed by: Mariano Barroso; Polo Menárguez
- Starring: Miguel Herrán; Susana Abaitua; Pedro Casablanc; Nora Navas; Adam Jezierski; Amparo Piñero; Fernando Tejero; Omar Ayuso; Igal Naor
- Country of origin: Spain
- Original language: Spanish
- No. of seasons: 1
- No. of episodes: 8

Production
- Cinematography: Ángel Iguácel
- Production companies: MOD Producciones; Espotlight Media

Original release
- Network: Prime Video
- Release: 12 December 2023

Los Farad is a Spanish thriller television series created by Mariano Barroso and Alejandro Hernández which stars Miguel Herrán.

== Plot ==
The plot explores the entourages of Costa del Sol's jet set and the geopolitics of Cold War through the eyes of an outsider, Oskar, an ambitious aerobics instructor from Aluche who falls for Sara, heiress of the Farad, a wealthy clan of weapon dealers in 1980s Marbella.

== Cast ==
- Miguel Herrán as Oskar
- Susana Abaitua as Sara Farad
- Pedro Casablanc as Leo Farad
- Nora Navas as Carmen
- Adam Jezierski as Hugo
- Amparo Piñero as Tanya
- Fernando Tejero as Manuel
- Omar Ayuso
- Igal Naor as Mawad

== Production ==
A MOD Producciones and Espotlight Media production, the series was directed by Mariano Barroso and Polo Menárguez. It was lensed by Ángel Iguácel. Shooting locations included Motril and Almuñécar.

== Release ==
The series debuted on Prime Video on 12 December 2023.
