= La Promesa =

Spanish television soap opera

- Genre: Soap opera; Period drama
- Based on: an original idea by Josep Cister Rubio
- Starring: Ana Garcés; Eva Martín; Manuel Regueiro; Arturo García Sancho; María Castro; Joaquín Climent; Antonio Velázquez; Andrea del Río; Carmen Flores Sandoval; Teresa Quintero; Carmen Asecas; Paula Losada; Alicia Bercán; Alberto González; Marga Martínez; Enrique Fortún; Sara Molina
- Original language: Spanish

Production
- Executive producers: Josep Cister Rubio; Borja Gálvez
- Producers: Ramón Campos; Teresa Fernández-Valdés
- Production companies: RTVE; StudioCanal; Bambú Producciones

Original release
- Network: La 1
- Release: 12 January 2023 – present

La Promesa (English: The Vow) is a Spanish period television soap opera, based on an original idea by Josep Cister Rubio. It began airing in Spain on 12 January 2023 on La 1 of Televisión Española. Set in the fictional country estate of La Promesa, it depicts the lives of the aristocratic family of the marquises of Luján and their domestic servants, beginning in 1913.

On 25 November 2024, the series won the International Emmy Award for Best Telenovela.

== Premise ==
In 1913, Jana Expósito arrives in La Promesa palace (located in Los Pedroches) hellbent on avenging the death of her mother and on finding about the whereabouts of her younger brother. She meets Manuel (the younger son of Alonso Luján, the Marquess of Luján) and rescues him from a plane crash. Meanwhile bridegroom Tomás (the first born son of Alonso and the person willing to share information with Jana about her family), is stabbed by his stepmother Cruz Ezquerdo, Manuel's mother.

== Cast ==
- Ana Garcés as Jana Expósito
- Eva Martín as Cruz Ezquerdo, the Marquise of Luján
- Manuel Regueiro as Alonso Luján, the Marquis of Luján
- Arturo García Sancho as Manuel Luján
- María Castro as Pía Adarre
- Joaquín Climent as Rómulo Baeza
- Antonio Velázquez as Mauro Moreno
- Andrea del Río as Teresa Villamil
- Carmen Flores as Simona Martínez
- Teresa Quintero as Candela García
- Carmen Asecas as Catalina Luján
- Paula Losada as Jimena de los Infantes
- Alicia Bercán as Leonor Luján
- Alberto González as Juan Ezquerdo
- Marga Martínez as Petra Arcos
- Enrique Fortún as Lope Ruíz
- Laura Simón as Lola Montoro
- Sara Sánchez Molina as María Fernández
- Jordi Coll as Tomás

== Production ==
The series is a Radiotelevisión Española (RTVE) and StudioCanal co-production in collaboration with Bambú Producciones. Shooting locations included El Rincón palace in Aldea del Fresno and El Jaral de la Mira plot, as well as two soundstages with a total area of around 3,000 square metres (32,000 sq ft).

== Episodes ==
Season	Episodes	Originally released		Avg. viewers (millions)	Avg. share
Season	Episodes	First released	Last released	Avg. viewers (millions)	Avg. share
1	122	12 January 2023	20 June 2023	1.019	10.7%
2	119	20 June 2023	29 November 2023	1.055	11.9%
3	250	30 November 2023	24 December 2024	0.962	12.0%
4	250	26 December 2024	23 December 2025	0.998	13.4%
5	250	24 December 2025	TBA	TBA	TBA

== Release ==
The first two episodes premiered in prime time on La 1 in Spain on 12 January 2023. The regular sobremesa release began a day later on 13 January 2023. Following the good viewership figures of the 122-episode first season which wrapped on 20 June 2023, after which the 119-episodes second season began without pause, RTVE renovated the series for a 250-episodes third season. In July 2024, the series was renovated for a 250-episodes fourth season, and in September 2025, it was renovated for a 250-episodes fifth season.

RTVE distributes the series in the United States and Latin America, whilst StudioCanal handles distribution elsewhere. RTVE sold rights to the series to Warner Bros. Discovery for a HBO Max debut in the Latin-American region.

Mediaset purchased rights to La Promesa in Italy, with the series debuting on Canale 5 on 29 May 2023 with positive viewership figures. Throughout its first months on air, it enjoyed a good audience share (larger than in Spain) as high as 25% (20 June 2023). The series is also broadcast by Hrvatska radiotelevizija (HRT) on HRT 1 in Croatia, by Eesti Rahvusringhääling (ERR) on Eesti Televisioon in Estonia, by Yleisradio (Yle) on Yle Areena as La Promesa - Salaisuuksien kartano in Finland, by Latvijas Televīzija (LTV) on LTV1 as Solījums in Latvia,, and by Lietuvos nacionalinis radijas ir televizija (LRT) on LRT televizija as Pažadas in Lithuania.

== Accolades ==
=== Awards and nominations ===
Year	Award	Category	Result	R.
2023	62nd Rose d'Or Awards	Best Soap or Telenovela	Nominated	
2024	52nd International Emmy Awards	Best Telenovela	Won	
