= Ana Garcés =

Spanish actress (born 2000)

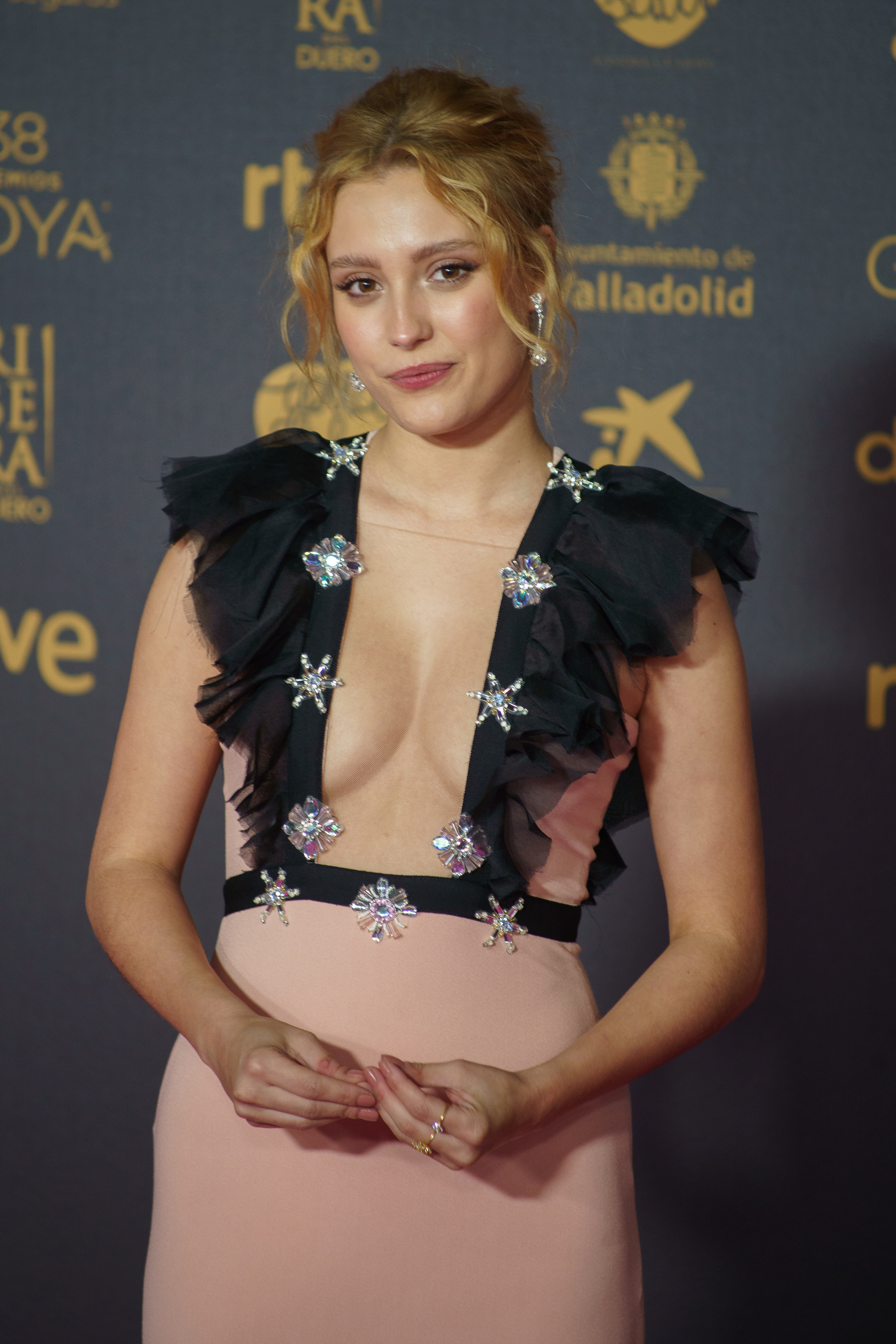
- Garcés in 2024
- Born: Ana Garcés Díez; 9 May 2000 (age 26); Valladolid, Castile and León, Spain
- Occupation: Actress
- Years active: 2018–present
- Known for: La Promesa

Ana Garcés Díez (born 9 May 2000) is a Spanish actress, known for playing the leading role of Mariana "Jana" Expósito in the soap opera La Promesa.

== Early life and education ==
Ana Garcés was born on 9 May 2000 in Valladolid, Castile and León. Besides Spanish, she is fluent in English. In 2018, Garcés took an acting course at the performing arts academy in Bratislava and, in 2019, obtained a diploma from the school of dramatic art of Valladolid. From 2018 to 2021, she attended the drama school of Valladolid, and upon completion of her studies, she received her degree. After graduation, to fulfill her dream of becoming a successful actress, she decided to move to Madrid, where she took part in various castings with the support of the Kailash agency.

== Career ==
Ana Garcés began acting in various shows such as El diluvio que viene, Don Juan (musical), Fuegos, The Seagull, Estrellas, The Seagull, and Friday. In 2018, she participated in the music video Guerra y Humo by Ecos de la Hysteria. The same year, she starred in the short films Alicia, Muerte en Vida, and La respuesta. In 2019, she played Duena 3 in the short film Señoras de Sijena directed by Tomás Generelo.

In 2021, she played Lili in the short film Los comedores de loto directed by Enrique García-Vázquez. For this performance, in 2022, she won the Best Performance award. In the following year, 2022, she played Nuria in the short film Quizás mañana directed by Lucía Lobato. The same year, she was part of the cast of the television film ¡Sálvese quien Putin! directed by José Mota and Isaac Cantero.

In Madrid, to earn a living, she started working as a sales assistant in a clothing store, where she remained for nine months until being selected for a casting. In 2023, she was chosen by TVE to play the leading role of Mariana "Jana" Expósito in the series La Promesa aired on La 1. In the same year she was included in the cast of the film Gallo rojo directed by Enrique García-Vázquez. In 2026, she plays a main character (Helena Martín Ruano) in the Netflix series Oasis.

== Filmography ==
=== Film ===
Year	Title	Role
2023	Gallo rojo	Enrique García-Vázquez

=== TV series ===
Year	Title	Role	Canal	Notes
2022	¡Sálvese quien Putin!			TV film directed by José Mota and Isaac Cantero
2023–2025	La Promesa	Mariana "Jana" Expósito	La 1	553 episodes
2026	Oasis	Helena Martín Ruano	Netflix	8 episodes

=== Short films ===
Year	Title	Role	Director
2018	Alicia		
2018	Muerte en Vida		
2018	La respuesta		
2019	Señoras de Sijena	Duena 3	Tomás Generelo
2021	Los comedores de loto	Lili	Enrique García-Vázquez
2022	Quizás mañana	Nuria	Lucía Lobato

=== Videoclip ===
Year	Title	Artist
2018	Guerra y Humo	Ecos de la Hysteria

== Theater ==
Year	Title	Author	Director	Adaptation	Theater
2014–2017	El diluvio que viene	Pietro Garinei, Sandro Giovannini and Iaia Fiastri			Cia Siluetas
2016–2017	Don Juan (musical)	Molière		Carlos Martín Sañudo	
2016–2017	Fuegos	Lorenzo Mattotti	Nina Reglero		La Nave Teatro Calderón (Valladolid)
2018	La gaviota	Antón Chéjov			
2019	Estrellas				Cia Siluetas
2019	The Seagull		Matus Bachynec		
2020	Friday		Marta Gómez		

== Awards ==
Year	Award	Category	Work	Results	Notes
2022		Best interpretation	Los comedores de loto	Won	
2023	Águila de Oro Award	Best actress	La Promesa	Won	
