= Manuel Regueiro =

Spanish actor (born 1968)

- Born: Manuel Regueiro; 21 December 1968 (age 57); Pontevedra, Galicia, Spain
- Occupations: Actor and singer
- Years active: 1999–present
- Known for: Acacias 38; El secreto de Puente Viejo; La Promesa

Manuel Regueiro (born 21 December 1968) is a Spanish actor and singer, known for playing the roles of Colonel Arturo Valverde in the soap opera Acacias 38, Ignacio Solozábal in the soap opera El secreto de Puente Viejo and Alonso de Luján in the soap opera La Promesa.

== Early life and education ==
Manuel Regueiro's home languages are Galician and Spanish, and he speaks French.

In 1991, he took a course in voice and acting for film dubbing, held at the Royal School of dramatic arts in Madrid. From 1993 to 1997, he studied acting at the School of dramatic arts, at the Palacio de Festivals in Santander. In 1998, he took a course in acting, singing and body expression at the company of the Madrid Dance Theatre.

In 2000, he took a dubbing course at J.D, a professional dubbing school for actors, with Javier Dotú. In 2002, he took an audiovisual interpretation course with Jaime Chávarri. In 2006, he took the Audiovisual Continuous Training Workshop with Iñaki Aierra. That same year, he took a training course for professionals with Juan Carlos Corazza.

== Career ==
In addition to acting, Regueriro also works as a singer and theatre performer.

Throughout his career, he has acted in several films, such as Leo in 1999, Terca vida in 2000, Navidad en el Nilo in 2002, Dot.com in 2007, La olimpo company in 2011, and Fenómenas in 2023. In addition to acting in films, he also took part in various television series such as in 2000 in Raquel busca su latio, in 2000 and 2007 in El comisario, in 2001 in Abogados, in Al salir de clase and in Esencia de poder, from 2002 to 2004 in Rias Baixas, in 2004 in Ana y los 7, in Hospital Central and in La sopa boda, in 2004 and 2005 in El pasado es mañana, in 2006 and 2007 in Arrayán, in 2008 in 700 euros una historia de amor, in La tira, in El porvenir es largo, in Hermanos y detectives, in Cazadores de hombres and in Herederos, in 2008 and 2009 in Hablan, kantan, mienten, in 2009 in Reliquias, in Supercharly, in Última hora and in O Nordés, in 2010 in Ángel o demonio and in Física o Química, in 2011 in Los 33 de atacama and in Mario conde los días de Gloria and in Hispania, la leyenda, in 2012 in Maltalobos, in Cuentame un cuento, in Bandolera and in Cuéntame cómo pasó, from 2013 to 2016 in O faro, cruce de camiños, in 2014 in Ciega a citas, ne Bajo sospecha and in El tiempo entre costuras, in 2016 in El final del camiños, in Serramoura and in Lobos e Cordeiros, in 2022 in Si lo hubiera sabido and Madres. Amor y vida, while in 2011 he starred in the miniseries La memoria del agua. In addition to television series, he has also acted in soap operas such as in 2006 in Amar en tiempos revueltos, from 2016 to 2018 in Acacias 38, in 2019 and 2020 in El secreto de Puente Viejo, in 2021 in Dos vidas and since 2023 in La Promesa.

He has also acted in television films such as in 2001 in Cota roja and in 2010 in Eduardo Barreiros o Henry Ford Español, and has also acted in short films such as in 20% in 2012 and in Vainilla in 2015.

== Filmography ==
=== Film ===
Year	Title	Role	Director
1999	Leo		José Luis Borau
2000	Terca vida		Fernando Huertas
2002	Navidad en el Nilo		Neri Parenti
2006	Dot.com.	Vicente	Luis Galvao Teles
2011	La olimpo company		Javier de Juan
2023	Fenómenas	Luis	Carlos Therón

=== TV series ===
Year	Title	Role	Notes
2000	Raquel busca su sitio	Teo	1 episode
2000, 2007	El comisario	Bermejo	1 episode
2001	Abogados		
2001	Al salir de clase	Juan	9 episode
2001	Esencia de poder		
2001	Cota roja	Félix	TV film directed by Jordi Frades
2002–2004	Rías Baixas	Diego Lantaño	2 episodes
2004	Ana y los 7	Dr. Ángel Fernández	1 episode
2004	Hospital Central	Orlando	2 episodes
2004	La sopa boda	Abogado Julia	3 episodes
2004–2005	El pasado es mañana	Diego Riva	7 episodes
2006	Amar en tiempos revueltos	Lorenzo	
2006–2007	Arrayán		
2008	700 euros una historia de amor	Lorenzo	9 episodes
2008	La tira		
2008	El porvenir es largo	Pedro	3 episodes
2008	Hermanos y detectives		1 episode
2008	Cazadores de hombres	Esteban Monfort	2 episodes
2008	Herederos	Jefe de Seguridad	2 episodes
2008	Hablan, kantan, mienten		38 episodes
2008–2009	HKM		
2009	Reliquias	Ferro	TV film directed by Toño López
2009	Supercharly		
2009	Última hora		
2009	O Nordés	Adrián	11 episodes
2010	Eduardo Barreiros o Henry Ford Español	Eduardo adulto	TV film directed by Simón Casal
2010	Ángel o demonio	Toño	1 episode
2010	Física o química	Paco	1 episode
2011	Los 33 de atacama		
2011	Mario con los Días de Gloria		
2011	Hispania, la leyenda	Bartar de Norba	3 episodes
2011	La memoria del agua	Ernesto Montemayor anciano	2 episodes
2012	Matalobos	Esteban Garrido	13 episodes
2012	Cuéntame un cuento	Gaspar	Episode La bella y la bestia
2012	Bandolera		2 episodes
2012	Cuéntame cómo pasó	Román Salcedo	1 episode
2013–2016	El Faro	Miguel	242 episodes
2014	Ciega a citas		3 episodes
2014	El tiempo entre costuras	Sr. Almeida	1 episode
2015	Bajo sospecha	Ricardo Esparza	3 episodes
2016	El final del camino	Conde Andrade	1 episode
2016	Serramoura	Daniel Bolaño	6 episodes
2016	Lobos e Cordeiros		
2016–2018	Acacias 38	Arturo Valverde	416 episodes
2019–2020	El secreto de Puente Viejo	Ignacio Solozábal	164 episodes
2021	Dos vidas	Óscar Mora	5 episodes
2022	Si lo hubiera sabido	Samuel Olivar	4 episodes
2022	Madres. Amor y vida	Francisco Javier Jiménez del Corral	5 episodes
2023–presente	La Promesa	Alonso de Luján	¿? episodes

=== Short films ===
Year	Title	Role	Director
2012	20%		Jacobo Bergareche
2015	Vainilla	Carlos	Juan Beiro

== Theater ==
Year	Title	Author	Director	Theater
2010–2011	El mercader de Venecia	William Shakespeare	Denis Rafter	Darek Theatre Company
2021	Sincronía (comedia de Amarga)		Sandra Marchena	Sala Plot Point

== Awards ==
Year	Award	Place	Work	Results
2012	Mestre Mateo Award		Eduardo Barreiros o Henry Ford Español	Won
2017	Mestre Mateo Award	WorldFest Houston International Independent Film Festival	Eduardo Barreiros o Henry Ford Español	Won
