= Coco Rebecca Edogamhe =

Italian actress (born 2001)

Rebecca Coco Edogamhe (born 5 September 2001), also known as Coco Rebecca Edogamhe, is an Italian actress best known as the star of the streaming Netflix series Summertime.

== Life and career ==
Edogamhe was born in Lecce and raised outside of Bologna to a Nigerian father and an Apulian Italian mother. She has one younger sister. She frequently traveled to visit family in Salento and Nigeria growing up.

Although Edogamhe never took acting classes, she began auditioning for film and television roles as a high school student. She booked her first professional acting job as the lead in the Italian Netflix series Summertime, a coming-of-age drama series set over summer break in a city on the Adriatic coast. The show debuted in April 2020, shortly before she graduated high school, and was received positively. The second season of Summertime was released in 2021.

She has modeled in editorial shoots for Gucci and Liu Jo.

== Filmography ==
Film
Year	Title	Role	Notes
2021	Le château du tarot	La Papesse	Short film
2022	Robbing Mussolini	Hessa	
2023	Colorcarne	Orlanda	Short film

Television
Year(s)	Title	Role	Notes
2020–2022	Summertime	Summer	Lead role
