= Laura Ledesma =

Spanish actress, singer and model (born 1993)

- Born: Laura Ledesma Alarcón; 2 June 1993 (age 32); Madrid, Spain
- Occupations: Actress; singer; model
- Years active: 2007–present
- Height: 1.69 m (5 ft 6.54 in)
- Website: Laura Ledesma; Laura Ledesma

Laura Ledesma Alarcón (born 2 June 1993) is a Spanish actress, singer and model.

== Biography ==
Laura Ledesma was born on June 2, 1993, in Madrid (Spain), in addition to acting, she is also dedicated to singing and theater and, in addition to Spanish, she is fluent in English and German.

== Career ==
Laura Ledesma began her career as an actress in 2007, thanks to the ORSON the KID school, she played the role of Nuria in the film Los veraneantes directed by Jorge Viroga. She trained in the studio of Juan Carlos Corazza El Centro del Attore or Prima Squadra. She has also taken several intensive courses in singing, dance and musical theater with Carmen Roche and Miguel Tubía. She has been working in the theater since 2012, where she produces, directs and acts for La Corona Producciones.

In 2010 she played the role of María Amparo Suárez Illana, the daughter of Adolfo Suárez, in the Antena 3 miniseries Adolfo Suárez, el presidente. In 2013 and 2014 she starred in the web series of YouTube Qué rabia da. In 2014 she played the role of Morenaza in the web series Hipsteria. In 2016 and 2017 she played the role of Isabel de Valois in the La 1 and BBC Queens: The Virgin and the Martyr (Reinas) series, shot in English.

In 2018 she starred in the film Diana with Ana Rujas and was nominated for the Goya Awards for Best Supporting Actress. The following year, in 2019, he lent his voice in the animated series La gallina Turuleca directed by Eduardo Gondell and Víctor Monigote.

In the summer of 2020, she played the role of Begoña in the Atresplayer Premium series Campamento Albanta. In 2021 and 2022 she was chosen by TVE to play the role of Julia María Infante Lou / Julia María Cruz Lou in the daily telenovela broadcast on La 1 Two Lives (Dos vidas) and where she acted alongside actors such as Amparo Piñero, Cristina de Inza, Oliver Ruano and Aida de la Cruz.

== Filmography ==
=== Actress ===
==== Film ====
Year	Title	Role	Director
2007	Los veraneantes	Nuria	Jorge Viroga
2018	Diana	Diana	Alejo Moreno

==== TV series ====
Year	Title	Role	Network	Notes
2010	Adolfo Suárez, el presidente	Mariam Suárez Illana	Antena 3	2 episodes
2013–2014	Qué rabia da		YouTube	2 episodes
2014	Hipsteria	Morenaza	MTV	1 episode
2016–2017	Queens: The Virgin and the Martyr (Reinas)	Isabel de Valois	La 1	6 episodes
2016–2017	Queens: The Virgin and the Martyr (Reinas)	Isabel de Valois	BBC	6 episodes
2020	Campamento Albanta	Begoña	Atresplayer Premium	6 episodes
2021–2022	Two Lives (Dos vidas)	Julia María Infante Lou / Julia María Cruz Lou	La 1	255 episodes

==== Short films ====
Year	Title	Role	Director
2011	La noche rota	Amiga	Diego Betancor
2018	Querida Alicia	Madre Nazaria	Pablo Moreno

=== Voice actress ===
==== Television ====
Year	Name	Director
2019	La gallina Turuleca	Eduardo Gondell and Víctor Monigote

== Theater ==
Year	Title	Director
2013	Los Monólogos de la Vagina	Flor Macías and Hannah Connor
2013	Adiós, Homo Sapiens	Pedro Jiménez
2013	Si me pongo en tu lugar	Rosa Morales
2013	La Audición	Pablo Iván Fernández Barahona
2014	Amor y Locura: escenas de Platonov	Paula Soldevila
2014	La mujer, el hombre y la libertad: escenas de Lorca e Ibsen	Juan Carlos Corazza
2014	Nuestra Señora del Mare Sirenum	Anita del Rey
2015	Leyendo a Shakespeare	Juan Carlos Corazza
2015	Hijos de Shakespeare	Juan Carlos Corazza
2016	Lecturas incompletas de Cervantes y Shakespeare. Retablo de una noche de trabajos	Paula Soldevila and Raúl de la Torre
2016–2017	Una Corona para Claudia (musical)	Iker Azcoitia
2017	Ecos	Alexandra Fierro
2022–2023	FAN	Eva Ramos and Laura Ledesma
2022–2023	La saga	Cristina Higueras
