= Ludovico Tersigni =

Italian actor and television host (born 1995)

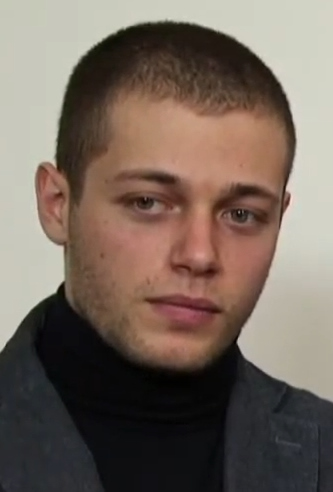
- Ludovico Tersigni in 2017
- Born: 8 August 1995 (age 29); Rome, Italy
- Occupation: Actor
- Years active: 2014–present

Ludovico Tersigni (born 8 August 1995) is an Italian actor.

== Biography ==
Tersigni was born in Rome and grew up in Nettuno; he graduated from the Chris Cappell College of Anzio.

In 2014, he made his acting debut in the film Arance & martello, directed by his uncle Diego Bianchi, which was presented at the 71st Venice International Film Festival. Two years later he starred in the role of Ale in Summertime, directed by Gabriele Muccino; since 2015 he has been part of the main cast of the Italian series Tutto può succedere, playing the role of Stefano Privitera.

In 2016, he was chosen to play Samuele, the main character of the film Slam, presented at the Turin Film Festival and then distributed in cinemas the following year. For his role, he learned skateboarding, thus making himself some of the tricks in the film.

In 2018, he made his breakthrough with the role of Giovanni Garau in the webseries Skam Italia. He was then cast as the male lead of the Italian Netflix production Summertime (2020–2022).

On 20 May 2021, he was announced as the new host of the fifteenth season of X Factor Italia, replacing Alessandro Cattelan. Since his hosting was poorly received by the public, he was not confirmed for the sixteenth season and replaced by Francesca Michielin.

== Awards and nominations ==
- 2017 – Guglielmo Biraghi Award for Slam at Nastri d'argento

== Filmography ==
=== Films ===
Year	Title	Role	Notes
2014	Arance & Martello	Ludovico	
2016	Summertime	Federico	
2017	Slam	Samuele	
2017	UPP	Guglielmo	Short film
2018	Aggrapati a me	Filippo	Short film
2022	Lightyear	Sox	Voice role

=== Television ===
Year	Title	Role	Notes
2015–2018	Tutto può succedere	Stefano Privitera	Main role; 42 episodes
2018–2022	Skam Italia	Giovanni Garau	Main role (seasons 1–2, 5), recurring role (seasons 3–4); 33 episodes
2020–2022	Summertime	Alessandro Alba	Lead role; 24 episodes

== Television programs ==
- X Factor (Sky Uno and TV8, 2021)
- Drag Race Italia (Discovery+ (Italy) and WOW Presents Plus, 2022)
