= Catalonia =

Nationality and autonomous community of Spain

Catalonia (Note: Pronunciation: English: /ˌkætəˈloʊniə/ Catalan: Catalunya [kətəˈluɲə], also [kataˈluɲa] Spanish: Cataluña [kataˈluɲa] Occitan: Catalonha [kataˈluɲa]): Catalunya (Catalan); Cataluña (Spanish); Catalonha (Occitan)
- Autonomous community
- Flag Coat of arms
- Anthem: Els Segadors (Catalan) ("The Reapers")
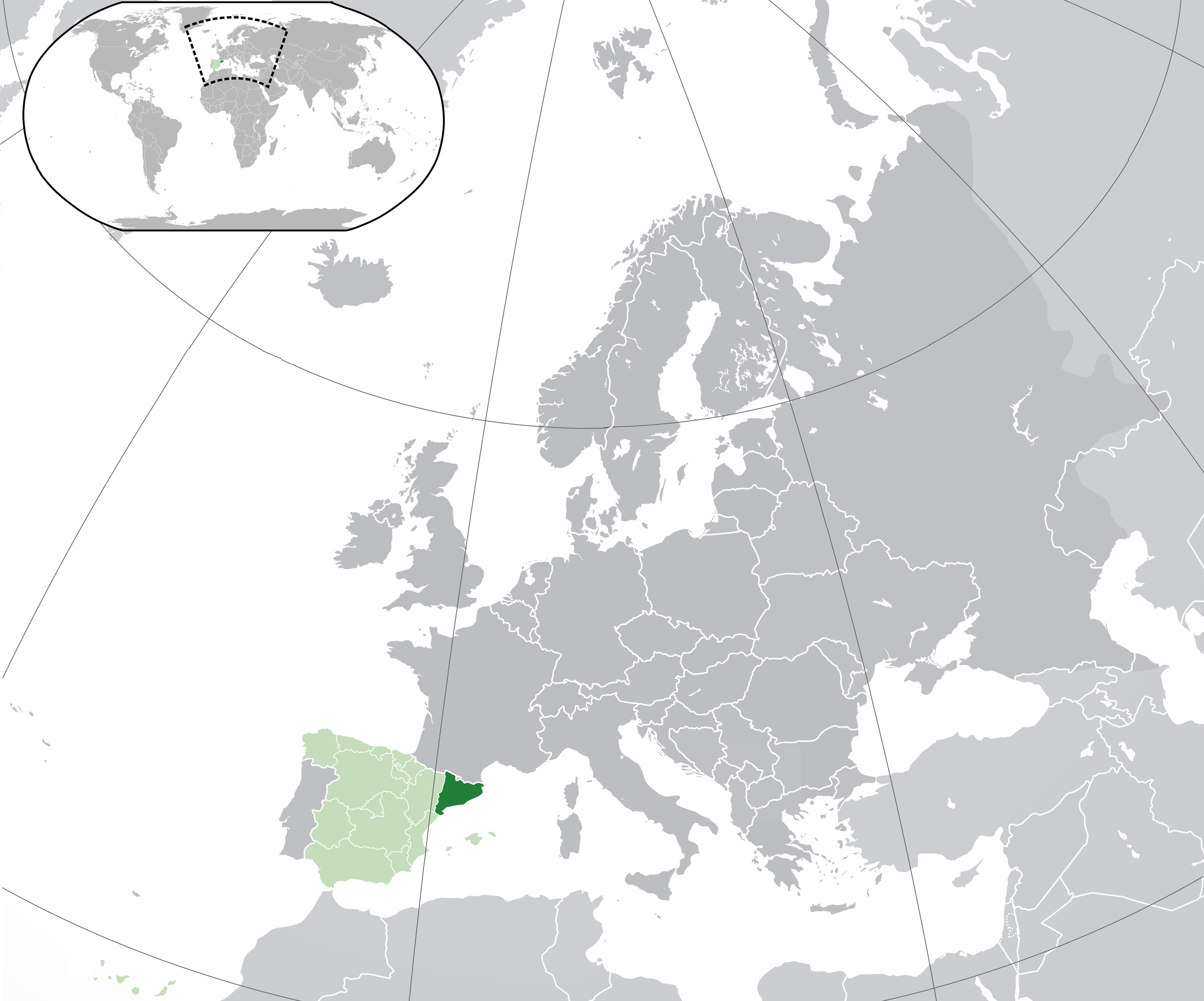
- Interactive map of Catalonia
- Coordinates: 41°51′N 1°34′E
- Country: Spain
- Formation: Main events: 801 (County of Barcelona); 1137 (Union with Aragon); 1173 (Legal definition); 1516 (Union with Castile); 1716 (Nova Planta); 1833 (Regionalisation); 1931 (Autonomous region); 1936 (Revocation of Autonomy); 1977 (Re-establishment of Autonomy)
- Statute(s) of Autonomy: Statute(s): 1932 (First Statute); 1979 (Second Statute); 2006 (Third Statute) (Note: In force - See Statute of Autonomy of Catalonia.)
- Capital (and largest city): Barcelona
- Largest metro area: Barcelona metro area
- Subdivision(s): Province(s): Province of Barcelona; Province of Girona; Province of Lleida; Province of Tarragona

Government
  - Type: Devolved government in a constitutional monarchy
  - Body: Generalitat de Catalunya
  - President: Salvador Illa (PSC)
  - Legislature: Parliament of Catalonia
  - Speaker: Josep Rull (Junts)

Area
  - Total: 32,112.65 km^{2} (12,398.76 sq mi)
  - Rank: 6th in Spain
- 6.3% of Spain
- Elevation: 559 m (1,834 ft)
- Highest elevation (Pica d'Estats): 3,143 m (10,312 ft)
- Lowest elevation (Mediterranean Sea): 0 m (0 ft)

Population (2025)
  - Total: 8,124,126
  - Rank: 2nd in Spain
  - Density: 252.9883/km^{2} (655.2368/sq mi)
- 16.5% of Spain
- Demonyms: Catalan or Catalonian • català, -ana (Cat.) • catalán, -ana (Sp.) • catalan, -a (Oc.)
- Official language(s): Catalan (Note: Catalan and Occitan (Aranese in Aran) are the languages of Catalonia and Aran (respectively) and official languages of the autonomous community of Catalonia according with its Statute of Autonomy.); Spanish (Note: As "the official language of the State", according with the Spanish Constitution.); Occitan (Aranese)

GDP
  - Total: €302.304 billion (2024)
  - Per capita: €37,477 (2024)

HDI
  - HDI (2022): 0.918 (very high · 5th)
- Time zone: UTC+1 (CET)
  - Summer (DST): UTC+2 (CEST)
- Postal code prefixes: 08XXX (B); 17XXX (GI); 25XXX (L); 43XXX (T)
- Telephone codes: +34 93 (Barcelona area) +34 97 (rest of Catalonia)
- ISO 3166 code: ES-CT
- Currency: Euro (€) (EUR)
- National day: 11 September
- Patron saint(s): Saint George; Virgin of Montserrat
- Website: gencat.cat

Catalonia is an autonomous community of Spain, designated as a nationality by its Statute of Autonomy. (Note: In addition to the legal definition as a nationality, Catalonia is also defined as a nation in the preamble of its 2006 Statute of Autonomy, although its effectiveness was challenged by the Constitutional Court of Spain in 2010, which declared this definition without legal force. However, the word was not modified nor suppressed, thus remaining in the text.) Its territory is situated on the northeast of the Iberian Peninsula, to the south of the Pyrenees mountain range. Catalonia is administratively divided into four provinces or eight vegueries (regions), which are in turn divided into 43 comarques. With a population of 8,124,126, it is the 2nd-most populous autonomous community of Spain, and the capital and largest city, Barcelona, is the 2nd-most populous city in Spain and the 5th-most populous urban area in the European Union.

Modern-day Catalonia comprises most of the medieval and early modern Principality of Catalonia, with the remainder of the northern area now part of France's Pyrénées-Orientales. It is bordered by France (Occitanie) and Andorra to the north, the Mediterranean Sea to the east, and the Spanish autonomous communities of Aragon to the west and Valencia to the south. In addition to its approximately 580 km of coastline, Catalonia also has major high landforms such as the Pyrenees and the Pre-Pyrenees, the Transversal Range (Serralada Transversal) or the Central Depression. The official languages are Catalan, Spanish, and the Aranese dialect of Occitan. Additionally, Catalan Sign language is recognized since 2010 upon Law 17/2010.

In 1137, the County of Barcelona and the Kingdom of Aragon formed a dynastic union, resulting in a composite monarchy, the Crown of Aragon. Within the Crown, Barcelona and the other Catalan counties merged into a state, the Principality of Catalonia, with its distinct institutional system, such as Courts, Generalitat, and Constitutions, being the base and promoter for the Crown's Mediterranean trade and expansionism. Catalan literature flourished. In 1516, Charles V became monarch of the crowns of Aragon and Castile, retaining both their previous distinct institutions and legislation. Growing tensions led to the revolt of the Principality of Catalonia (1640–1652), briefly as a republic under French protection. By the Treaty of the Pyrenees (1659), the northern parts of Catalonia were ceded to France. During the War of the Spanish Succession (1701–1714), the states of the Crown of Aragon sided against the Bourbon Philip V, but following Barcelona's capitulation (11 September 1714) he imposed a unifying administration across Spain via the Nueva Planta decrees which suppressed Catalonia's institutions and legal system, thus ending its separate status. Catalan as a language of government and literature was eclipsed by Spanish.

In the 19th century, Napoleonic and Carlist Wars affected Catalonia, however, it experienced industrialisation, as well as a cultural renaissance coupled with incipient nationalism and several workers' movements. The Second Spanish Republic (1931–1939) granted self-governance to Catalonia, restoring the Generalitat as its government. After the Spanish Civil War (1936–1939), the Francoist dictatorship enacted repressive measures, abolishing self-government and banning again the official use of the Catalan language. After a harsh autarky, from the late 1950s Catalonia saw rapid economic growth, drawing many workers from across Spain and making it a major industrial and touristic hub. During the Spanish transition to democracy (1975–1982), the Generalitat and Catalonia's self-government were reestablished, remaining one of the most economically dynamic communities in Spain.

In the 2010s until the 2020s, there was growing support for Catalan independence. On 27 October 2017, the Catalan Parliament unilaterally declared independence following a referendum that was deemed unconstitutional. The Spanish State enforced direct rule by removing the Catalan government and calling a snap regional election. The Spanish Supreme Court imprisoned seven former Catalan ministers on charges of rebellion and misuse of public funds, while several others—including then-President Carles Puigdemont—fled to other European countries. Those in prison (Note: Puigdemont is still wanted by the government in Madrid.) were pardoned in 2021.

== Etymology and pronunciation ==
The name "Catalonia" (Medieval Latin: Cathalaunia), spelled Cathalonia, began to be used for the homeland of the Catalans (Cathalanenses) in the late 11th century and was probably used before as a territorial reference to the group of counties that comprised part of the March of Gothia and the March of Hispania under the control of the Count of Barcelona and his relatives. The origin of the name Catalunya is subject to diverse interpretations because of a lack of evidence.

One theory suggests that Catalunya derives from the name Gothia (or Gauthia) Launia ("Land of the Goths"), since the origins of the Catalan counts, lords and people were found in the March of Gothia, known as Gothia, whence Gothland > Gothlandia > Gothalania > Cathalaunia > Catalonia is theoretically derived. During the Middle Ages, Byzantine chroniclers claimed that Catalania derives from the local medley of Goths with Alans, initially constituting a Goth-Alania.

Other theories suggest:

- Catalunya derives from the term "land of castles", having evolved from the term castlà or castlan, the medieval term for a castellan (a ruler of a castle). This theory therefore suggests that the names Catalunya and Castile have a common root.
- The source is the Celtic catalauni, meaning "chiefs of battle", similar to the Celtic given name *Katuwalos; although the area is not known to have been occupied by the Celtiberians, a Celtic culture was present within the interior of the Iberian Peninsula in pre-Roman times.
- The Lacetani, an Iberian tribe that lived in the area and whose name, due to the Roman influence, could have evolved by metathesis to Katelans and then Catalans.
- Miguel Vidal, finding serious shortcomings with earlier proposals (such as that an original -t- would have, by normal sound laws in the local Romance languages, developed into -d-), suggested an Arabic etymology: qattāl (قَتَّال, pl. qattālūn قَتَّالُون) – meaning "killer" – could have been applied by Muslims to groups of raiders and bandits on the southern border of the Marca Hispanica. The name, originally derogatory, could have been reappropriated by Christians as an autonym. This is comparable to attested development of the term Almogavar in nearby areas. In this model, the name Catalunya derives from the plural qattālūn while the adjective and language name català derives from the singular qattāl, both with the addition of common Romance suffixes.

In English, Catalonia is pronounced /kætəˈloʊniə/. The native name, Catalunya, is pronounced [kətəˈluɲə] in Central Catalan, the most widely spoken variety, and [kataˈluɲa] in North-Western Catalan. The Spanish name is Cataluña ([kataˈluɲa]), and the Aranese name is Catalonha ([kataˈluɲa]).

== History ==
=== Prehistory ===
The first known human settlements in what is now Catalonia were at the beginning of the Middle Paleolithic. The oldest known trace of human occupation is a mandible found in Banyoles, described as pre-Neanderthal, that is, some 200,000 years old; other sources suggest it to be only about one third that old. There are important remains from the Epipalaeolithic or Mesolithic, dated between 8000 and 5000 BC. The most important sites from these eras, all excavated in the region of Moianès, are the Balma del Gai (Epipaleolithic) and the Balma de l'Espluga. The Neolithic era began in Catalonia around 5000 BC, although the population was slower to develop fixed settlements thanks to the abundance of woods, which allowed the continuation of a fundamentally hunter-gatherer culture, for example, La Draga at Banyoles, an "early Neolithic village which dates from the end of the 6th millennium BC".

The Bronze Age occurred between 1800 and 700 BC. There were some known settlements in the low Segre zone. The Bronze Age coincided with the arrival of the Indo-Europeans through the Urnfield Culture, whose successive waves of migration began around 1200 BC, and they were responsible for the creation of the first proto-urban settlements. Around the middle of the 7th century BC, the Iron Age arrived in Catalonia.

=== Pre-Roman and Roman period ===
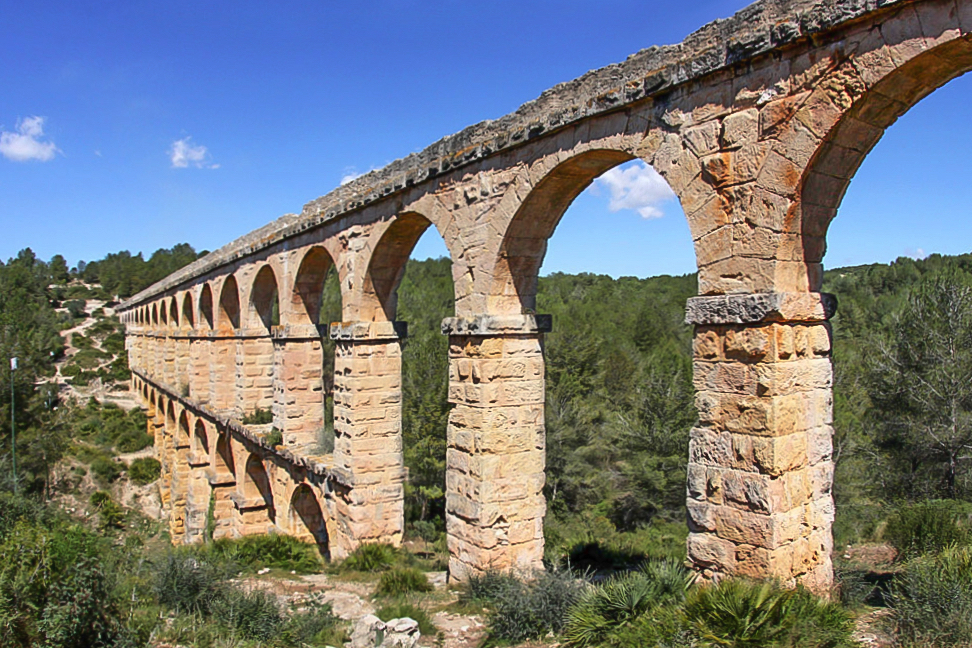
Les Ferreres Aqueduct, a Roman aqueduct surviving in Tarragona

In pre-Roman times, the area that is now Catalonia was populated by the Iberians, namely the Ilergetes, Indigetes and Lacetani (Cerretains), who also maintained relations with the peoples of the Mediterranean. Some urban agglomerations became relevant, including Lleida, Hibera (perhaps Amposta or Tortosa) or Indika (Ullastret). Coastal trading colonies were established by the ancient Greeks, who settled around the Gulf of Roses, in Emporion (Empúries) and Roses in the 8th century BCE.

After the Punic Wars, the victorious Roman Republic first took control of the northeast of Iberia and became part of Hispania, the westernmost part of the Roman Empire. Tarraco (now Tarragona) was one of the most important Roman cities in Hispania and the capital of the Roman province of Hispania Tarraconensis. Other important cities of the Roman period are Ilerda (Lleida), Dertosa (Tortosa), Gerunda (Girona) as well as the ports of Empuriæ (formerly Emporion) and Barcino (now Barcelona). As for the rest of Hispania, the Ius Italicum (jurisdiction of Roman law) was granted to all cities under the reign of Vespasian (69–79), while Roman citizenship was granted to all free men of the empire by the Constitutio Antoniniana in 212 (Tarraco, the capital, was already a colony under Roman law since 45 BCE). It was a rich agricultural province (olive oil, wine, wheat), and the first centuries of the Empire saw the construction of roads (the most important being the Via Augusta, parallel to Mediterranean coastline) and infrastructure like Roman aqueducts.

Conversion to Christianity, attested in the 3rd century, was completed in urban areas in the 4th century. Although Hispania remained under Roman rule and did not fall under the rule of Vandals, Suebi and Alans in the 5th century, the main cities suffered frequent sacking and some deurbanisation.

=== Middle Ages ===
After the fall of the Western Roman Empire, the area was conquered by the Visigoths and was ruled as part of the Visigothic Kingdom for almost two and a half centuries. the Muslim conquest of the Iberian Peninsula began in 711 and in 718, Catalonia came under Muslim control and became part of al-Andalus, a province of the Umayyad Caliphate. From the reconquest of the County of Roussillon in 760, to the 801 conquest of Barcelona, Francia took control of the area between Septimania and the Llobregat from the Umayyads and created heavily militarised, self-governing counties. These counties formed part of the historiographically known as the Gothic (Septimania) and Spanish Marches, a buffer zone in the south of Francia in the northeast of the Iberian Peninsula that would act as a defensive barrier against further invasions by the Umayyads, who had established the independent Emirate of Córdoba in 751 with the fall of the Caliphate to the Abbasid dynasty.

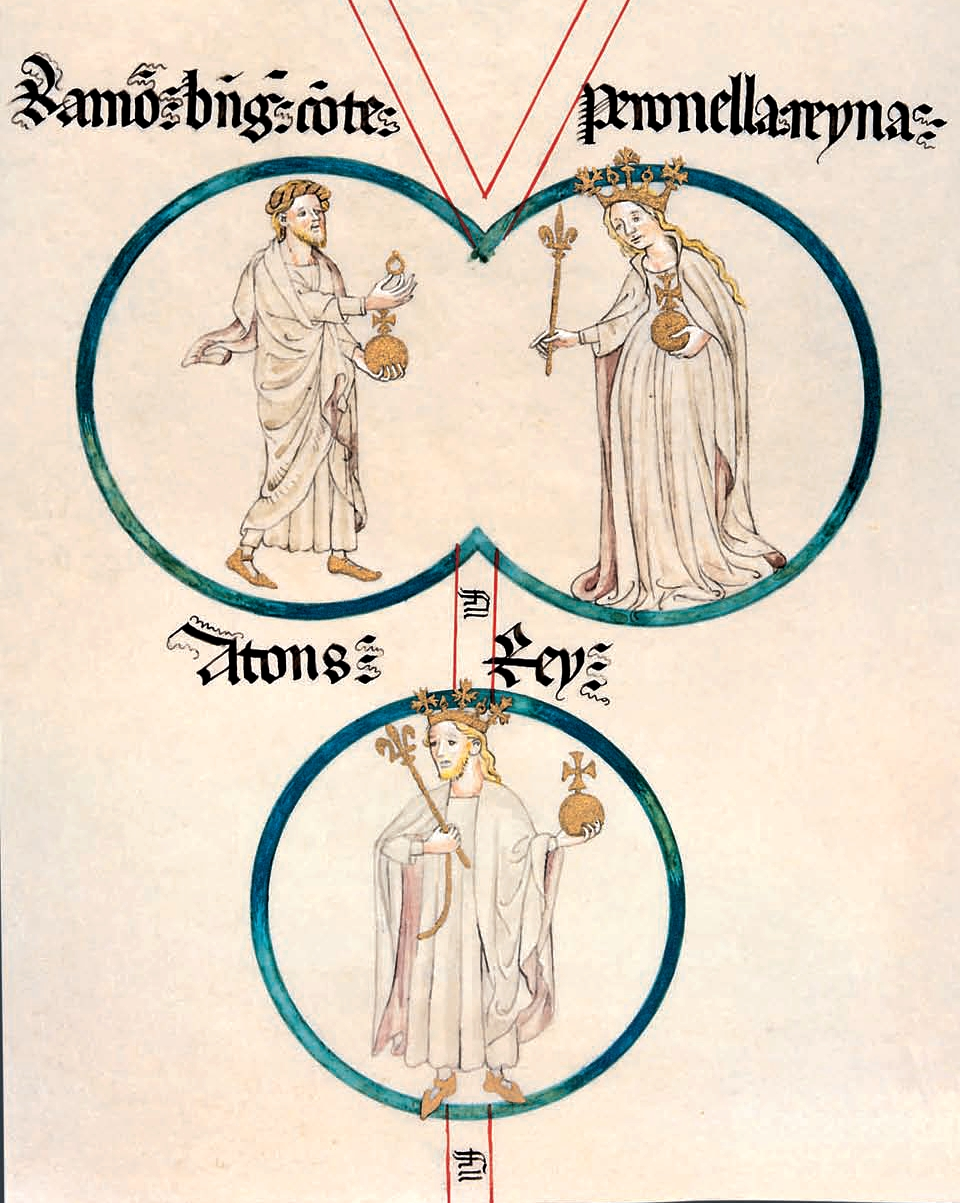
Ramon Berenguer IV of Barcelona (left), Petronilla of Aragon (right) and their son, Alfonso II of Aragon (bottom), dynastic union of the Crown of Aragon

The counties of the Marches came under the rule of the counts of Barcelona known as the Bellonids, who were Frankish vassals nominated by the Carolingian Empire and the successor state of Francia, to whom they were feudatories (801–988). At the end of the 9th century, the Bellonid Count of Barcelona, Wilfred the Hairy (878–897), made his titles hereditary and thus founded the House of Barcelona, which reigned in Catalonia until 1410.

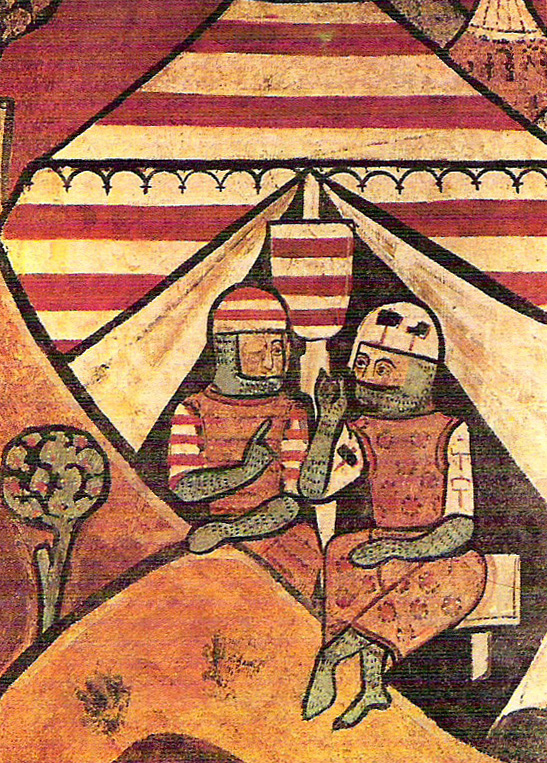
Ponç Hug IV, Count of Empúries, and Pero Maça during the conquest of Mallorca (1229)

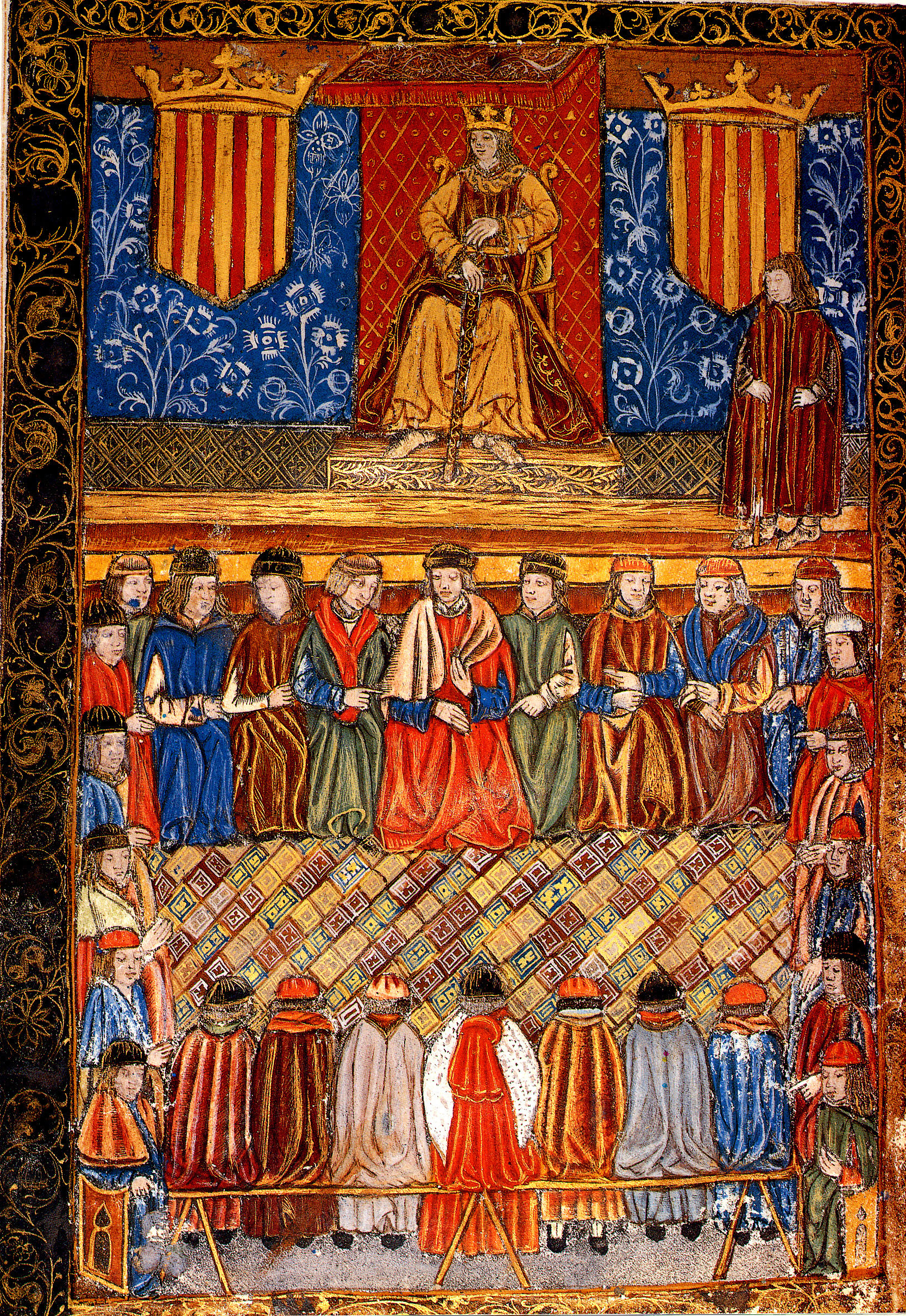
A 15th-century miniature of the General Court of Catalonia

In 988 Borrell II, Count of Barcelona, did not recognise the new French king Hugh Capet as his king, evidencing the loss of dependency from Frankish rule and confirming his successors (from Ramon Borrell onwards) as independent of the Capetian crown. At the beginning of eleventh century the Catalan counties experienced an important process of feudalisation, however, the efforts of church's sponsored Peace and Truce Assemblies and the intervention of Ramon Berenguer I of Barcelona (1035–1076) in the negotiations with the rebel nobility resulted in the partial restoration of the comital authority under the new feudal order. To fulfill that purpose, Ramon Berenguer began the modification of the legislation in the written Usages of Barcelona, being one of the first European compilations of feudal law. The earliest known use of the name "Catalonia" for these counties dates to 1117.

In 1137, Count Ramon Berenguer IV of Barcelona accepted King Ramiro II of Aragon's proposal to receive the Kingdom of Aragon and to marry Petronilla of Aragon, establishing the dynastic union of the County of Barcelona with Aragon, resulting in a composite monarchy later known as the Crown of Aragon, and making the Catalan counties that were vassalized or merged with the County of Barcelona into a principality of the Aragonese Crown under the House of Barcelona. During the reign of his son Alfonso, Catalonia was regarded as a legal entity for the first time in 1173, while the Usages of Barcelona were compiled in the process who would turn them into the law and custom of Catalonia (Consuetudinem Cathalonie), being considered one of the "milestones of Catalan political identity".

In 1258, by means of the Treaty of Corbeil, James I of Aragon renounced his family rights and dominions in Occitania, while the king of France, Louis IX, formally relinquished to any historical claim of feudal lordship he might have over the Catalan counties. This treaty confirmed, from French point of view, the independence of the Catalan counties already established the previous three centuries.

As a coastal land, Catalonia became the base of the Aragonese Crown's maritime forces, which spread the power of the Crown in the Mediterranean, turning Barcelona into a powerful and wealthy city. In the period of 1164–1410, new territories, the Kingdom of Valencia, the Kingdom of Majorca, the Kingdom of Sardinia, the Kingdom of Sicily, and, briefly, the Duchies of Athens and Neopatras, were incorporated into the dynastic domains of the House of Barcelona. The expansion was accompanied by a great development of the Catalan trade, creating an extensive trade network across the Mediterranean which competed with those of the maritime republics of the Genoa and Venice.

At the same time, the Principality of Catalonia developed a complex institutional and political system based on the concept of a pact between the estates of the realm and the king. The legislation had to be passed by the General Court of Catalonia (Corts Catalanes), one of the first parliamentary bodies of Europe that, after 1283, officially obtained the power to pass legislation with the monarch. The Courts were composed of the three estates organized into "arms" (braços), were presided over by the monarch, and approved the Constitutions of Catalonia, which established a compilation of rights for the inhabitants of the Principality. In order to collect general taxes, the Catalan Courts of 1359 established a permanent representative body, known as the Generalitat de Catalunya, which gained considerable political power over the next centuries.

Diachronic map of the Crown of Aragon. The Principality of Catalonia appears in light green.

The domains of the Aragonese Crown were severely affected by the Black Death and by later outbreaks of the plague. Between 1347 and 1497 Catalonia lost 37 percent of its population.

In 1410, the last reigning monarch of the House of Barcelona, King Martin I, died without legitimate heir. Under the Compromise of Caspe (1412), the representatives of the kingdoms of Aragon, Valencia and the Principality of Catalonia appointed Ferdinand from the Castilian House of Trastámara as King of the Crown of Aragon. During the reign of his son, John II, the persistent economic crisis and social and political tensions in the Principality led to the Catalan Civil War (1462–1472) and the War of the Remences (1462–1486), which left Catalonia exhausted. The Sentencia Arbitral de Guadalupe (1486) liberated the remença serfs from the feudal "evil customs".

In the later Middle Ages, Catalan literature flourished in Catalonia proper and in the kingdoms of Majorca and Valencia, with such remarkable authors as the philosopher Ramon Llull, the Valencian poet Ausiàs March, and Joanot Martorell, author of the novel Tirant lo Blanch, published in 1490.

=== Modern era ===
The Principality of Catalonia (1608 or 1612)

Ferdinand II of Aragon, the son of John II, and queen Isabella I of Castile were married in 1469, later taking the title the Catholic Monarchs; subsequently, this event was traditionally seen as the first step towards a unified Spain. At this time, though united by marriage, the Crown of Castile and the states of the Crown of Aragon remained distinct polities, each keeping its own institutions, parliaments, laws, jurisdictions, and currency. Castile commissioned expeditions to the Americas and benefited from the riches acquired in the colonisation of the Americas, but, in time, also carried the main burden of military expenses of the united Spanish kingdoms. After Isabella's death, Ferdinand II personally ruled both crowns. By virtue of descent from his maternal grandparents, Ferdinand and Isabella, in 1516 Charles I of Spain became the first king to rule the Crowns of Castile and Aragon simultaneously by his own right. Following the death of his paternal (House of Habsburg) grandfather, Maximilian I, Holy Roman Emperor, he was also elected Charles V, Holy Roman Emperor, in 1519.

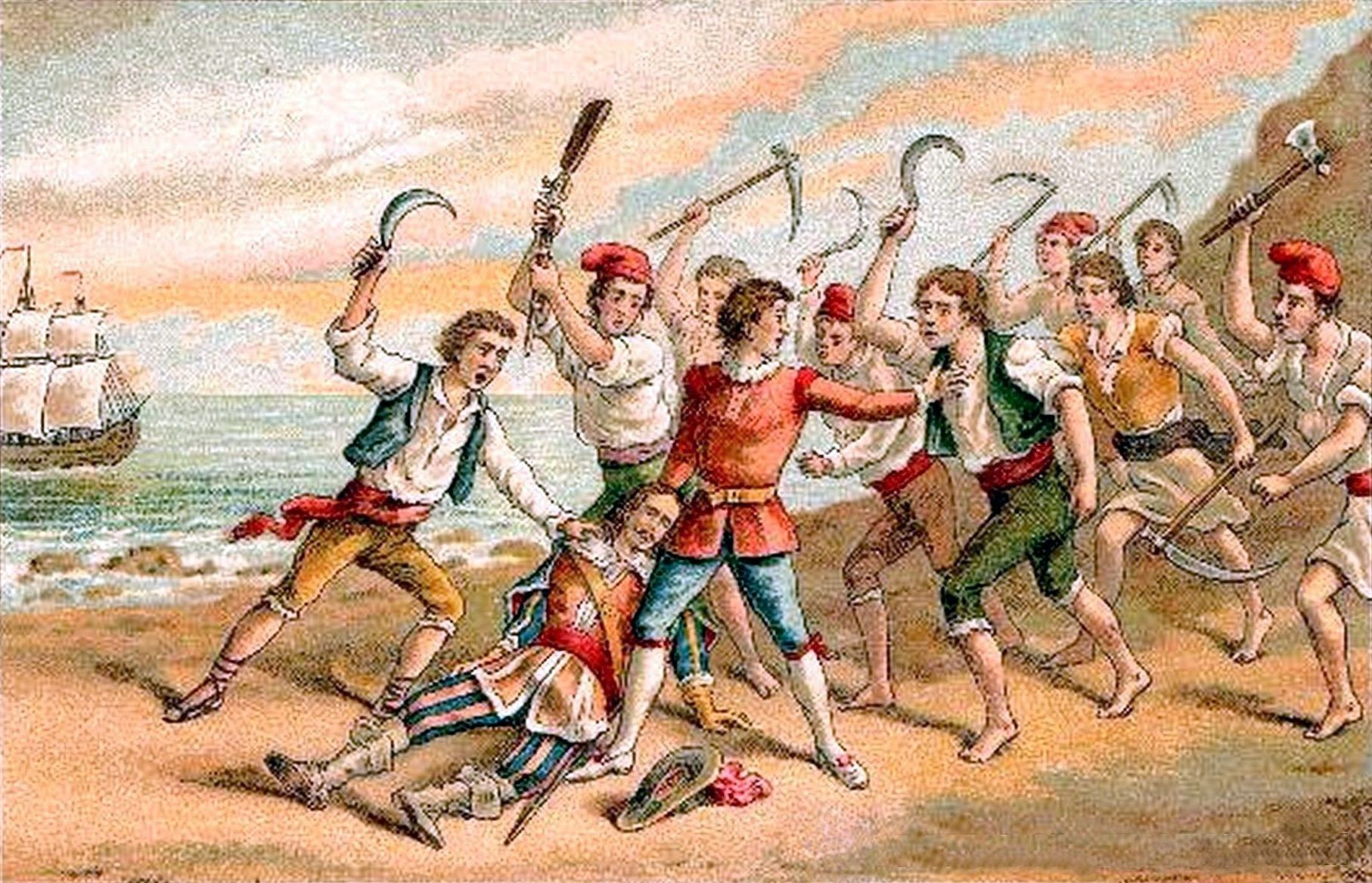
Corpus de Sang (7 June 1640), one of the main events of the Reaper's War. Painted in 1910

Over the next few centuries, the Principality of Catalonia was generally on the losing side of a series of wars that led steadily to an increased centralisation of power in Spain. However, between the 16th and 18th centuries, the participation of the political community in the local and the general Catalan government grew (thus consolidating its constitutional system), while the kings remained absent, represented by a viceroy. Tensions between Catalan institutions and the monarchy began to arise. The large and burdensome presence of the Spanish royal army in the Principality due to the Franco-Spanish War led to an uprising of peasants, provoking the Reapers' War (1640–1652), which saw Catalonia rebel, briefly as a republic led by the president of the Generalitat, Pau Claris with French help against the Spanish Crown for overstepping Catalonia's rights during the Thirty Years' War. Within a brief period France took full control of Catalonia. Most of Catalonia was reconquered by the Spanish monarchy but Catalan rights were mostly recognised. Roussillon and half of Cerdanya was lost to France by the Treaty of the Pyrenees (1659).

The most significant conflict concerning the governing monarchy was the War of the Spanish Succession (1701–1715), which began when the childless Charles II of Spain, the last Spanish Habsburg, died without an heir in 1700. Charles II had chosen Philip V of Spain from the French House of Bourbon. The Principality of Catalonia, like the other states of the Crown of Aragon, rose up in support of the Austrian Habsburg pretender Charles VI, Holy Roman Emperor, in his claim for the Spanish throne as Charles III of Spain. The fight between the houses of Bourbon and Habsburg for the Spanish Crown split Spain and Europe. After a series of advances and stalemates between the two sides, geopolitical changes in Europe led to peace. Philip V was internationally recognised as king of Spain by the Treaty of Utrecht (1713).

In July 1713 the Junta de Braços (council of Estates) of Catalonia opted to unilaterally remain in the war to protect Catalan constitutions and lives from Bourbon punishment, a brief but brutal conflict known as the War of the Catalans (1713–1714). The siege and capitulation of Barcelona (11 September 1714) ended Catalan resistance. In retaliation for the betrayal, and inspired by the French model, Philip enacted the Nueva Planta decrees (1707, 1715 and 1716), forcibly incorporating the realms of the Crown of Aragon, including the Principality of Catalonia in 1716, as provinces of Castile, terminating their status as separate states along with their parliaments, institutions and legal systems, within a French-style centralised and absolutist kingdom of Spain. After the War of the Spanish Succession, the assimilation of the Crown of Aragon in the Castilian Crown through the Nueva Planta Decrees was the first step in the creation of the Spanish nation state. These nationalist policies, sometimes aggressive, and still in force, have been and are the seed of repeated territorial conflicts within the state, although, a survey of language usage in 1807, commissioned by Napoleon, indicates that, except in the royal courts, Spanish was absent from everyday life. In the second half of the 17th century and the 18th century (excluding the parentheses of the Succession War and the post-war instability) Catalonia carried out a successful process of economic growth and proto-industrialisation, reinforced in the late quarter of the century when Castile's trade monopoly with American colonies ended.

=== Late modern history ===
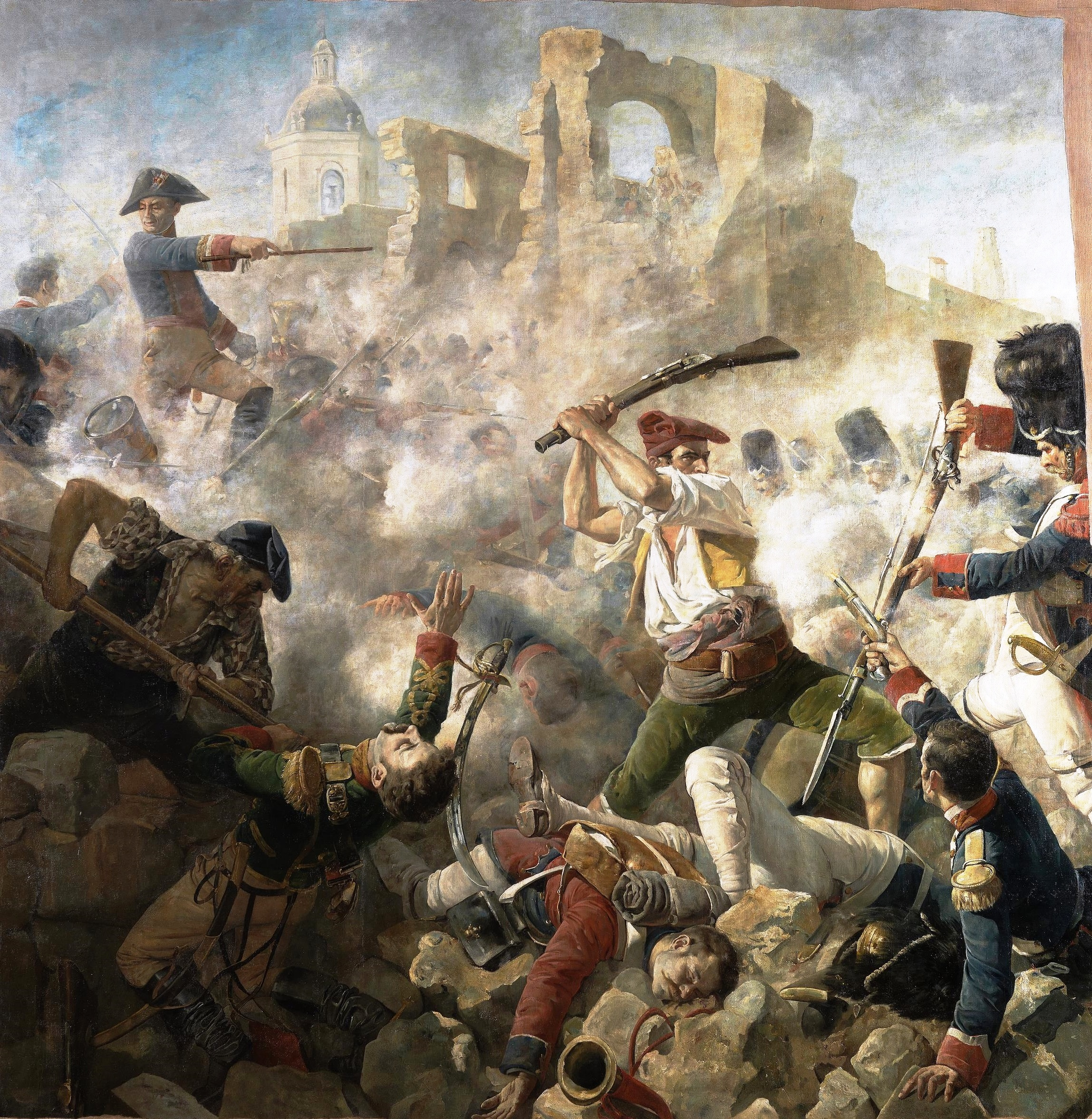
Third siege of Girona (1809), Peninsular War against Napoleon

At the beginning of the nineteenth century, Catalonia was severely affected by the Napoleonic Wars. In 1808, it was occupied by French troops; the resistance against the occupation eventually developed into the Peninsular War. The rejection of French dominion was institutionalised with the creation of "juntas" (councils) who, remaining loyal to the Bourbons, exercised the sovereignty and representation of the territory due to the disappearance of the old institutions. In 1810, Napoleon took direct control of Catalonia, creating the Government of Catalonia under the rule of Marshall Augereau, and making Catalan briefly an official language again. Between 1812 and 1814, Catalonia was annexed to France. The French troops evacuated Catalan territory at the end of 1814. After the Bourbon restoration in Spain and the death of the absolutist king Ferdinand VII (1833), Carlist Wars erupted against the newly established liberal state of Isabella II. Catalonia was divided, with the coastal and most industrialised areas supporting liberalism, while most of the countryside were in the hands of the Carlist faction; the latter proposed to reestablish the institutional systems suppressed by the Nueva Planta decrees in the ancient realms of the Crown of Aragon. The consolidation of the liberal state saw a new provincial division of Spain, including Catalonia, which was divided into four provinces (Barcelona, Girona, Lleida and Tarragona).

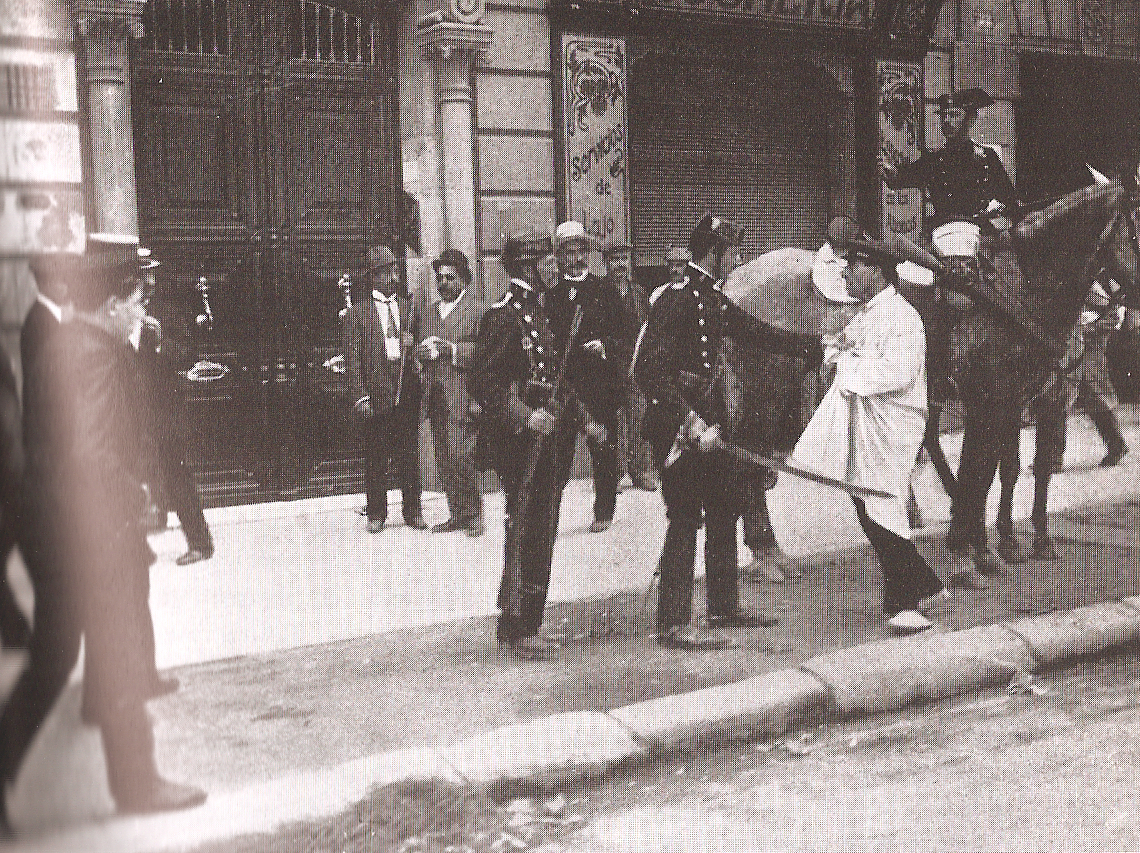
Suspects rounded up by the Civil Guard during the Tragic Week, 1909

In the second third of the 19th century, Catalonia became an important industrial center, particularly focused on textiles. This process was a consequence of the conditions of proto-industrialisation of textile production in the prior two centuries, growing capital from wine and brandy export, and was later boosted by the government support for domestic manufacturing. In 1832, the Bonaplata Factory in Barcelona became the first factory in the country to make use of the steam engine. The first railway on the Iberian Peninsula was built between Barcelona and Mataró in 1848. A policy to encourage company towns also saw the textile industry flourish in the countryside in the 1860s and 1870s. Although the policy of Spanish governments oscillated between free trade and protectionism, protectionist laws become more common. To this day Catalonia remains one of the most industrialised areas of Spain.

During the 19th century, as well as other Spaniards, there were Catalan business involved in the Atlantic slave trade and in the owning and management of slave plantations in Cuba and Puerto Rico. Between 1817 and 1867, they were involved in the transportation of 550,000 to 700,000 slaves from West Africa to the Caribbean. The Spanish government turned a blind eye to illicit slave trading. When slavery was abolished in 1886, various other Spaniards, the "indianos", as well as Catalans returned and invested their fortunes in constructing mansions in areas such as La Rambla.

At the same time, Barcelona was the focus of industrial conflict and revolutionary uprisings known as "bullangues". In Catalonia, a republican trend began to develop among the progressives, attracting many Catalans who favored the federalisation of Spain. Meanwhile, the Catalan language saw a Romantic cultural renaissance from the second third of the century onwards, the Renaixença, among both the working class and the bourgeoisie. Right after the fall of the First Spanish Republic (1873–1874) and the subsequent restoration of the Bourbon dynasty (1874), Catalan nationalism began to be organised politically under the leadership of the republican federalist Valentí Almirall.

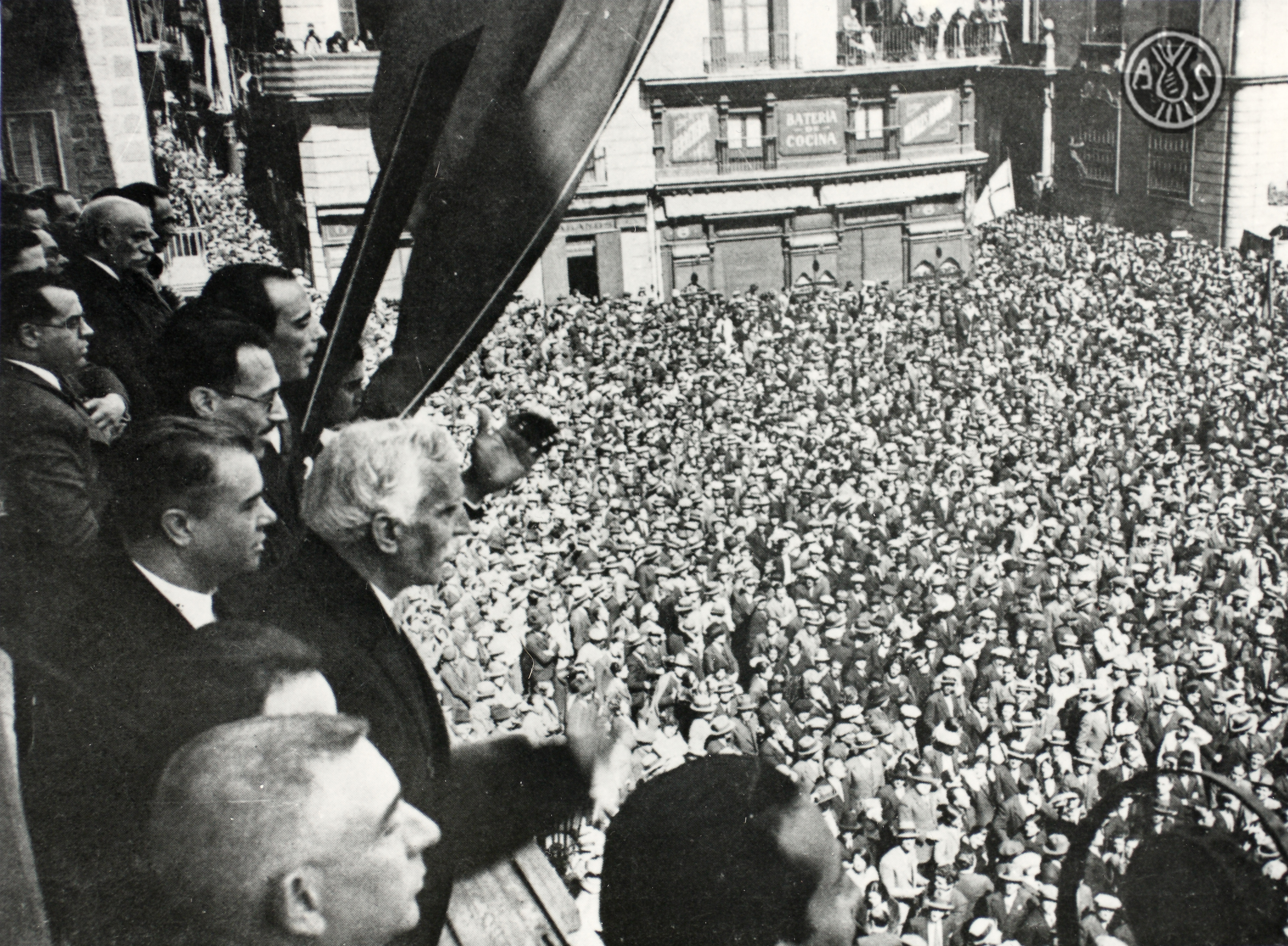
Francesc Macià proclaiming the Catalan Republic on 14 April 1931 in Barcelona

The anarchist movement had been active throughout the last quarter of the 19th century and the early 20th century, founding the CNT trade union in 1910 and achieving one of the first eight-hour workdays in Europe in 1919. Growing resentment of conscription and of the military culminated in the Tragic Week (Catalan: Setmana Tràgica) in Barcelona in 1909. Under the hegemony of the Regionalist League, Catalonia gained a degree of administrative unity for the first time in the Modern era. In 1914, the four Catalan provinces were authorised to create a commonwealth (Catalan: Mancomunitat), lacking legislative power or political autonomy, which carried out an ambitious program of modernisation, but it was disbanded in 1925 by the dictatorship of Primo de Rivera (1923–1930). During the final stage of the Dictatorship, with Spain beginning to suffer an economic crisis, Barcelona hosted the 1929 International Exposition.

After the end of the dictatorship and a brief proclamation of the Catalan Republic, during the events of the proclamation of the Second Spanish Republic (14–17 April 1931), Catalonia received, in 1932, its first Statute of Autonomy from the Spanish Republic's Parliament, granting it a considerable degree of self-governance, establishing an autonomous body, the Generalitat of Catalonia, which included a parliament. The left-wing pro-independence leader Francesc Macià was appointed its first president. Under the Statute, Catalan became an official language. The governments of the Republican Generalitat, led by the Republican Left of Catalonia (ERC) leaders Francesc Macià (1931–1933) and Lluís Companys (1933–1940), sought to implement a modernizing and progressive social agenda, despite the internal difficulties. This period was marked by political unrest, the effects of the economic crisis and their social repercussions. The Statute of Autonomy was suspended in 1934, due to the Events of 6 October in Barcelona, after the accession of right-wing Spanish nationalist party CEDA to the government of the Republic, considered close to fascism. After the electoral victory of the left wing Popular Front in February 1936, the Government of Catalonia was pardoned and the self-government was restored.

=== Spanish Civil War (1936–1939) and Franco's rule (1939–1975) ===
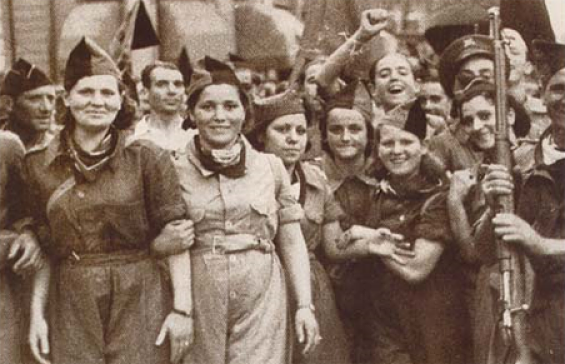
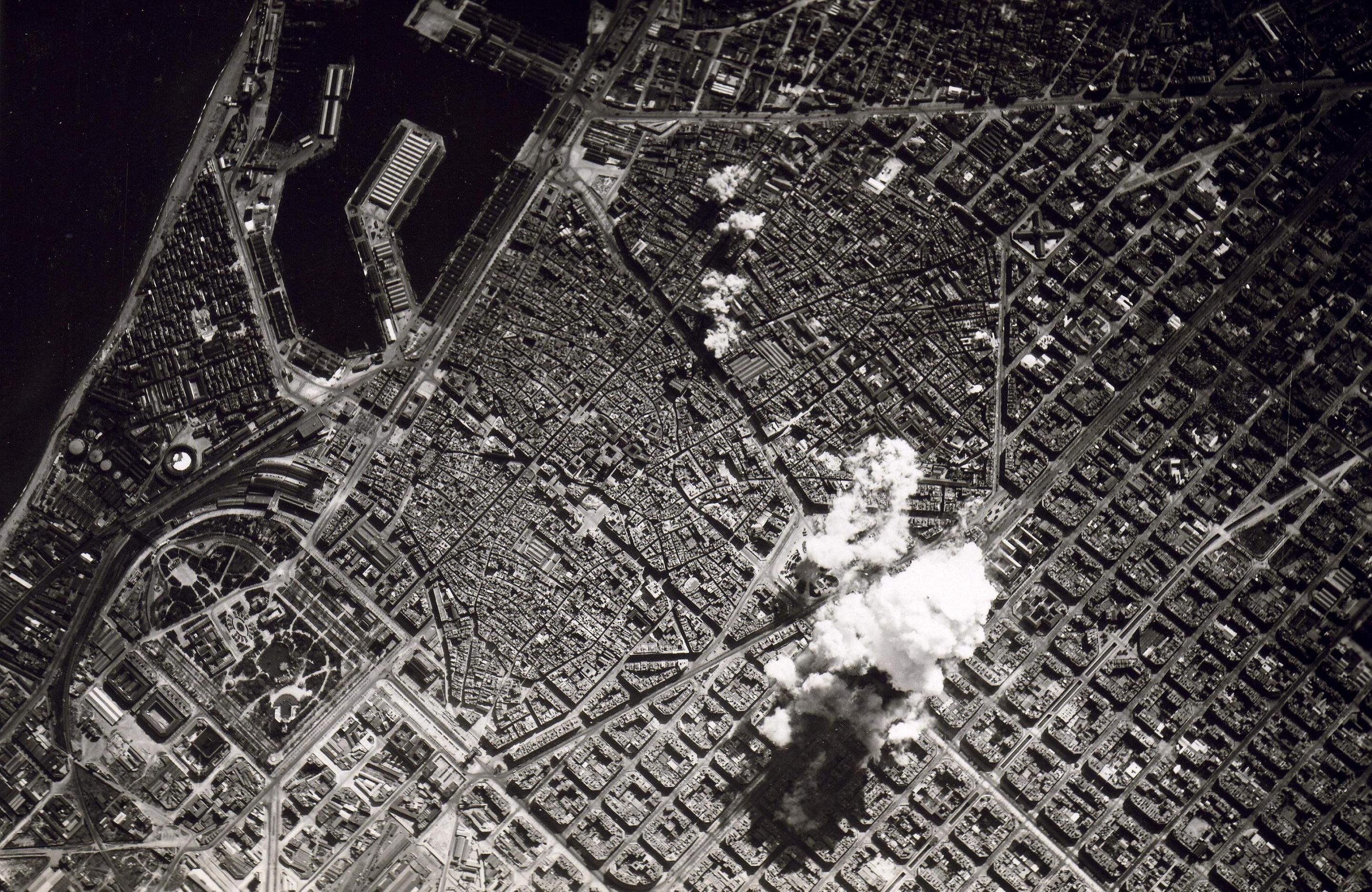
Left: Anarchist militia during the Revolution of 1936. Right: Bombing of Barcelona (1938)

The defeat of the military rebellion against the Republican government in Barcelona placed Catalonia firmly in the Republican side of the Spanish Civil War. During the war, there were two rival powers in Catalonia: the de jure power of the Generalitat and the de facto power of the armed popular militias. Violent confrontations between the workers' parties (CNT-FAI and POUM against the PSUC) culminated in the defeat of the former in 1937. The situation resolved itself progressively in favor of the Generalitat, but at the same time the Generalitat lost most of its autonomous powers within Republican Spain. In 1938 Franco's troops broke the Republican territory in two, isolating Catalonia from the rest of the Republican territory. The defeat of the Republican army in the Battle of the Ebro led in 1938 and 1939 to the occupation of Catalonia by Franco's forces.

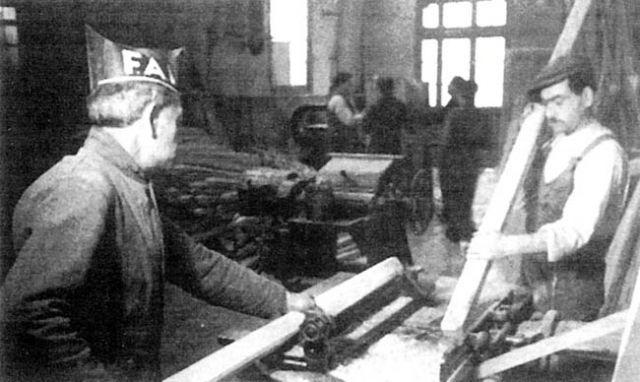
CNT-FAI worker cooperative in Barcelona producing wood and steel products

The defeat of the Spanish Republic in the Spanish Civil War brought to power the dictatorship of Francisco Franco, whose first ten-year rule was particularly violent, autocratic, and repressive both in a political, cultural, social, and economical sense. In Catalonia, any kind of public activities associated with Catalan nationalism, republicanism, anarchism, socialism, liberalism, democracy or communism, including the publication of books on those subjects or simply discussion of them in open meetings, was banned. Franco's regime banned the use of Catalan in government-run institutions and during public events, and the Catalan institutions of self-government were abolished. The president of Catalonia, Lluís Companys, was taken to Spain from his exile in the German-occupied France and was tortured and executed in the Montjuïc Castle of Barcelona for the crime of 'military rebellion'.

During later stages of Francoist Spain, certain folkloric and religious celebrations in Catalan resumed and were tolerated. Use of Catalan in the mass media had been forbidden but was permitted from the early 1950s in the theatre. Despite the ban during the first years and the difficulties of the next period, publishing in Catalan continued throughout his rule.

The years after the war were extremely hard. Catalonia, like many other parts of Spain, had been devastated by the war. Recovery from the war damage was slow and made more difficult by the international trade embargo and the autarkic politics of Franco's regime. By the late 1950s, the region had recovered its pre-war economic levels and in the 1960s was the second-fastest growing economy in the world in what became known as the Spanish miracle. During this period there was a spectacular growth of industry and tourism in Catalonia that drew large numbers of workers to the region from across Spain and made the area around Barcelona one of Europe's largest industrial metropolitan areas.

=== Transition and democratic period (1975–present) ===
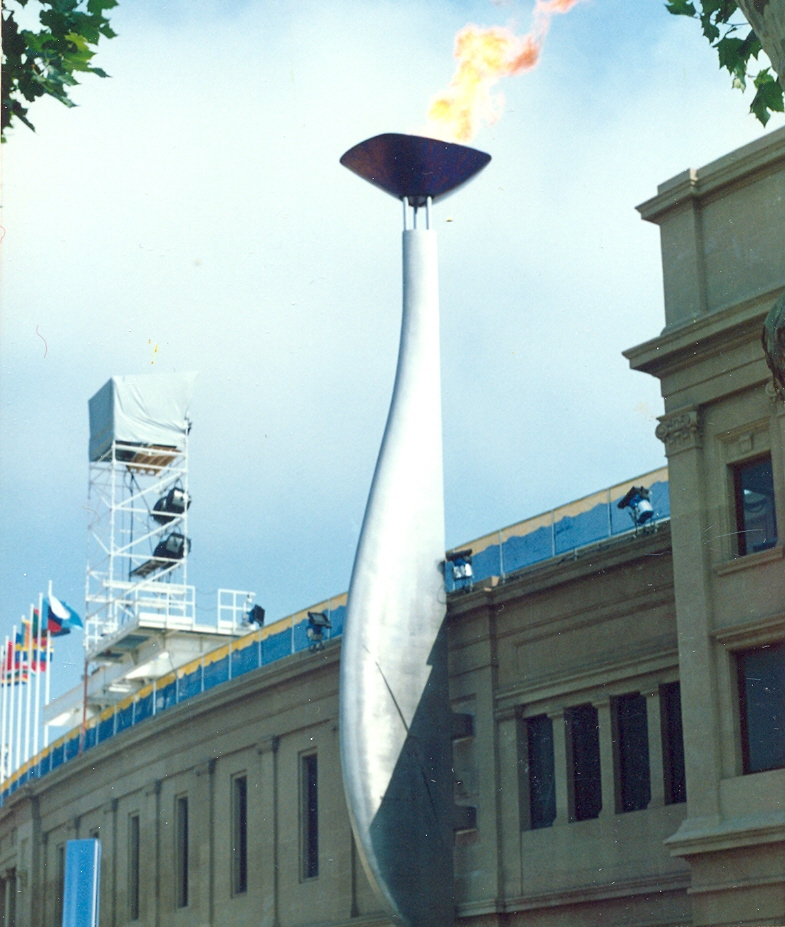
The Olympic flame in the Olympic Stadium Lluís Companys of Barcelona during the 1992 Summer Olympics

After Franco's death in 1975, Catalonia voted for the adoption of a democratic Spanish Constitution in 1978, in which Catalonia recovered political and cultural autonomy, restoring the Generalitat (exiled since the end of the Civil War in 1939) in 1977 and adopting a new Statute of Autonomy in 1979, which defined Catalonia as a "nationality". The first elections to the Parliament of Catalonia under this Statute gave the Catalan presidency to Jordi Pujol, leader of Convergència i Unió (CiU), a center-right Catalan nationalist electoral coalition, with Pujol re-elected until 2003. Throughout the 1980s and 1990s, the institutions of Catalan autonomy were deployed, among them an autonomous police force, the Mossos d'Esquadra, in 1983, and the broadcasting network Televisió de Catalunya and its first channel TV3, created in 1983. An extensive program of normalisation of Catalan language was carried out. Today, Catalonia remains one of the most economically dynamic communities of Spain. The Catalan capital and largest city, Barcelona, is a major international cultural centre and a major tourist destination. In 1992, Barcelona hosted the Summer Olympic Games.

==== Independence movement ====
In November 2003, elections to the Parliament of Catalonia gave the government to a left-wing Catalanist coalition formed by the Socialists' Party of Catalonia (PSC-PSOE), Republican Left of Catalonia (ERC) and Initiative for Catalonia Greens (ICV), and the socialist Pasqual Maragall was appointed president. The new government prepared a bill for a new Statute of Autonomy, aiming to consolidate and to expand self-government.

The new Statute of Autonomy of Catalonia, approved after a referendum in 2006, was contested by important sectors of Spanish society, especially by the conservative People's Party, which sent the law to the Constitutional Court of Spain. In 2010, the Court ruled non-valid various articles establishing an autonomous Catalan system of Justice, improved financing, a new territorial division, the protected status of Catalan language, the recovering of historical rights via Constitution's First Additional Provision or the symbolical declaration of Catalonia as a nation. This decision was severely contested by large sectors of Catalan society, which increased the demands of independence.

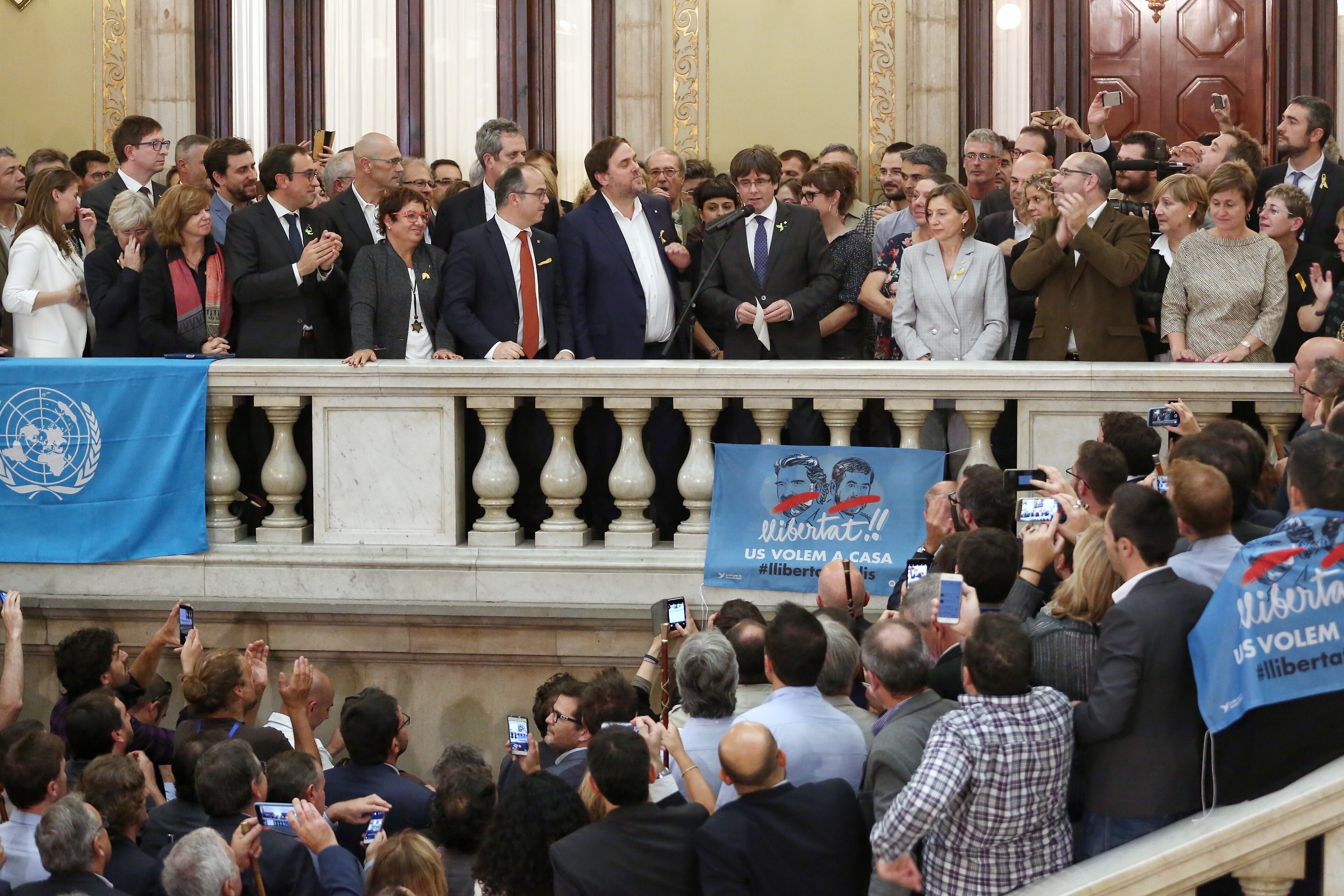
Catalan president, Carles Puigdemont, addresses the crowd following the unilateral declaration of independence on 27 October.

A controversial independence referendum was held in Catalonia on 1 October 2017, using a disputed voting process. It was declared illegal and suspended by the Constitutional Court of Spain, because it breached the 1978 Constitution. Subsequent developments saw, on 27 October 2017, a symbolic declaration of independence by the Parliament of Catalonia, the enforcement of direct rule by the Spanish government through the use of Article 155 of the Constitution, the dismissal of the Executive Council and the dissolution of the Parliament, with a snap regional election called for 21 December 2017, which ended with a victory of pro-independence parties. Former President Carles Puigdemont and five former cabinet ministers fled Spain and took refuge in other European countries (such as Belgium, in Puigdemont's case), whereas nine other cabinet members, including vice-president Oriol Junqueras, were sentenced to prison under various charges of rebellion, sedition, and misuse of public funds. Quim Torra became the 131st President of the Government of Catalonia on 17 May 2018, after the Spanish courts blocked three other candidates.

In 2018, the Assemblea Nacional Catalana joined the Unrepresented Nations and Peoples Organization (UNPO) on behalf of Catalonia.

On 14 October 2019, the Spanish Supreme court sentenced several Catalan political leaders, involved in organizing a referendum on Catalonia's independence from Spain, and convicted them on charges ranging from sedition to misuse of public funds, with sentences ranging from 9 to 13 years in prison. This decision sparked demonstrations around Catalonia. They were later pardoned by the Spanish government and left prison in June 2021. In the early-to-mid 2020s support for independence declined to 40% in favour, with support for dropping significantly, with the left-wing unionist Socialists' Party of Catalonia (PSC-PSOE) returning to office in the May 2024 elections.

== Geography ==
=== Topography ===
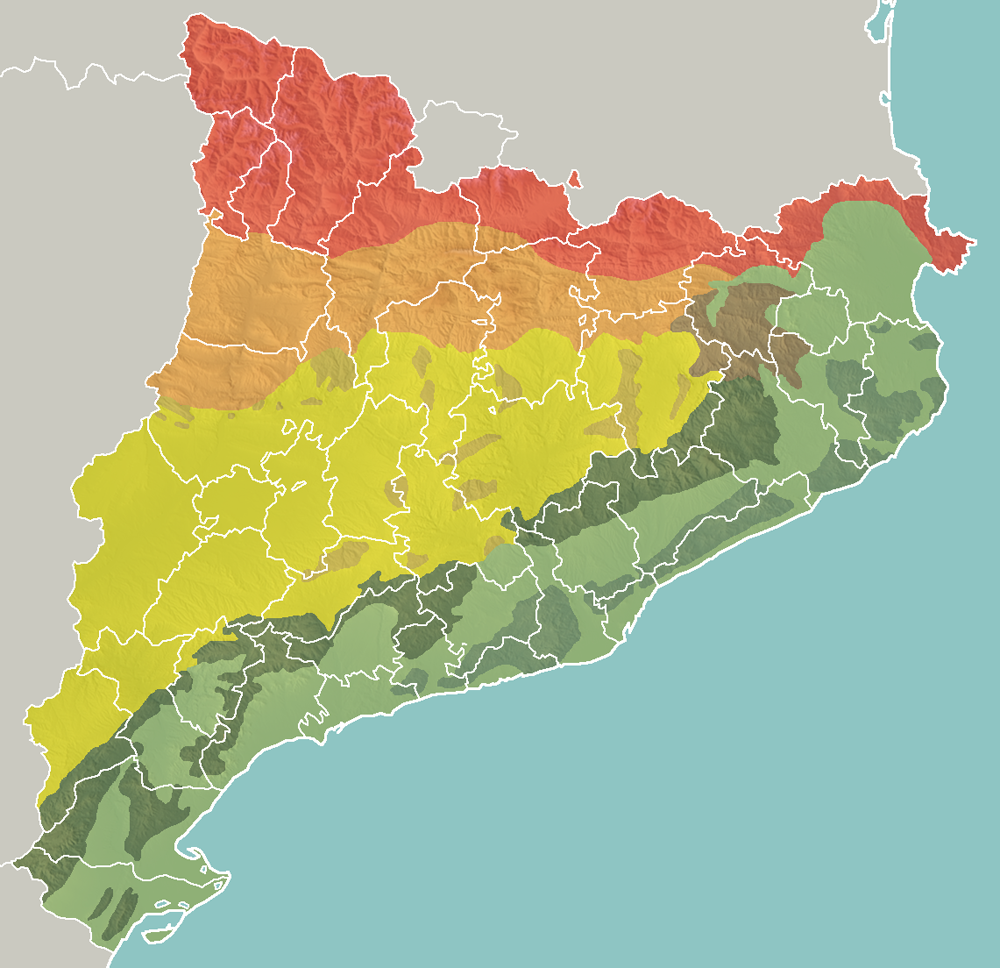
Geomorphologic map of Catalonia: Pyrenees; Pre-Pyrenees; Catalan Central Depression; Smaller mountain ranges of the Central Depression; Catalan Transversal Range; Catalan Pre-Coastal Range; Catalan Coastal Range; Catalan Coastal Depression and other coastal and pre-coastal plains

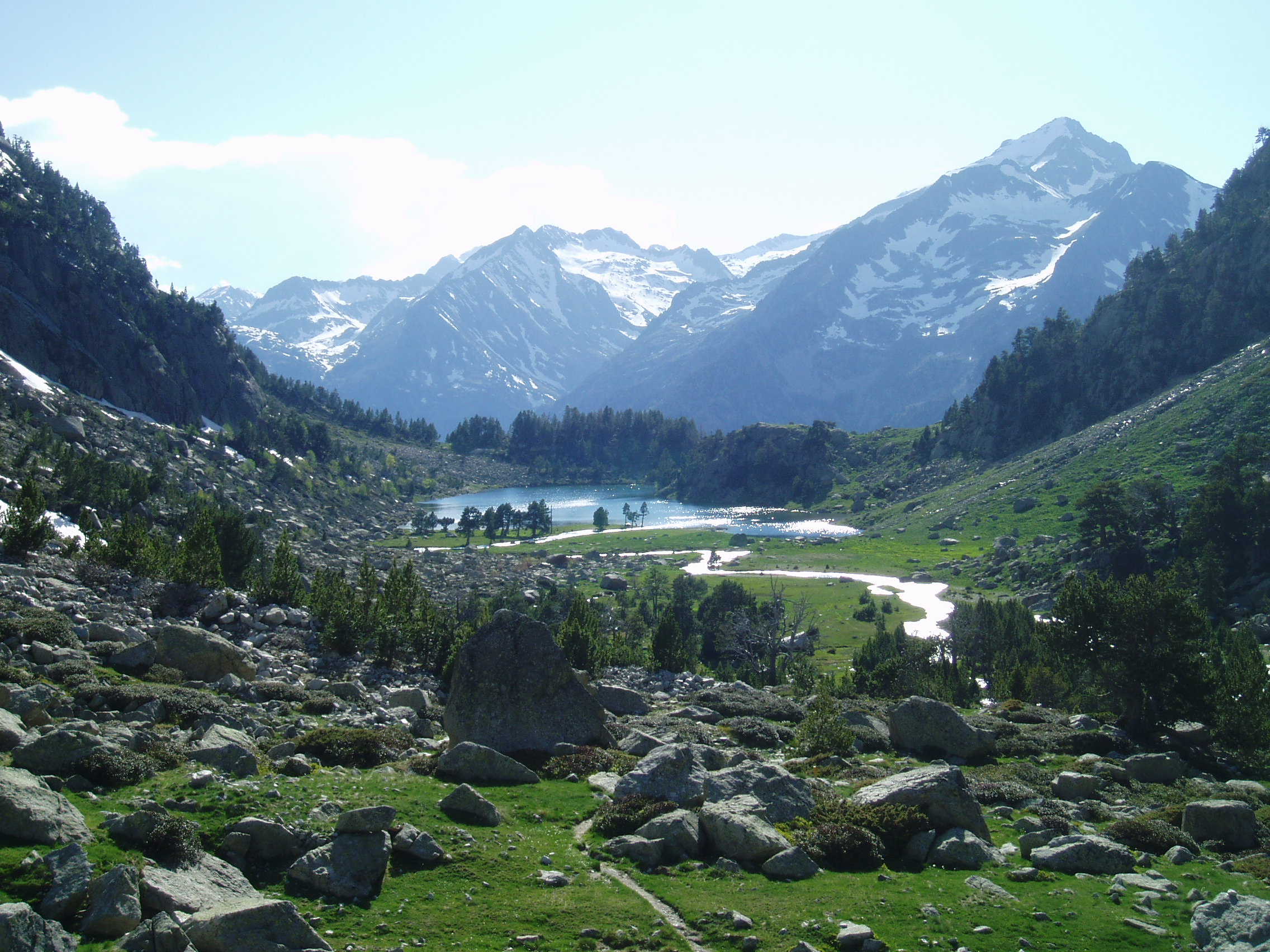
Besiberri in Catalan Pyrenees

Catalonia has a marked geographical diversity, considering the relatively small size of its territory. The geography is conditioned by the Mediterranean coast, with 580 kilometres (360 miles) of coastline, and the towering Pyrenees along the long northern border. Catalonia is divided into three main geomorphological units:

- The Pyrenees: mountainous formation that connects the Iberian Peninsula with the European continental territory (see passage above);
- The Catalan Coastal mountain ranges or the Catalan Mediterranean System: an alternating elevations and planes parallel to the Mediterranean coast;
- The Catalan Central Depression: structural unit which forms the eastern sector of the Valley of the Ebro.

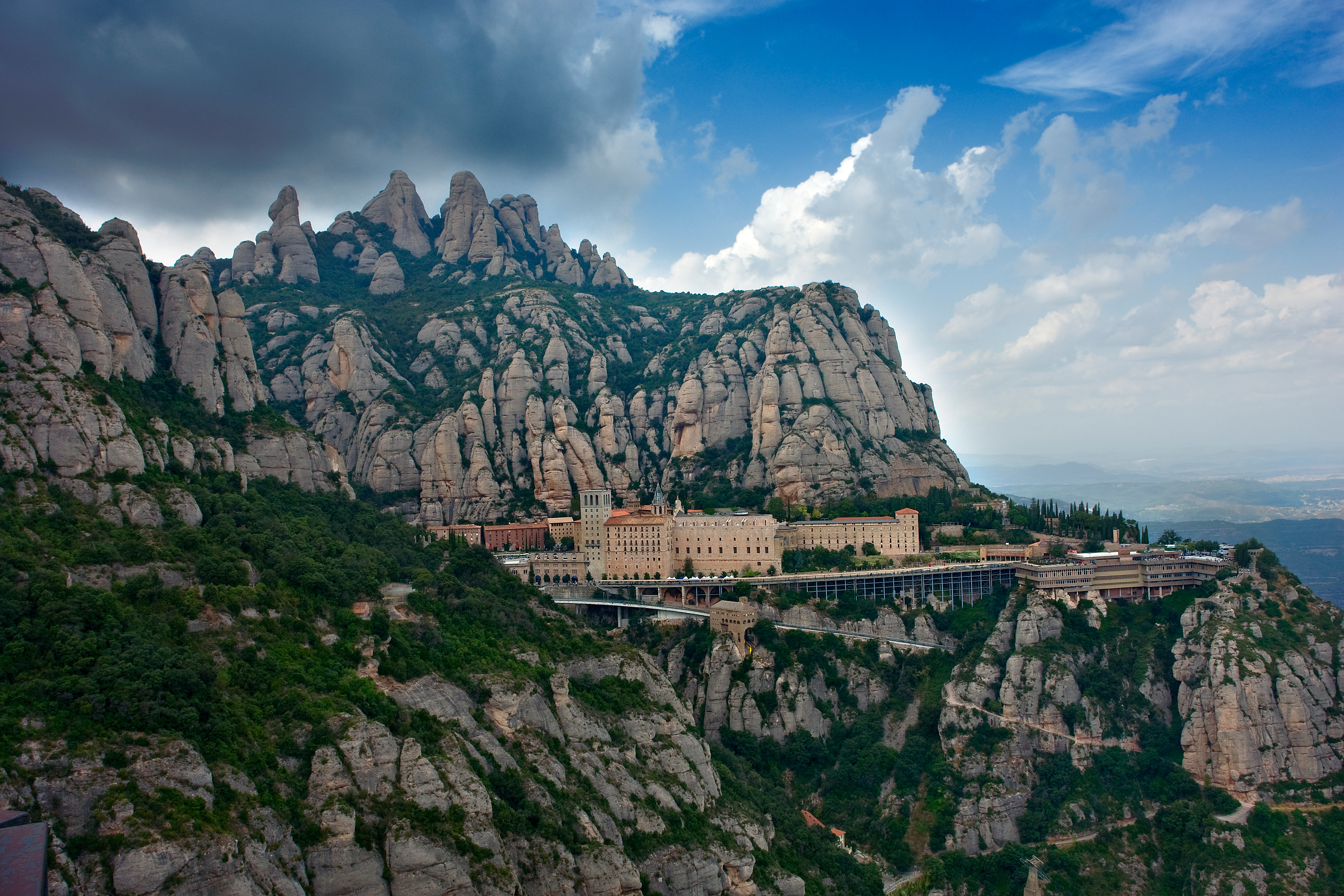
Mountain of Montserrat and the monastery

The Catalan Pyrenees represent almost half the length of the Pyrenees, as they extend more than 200 kilometres (120 miles). They are traditionally differentiated into two parts, the Axial Pyrenees (the main part) and the Pre-Pyrenees (southern from the Axial) which are mountainous formations parallel to the main mountain ranges but with lower altitudes, less steep and a different geological formation. The highest mountain of Catalonia, located north of the comarca of Pallars Sobirà, is the Pica d'Estats (3,143 m), followed by the Puigpedrós (2,914 m). The Serra del Cadí comprises the highest peaks in the Pre-Pyrenees and forms the southern boundary of the Cerdanya valley.

The Central Catalan Depression is a plain located between the Pyrenees and Pre-Coastal Mountains. Elevation ranges from 200 to 600 metres (660 to 1,970 feet). The plains and the water that descend from the Pyrenees have made it fertile territory for agriculture and numerous irrigation canals have been built. Another major plain is the Empordà, located in the northeast.

The Catalan Mediterranean system is based on two ranges running roughly parallel to the coast (southwest–northeast), called the Coastal and the Pre-Coastal Ranges. The Coastal Range is both the shorter and the lower of the two, while the Pre-Coastal is greater in both length and elevation. Areas within the Pre-Coastal Range include Montserrat, Montseny and the Ports de Tortosa-Beseit. Lowlands alternate with the Coastal and Pre-Coastal Ranges. The Coastal Lowland is located to the East of the Coastal Range between it and the coast, while the Pre-Coastal Lowlands are located inland, between the Coastal and Pre-Coastal Ranges, and includes the Vallès and Penedès plains.

=== Flora and fauna ===
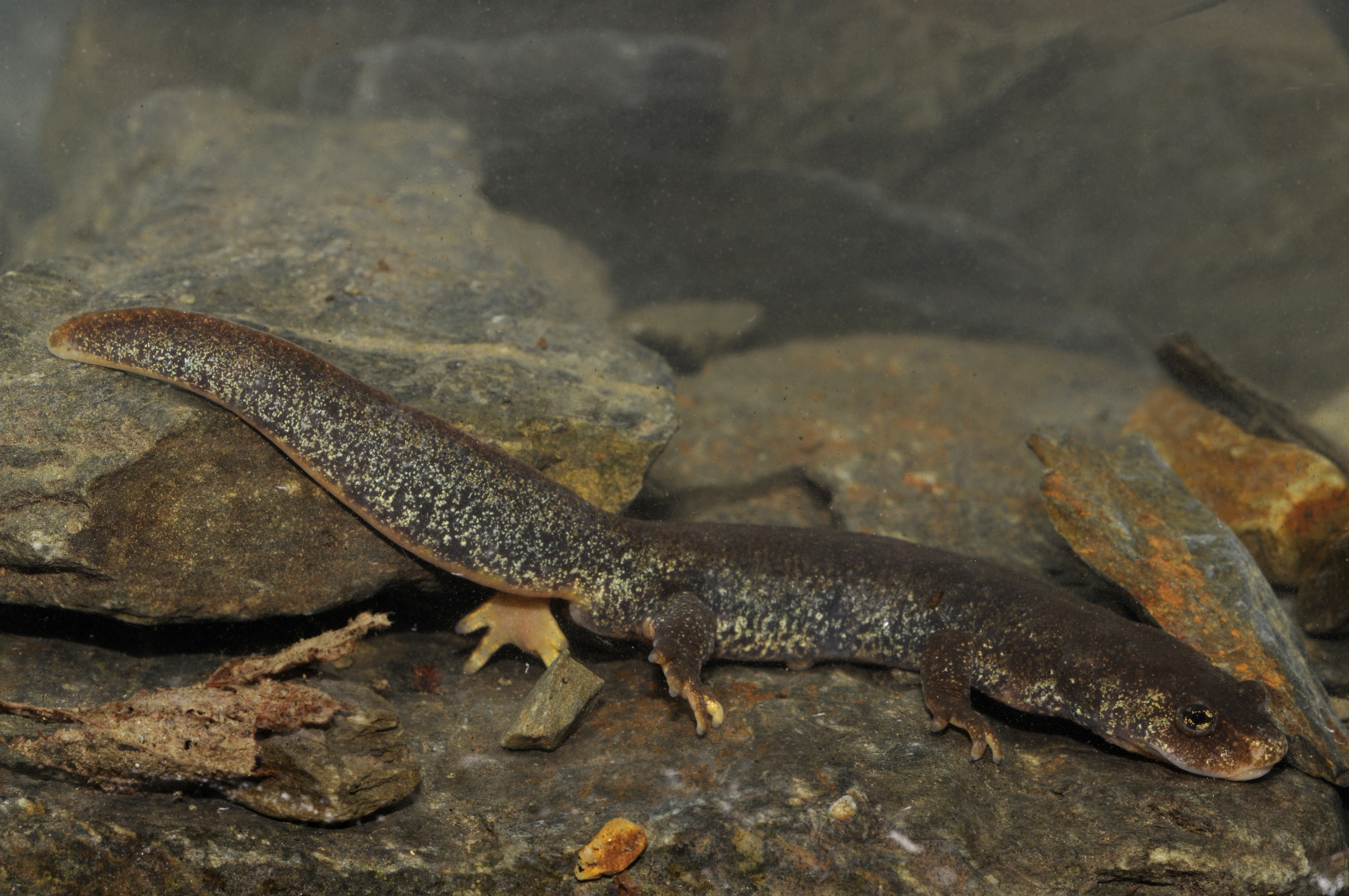
Montseny brook newt (Calotriton arnoldi), endemic to the Montseny Massif

Within its approximate 30,000 square kilometres (12,000 square miles) of terrain, Catalonia hosts a variety of substrates, soils, climates, directions, altitudes and distances to the sea. The area contains high ecological diversity and a number of diverse landscapes, habitats and species.

The fauna of Catalonia comprises a minority of animals endemic to the region and a majority of non-endemic animals. Much of Catalonia enjoys a Mediterranean climate (except mountain areas), which makes many of the animals that live there adapted to Mediterranean ecosystems. Of mammals, there are plentiful wild boar, red foxes, as well as roe deer and in the Pyrenees, the Pyrenean chamois. Other large species such as the bear have been recently reintroduced.

The waters of the Balearic Sea are rich in biodiversity, and even the megafaunas of the oceans; various types of whales (such as fin, sperm, and pilot) and dolphins can be found in the area.

=== Hydrography ===
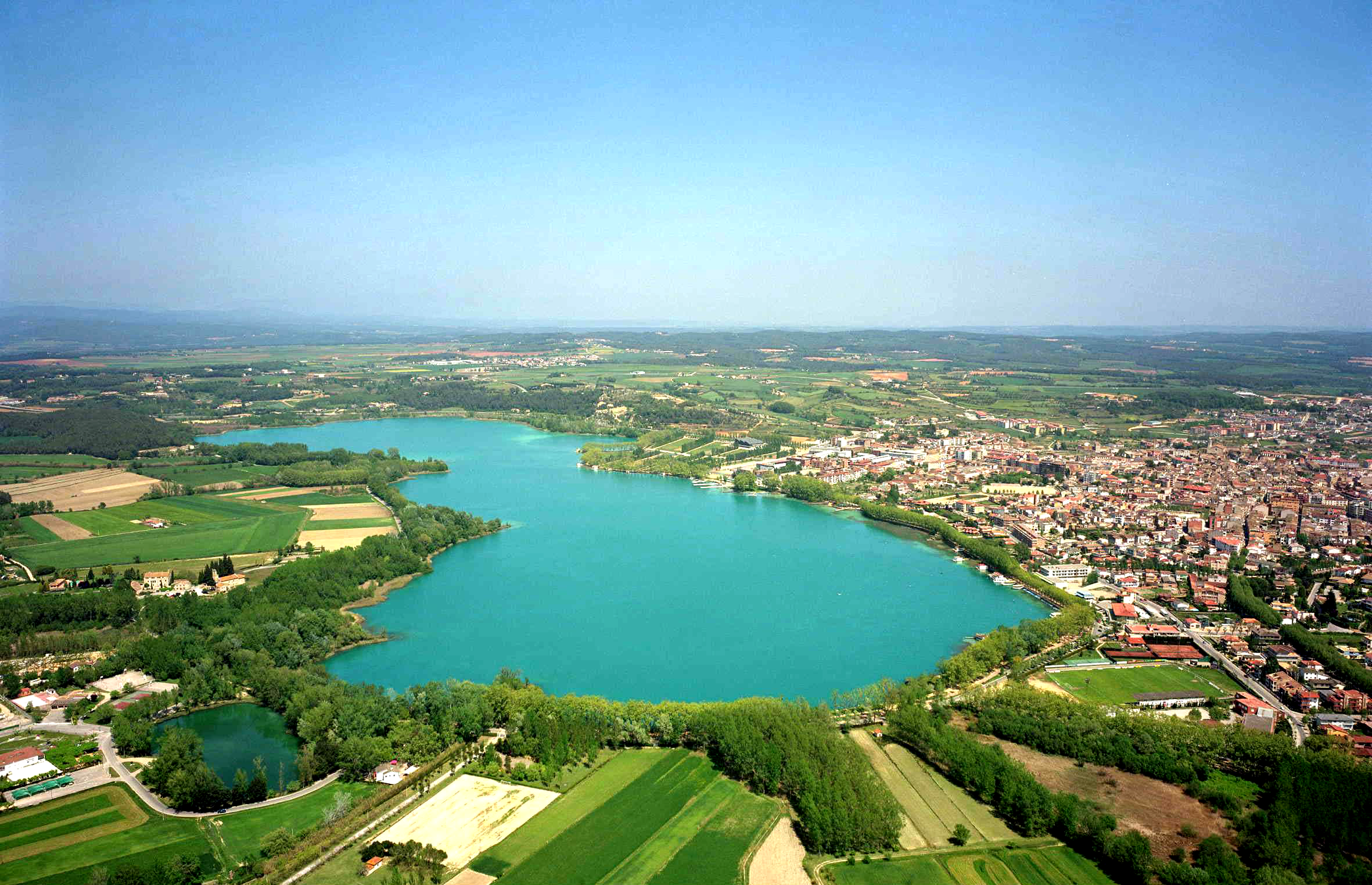
Lake of Banyoles

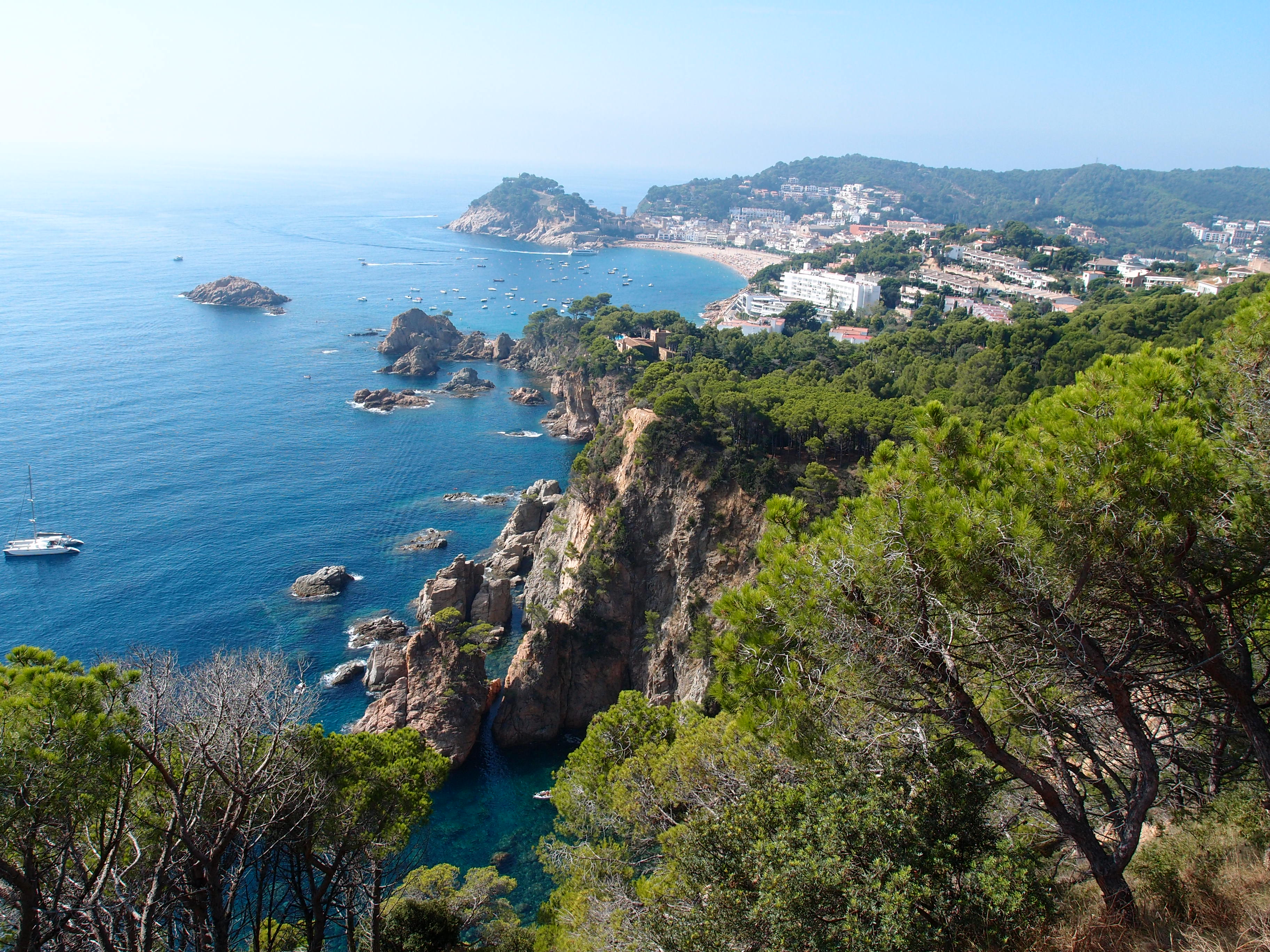
Tossa de Mar, Costa Brava

Most of Catalonia belongs to the Mediterranean Basin. The Catalan hydrographic network consists of two important basins, that of the Ebro and the one that comprises the internal basins of Catalonia (respectively covering 46.84% and 51.43% of the territory), all of them flow to the Mediterranean. Furthermore, there is the Garona river basin that flows to the Atlantic Ocean, but it only covers 1.73% of the Catalan territory.

The hydrographic network can be divided in two sectors, an occidental slope or Ebro river slope and one oriental slope constituted by minor rivers that flow to the Mediterranean along the Catalan coast. The first slope provides an average of 18,700 cubic hectometres (4.5 cubic miles) per year, while the second only provides an average of 2,020 hm^{3} (0.48 cu mi)/year. The difference is due to the big contribution of the Ebro river, from which the Segre is an important tributary. Moreover, in Catalonia there is a relative wealth of groundwaters, although there is inequality between comarques, given the complex geological structure of the territory. In the Pyrenees there are many small lakes, remnants of the ice age. The biggest are the lake of Banyoles and the recently recovered lake of Ivars.

The Catalan coast is almost rectilinear, with a length of 580 kilometres (360 mi) and few landforms—the most relevant are the Cap de Creus and the Gulf of Roses to the north and the Ebro Delta to the south. The Catalan Coastal Range hugs the coastline, and it is split into two segments, one between L'Estartit and the town of Blanes (the Costa Brava), and the other at the south, at the Costes del Garraf.

The principal rivers in Catalonia are the Ter, Llobregat, and the Ebro (Catalan: Ebre), all of which run into the Mediterranean.

=== Anthropic pressure and protection of nature ===
The majority of Catalan population is concentrated in 30% of the territory, mainly in the coastal plains. Intensive agriculture, livestock farming and industrial activities have been accompanied by a massive tourist influx (more than 20 million annual visitors), a rate of urbanisation and even of major metropolisation which has led to a strong urban sprawl: two thirds of Catalans live in the urban area of Barcelona, while the proportion of urban land increased from 4.2% in 1993 to 6.2% in 2009, a growth of 48.6% in sixteen years, complemented with a dense network of transport infrastructure. This is accompanied by a certain agricultural abandonment (decrease of 15% of all areas cultivated in Catalonia between 1993 and 2009) and a global threat to the natural environment. Human activities have also put some animal species at risk, or even led to their disappearance from the territory, like the gray wolf and probably the brown bear of the Pyrenees. The pressure created by this model of life means that the country's ecological footprint exceeds its administrative area.

Faced with these problems, Catalan authorities initiated several measures whose purpose is to protect natural ecosystems. Thus, in 1990, the Catalan government created the Nature Conservation Council (Catalan: Consell de Protecció de la Natura), an advisory body with the aim to study, protect and manage the natural environments and landscapes of Catalonia. In addition, the Generalitat has carried out the Plan of Spaces of Natural Interest (Pla d'Espais d'Interès Natural or PEIN) in 1992 while eighteen Natural Spaces of Special Protection (Espais Naturals de Protecció Especial or ENPE) have been instituted.

There is a National Park, Aigüestortes i Estany de Sant Maurici; fourteen Natural Parks, Alt Pirineu, Aiguamolls de l'Empordà, Cadí-Moixeró, Cap de Creus, Sources of Ter and Freser, Collserola, Ebro Delta, Ports, Montgrí, Medes Islands and Lower Ter, Montseny, Montserrat, Sant Llorenç del Munt and l'Obac, Serra de Montsant, and the Garrotxa Volcanic Zone; as well as three Natural Places of National Interest (Paratge Natural d'Interes Nacional or PNIN), the Pedraforca, the Poblet Forest and the Albères.

=== Climate ===
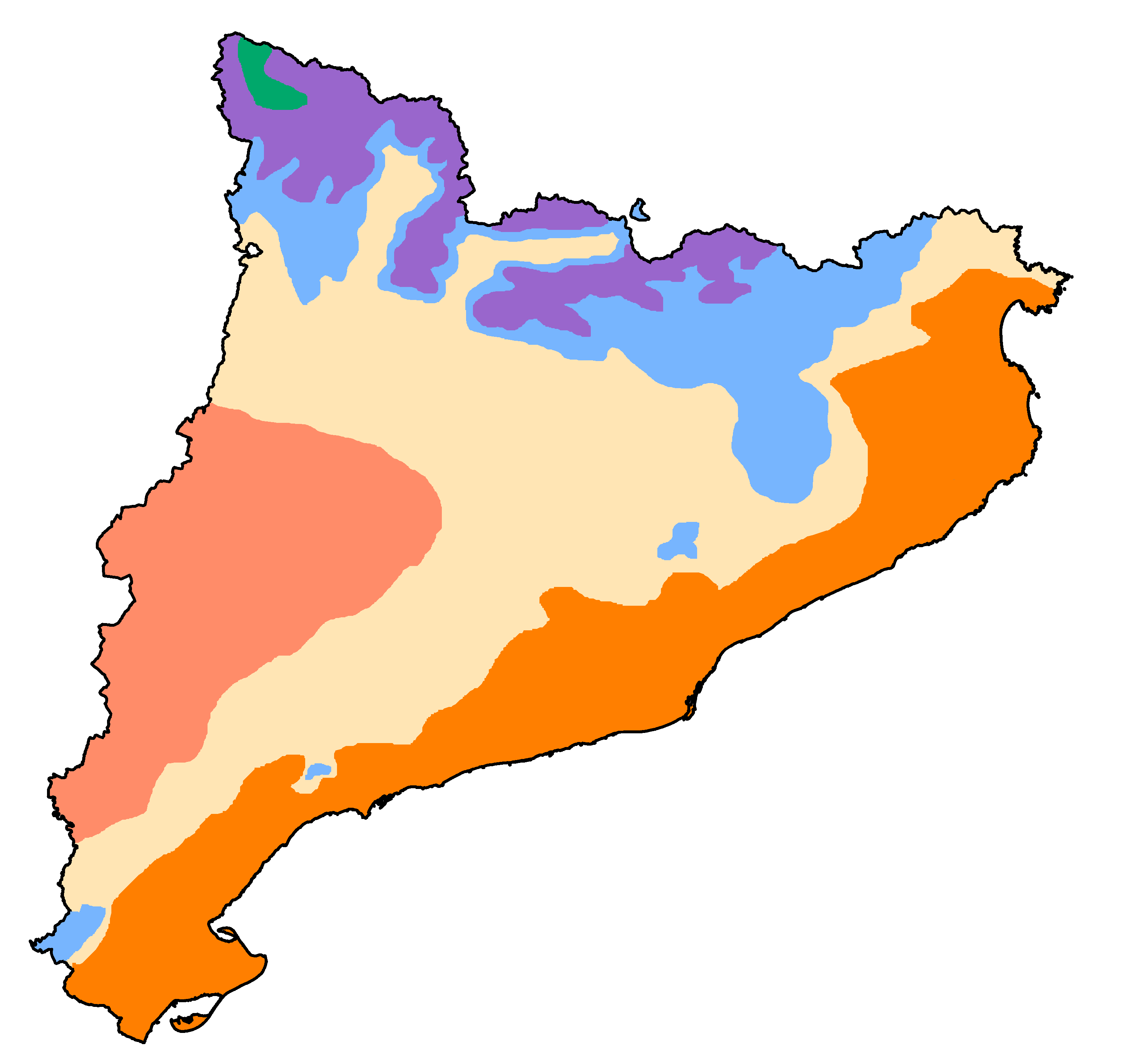
Climates of Catalonia: Oceanic climate; Alpine climate; Mediterranean climate of alpine influence; Inland Mediterranean climate; Coastal Mediterranean climate; Mediterranean climate of continental influence

The climate of Catalonia is diverse. The populated areas lying by the coast in Tarragona, Barcelona and Girona provinces feature a Hot-summer Mediterranean climate (Köppen Csa). The inland part (including the Lleida province and the inner part of Barcelona province) show a mostly Mediterranean climate (Köppen Csa). The Pyrenean peaks have a continental (Köppen D) or even Alpine climate (Köppen ET) at the highest summits, while the valleys have a maritime or oceanic climate sub-type (Köppen Cfb). A cold semi-arid climate (Köppen BSk) is also present in parts of the provinces of Tarragona and Lleida.

In the Mediterranean area, summers are dry and hot with sea breezes, and the maximum temperature is around 26–31 °C (79–88 °F). Winter is cool or slightly cold depending on the location. It snows frequently in the Pyrenees, and it occasionally snows at lower altitudes, even by the coastline. Spring and autumn are typically the rainiest seasons, except for the Pyrenean valleys, where summer is typically stormy.

The inland part of Catalonia is hotter and drier in summer. Temperature may reach 35 °C (95 °F), some days even 40 °C (104 °F). Nights are cooler there than at the coast, with the temperature of around 14–17 °C (57–63 °F). Fog is not uncommon in valleys and plains; it can be especially persistent, with freezing drizzle episodes and subzero temperatures during winter, mainly along the Ebro and Segre valleys and in the Plain of Vic. On February 2, 1956, −32 °C (−26 °F) was recorded at Lake Gento in the province of Lleida, which is the lowest temperature ever recorded in Spain.

Climate data for Catalonia (1991–2020), extremes (1924–present)
Month	Jan	Feb	Mar	Apr	May	Jun	Jul	Aug	Sep	Oct	Nov	Dec	Year
Record high °C (°F)	28.1 (82.6)	27.2 (81.0)	32.5 (90.5)	34.0 (93.2)	39.6 (103.3)	43.9 (111.0)	45.4 (113.7)	43.9 (111.0)	41.4 (106.5)	36.0 (96.8)	30.0 (86.0)	27.0 (80.6)	45.4 (113.7)
Mean daily maximum °C (°F)	10.1 (50.2)	12.0 (53.6)	15.3 (59.5)	17.6 (63.7)	21.7 (71.1)	26.3 (79.3)	29.4 (84.9)	29.2 (84.6)	24.6 (76.3)	19.8 (67.6)	13.9 (57.0)	10.4 (50.7)	19.2 (66.5)
Daily mean °C (°F)	5.3 (41.5)	6.4 (43.5)	9.3 (48.7)	11.6 (52.9)	15.4 (59.7)	19.7 (67.5)	22.6 (72.7)	22.6 (72.7)	18.5 (65.3)	14.4 (57.9)	9.0 (48.2)	5.8 (42.4)	13.4 (56.1)
Mean daily minimum °C (°F)	0.5 (32.9)	0.8 (33.4)	3.3 (37.9)	5.6 (42.1)	9.2 (48.6)	13.2 (55.8)	15.8 (60.4)	16.0 (60.8)	12.4 (54.3)	8.9 (48.0)	4.1 (39.4)	1.3 (34.3)	7.6 (45.7)
Record low °C (°F)	−26.0 (−14.8)	−32.0 (−25.6)	−20.0 (−4.0)	−15.8 (3.6)	−10.5 (13.1)	−4.4 (24.1)	−2.3 (27.9)	−5.5 (22.1)	−7.8 (18.0)	−11.0 (12.2)	−16.0 (3.2)	−20.0 (−4.0)	−32.0 (−25.6)
Average precipitation mm (inches)	45.4 (1.79)	31.0 (1.22)	48.1 (1.89)	65.2 (2.57)	67.7 (2.67)	49.7 (1.96)	34.5 (1.36)	47.5 (1.87)	68.3 (2.69)	77.9 (3.07)	63.2 (2.49)	45.6 (1.80)	644.1 (25.38)
Source: Agencia Estatal de Meteorologia

== Politics ==
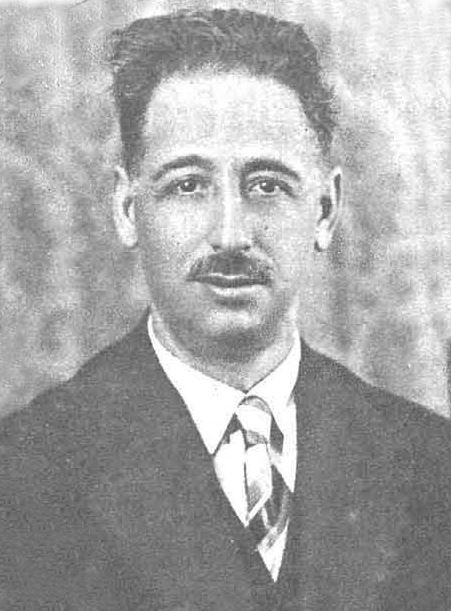
Lluís Companys, second president of the Generalitat of Catalonia between 1933 and 1940, executed by Franco's regime

After Franco's death in 1975 and the adoption of a democratic constitution in Spain in 1978, Catalonia recovered and extended the powers that it had gained in the Statute of Autonomy of 1932 but lost with the fall of the Second Spanish Republic at the end of the Spanish Civil War in 1939.

This autonomous community has gradually achieved more autonomy since the approval of the Spanish Constitution of 1978. The Generalitat holds exclusive jurisdiction in education, health, culture, environment, communications, transportation, commerce, public safety and local government, and only shares jurisdiction with the Spanish government in justice. In all, some analysts argue that formally the current system grants Catalonia with "more self-government than almost any other corner in Europe".

The support for Catalan nationalism ranges from a demand for further autonomy and the federalisation of Spain to the desire for independence from the rest of Spain, expressed by Catalan independentists. The first survey following the Constitutional Court ruling that cut back elements of the 2006 Statute of Autonomy, published by La Vanguardia on 18 July 2010, found that 46% of the voters would support independence in a referendum. In February of the same year, a poll by the Open University of Catalonia gave more or less the same results. Other polls have shown lower support for independence, ranging from 40 to 49%. Although it is established in the whole of the territory, support for independence is significantly higher in the hinterland and the northeast, away from the more populous coastal areas such as Barcelona.

Since 2011 when the question started to be regularly surveyed by the governmental Center for Public Opinion Studies (CEO), support for Catalan independence has been on the rise. According to the CEO opinion poll from July 2016, 47.7% of Catalans would vote for independence and 42.4% against it while, about the question of preferences, according to the CEO opinion poll from March 2016, a 57.2 claim to be "absolutely" or "fairly" in favour of independence. Other polls have shown lower support for independence, ranging from 40 to 49%. Other polls show more variable results, according with the Spanish CIS, as of December 2016, 47% of Catalans rejected independence and 45% supported it.

In hundreds of non-binding local referendums on independence, organised across Catalonia from 13 September 2009, a large majority voted for independence, although critics argued that the polls were mostly held in pro-independence areas. In December 2009, 94% of those voting backed independence from Spain, on a turn-out of 25%. The final local referendum was held in Barcelona, in April 2011. On 11 September 2012, a pro-independence march pulled in a crowd of between 600,000 (according to the Spanish Government), 1.5 million (according to the Guàrdia Urbana de Barcelona), and 2 million (according to its promoters); whereas poll results revealed that half the population of Catalonia supported secession from Spain.

Prominent Catalan politicians in Spain.

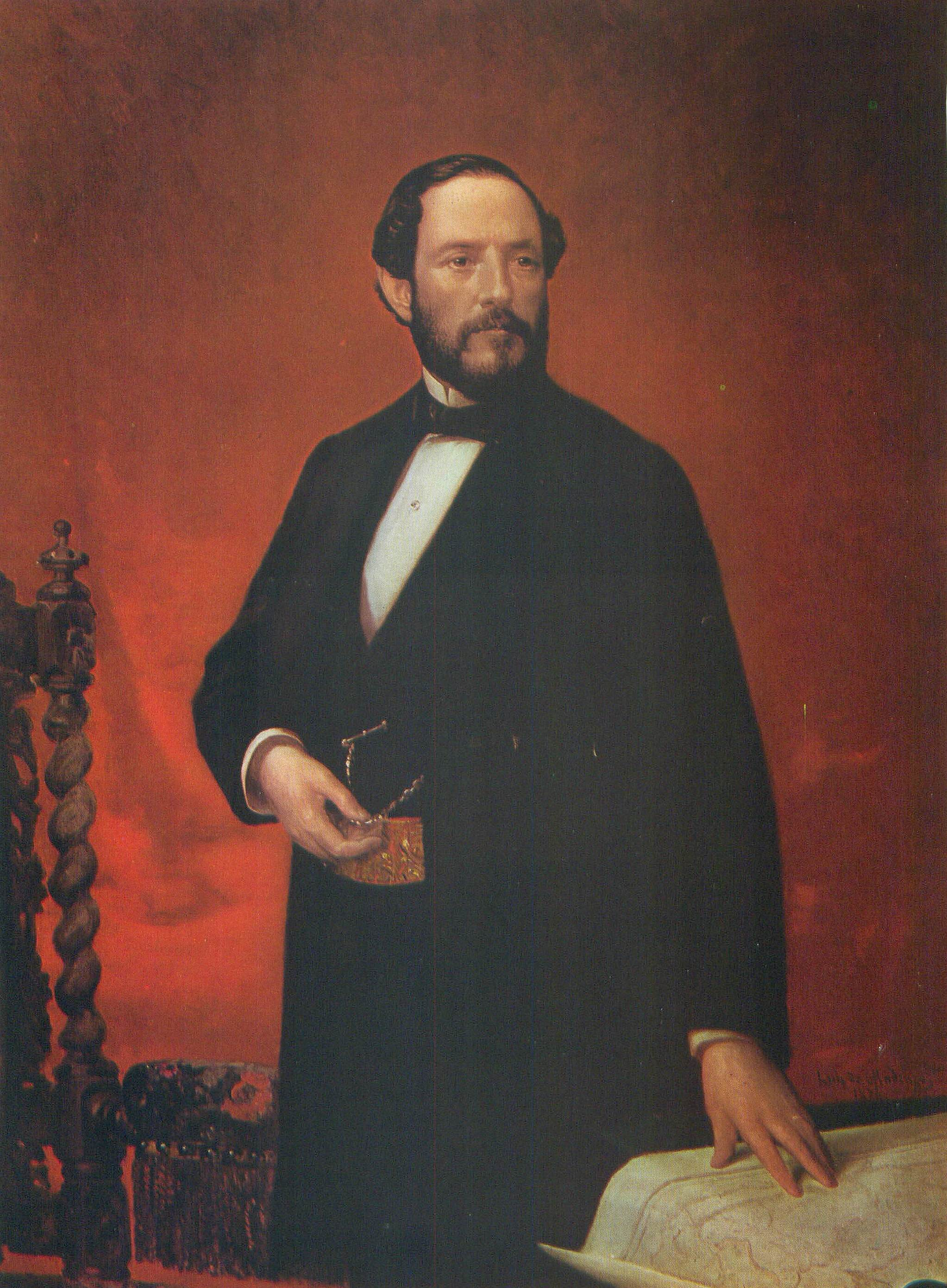
Juan Prim (Spanish prime minister under regent don Francisco Serrano)

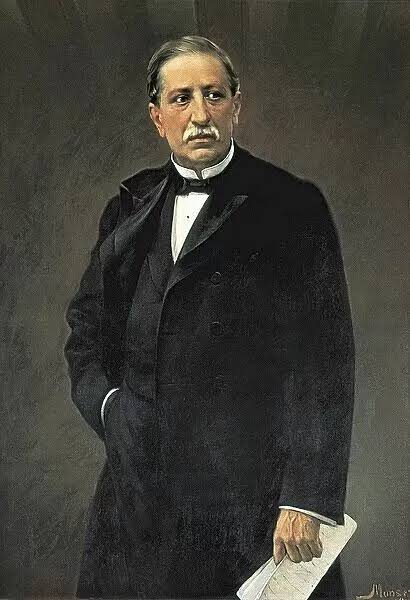
Estanislao Figueras (president of the First Spanish Republic)

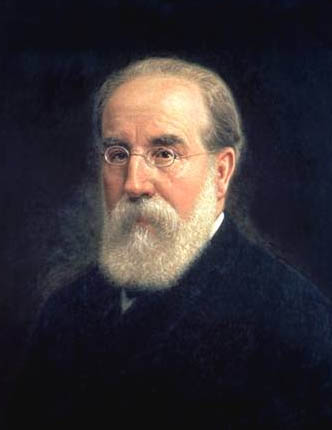
Francesc Pi i Margall
(president of the First Spanish Republic)

Two major factors were Spain's Constitutional Court's 2010 decision to declare part of the 2006 Statute of Autonomy of Catalonia unconstitutional, as well as the fact that Catalonia contributes 19.49% of the central government's tax revenue, but only receives 14.03% of central government's spending.

Parties that consider themselves either Catalan nationalist or independentist have been present in all Catalan governments since 1980. The largest Catalan nationalist party, Convergence and Union, ruled Catalonia from 1980 to 2003, and returned to power in the 2010 election. Between 2003 and 2010, a leftist coalition, composed by the Catalan Socialists' Party, the pro-independence Republican Left of Catalonia and the leftist-environmentalist Initiative for Catalonia-Greens, implemented policies that widened Catalan autonomy.

In the 25 November 2012 Catalan parliamentary election, sovereigntist parties supporting a secession referendum gathered 59.01% of the votes and held 87 of the 135 seats in the Catalan Parliament. Parties supporting independence from the rest of Spain obtained 49.12% of the votes and a majority of 74 seats.

Artur Mas, then the president of Catalonia, organised early elections that took place on 27 September 2015. In these elections, Convergència and Esquerra Republicana decided to join, and they presented themselves under the coalition named Junts pel Sí (in Catalan, Together for Yes). Junts pel Sí won 62 seats and was the most voted party, and CUP (Candidatura d'Unitat Popular, a far-left and independentist party) won another 10, so the sum of all the independentist forces/parties was 72 seats, reaching an absolute majority, but not in number of individual votes, comprising 47,74% of the total.

=== Statute of Autonomy ===
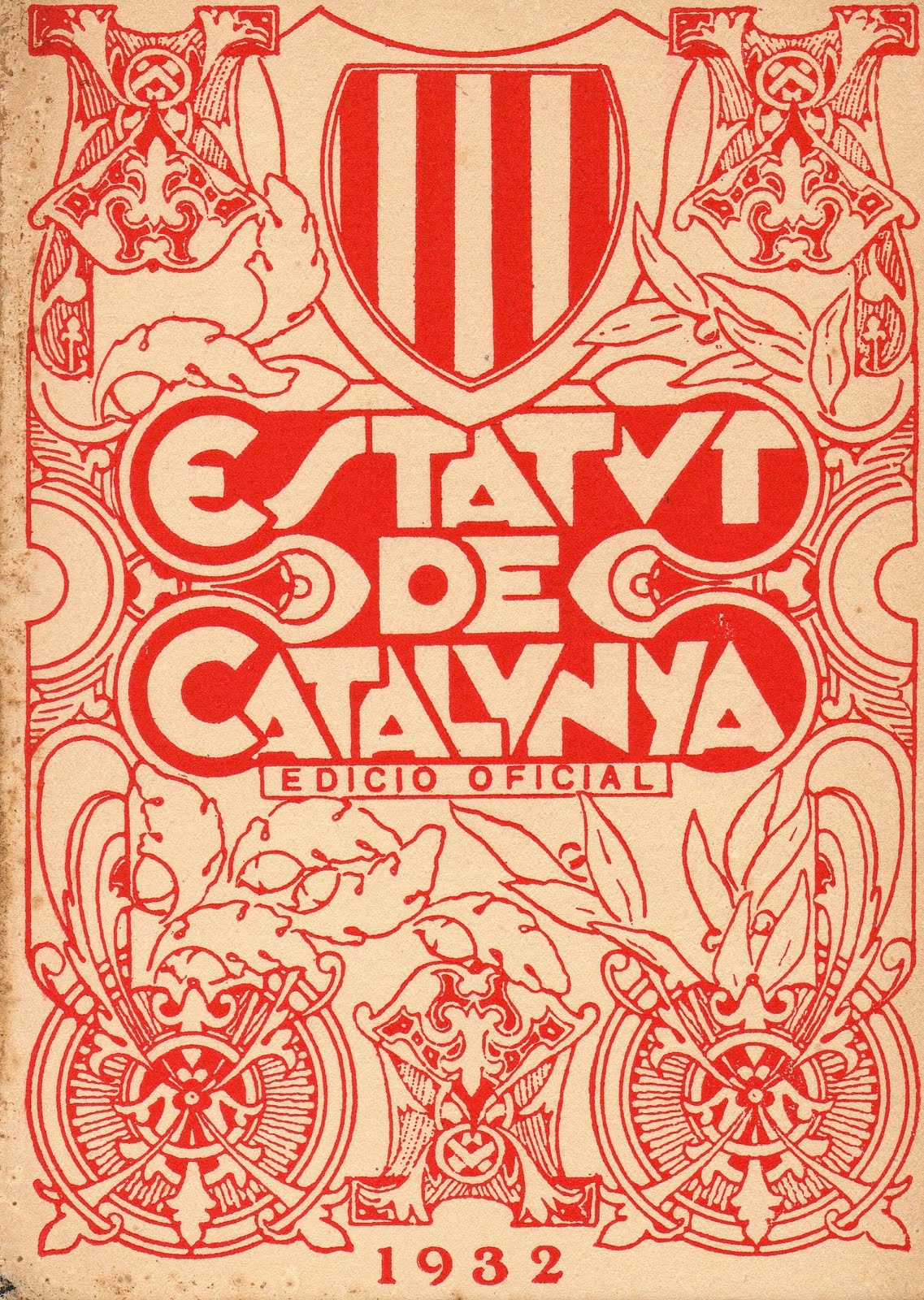
The first Statute of Catalonia, 1932

The Statute of Autonomy of Catalonia is the fundamental organic law, second only to the Spanish Constitution from which the Statute originates.

In the Spanish Constitution of 1978 Catalonia, along with the Basque Country and Galicia, was defined as a "nationality". The same constitution gave Catalonia the automatic right to autonomy, which resulted in the Statute of Autonomy of Catalonia of 1979.

Both the 1979 Statute of Autonomy and the current one, approved in 2006, state that "Catalonia, as a nationality, exercises its self-government constituted as an Autonomous Community in accordance with the Constitution and with the Statute of Autonomy of Catalonia, which is its basic institutional law, always under the law in Spain".

The Preamble of the 2006 Statute of Autonomy of Catalonia states that the Parliament of Catalonia has defined Catalonia as a nation, but that "the Spanish Constitution recognises Catalonia's national reality as a nationality". While the Statute was approved by and sanctioned by both the Catalan and Spanish parliaments, and later by referendum in Catalonia, it has been subject to a legal challenge by the surrounding autonomous communities of Aragon, Balearic Islands and Valencia, as well as by the conservative People's Party. The objections are based on various issues such as disputed cultural heritage but, especially, on the Statute's alleged breaches of the principle of "solidarity between regions" in fiscal and educational matters enshrined by the Constitution.

Spain's Constitutional Court assessed the disputed articles and on 28 June 2010, issued its judgment on the principal allegation of unconstitutionality presented by the People's Party in 2006. The judgment granted clear passage to 182 articles of the 223 that make up the fundamental text. The court approved 73 of the 114 articles that the People's Party had contested, while declaring 14 articles unconstitutional in whole or in part and imposing a restrictive interpretation on 27 others. The court accepted the specific provision that described Catalonia as a "nation", however ruled that it was a historical and cultural term with no legal weight, and that Spain remained the only nation recognised by the constitution.

=== Government and law ===
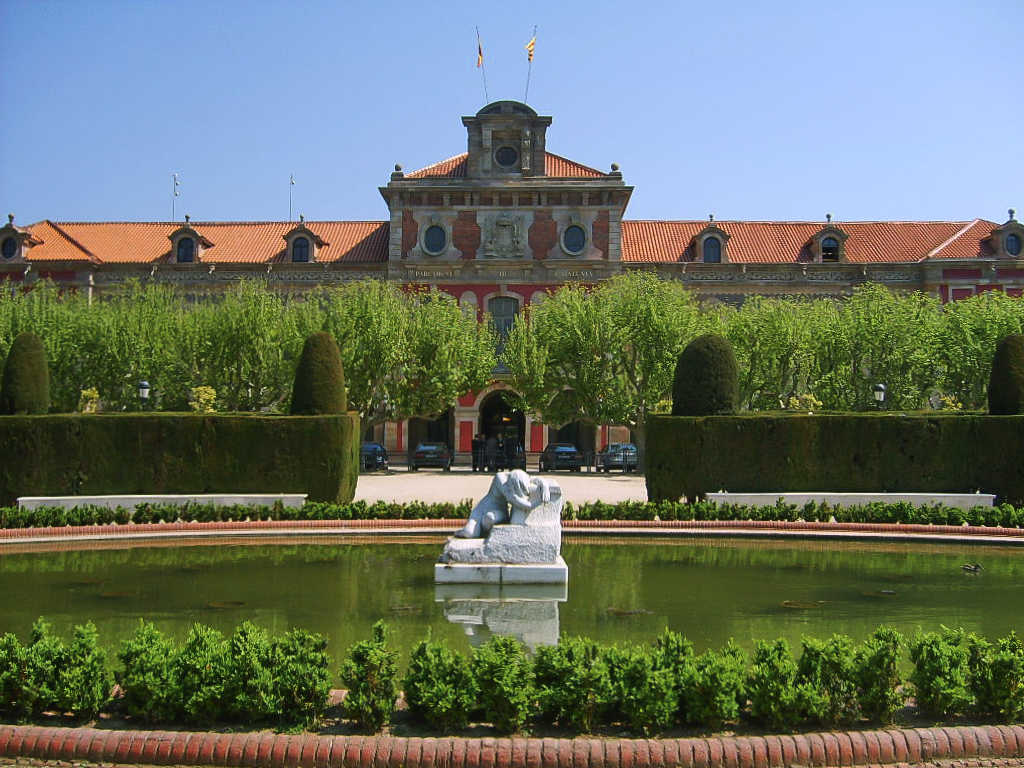
Palace of the Parliament of Catalonia, located in Ciutadella park, Barcelona

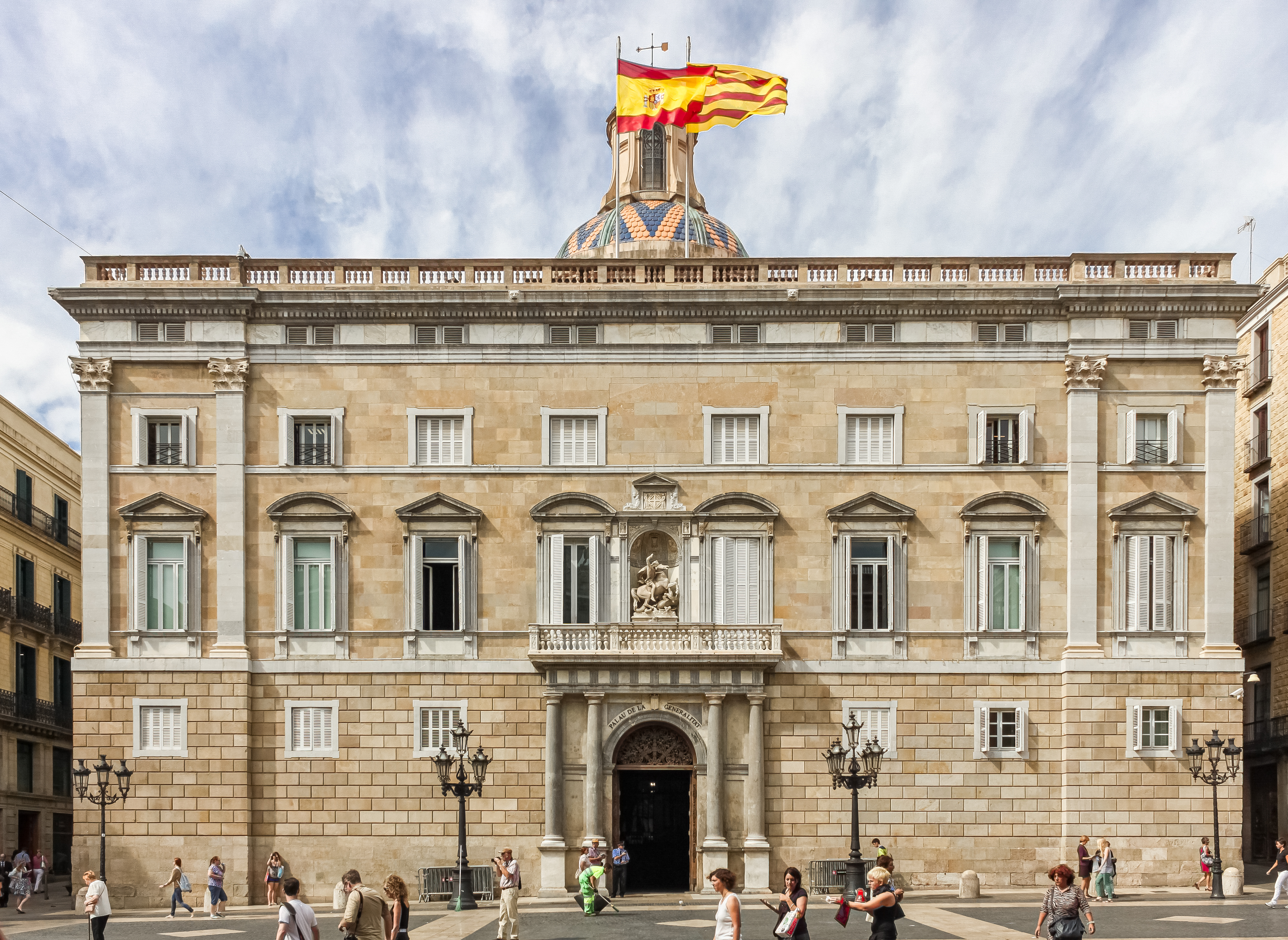
Palau de la Generalitat de Catalunya, Barcelona, headquarters of the President and the Government of Catalonia

The Catalan Statute of Autonomy establishes that Catalonia, as an autonomous community, is organised politically through the Generalitat of Catalonia (Catalan: Generalitat de Catalunya), confirmed by the Parliament, the Presidency of the Generalitat, the Government or Executive Council and the other institutions established by the Parliament, among them the Ombudsman (Síndic de Greuges), the Office of Auditors (Sindicatura de Comptes) the Council for Statutory Guarantees (Consell de Garanties Estatutàries) or the Audiovisual Council of Catalonia (Consell de l'Audiovisual de Catalunya).

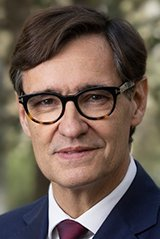
Salvador Illa, President of the Generalitat of Catalonia (2024–)

The Parliament of Catalonia (Catalan: Parlament de Catalunya) is the unicameral legislative body of the Generalitat and represents the people of Catalonia. Its 135 members (diputats) are elected by universal suffrage to serve for a four-year period. According to the Statute of Autonomy, it has powers to legislate over devolved matters such as education, health, culture, internal institutional and territorial organisation, nominate the President of the Generalitat, and control the Government, budget and other affairs. The last Catalan election was held on 12 May 2024, and the current speaker (president) of the parliament is Josep Rull, incumbent since 10 June 2024.

The President of the Generalitat of Catalonia (Catalan: president de la Generalitat de Catalunya) is the highest representative of Catalonia, and is also responsible for leading the government's action, presiding over the Executive Council. Since the restoration of the Generalitat on the return of democracy in Spain, the Presidents of Catalonia have been Josep Tarradellas (1977–1980, president in exile since 1954), Jordi Pujol (1980–2003), Pasqual Maragall (2003–2006), José Montilla (2006–2010), Artur Mas (2010–2016), Carles Puigdemont (2016–2017) and, after the imposition of direct rule from Madrid, Quim Torra (2018–2020), Pere Aragonès (2021–2024) and Salvador Illa (2024–).

The Executive Council (Catalan: Consell Executiu) or Government (Govern), is the body responsible of the government of the Generalitat. It holds executive and regulatory power, being accountable to the Catalan Parliament. The Executive Council comprises the President of the Generalitat, the First Minister (conseller primer) or the Vice President, and the ministers (consellers) appointed by the president. Its seat is the Palau de la Generalitat, Barcelona. In 2025 the government composed of solely one party, the Socialists' Party of Catalonia (PSC-PSOE) and is made up of 16 ministers, including the vice President, alongside the president and a secretary of government.

=== Security forces and Justice ===
Catalonia has its own police force, the Mossos d'Esquadra (officially called Mossos d'Esquadra-Policia de la Generalitat de Catalunya), whose origins date back to the 18th century. Since 1980 they have been under the command of the Generalitat, and since 1994 they have expanded in number in order to replace the national Civil Guard and National Police Corps, which report directly to the Homeland Department of Spain. The national bodies retain personnel within Catalonia to exercise functions of national scope such as overseeing ports, airports, coasts, international borders, custom offices, the identification of documents and arms control, immigration control, terrorism prevention, arms trafficking prevention, amongst others.

Most of the justice system is administered by national judicial institutions, the highest body and last judicial instance in the Catalan jurisdiction, integrating the Spanish judiciary, is the High Court of Justice of Catalonia. The criminal justice system is uniform throughout Spain, while civil law is administered separately within Catalonia. The civil laws that are subject to autonomous legislation have been codified in the Civil Code of Catalonia (Codi civil de Catalunya) since 2002.

Catalonia, together with Navarre and the Basque Country, are the Spanish communities with the highest degree of autonomy in terms of law enforcement.

=== Administrative divisions ===
Provinces, regions and counties of Catalonia (until 2015)

Catalonia is organised territorially into provinces or regions, further subdivided into comarques and municipalities. The 2006 Statute of Autonomy of Catalonia establishes the administrative organisation of the later three.

==== Provinces ====
Much like the rest of Spain, Catalonia is divided administratively into four provinces, the governing body of which is the Provincial Deputation (Catalan: Diputació Provincial, Occitan: Deputacion Provinciau, Spanish: Diputación Provincial). As of 2010, the four provinces and their populations were:

- Province of Barcelona: 5,701,708 population
- Province of Girona: 777,258 population
- Province of Lleida: 437,939 population
- Province of Tarragona: 830,804 population

Unlike vegueries, provinces do not follow the limitations of the subdivisional counties, notably Baixa Cerdanya, which is split in half between the demarcations of Lleida and Girona. This situation has led some isolated municipalities to request province changes from the Spanish government.

==== Vegueries ====
Besides provinces, Catalonia is internally divided into eight regions or vegueries, based on the feudal administrative territorial jurisdiction of the Principality of Catalonia. Established in 2006, vegueries are used by the Generalitat de Catalunya with the aim to more effectively divide Catalonia administratively. In addition, vegueries are intended to become Catalonia's first-level administrative division and a full replacement for the four deputations of the Catalan provinces, creating a council for each vegueria, but this has not been realised as changes to the statewide provinces system are unconstitutional without a constitutional amendment.

The territorial plan of Catalonia (Pla territorial general de Catalunya) provided six general functional areas, but was amended by Law 24/2001, of 31 December, recognizing Alt Pirineu and Aran as a new functional area differentiated of Ponent. After some opposition from some territories, it was made possible for the Aran Valley to retain its government (the vegueria is renamed to Alt Pirineu, although the name Alt Pirineu and Aran is still used by the regional plan) and in 2016, the Catalan Parliament approved the eighth vegueria, Penedès, split from the Barcelona region.

As of 2022, the eight regions and their populations were:

- Alt Pirineu (capital La Seu d'Urgell): 63,892 population
- Barcelona (capital Barcelona): 4,916,847 population
- Camp de Tarragona (capital Tarragona): 536,453 population
- Central Catalonia (capital Manresa): 413,349 population
- Girona (capital Girona): 761,690 population
- Ponent (capital Lleida): 365,289 population
- Penedès (capital Vilanova i la Geltrú): 497,764 population
- Terres de l'Ebre (capital Tortosa): 182,231 population
- Aran Valley (capital Vielha e Mijaran): 10,194 population (The autonomous Aran Valley, considered a "unique territorial entity", is not part of any vegueria.)

==== Comarques ====
Comarques (often known as counties in English, but different from the historical Catalan counties) are entities composed of municipalities to internally manage their responsibilities and services. The current regional division has its roots in a decree of the Generalitat de Catalunya of 1936, in effect until 1939, when it was suppressed by Franco. In 1987 the Catalan Government reestablished the comarcal division and in 1988 three new comarques were added (Alta Ribagorça, Pla d'Urgell and Pla de l'Estany). Some further revisions have been realised since then, such as the additions of Moianès and Lluçanès counties, in 2015 and 2023 respectively. Except for Barcelonès, every comarca is administered by a comarcal council (consell comarcal).

As of 2024, Catalonia is divided into 42 counties plus the Aran Valley. The latter, although previously (and still informally) considered a comarca, obtained in 1990 a particular status within Catalonia due to its differences in culture and language, being administered by a body known as the Conselh Generau d'Aran (General Council of Aran), and in 2015 it was defined as a "unique territorial entity" instead of a county.

==== Municipalities ====
There are at present 947 municipalities (municipis) in Catalonia. Each municipality is run by a council (ajuntament) elected every four years by the residents in local elections. The council consists of a number of members (regidors) depending on population, who elect the mayor (alcalde or batlle). Its seat is the town hall (ajuntament, casa de la ciutat or casa de la vila).

Catalan regional capitals

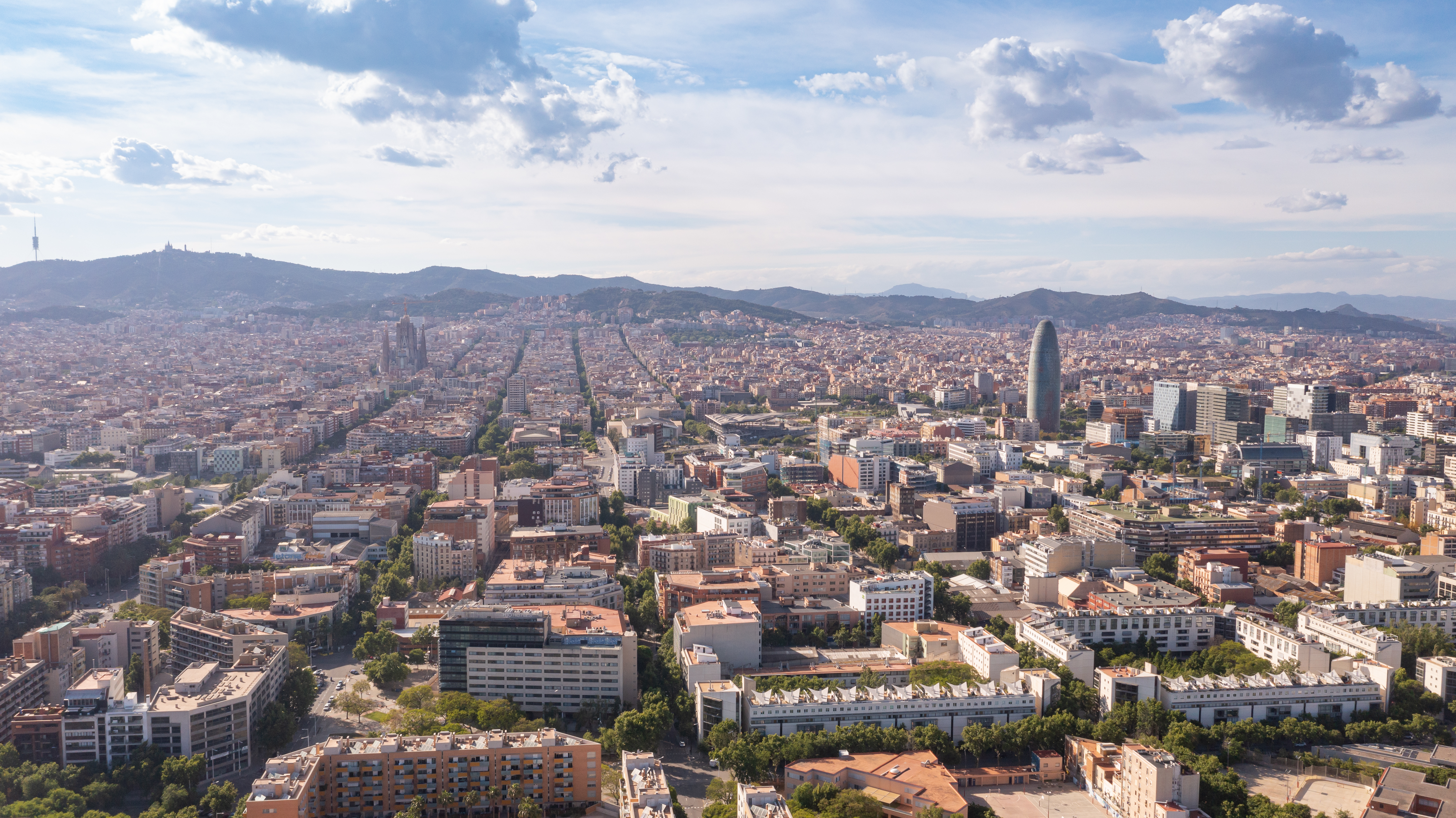
An aerial view of Barcelona

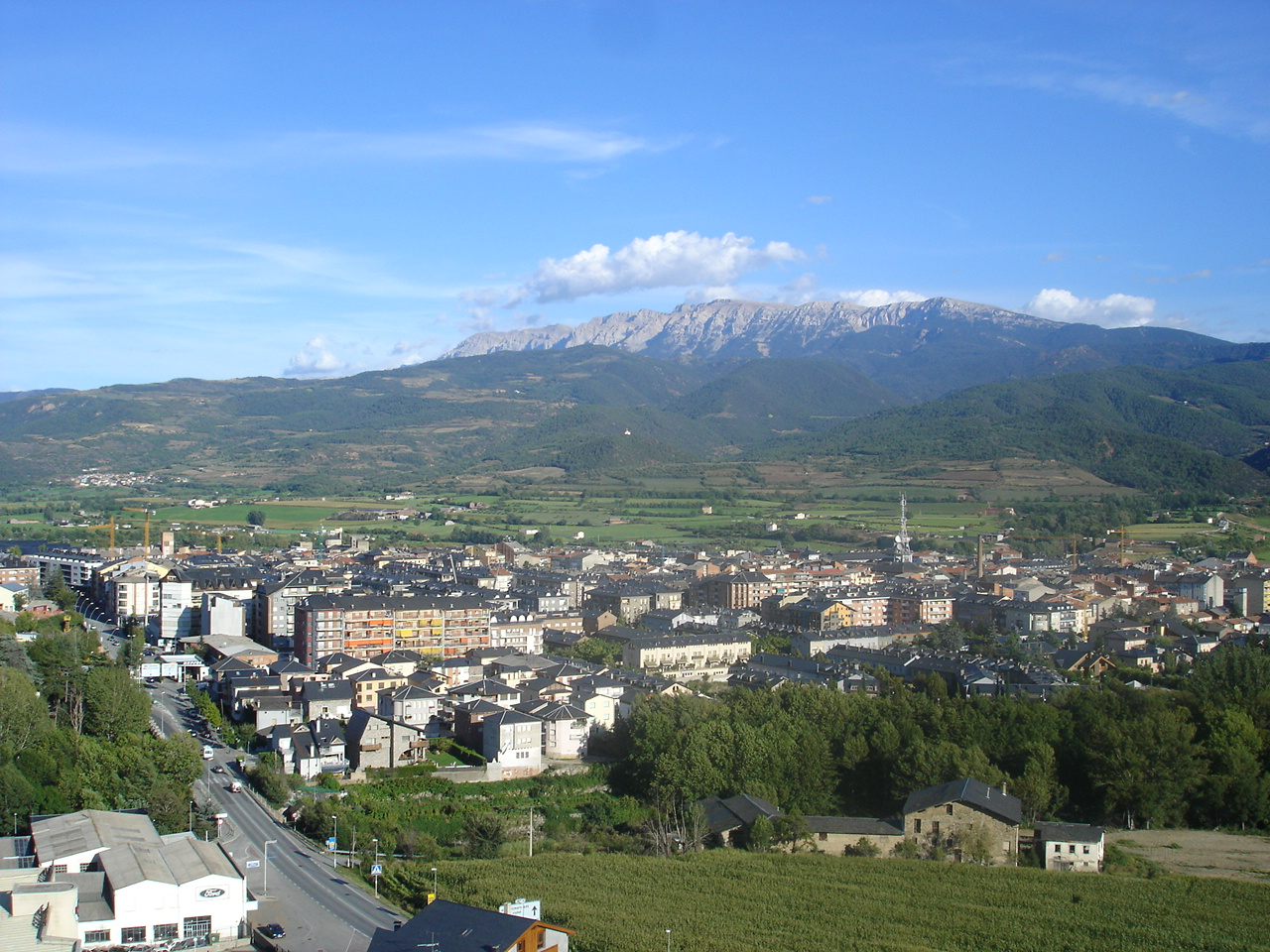
La Seu d'Urgell from the Solsona tower

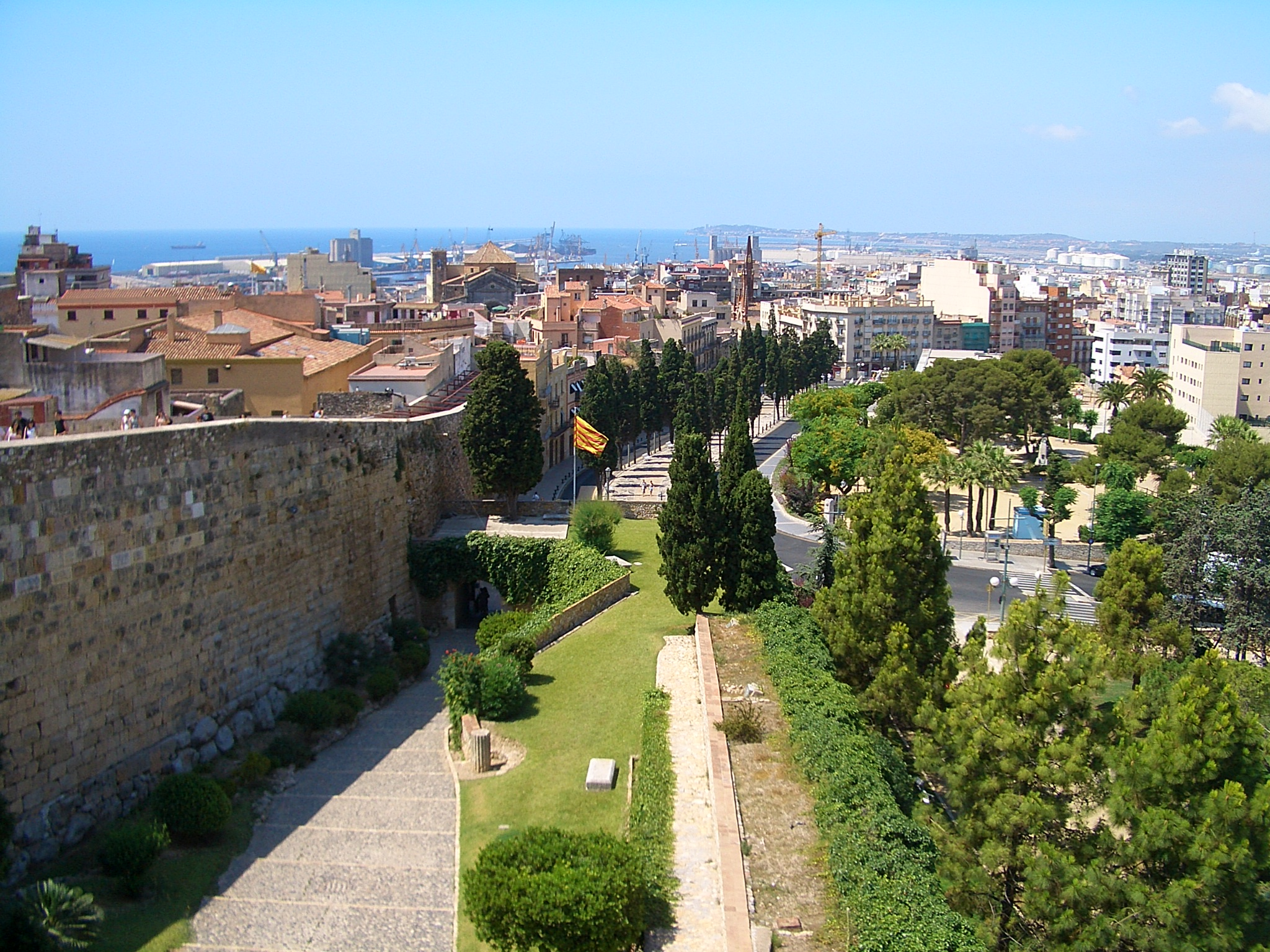
The city of Tarragona

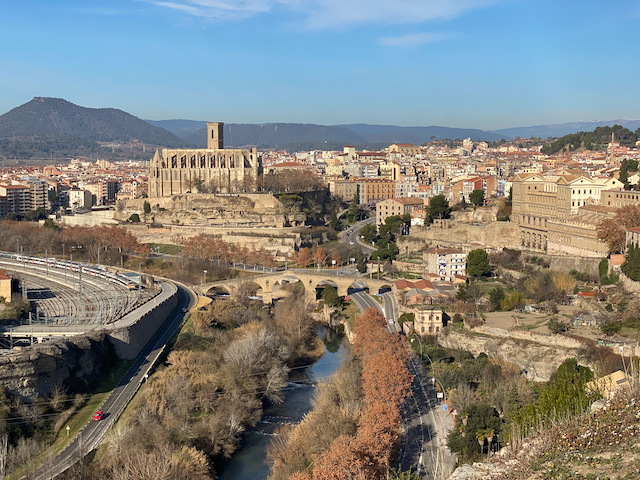
The city of Manresa from the Balconada viewpoint

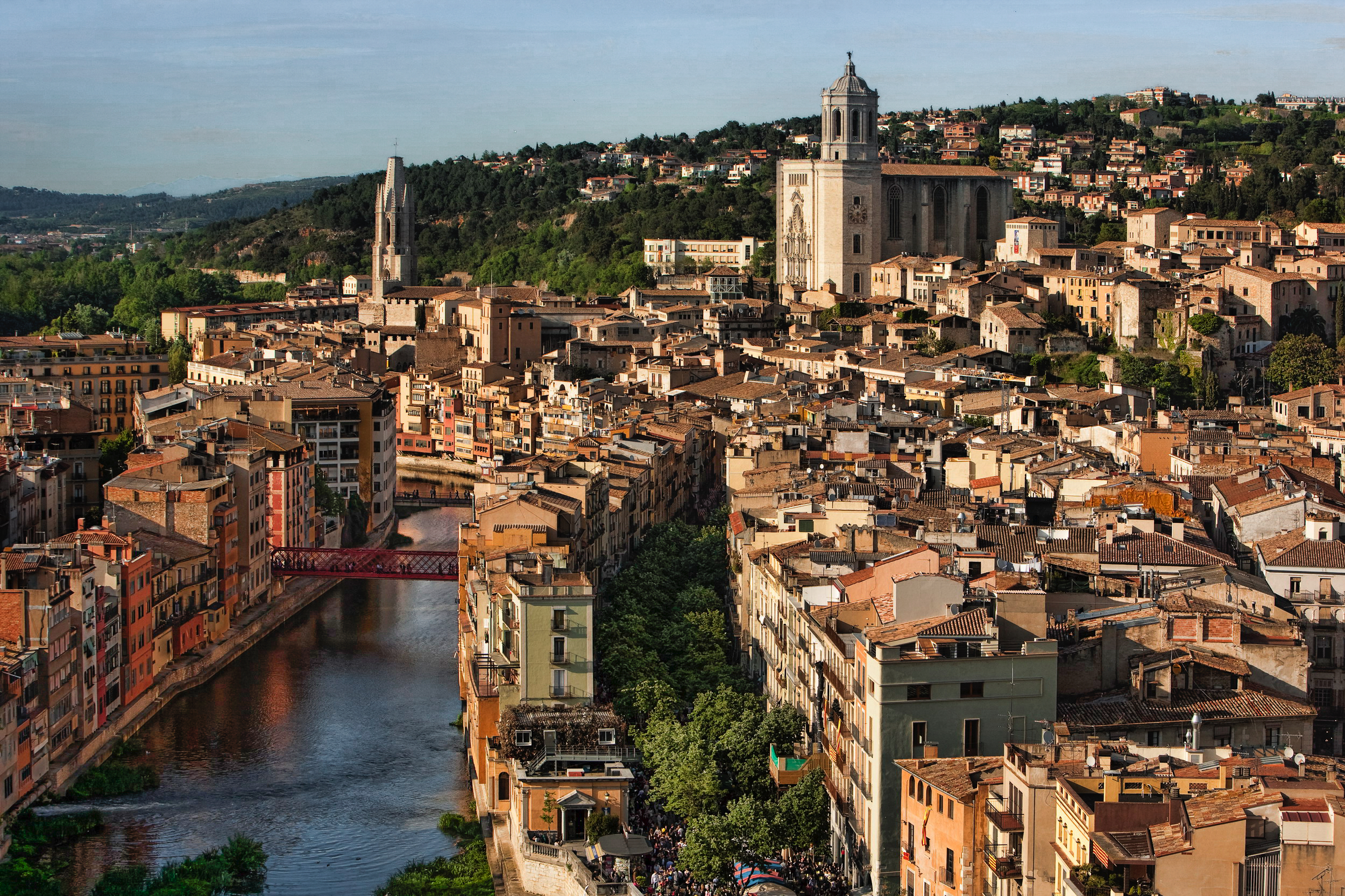
The city of Girona

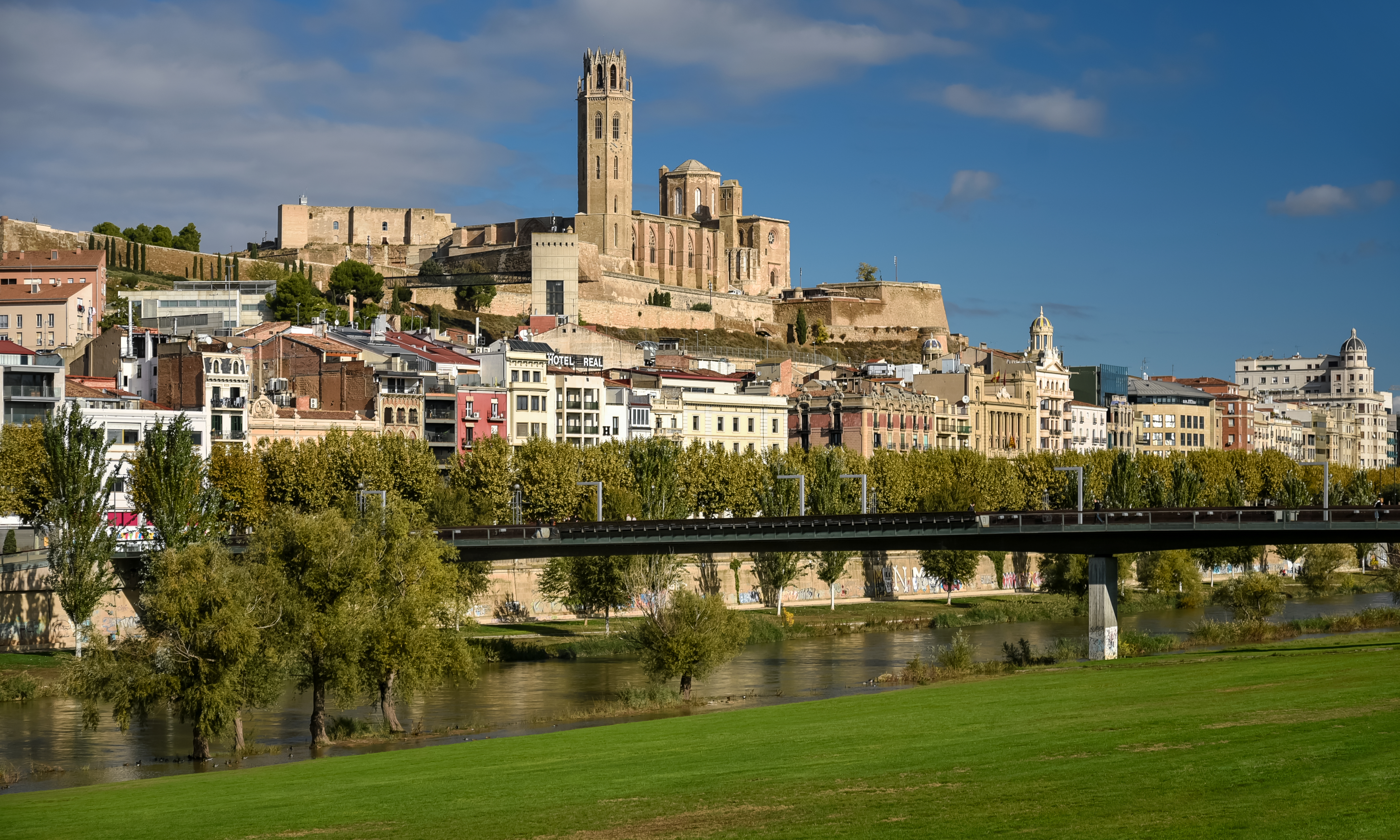
The city of Lleida by the Segre river

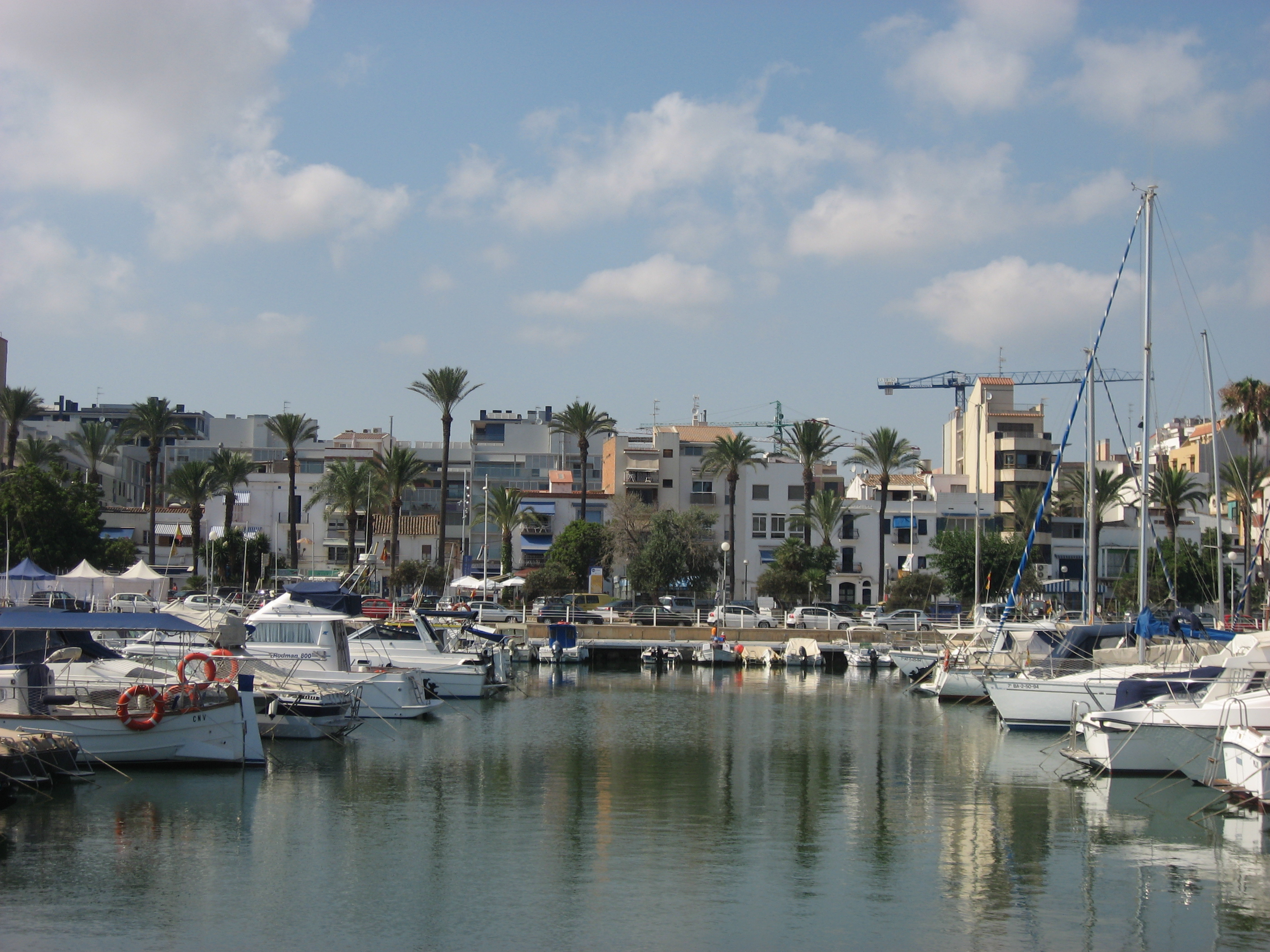
Vilanova i la Geltrú from the city's port

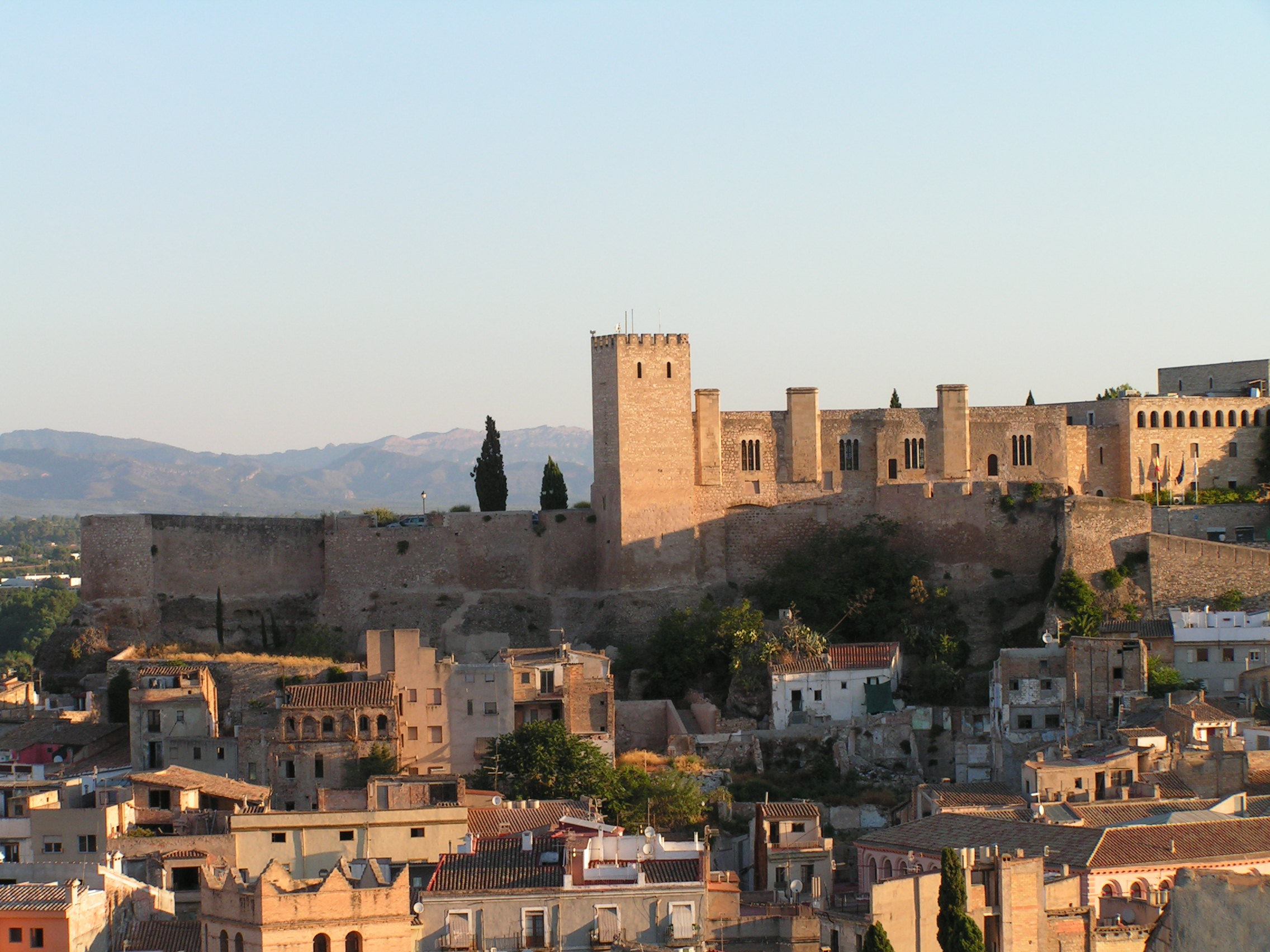
The city of Tortosa

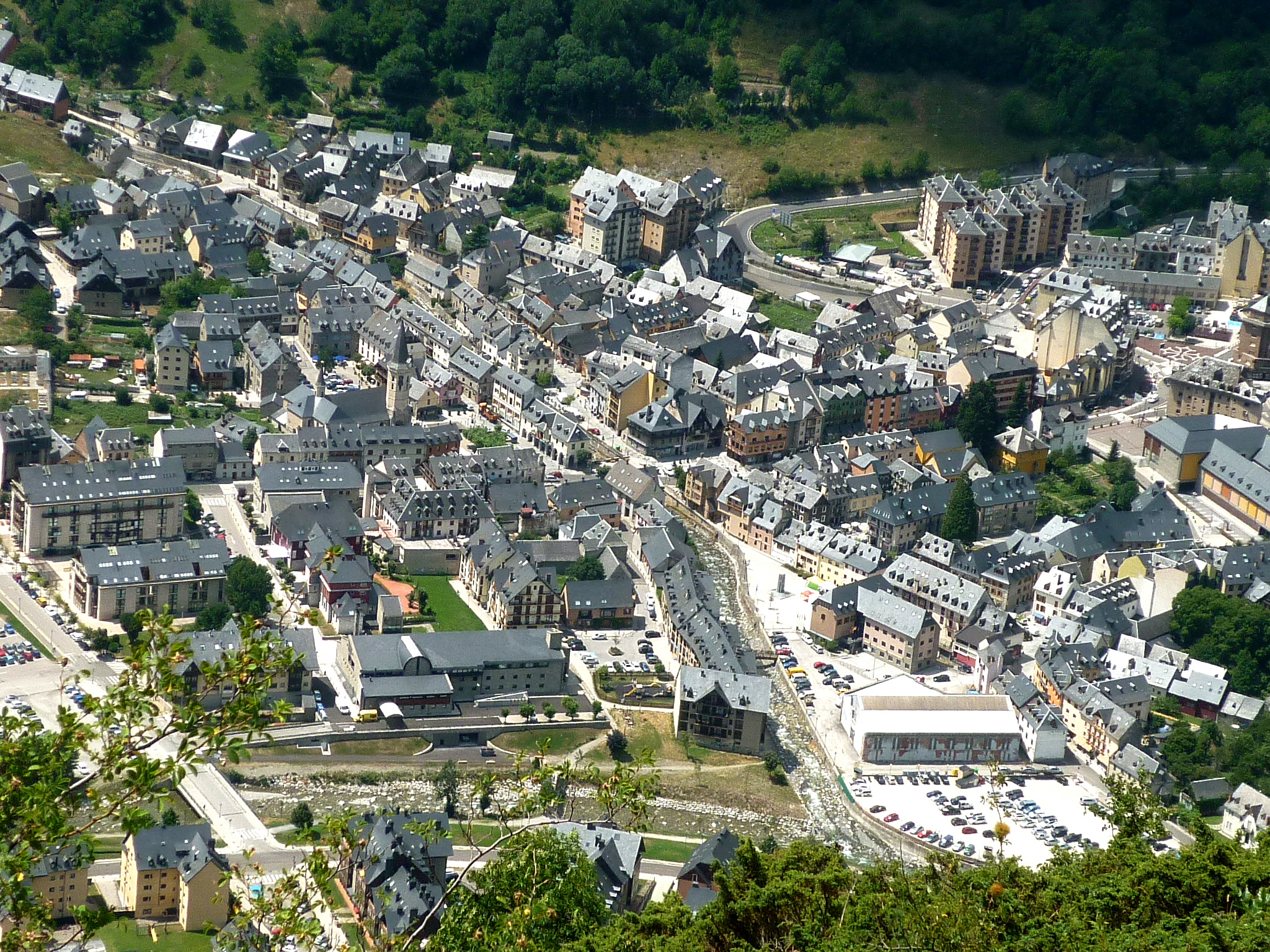
Vielha e Mijaran from the Vielha viewpoint

== Demographics ==
Historical population
Year	Pop.	±%
1842	1,048,936	—
1857	1,652,291	+57.5%
1877	1,764,132	+6.8%
1887	1,836,139	+4.1%
1900	1,984,115	+8.1%
1910	2,099,218	+5.8%
1920	2,355,908	+12.2%
1930	2,731,627	+15.9%
1940	2,915,757	+6.7%
1950	3,218,596	+10.4%
1960	3,888,485	+20.8%
1970	5,107,606	+31.4%
1981	5,956,414	+16.6%
1991	6,059,494	+1.7%
2001	6,343,110	+4.7%
2011	7,519,843	+18.6%
2021	7,749,896	+3.1%
Source: INE

As of 2025, the population is 8,124,126, of which 49.3% are males, and 50.7% are females. Minors make up 16.7% of the population, and seniors make up 19.7%.

In 1900, the population of Catalonia was 1,966,382 people and in 1970 it was 5,122,567. The sizeable increase of the population was due to the demographic boom in Spain during the 1960s and early 1970s as well as in consequence of large-scale internal migration from the rural economically weak regions to its more prospering industrial cities. In Catalonia, that wave of internal migration arrived from several regions of Spain, especially from Andalusia, Murcia and Extremadura. As of 1999, it was estimated that over 60% of Catalans descended from 20th century migrations from other parts of Spain.

=== Immigration ===
As of 2025, immigrants make up 25.1% of the population. The 5 largest foreign countries of birth are Morocco, Colombia, Argentina, Peru, and Ecuador.

Immigrants from other countries settled in Catalonia since the 1990s; a large percentage comes from Africa, Latin America and Eastern Europe, and smaller numbers from Asia and Southern Europe, often settling in urban centers such as Barcelona and industrial areas. In 2017, Catalonia had 940,497 foreign residents (11.9% of the total population) with non-Spanish ID cards, without including those who acquired Spanish citizenship.

Foreign-born population by country of birth (2025)
Country of birth	Population
Morocco	303,065
Colombia	160,238
Argentina	116,720
Peru	100,730
Ecuador	96,802
Venezuela	89,465
Honduras	82,713
Pakistan	74,418
Romania	73,234
China	58,753
Bolivia	53,662
Dominican Republic	50,871
France	48,125
Brazil	43,745
Russia	43,366
Ukraine	41,933
Italy	39,727
India	38,680
Senegal	30,241
Cuba	30,125
Paraguay	28,982
Chile	26,067
Uruguay	24,975
Germany	24,638
United Kingdom	24,314
Gambia	20,958
Mexico	18,925
Philippines	18,700
United States	16,132
Algeria	15,520
Bangladesh	11,723
Portugal	11,534
El Salvador	11,136
Georgia	10,382
Bulgaria	10,087

Foreign population by nationality in 2022
Region	Number	%
Total foreigners	1,271,810	100.0%
Europe	401,605	31.6%
European Union	295,896	23.0%
Other Europe	105,709	8.3%
Africa	324,260	25.5%
South America	247,821	19.5%
Central America	368,461	29.0%
North America	18,332	1.4%
Asia	184,846	14.5%
Oceania	1,015	0.1%

=== Religion ===
Religion in Catalonia (2020):
1. Roman Catholicism (53.0%)
2. Protestantism (7.00%)
3. Eastern Orthodoxy (1.30%)
4. Jehovah's Witnesses (1.00%)
5. Atheism (18.6%)
6. Agnosticism (8.80%)
7. Islam (4.30%)
8. Other Religions (3.40%)
9. No answer/do not know (2.60%)

Historically, all the Catalan population was Christian, specifically Catholic, but since the 1980s there has been a trend of decline of Christianity. Nevertheless, according to the most recent study sponsored by the Government of Catalonia, as of 2020, 62.3% of the Catalans identify as Christians (up from 61.9% in 2016 and 56.5% in 2014) of whom 53.0% Catholics, 7.0% Protestants and Evangelicals, 1.3% Orthodox Christians and 1.0% Jehovah's Witnesses. At the same time, 18.6% of the population identify as atheists, 8.8% as agnostics, 4.3% as Muslims, and a further 3.4% as being of other religions.

=== Largest cities and towns ===
The Urban Region of Barcelona includes 5,217,864 people and covers an area of 2,268 km^{2} (876 sq mi). The metropolitan area of the Urban Region includes cities such as L'Hospitalet de Llobregat, Sabadell, Terrassa, Badalona, Santa Coloma de Gramenet and Cornellà de Llobregat.

Largest municipalities in Catalonia INE – 2025
Rank		Comarca	Pop.	Rank		Comarca	Pop.
1	Barcelona	Barcelonès	1,713,247	11	Girona	Gironès	108,352
2	L'Hospitalet de Llobregat	Barcelonès	292,161	12	Sant Cugat del Vallès	Vallès Occidental	97,959
3	Terrassa	Vallès Occidental	232,676	13	Cornellà de Llobregat	Baix Llobregat	92,255
4	Badalona	Barcelonès	230,642	14	Sant Boi de Llobregat	Baix Llobregat	85,317
5	Sabadell	Vallès Occidental	224,589	15	Rubí	Vallès Occidental	82,825
6	Lleida	Segrià	147,369	16	Manresa	Bages	80,692
7	Tarragona	Tarragonès	143,260	17	Vilanova i la Geltrú	Garraf	71,305
8	Mataró	Maresme	131,370	18	Castelldefels	Baix Llobregat	69,689
9	Santa Coloma de Gramenet	Barcelonès	123,250	19	Viladecans	Baix Llobregat	67,536
10	Reus	Baix Camp	111,911	20	El Prat de Llobregat	Baix Llobregat	66,251

== Culture ==
=== Art and architecture ===
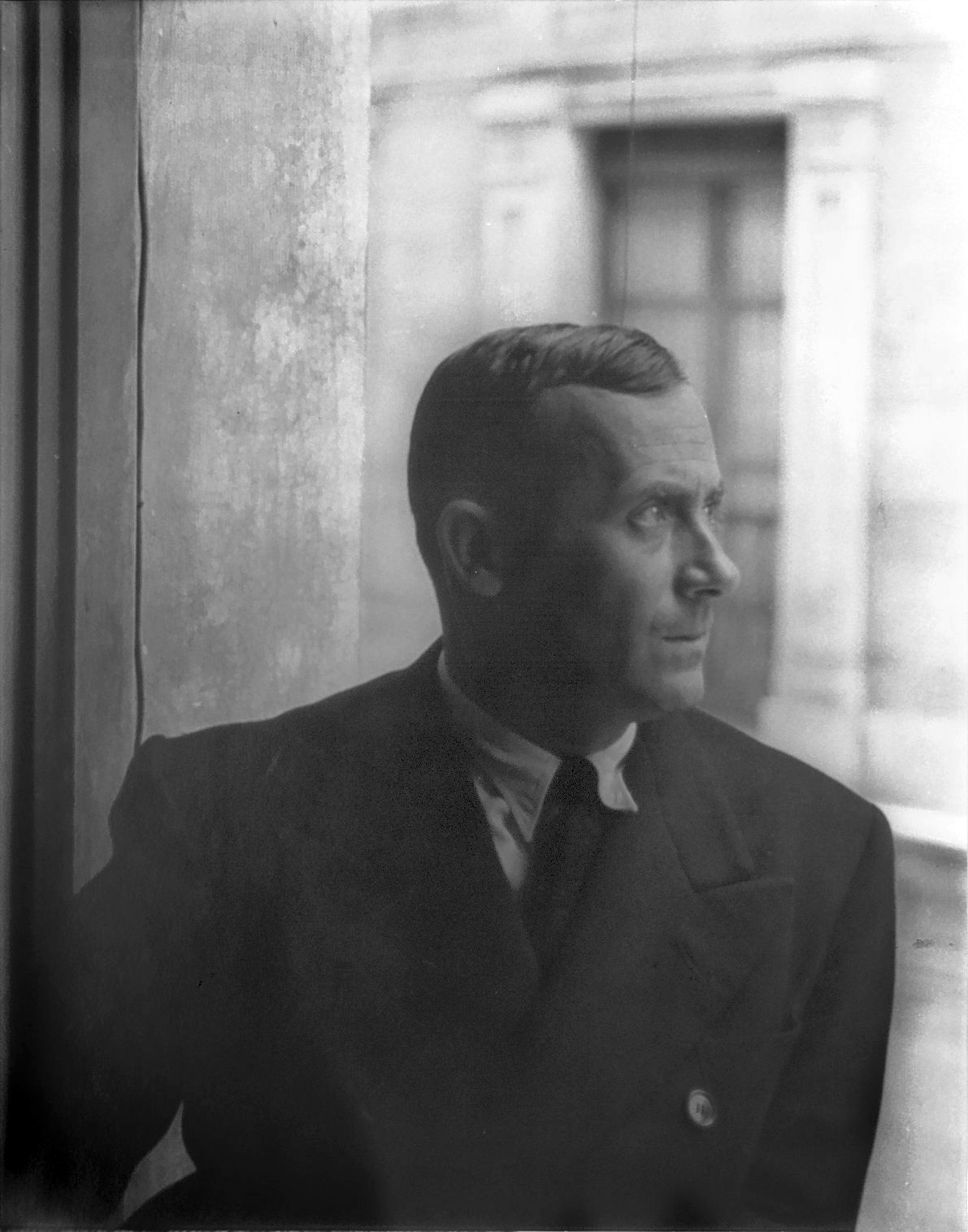
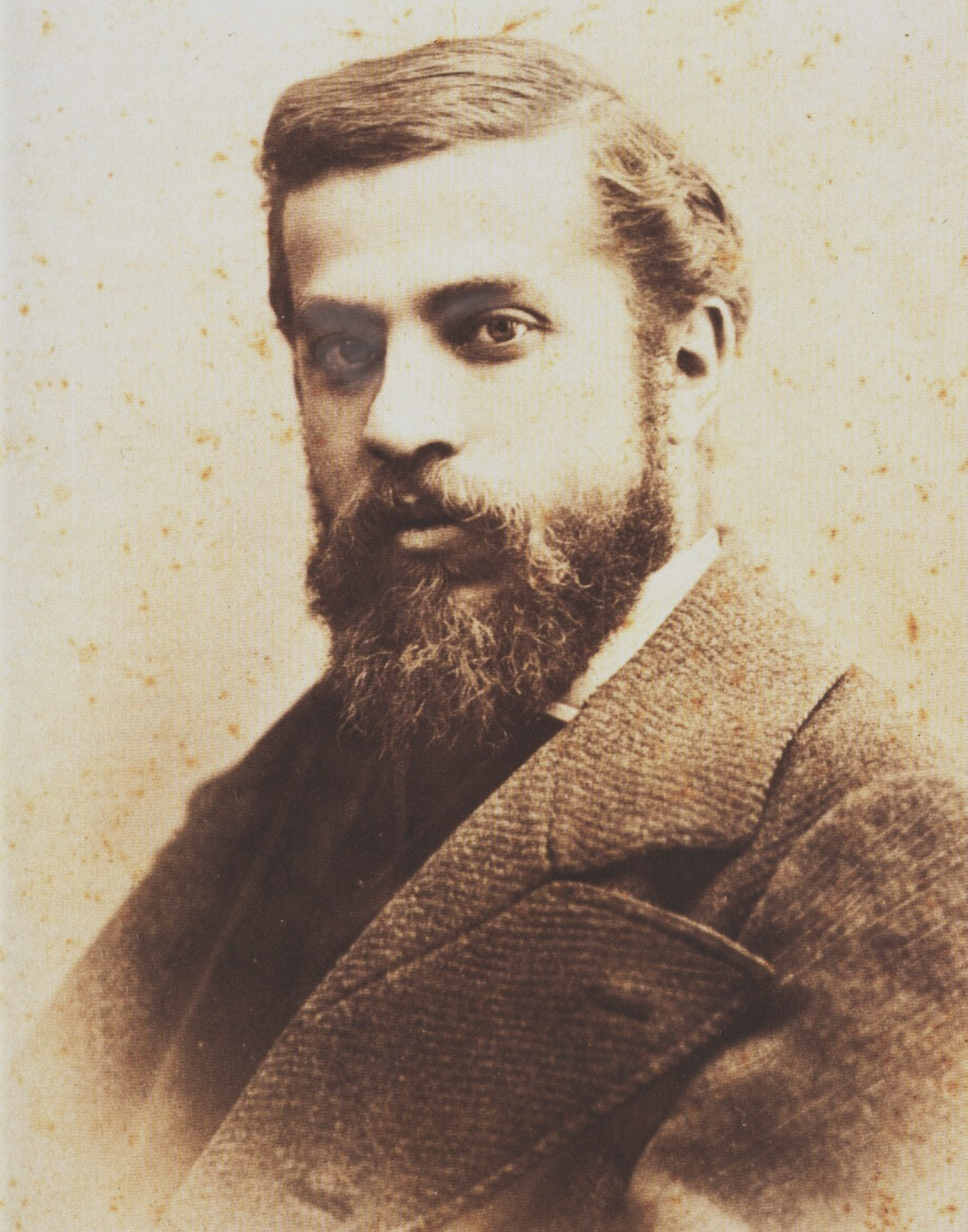
Left: Joan Miró. Right: Antoni Gaudí

Many important artists are from Catalonia. Salvador Dalí, Joan Miró and Antoni Tàpies are some of the most famous Catalan painters. Closely linked with the Catalan pictorial atmosphere, Pablo Picasso lived in Barcelona during his youth, training them as an artist and creating the movement of cubism. Other important artists include Claudi Lorenzale, for the medieval Romanticism that marked the artistic Renaixença; Marià Fortuny, for the Romanticism and Catalan Orientalism of the nineteenth century; Ramon Casas or Santiago Rusiñol, main representatives of the pictorial current of Catalan modernism from the end of the nineteenth century to the beginning of the twentieth century; Josep Maria Sert, for early 20th-century Noucentisme; or Josep Maria Subirachs, for expressionist or abstract sculpture and painting of the late twentieth century.

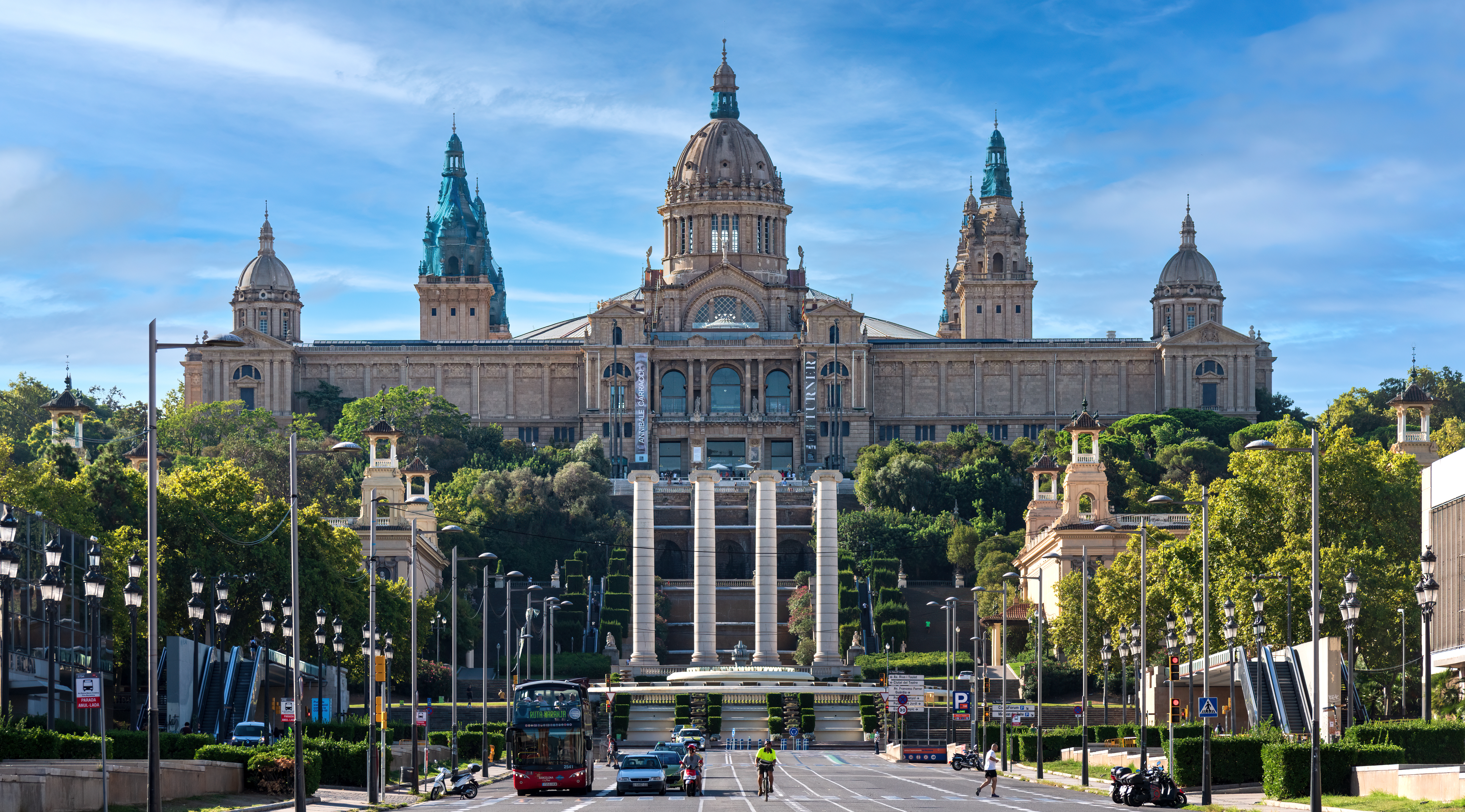
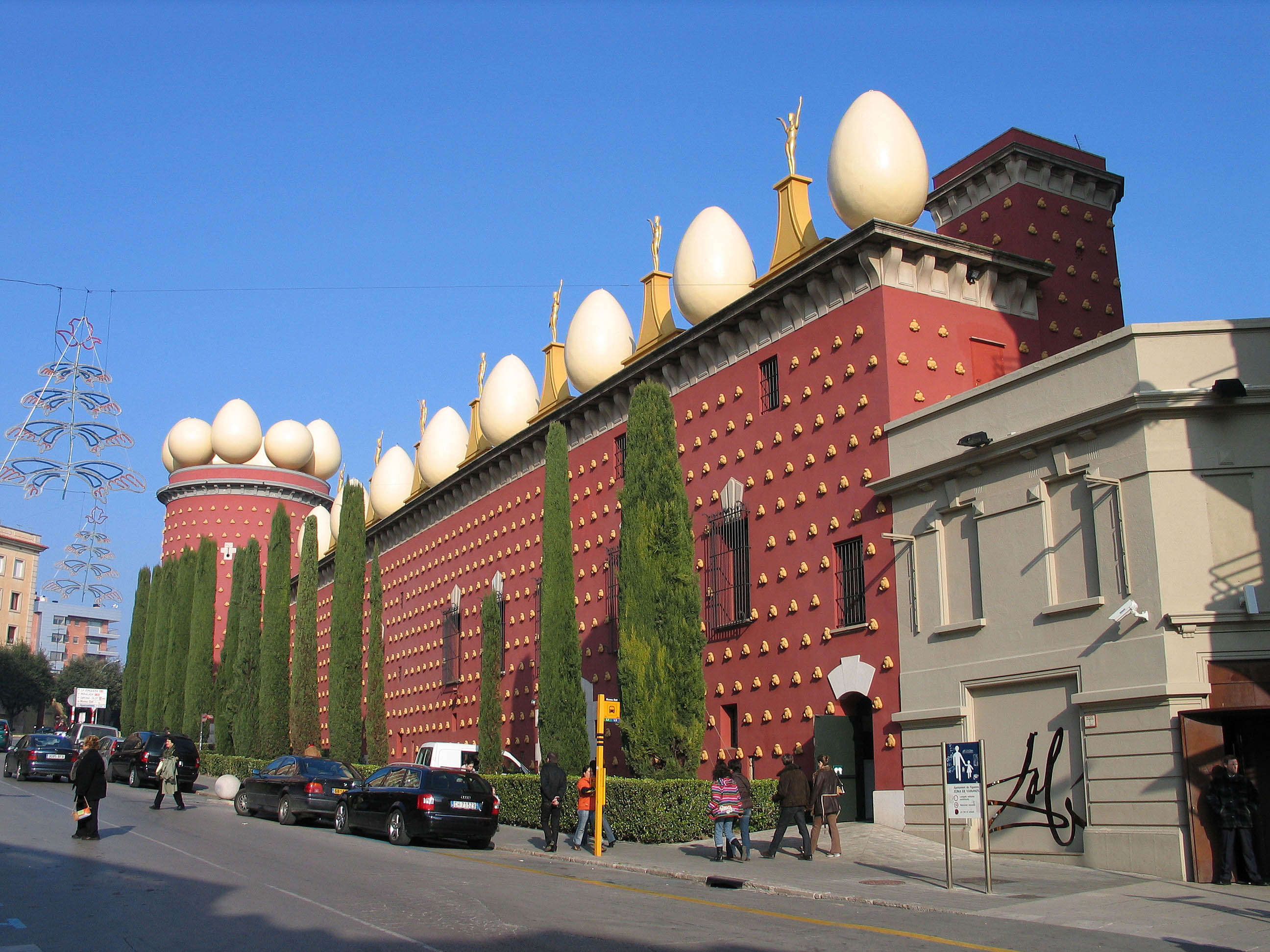
Left: Museu Nacional d'Art de Catalunya, Barcelona. Right: Dalí Museum, Figueres

The most important painting museums of Catalonia are the Teatre-Museu Dalí in Figueres, the National Art Museum of Catalonia (MNAC), Picasso Museum, Fundació Antoni Tàpies, Joan Miró Foundation, the Barcelona Museum of Contemporary Art (MACBA), the Centre of Contemporary Culture of Barcelona (CCCB), and the CaixaForum.

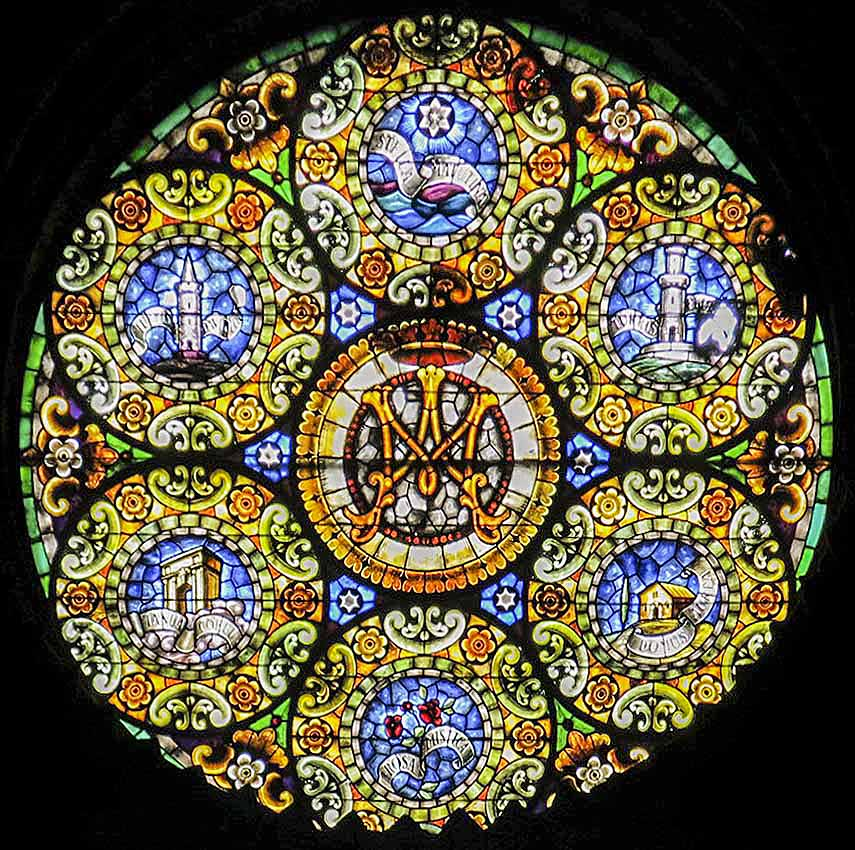
Rose window (Solsona Cathedral)

In the field of architecture were developed and adapted to Catalonia different artistic styles prevalent in Europe, leaving footprints in many churches, monasteries and cathedrals, of Romanesque (the best examples of which are located in the northern half of the territory) and Gothic styles. The Gothic developed in Barcelona and its area of influence is known as Catalan Gothic, with some particular characteristics. The church of Santa Maria del Mar is an example of this kind of style. During the Middle Ages, many fortified castles were built by feudal nobles to mark their powers.

There are some examples of Renaissance (such as the Palau de la Generalitat), Baroque and Neoclassical architectures. In the late nineteenth century Modernism (Art Nouveau) appeared as the national art. The world-renowned Catalan architects of this style are Antoni Gaudí, Lluís Domènech i Montaner and Josep Puig i Cadafalch. Thanks to the urban expansion of Barcelona during the last decades of the century and the first ones of the next, many buildings of the Eixample are in the modernist style. In the field of architectural rationalism, which turned especially relevant in Catalonia during the Republican era (1931–1939) highlighting Josep Lluís Sert and Josep Torres i Clavé, members of the GATCPAC and, in contemporary architecture, Ricardo Bofill and Enric Miralles.

==== Monuments and World Heritage Sites ====
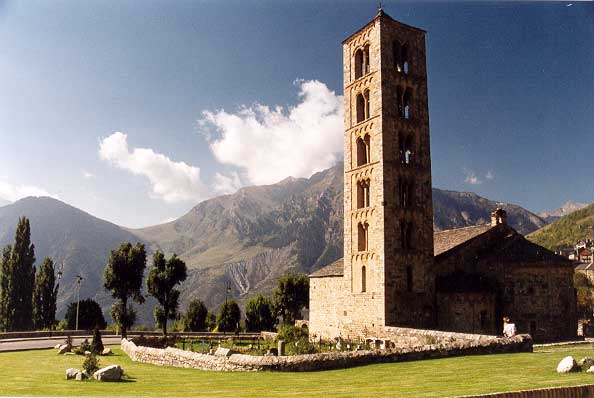
The medieval church of Sant Climent de Taüll, located in the foothills of the Pyrenees, in the province of Lleida

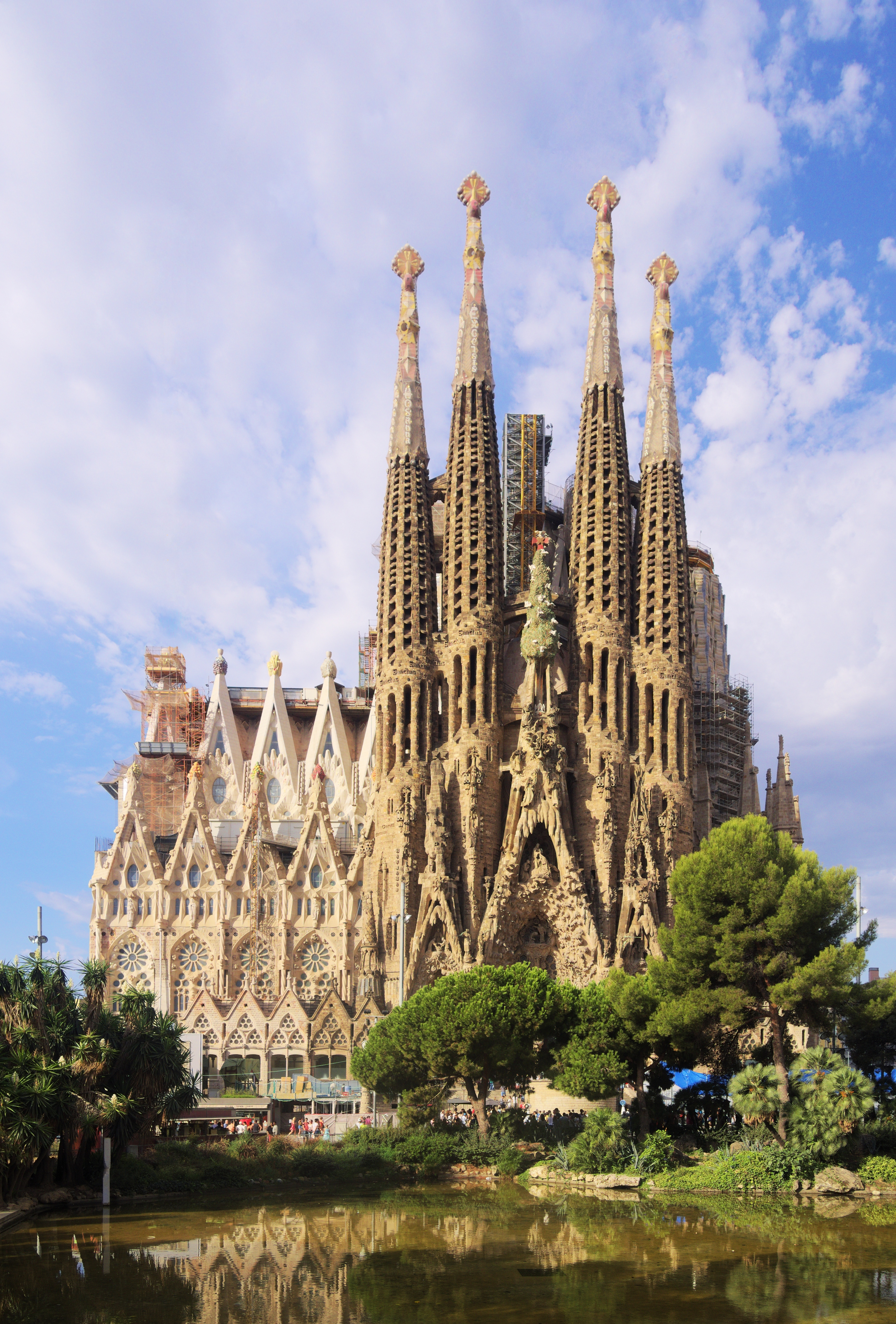
Sagrada Família, Barcelona

There are several UNESCO World Heritage Sites in Catalonia:

- Archaeological Ensemble of Tarraco, Tarragona
- Catalan Romanesque Churches of the Vall de Boí, Lleida province
- Poblet Monastery, Tarragona province
- Works of Lluís Domènech i Montaner:
  - Palau de la Música Catalana, Barcelona
  - Hospital de Sant Pau, Barcelona
- Works of Antoni Gaudí:
  - Sagrada Família, Barcelona
  - Parc Güell, Barcelona
  - Palau Güell, Barcelona
  - Casa Milà (La Pedrera), Barcelona
  - Casa Vicens, Barcelona
  - Casa Batlló, Barcelona
  - The Church of Colònia Güell, Santa Coloma de Cervelló, Barcelona province

=== Literature ===
The oldest surviving literary use of the Catalan language is considered to be the religious text known as Homilies d'Organyà, written either in the late 11th or early 12th century.

There are two historical moments of splendor of Catalan literature. The first begins with the historiographic chronicles of the 13th century (chronicles written between the thirteenth and fourteenth centuries narrating the deeds of the monarchs and leading figures of the Crown of Aragon) and the subsequent Golden Age of the 14th and 15th centuries. After that period, between the 16th and 19th centuries the Romantic historiography defined this era as the Decadència, considered as the "decadent" period in Catalan literature because of a general falling into disuse of the vernacular language in cultural contexts and lack of patronage among the nobility.

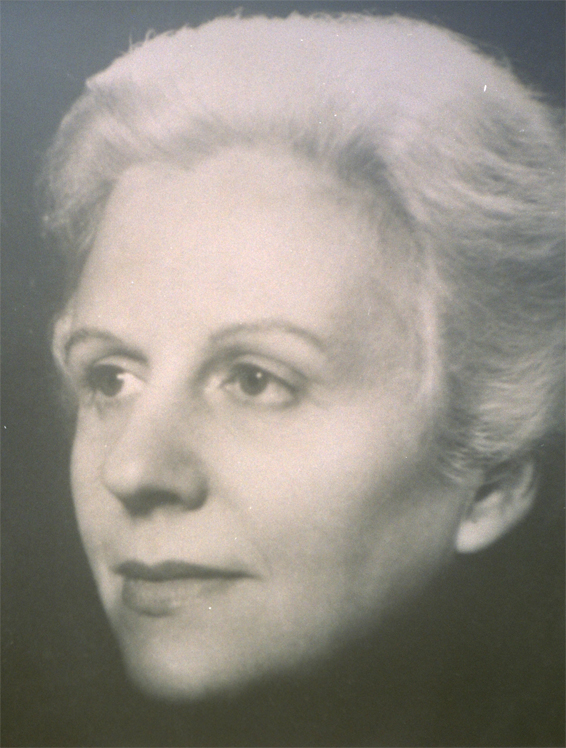
Mercè Rodoreda

The second moment of splendor began in the 19th century with the cultural and political Renaixença (Renaissance) represented by writers and poets such as Jacint Verdaguer, Víctor Català (pseudonym of Caterina Albert i Paradís), Narcís Oller, Joan Maragall and Àngel Guimerà. During the 20th century, avant-garde movements developed, initiated by the Generation of '14 (called Noucentisme in Catalonia), represented by Eugenio d'Ors, Joan Salvat-Papasseit, Josep Carner, Carles Riba, J.V. Foix and others. During the dictatorship of Primo de Rivera, the Civil War (Generation of '36) and the Francoist period, Catalan literature was maintained despite the repression against the Catalan language, being often produced in exile.

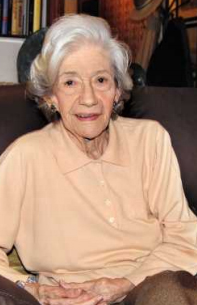
Ana María Matute

The most outstanding authors of this period are Salvador Espriu, Josep Pla, Josep Maria de Sagarra (who are considered mainly responsible for the renewal of Catalan prose), Mercè Rodoreda, Joan Oliver Sallarès or "Pere Quart", Pere Calders, Gabriel Ferrater, Manuel de Pedrolo, Agustí Bartra or Miquel Martí i Pol. In addition, several foreign writers who fought in the International Brigades, or other military units, have since recounted their experiences of fighting in their works, historical or fictional, with, for example, George Orwell, in Homage to Catalonia (1938) or Claude Simon's Le Palace (1962) and Les Géorgiques (1981).

After the transition to democracy (1975–1978) and the restoration of the Generalitat (1977), literary life and the editorial market have returned to normality and literary production in Catalan is being bolstered with a number of language policies intended to protect Catalan culture. Besides the aforementioned authors, other relevant 20th-century writers of the Francoist and democracy periods include Joan Brossa, Agustí Bartra, Manuel de Pedrolo, Pere Calders or Quim Monzó.

Ana María Matute, Jaime Gil de Biedma, Manuel Vázquez Montalbán and Juan Goytisolo are among the most prominent Catalan writers in the Spanish language since the democratic restoration in Spain.

=== Festivals and public holidays ===
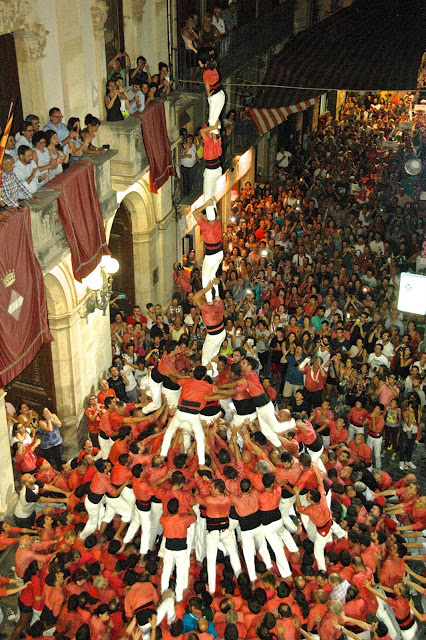
Castell 4 de 9 amb folre i pilar by Colla Vella de Valls

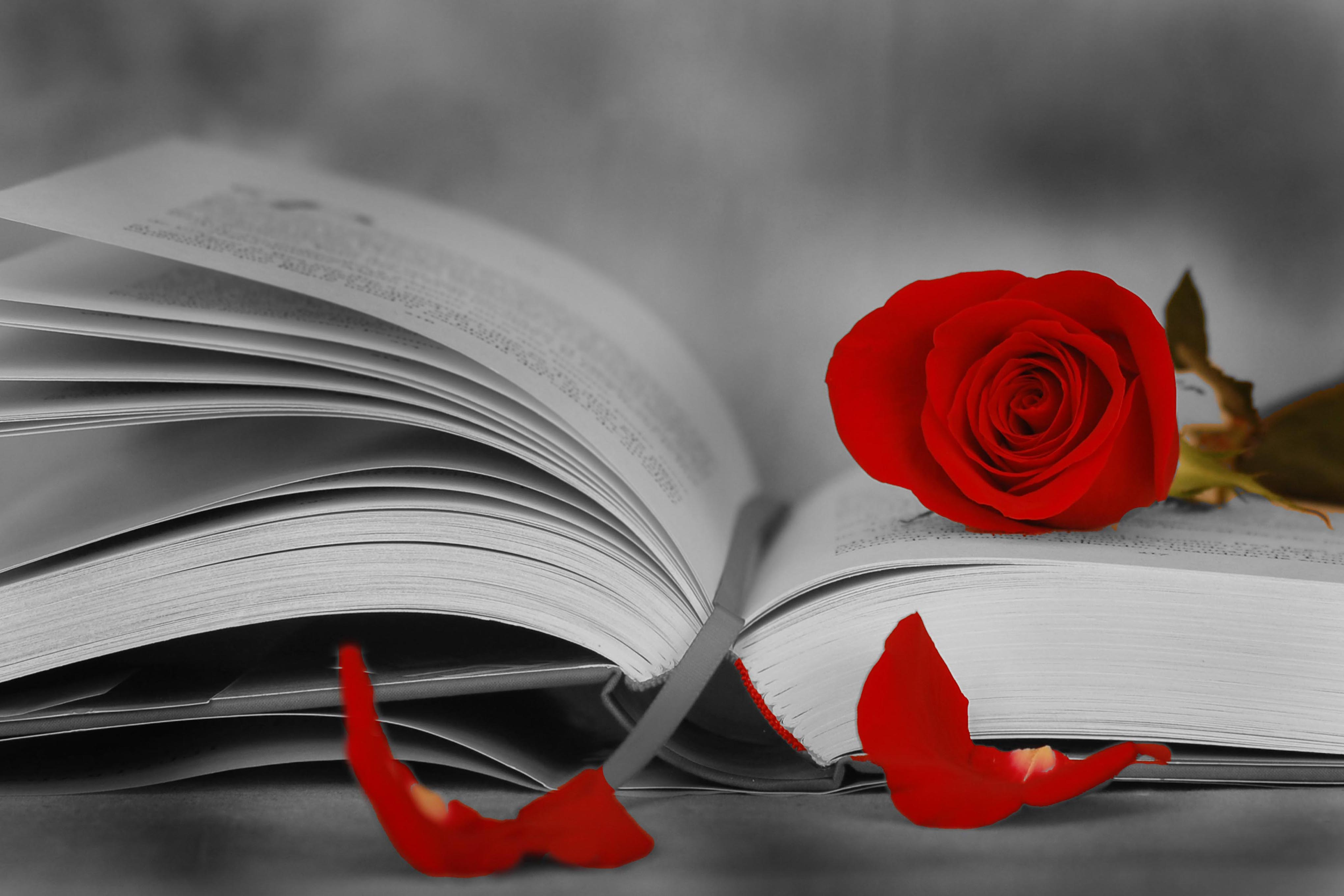
A rose and a book, the two iconic elements of Saint George's Day in Catalonia

Castells are one of the main manifestations of Catalan popular culture. The activity consists in constructing human towers by competing colles castelleres (teams). This practice originated in Valls, in the region of the Camp de Tarragona, during the 18th century, and later it was extended to the rest of the territory, especially in the late 20th century. The tradition of els Castells i els Castellers was declared Masterpiece of the Oral and Intangible Heritage of Humanity by UNESCO in 2010.

In main celebrations, other elements of the Catalan popular culture are also usually present: parades with gegants (giants), bigheads, stick-dancers and musicians, and the correfoc, where devils and monsters dance and spray showers of sparks using firecrackers. Another traditional celebration in Catalonia is La Patum de Berga, declared a Masterpiece of the Oral and Intangible Heritage of Humanity by the UNESCO on 25 November 2005.

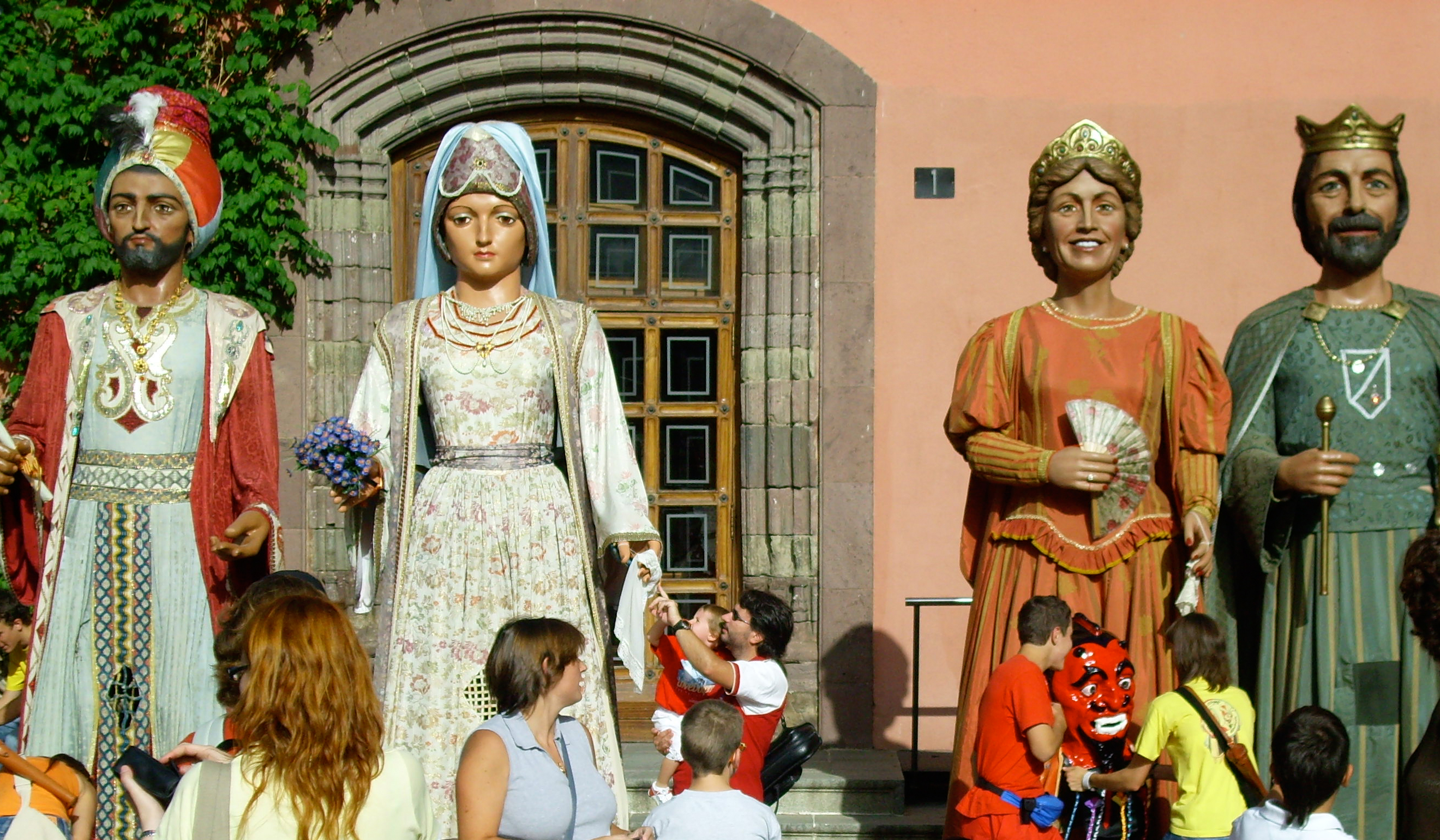
Gegants i capgrossos during the festa major of La Seu d'Urgell

St. George's Day (Diada de Sant Jordi) is a widely celebrated festival in all Catalan towns on 23 April dedicated to the patron saint of Catalonia in a tradition established in the Middle Ages, which nowadays includes an exchange of books and roses between sweethearts and loved ones, therefore, serving to the same romantic purpose that of Saint Valentine's Day in Anglophone countries. Despite being a working day, it is regarded as one of Catalan national holidays due to its popularity.

Christmas in Catalonia lasts two days, plus Christmas Eve. On the 25th, Christmas is celebrated, followed by a similar feast on the 26, called Sant Esteve (Saint Steve's Day). This allows families to visit and dine with different sectors of the extended family or get together with friends on the second day.

One of the most deeply rooted Christmas traditions is the popular figure of the Tió de Nadal, consisting of an (often hollow) log with a face painted on it and often two little front legs appended, usually wearing a Catalan hat and scarf. The word has nothing to do with the Spanish word tío, meaning uncle. Tió means log in Catalan. The log is sometimes "found in the woods" (in an event staged for children) and then adopted and taken home, where it is fed and cared for during a month or so. On Christmas Day or on Christmas Eve, a game is played where children march around the house singing a song requesting the log to poop, then they hit the log with a stick, to make it poop, and lo and behold, as if through magic, it poops candy, and sometimes other small gifts. Usually, the larger or main gifts are brought by the Three Kings on 6 January, and the tió only brings small things.

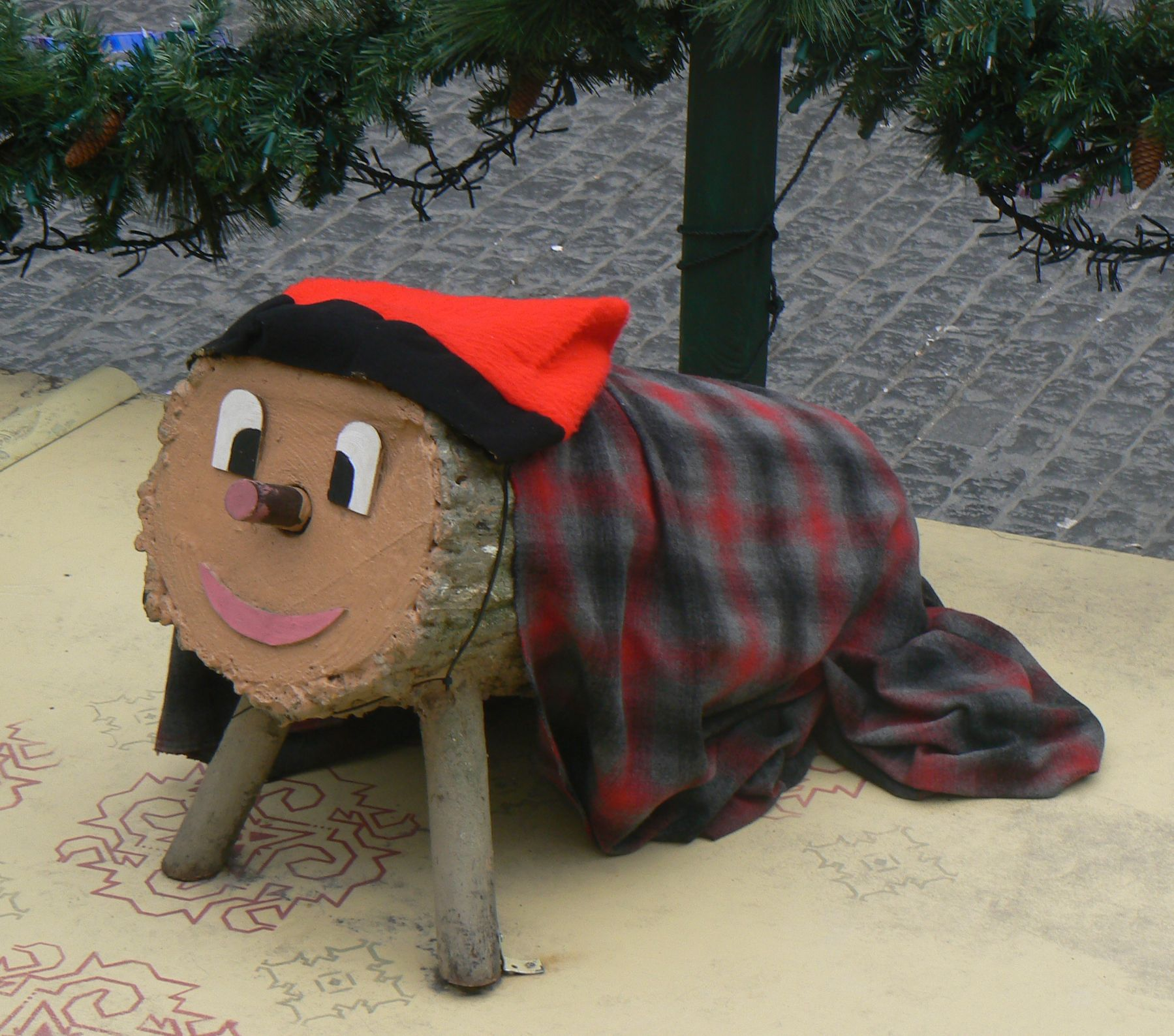
A tió exhibited at Plaça Sant Jaume in Barcelona in the 2010–2011 Christmas season

In addition to traditional local Catalan culture, traditions from other parts of Spain can be found as a result of migration from other regions, for instance the celebration of the Andalusian Feria de Abril in Catalonia.

On 28 July 2010, second only after the Canary Islands, Catalonia became another Spanish territory to forbid bullfighting. The ban, which went into effect on 1 January 2012, had originated in a popular petition supported by over 180,000 signatures.

=== Music and dance ===
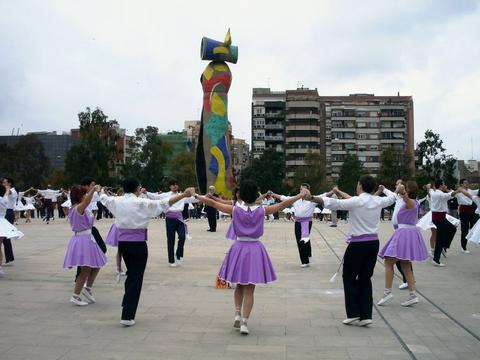
Sardana

The sardana is considered to be the most characteristic Catalan folk dance, interpreted to the rhythm of tamborí, tible and tenora (from the oboe family), trumpet, trombó (trombone), fiscorn (family of bugles) and contrabaix with three strings played by a cobla, and are danced in a circle dance. Other tunes and dances of the traditional music are the contrapàs (obsolete today), ball de bastons (the "dance of sticks"), the moixiganga, the goigs (popular songs), the galops or the jota in the southern part. The havaneres are characteristic in some marine localities of the Costa Brava, especially during the summer months when these songs are sung outdoors accompanied by a cremat of burned rum.

Art music was first developed, as in much of Europe, in a liturgical setting, particularly marked by the Escolania de Montserrat. The main Western musical trends have marked these productions, medieval monodies or polyphonies, with the work of Abbot Oliba in the eleventh century or the compilation Llibre Vermell de Montserrat ("Red Book of Montserrat") from the fourteenth century. Through the Renaissance there were authors such as Pere Albert Vila, Joan Brudieu or the two Mateu Fletxa ("The Old" and "The Young"). Baroque had composers like Joan Cererols. Romantic music was represented by composers such as Fernando Sor, Josep Anselm Clavé (the father of the choir movement in Catalonia and responsible for the revival of folk music) or Felip Pedrell.

Modernisme also expressed in musical terms from the end of the 19th century onwards, mixing folkloric and post-romantic influences, through the works of Isaac Albéniz and Enric Granados. The avant-garde spirit initiated by the modernists is prolonged throughout the twentieth century, thanks to the activities of the Orfeó Català, a choral society founded in 1891, with its monumental concert hall, the Palau de la Música Catalana in Catalan, built by Lluís Domènech i Montaner from 1905 to 1908, the Barcelona Symphony Orchestra created in 1944 and composers, conductors and musicians engaged against the Francoism like Robert Gerhard, Eduard Toldrà and Pau Casals.

Performances of opera, mostly imported from Italy, began in the 18th century, but some native operas were written as well, including the ones by Domènec Terradellas, Carles Baguer, Ramon Carles, Isaac Albéniz and Enric Granados. The Barcelona main opera house, Gran Teatre del Liceu (opened in 1847), remains one of the most important in Spain, hosting one of the most prestigious music schools in Barcelona, the Conservatori Superior de Música del Liceu. Several lyrical artists trained by this institution gained international renown during the 20th century, such as Victoria de los Ángeles, Montserrat Caballé, Giacomo Aragall and Josep Carreras.

Cellist Pau Casals is admired as an outstanding player. Other popular musical styles were born in the second half of the 20th century such as Nova Cançó from the 1960s with Lluís Llach and the group Els Setze Jutges, the Catalan rumba in the 1960s with Peret, Catalan Rock from the late 1970s with La Banda Trapera del Río and Decibelios for Punk Rock, Sau, Els Pets, Sopa de Cabra or Lax'n'Busto for pop rock or Sangtraït for hard rock, electropop since the 1990s with OBK and indie pop from the 1990s.

=== Languages ===
First habitual language, 2018 Demographic Survey
Language	Identification language	Habitual language
Spanish	2,978,000 (46.6%)	3,104,000 (48.6%)
Catalan	2,320,000 (36.3%)	2,305,000 (36.1%)
Both languages	440,000 (6.9%)	474,000 (7.4%)
Other languages	651,000 (10.2%)	504,000 (7.9%)
Arabic	114,000 (1.8%)	61,000 (0.9%)
Romanian	58,000 (0.9%)	24,000 (0.4%)
English	29,000 (0.5%)	26,000 (0.4%)
French	26,000 (0.4%)	16,000 (0.2%)
Berber	25,000 (0.4%)	20,000 (0.3%)
Chinese	20,000 (0.3%)	18,000 (0.3%)
Other languages	281,000 (4.4%)	153,000 (2.4%)
Other combinations	96,000 (1.5%)	193,000 (3.0%)
Total population 15 years old and over	6,386,000 (100.0%)	6,386,000 (100.0%)

Catalan-speaking lands of Europe (grey), often known as the Catalan Countries

Originating in the historic territory of Catalonia, Catalan is the official language of the Autonomous Community and has enjoyed special status since the approval of the Statute of Autonomy of 1979 which declares it to be "Catalonia's own language", a term which signifies a language given special legal status within a Spanish territory, or which is historically spoken within a given region. The other languages considered official in Catalonia are Spanish, which has official status throughout Spain, and Aranese Occitan, considered the "own language" of the Val d'Aran territory. Given this, the sole official language for toponymy throughout Catalonia is Catalan, except in the Val d'Aran where Occitan fulfils this role.

According to the linguistic census held by the Government of Catalonia in 2013, Spanish is the most spoken language in Catalonia (46.53% claim Spanish as "their own language"), followed by Catalan (37.26% claim Catalan as "their own language"). In everyday use, 11.95% of the population claim to use both languages equally, whereas 45.92% mainly use Spanish and 35.54% mainly use Catalan. There is a significant difference between the Barcelona metropolitan area (and, to a lesser extent, the Tarragona area), where Spanish is more spoken than Catalan, and the more rural and small town areas, where Catalan clearly prevails over Spanish.

Since the Statute of Autonomy of 1979, Aranese (a Gascon dialect of Occitan) has also been official and subject to special protection in Val d'Aran. This small area of 7,000 inhabitants was the only place where a dialect of Occitan had received full official status. Then, on 9 August 2006, when the new Statute came into force, Occitan became official throughout Catalonia. Occitan is the mother tongue of 22.4% of the population of Val d'Aran, which has attracted heavy immigration from other Spanish regions to work in the service industry. Catalan Sign Language is also officially recognised.

Although not considered an "official language" in the same way as Catalan, Spanish, and Occitan, the Catalan Sign Language, with about 18,000 users in Catalonia, is granted official recognition and support: "The public authorities shall guarantee the use of Catalan sign language and conditions of equality for deaf people who choose to use this language, which shall be the subject of education, protection and respect."

As was the case since the ascent of the Bourbon dynasty to the throne of Spain after the War of the Spanish Succession, and with the exception of the short period of the Second Spanish Republic, under Francoist Spain Catalan was banned from schools and all other official use, so that for example families were not allowed to officially register children with Catalan names. During the Francoist period especially, the Spanish Government actively suppressed the Catalan language, criminalizing its public usage, promoting both diglossia and linguistic substitution. Although never completely banned, Catalan language publishing was severely restricted during the early 1940s, with only religious texts and small-run self-published texts being released. Some books were published clandestinely or circumvented the restrictions by showing publishing dates prior to 1936. This policy was changed in 1946, when restricted publishing in Catalan resumed.

Rural–urban migration originating in other parts of Spain also reduced the social use of Catalan in urban areas and increased the use of Spanish. Lately, a similar sociolinguistic phenomenon has occurred with foreign immigration. Catalan cultural activity increased in the 1960s and the teaching of Catalan began thanks to the initiative of associations such as Òmnium Cultural.

After the end of Francoist Spain, the newly established self-governing democratic institutions in Catalonia embarked on a long-term language policy to recover the use of Catalan and has, since 1983, enforced laws which attempt to protect and extend the use of Catalan. This policy, known as the "linguistic normalisation" (normalització lingüística in Catalan, normalización lingüística in Spanish) has been supported by the vast majority of Catalan political parties through the last thirty years. Some groups consider these efforts a way to discourage the use of Spanish, whereas some others, including the Catalan government and the European Union consider the policies respectful, or even as an example which "should be disseminated throughout the Union".

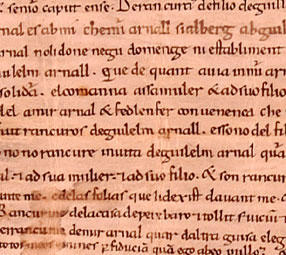
Fragment of the Greuges de Guirard Isarn (c. 1080–1095), one of the earliest texts written almost completely in Catalan, predating the famous Homilies d'Organyà by a century

Today, Catalan is the main language of the Catalan autonomous government and the other public institutions that fall under its jurisdiction. Basic public education is given mainly in Catalan, but also there are some hours per week of Spanish language instruction. Although the law requiring businesses to display all information (e.g. menus, posters) at least in Catalan is not systematically enforced, the majority of the linguistic landscape in Catalonia is monolingually in Catalan. There is no obligation to display this information in either Occitan or Spanish, although there is no restriction on doing so in these or other languages and sometimes private businesses will display their information in Spanish or English as well. The use of fines was introduced in a 1997 linguistic law that aims to increase the public use of Catalan and defend the rights of Catalan speakers. On the other hand, the Spanish Constitution does not recognise equal language rights for linguistic minorities since it enshrined Spanish as the only official language of the state, the knowledge of which being compulsory. Numerous laws regarding for instance the labelling of pharmaceutical products, make in effect Spanish the only language of compulsory use.

The law ensures that both Catalan and Spanish – being official languages – can be used by the citizens without prejudice in all public and private activities. The Generalitat uses Catalan in its communications and notifications addressed to the general population, but citizens can also receive information from the Generalitat in Spanish if they so wish. Debates in the Catalan Parliament take place almost exclusively in Catalan and the Catalan public television broadcasts programs in Catalan.

Due to the rising immigration which Spain in general and Catalonia in particular experienced in the first decade of the 21st century, many foreign languages are spoken in various cultural communities in Catalonia, of which Rif-Berber, Moroccan Arabic, Romanian and Urdu are the most common ones.

In Catalonia, there is a high social and political consensus on the language policies favoring Catalan, also among Spanish speakers and speakers of other languages. However, some of these policies have been criticised for trying to promote Catalan by imposing fines on businesses. For example, following the passage of the law on Catalan cinema in March 2010, which established that half of the movies shown in Catalan cinemas had to be in Catalan, a general strike of 75% of the cinemas took place. The Catalan government gave in and dropped the clause that forced 50% of the movies to be dubbed or subtitled in Catalan before the law came to effect. On the other hand, organisations such as Plataforma per la Llengua reported different violations of the linguistic rights of the Catalan speakers in Catalonia and the other Catalan-speaking territories in Spain, most of them caused by the institutions of the Spanish government in these territories.

The Catalan language policy has been challenged by some political parties in the Catalan Parliament. Citizens, a now extra-parliamentary party, is credited with breaking the consensus around language policy in the late 2000 through the 2010s. Nowadays, the far-right ultra Spanish nationalist party Vox is the main supporter of a linguistic policy that favours Spanish in Catalonia. The Catalan branch of the People's Party has a more ambiguous position on the issue: on one hand, it demands a bilingual Catalan–Spanish education and a more balanced language policy that would defend Catalan without favoring it over Spanish, whereas on the other hand, a few local PP politicians have supported in their municipalities measures privileging Catalan over Spanish and it has defended some aspects of the official language policies, sometimes against the positions of its colleagues from other parts of Spain. It must be stated, however, that historically none of these three parties have held significant offices in either regional or local government, never having governed the Generalitat, presided any Diputació or Consell Comarcal and as of 2025 having 4 mayors out of 947.

=== Media and cinema ===
Logo of Televisió de Catalunya

Catalonia is the autonomous community, along with Madrid, that has the most media (TV, magazines, newspapers etc.). In Catalonia there is a wide variety of local and comarcal media. With the restoration of democracy, many newspapers and magazines, until then in the hands of the Franco government, were recovered in order to convert them into free and democratic media, while local radio and television began broadcasting.

Televisió de Catalunya, which broadcasts entirely in the Catalan language, is the main Catalan public network. It has five channels: TV3, El 33, Super3, 3CatInfo, Esport3 and TV3CAT. In 2018, TV3 became the first television channel to be the most viewed for nine consecutive years in Catalonia. State television channels which broadcast in Catalonia in the Spanish language include Televisión Española (with few emissions in Catalan), Antena 3, Cuatro, Telecinco, and La Sexta. Other smaller Catalan television channels include local television channels, notably betevé, owned by the City Council of Barcelona, and broadcast in Catalan.

The two main Catalan newspapers of general information are El Periódico de Catalunya and La Vanguardia, both with editions in Catalan and Spanish. Newspapers which only publish in Catalan include Ara and El Punt Avui (from the fusion of El Punt and Avui in 2011), as well as most of the local press. The Spanish newspapers, such as El País, El Mundo or La Razón, also have Catalan editions.

Catalonia has a long tradition of use of radio, the first regular radio broadcast in the country was from Ràdio Barcelona in 1924. Today, the public Catalunya Ràdio (owned by Catalan Media Corporation) and the private RAC 1 (belonging to Grup Godó) are the two main radio stations of Catalonia, both in Catalan.

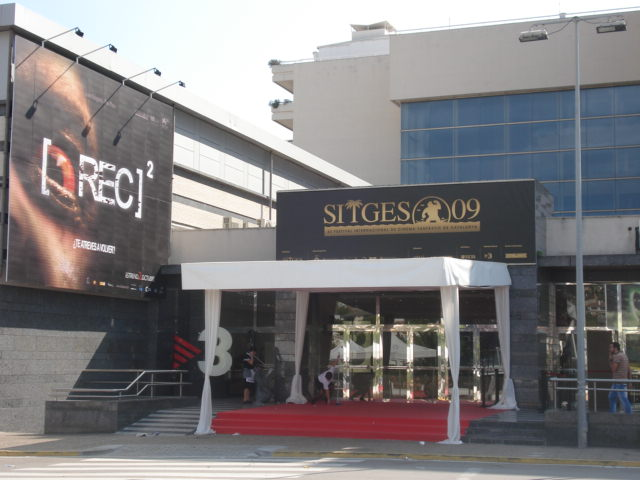
Sitges Film Festival of 2009

Regarding the cinema, after the democratic transition, three styles have dominated since then. First, auteur cinema, in the continuity of the Barcelona School, emphasises experimentation and form, while focusing on developing social and political themes. Done first by Josep Maria Forn or Bigas Luna, then by Marc Recha, Jaime Rosales and Albert Serra, this genre has achieved some international recognition. Then, the documentary became another genre particularly representative of contemporary Catalan cinema, boosted by Joaquim Jordà i Català and José Luis Guerín. Later, horror films and thrillers have also emerged as a specialty of the Catalan film industry, thanks in particular to the vitality of the Sitges Film Festival, created in 1968. Several directors have gained worldwide renown thanks to this genre, starting with Jaume Balagueró and his series REC (co-directed with Valencian Paco Plaza), Juan Antonio Bayona and El Orfanato or Jaume Collet-Serra with Orphan, Unknown and Non-Stop.

Catalan actors have shot for Spanish and international productions, such as Sergi López.

The Museum of Cinema - Tomàs Mallol Collection (Museu del Cinema – Col.lecció Tomàs Mallol in Catalan) of Girona is home of important permanent exhibitions of cinema and pre-cinema objects. Other important institutions for the promotion of cinema are the Gaudí Awards (Premis Gaudí in Catalan, which replaced from 2009 Barcelona Film Awards themselves created in 2002), serving as equivalent for Catalonia to the Spanish Goya or French César.

=== National symbols ===
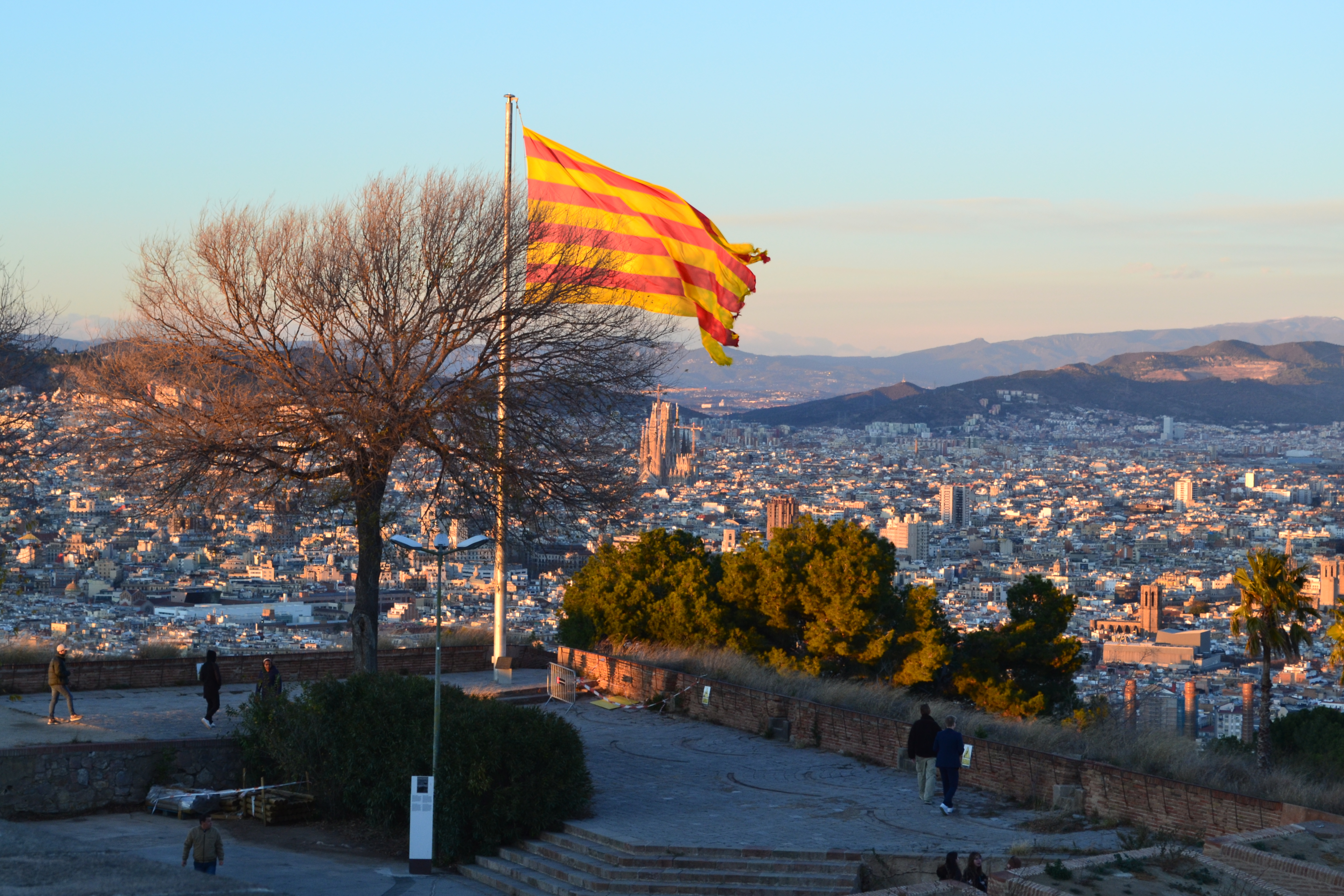
The flag of Catalonia flying on the Montjuïc Castle, Barcelona

Catalonia has its own representative and distinctive national symbols, some of them officially recognised, such as:

- The flag of Catalonia, popularly known as the Senyera, is a vexillological symbol based on the coat of arms of the Crown of Aragon, which consists of four red stripes on a golden background. It has been an official symbol since 25 May 1933.
- The National Day of Catalonia is on 11 September, and it is commonly called the Diada. It commemorates the 1714 siege of Barcelona resistance and capitulation at the end of the War of the Spanish Succession.
- The national anthem of Catalonia is Els Segadors and was written in its present form by Emili Guanyavents in 1899. The song is official by law from 25 February 1993. It is based on the events of 1640 during the Reapers' War.

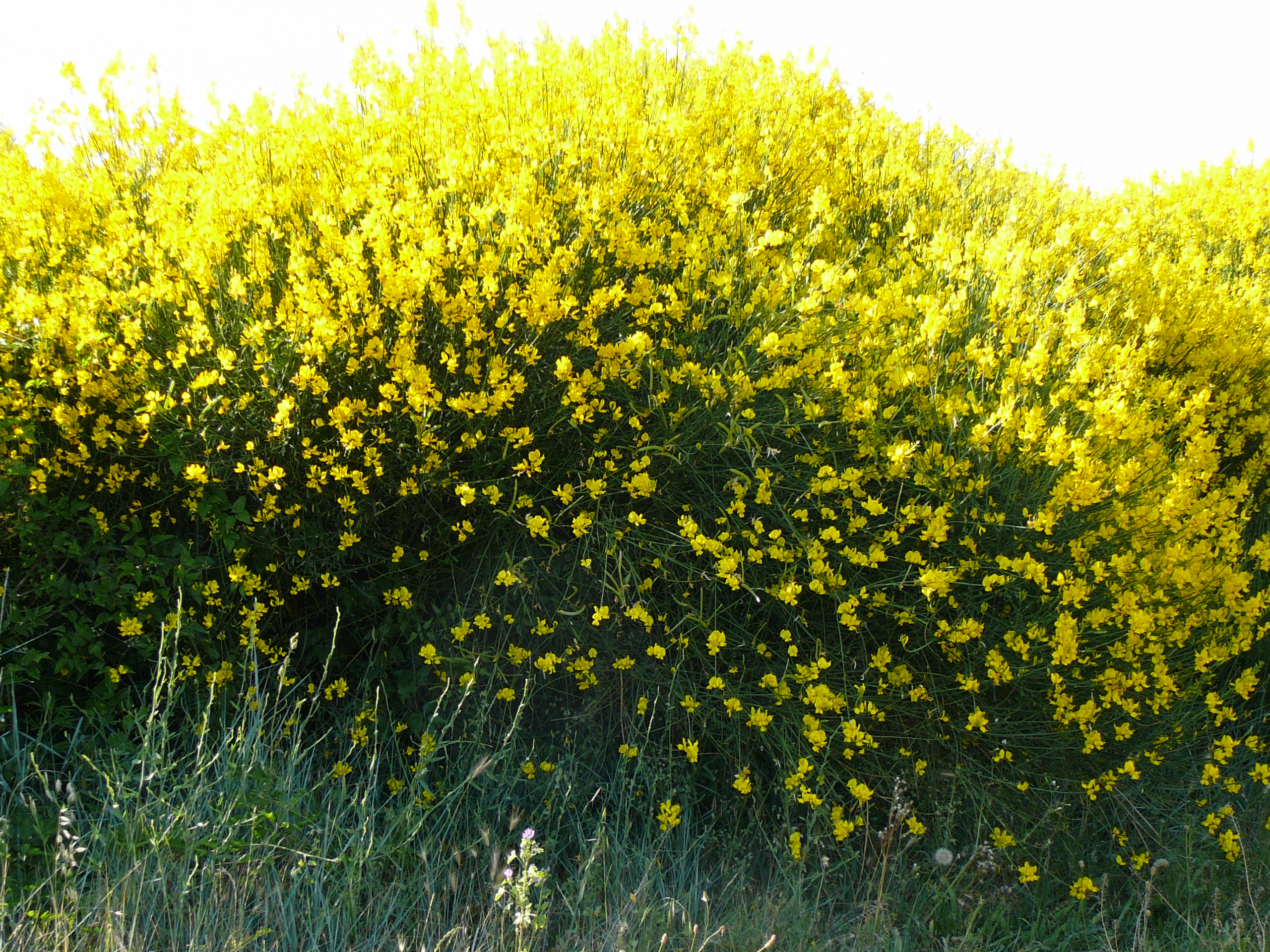
Weaver's broom, the national flower of Catalonia

In addition, various celebrations, objects, images, people or cultural icons maintain recognition at national or international level as Catalan national symbols. Certain former institutions from the Principality of Catalonia, like the Catalan constitutions and Usatges, the Consell de Cent and the Catalan Courts are valued as historical Catalan forms of government. Places like the Poblet Monastery where the ancient monarchs lie buried are especially revered. Many of these symbols come from Catalan folklore, like the sardana dance, the castells, gegants i capgrossos, correfoc, Saint George's Day, as well as the wyvern.

The yellow weaver's broom (Spartium junceum) has often been regarded as the national flower in literature, specially in combination with red poppies. The "ruc català" (Catalan donkey) is a relatively recent creation, in order to produce something Catalan to oppose to the Osborne bull, widely perceived as a Spanish nationalist symbol. Iconic mountains like the Canigó, Montserrat and the striking double-peaked Pedraforca, are seen as local ancestral symbols.

=== Philosophy ===
Seny is a form of ancestral Catalan wisdom or sensibleness. It involves well-pondered perception of situations, level-headedness, awareness, integrity, and right action. Many Catalans consider seny something unique to their culture, as it is based on a set of ancestral local customs stemming from the scale of values and social norms of their society.

=== Sport ===
Sport has had a distinct importance in Catalan life and culture since the beginning of the 20th century; consequently, the region has a well-developed sports infrastructure. The main sports are football, basketball, handball, rink hockey, tennis and motorsport.

While the most popular sports are represented at international level by the Spanish national teams, Catalonia plays as itself in some minor ones, such as korfball, futsal or rugby league. Various Catalan Sports Federations have a long tradition and some of them participated in the foundation of international sports federations, as the Catalan Federation of Rugby, that was one of the founder members of the Fédération Internationale de Rugby Amateur (FIRA) in 1934. The majority of Catalan sport federations are part of the Sports Federation Union of Catalonia (Catalan: Unió de Federacions Esportives de Catalunya), founded in 1933. The presence of separate Catalan teams has caused disputes with Spanish sports institutions, as happened to roller hockey in the controversial Fresno Case (2004).

The Catalan Football Federation also periodically fields a national team against international opposition, organizing friendly matches. In recent years they have played with Bulgaria, Argentina, Brazil, Basque Country, Colombia, Nigeria, Cape Verde and Tunisia. The biggest football clubs are Barcelona (also known as Barça), who have won five European Cups (UEFA Champions League), and Espanyol, who have twice been runner-up of the UEFA Cup (now UEFA Europa League). As of December 2024, Barça, Espanyol and Girona FC play in the top Spanish League (La Liga).

The Catalan waterpolo is one of the main powers of the Iberian Peninsula. The Catalans won triumphs in waterpolo competitions at European and world level by club (the Barcelona was champion of Europe in 1981/82 and the Catalonia in 1994/95) and national team (one gold and one silver in Olympic Games and World Championships). It also has many international synchronised swimming champions.

Motorsport has a long tradition in Catalonia, involving many people, with some Catalonian world champions and several competitions organised since the beginning of the 20th century. The Circuit de Catalunya, built in 1991, is one of the main motorsport venues, holding the Catalan motorcycle Grand Prix, the Spanish F1 Grand Prix, a DTM race, and several other races.

Catalonia hosted many relevant international sport events, such as the 1992 Summer Olympics in Barcelona, as well as the 1955 Mediterranean Games, the 2013 World Aquatics Championships or the 2018 Mediterranean Games. It held annually the fourth-oldest still-existing cycling stage race in the world, the Volta a Catalunya (Tour of Catalonia).

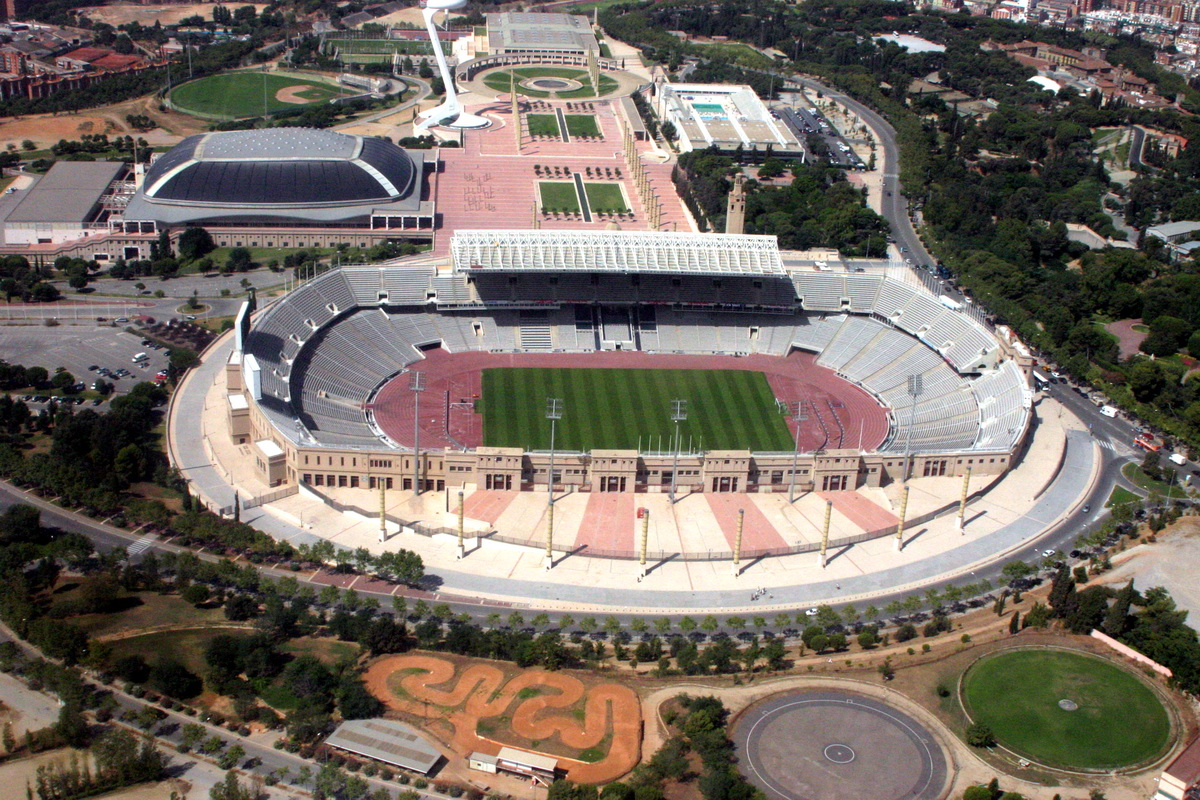
Olympic Park of Montjuïc, Barcelona. At the centre, the Olympic Stadium Lluís Companys

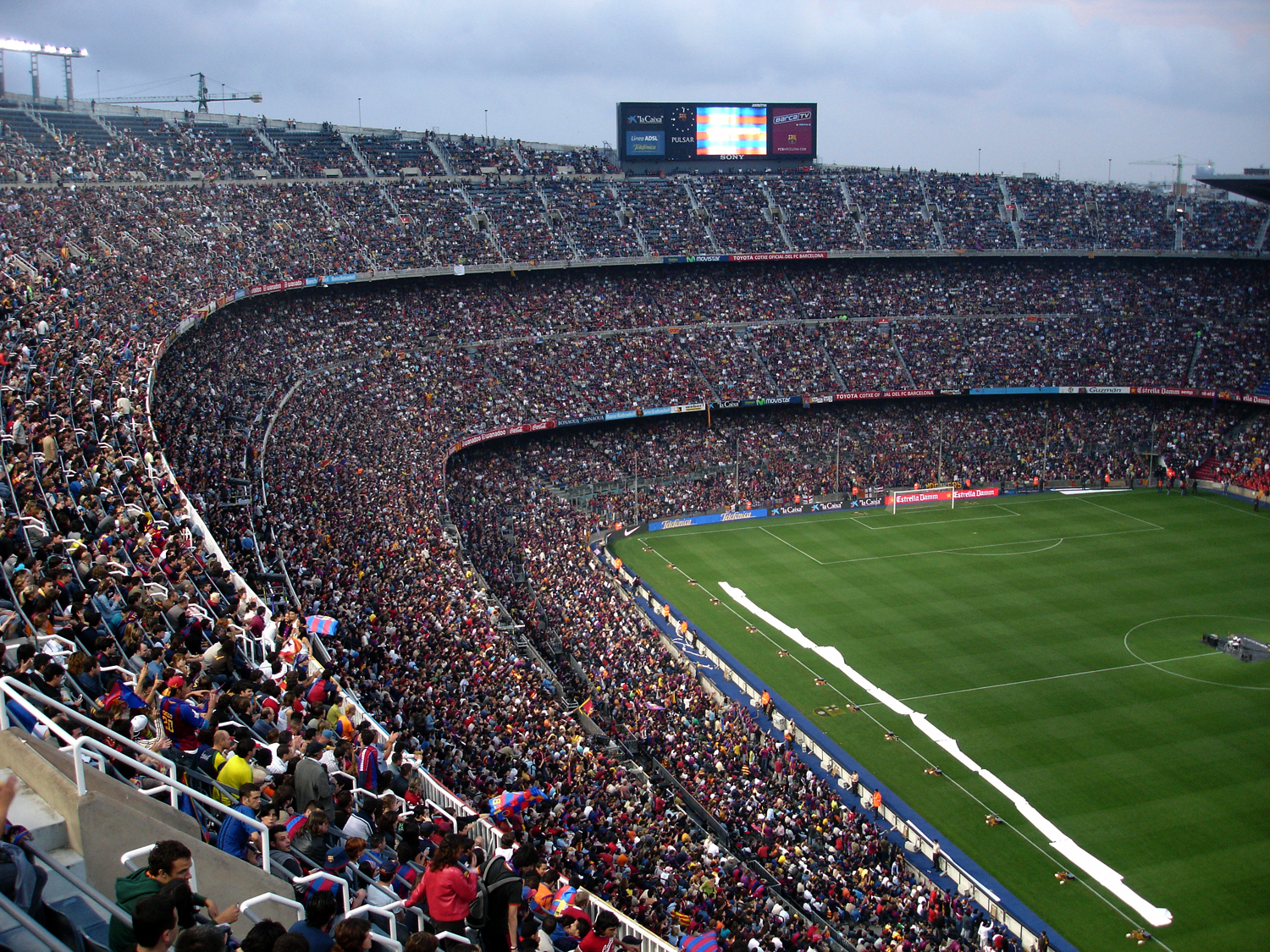
Camp Nou, home of FC Barcelona

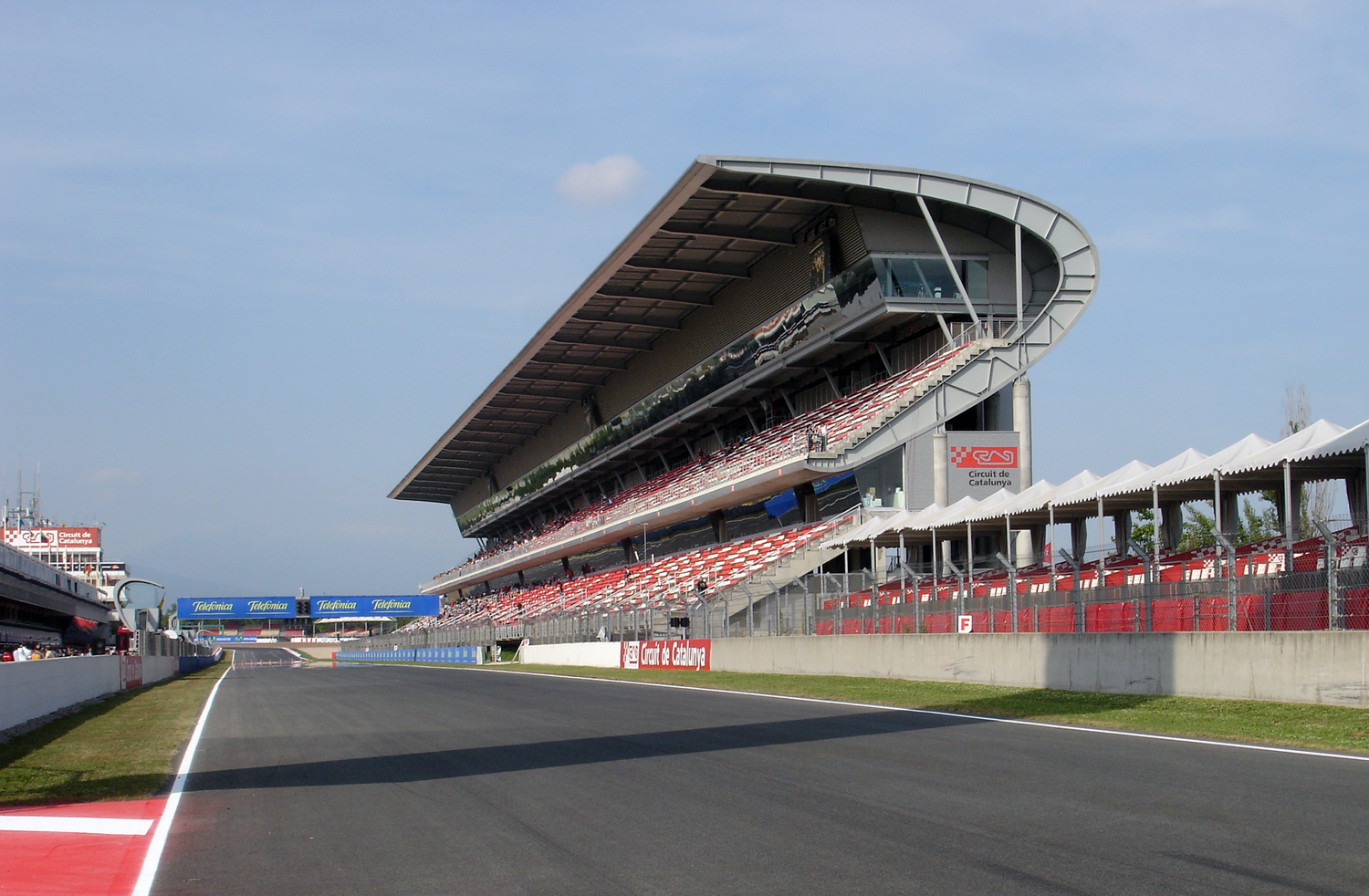
Circuit de Barcelona-Catalunya

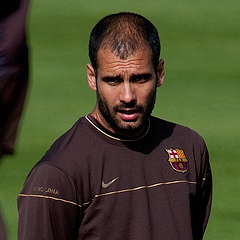
Pep Guardiola, one of the most successful football managers of all time, pictured while managing Barcelona

=== Cuisine ===
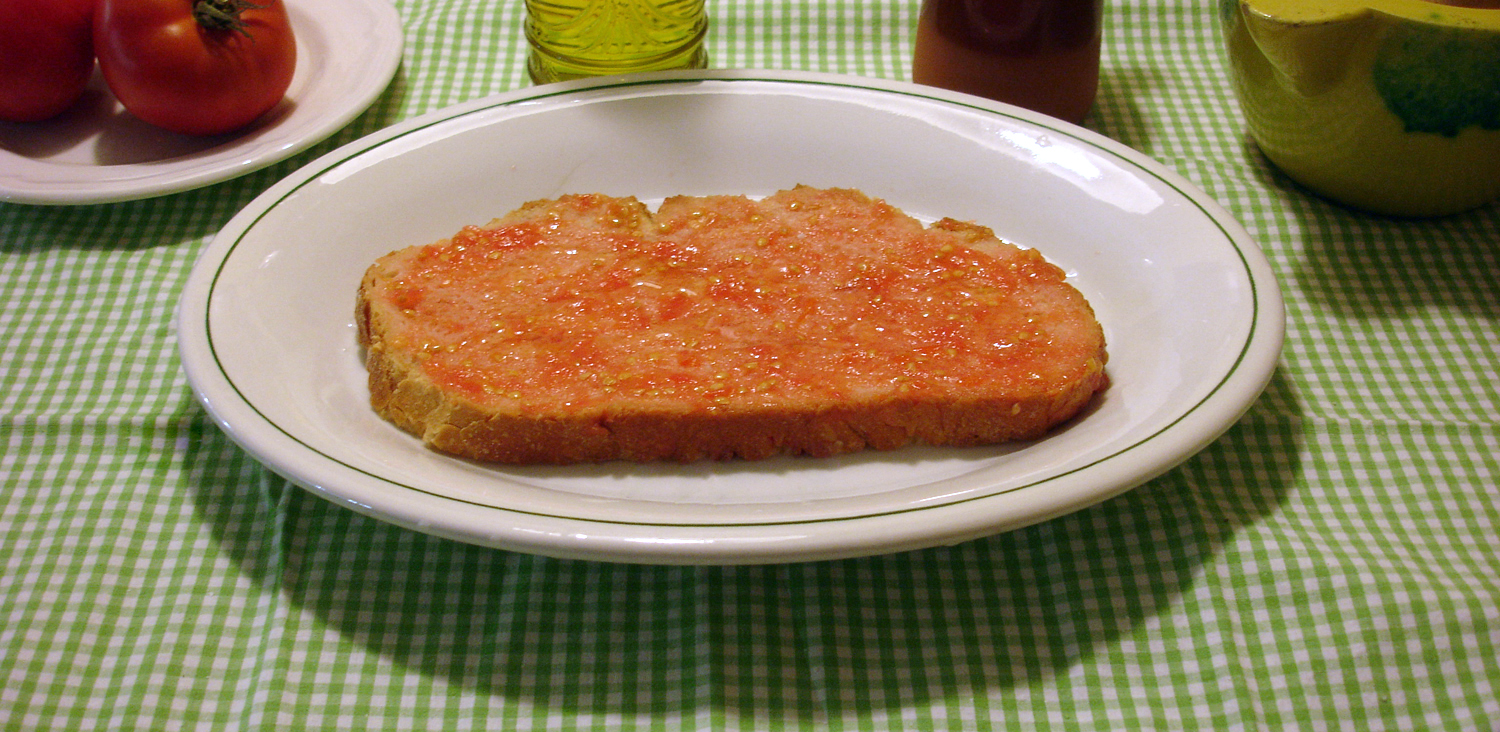
Pa amb tomàquet (bread with tomato)

Catalan gastronomy has a long culinary tradition. Various local food recipes have been described in documents dating from the fifteenth century. As with all the cuisines of the Mediterranean, Catalonian dishes make abundant use of fish, seafood, olive oil, bread and vegetables. Regional specialties include pa amb tomàquet (bread with tomato), which consists of bread (sometimes toasted), and tomato seasoned with olive oil and salt. Often the dish is accompanied with any number of sausages (cured botifarres, fuet, iberic ham, and others), ham or cheeses. Other dishes include calçotada, escudella i carn d'olla, suquet de peix (fish stew), and a dessert, Catalan cream.

Catalan vineyards also have several Denominacions d'Origen wines, such as Priorat, Montsant, Penedès and Empordà. There is also a sparkling wine, the cava.

Catalonia is internationally recognised for its fine dining. Three of the World's 50 Best Restaurants are in Catalonia, and four restaurants have three Michelin stars, including restaurants like El Bulli or El Celler de Can Roca, both of which regularly dominate international rankings of restaurants. The region has been awarded the European Region of Gastronomy title for the year 2016.

== Economy ==
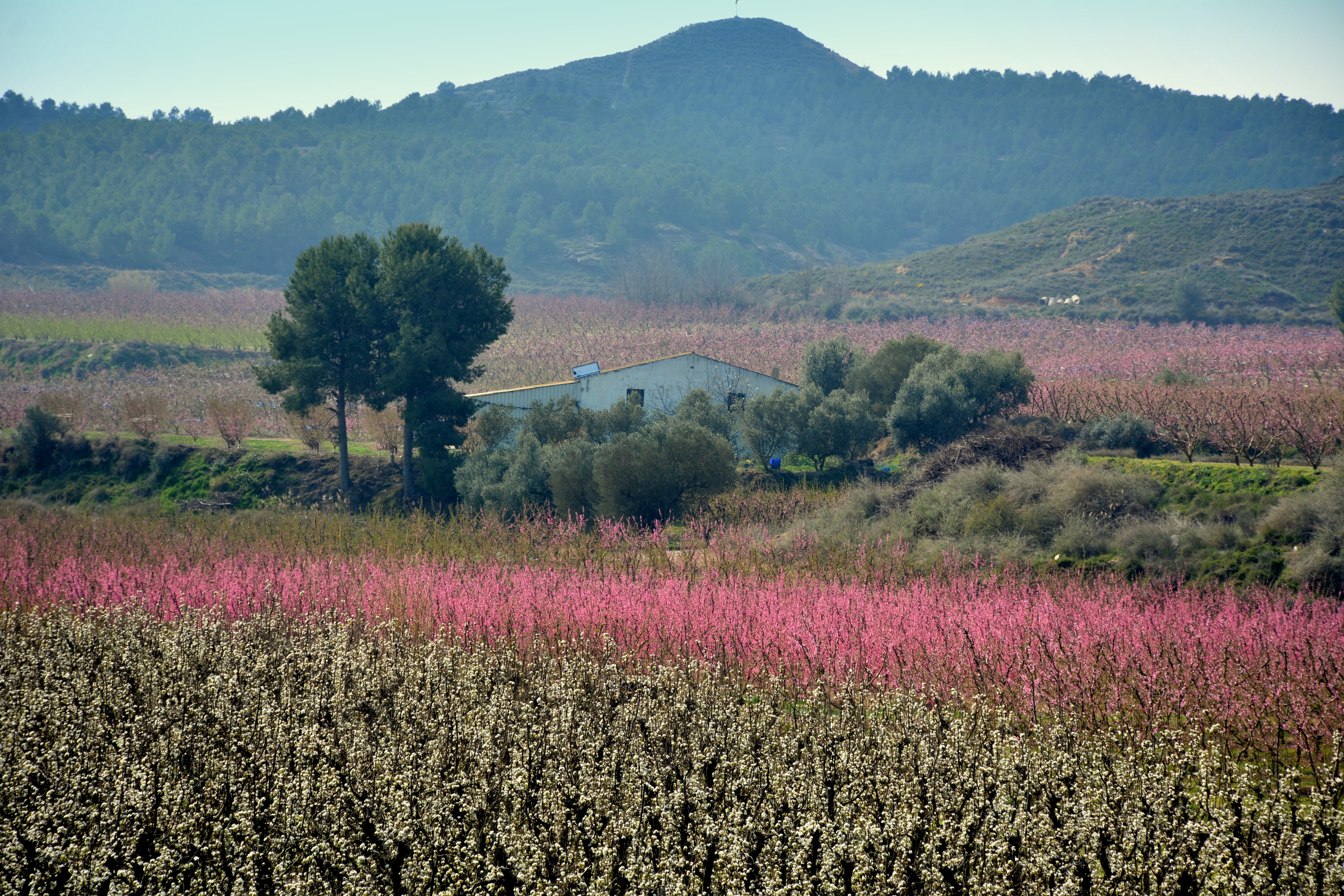
Peach fields in Aitona

Wines and caves with denomination of origin

Protected denominations of origin of olive oil

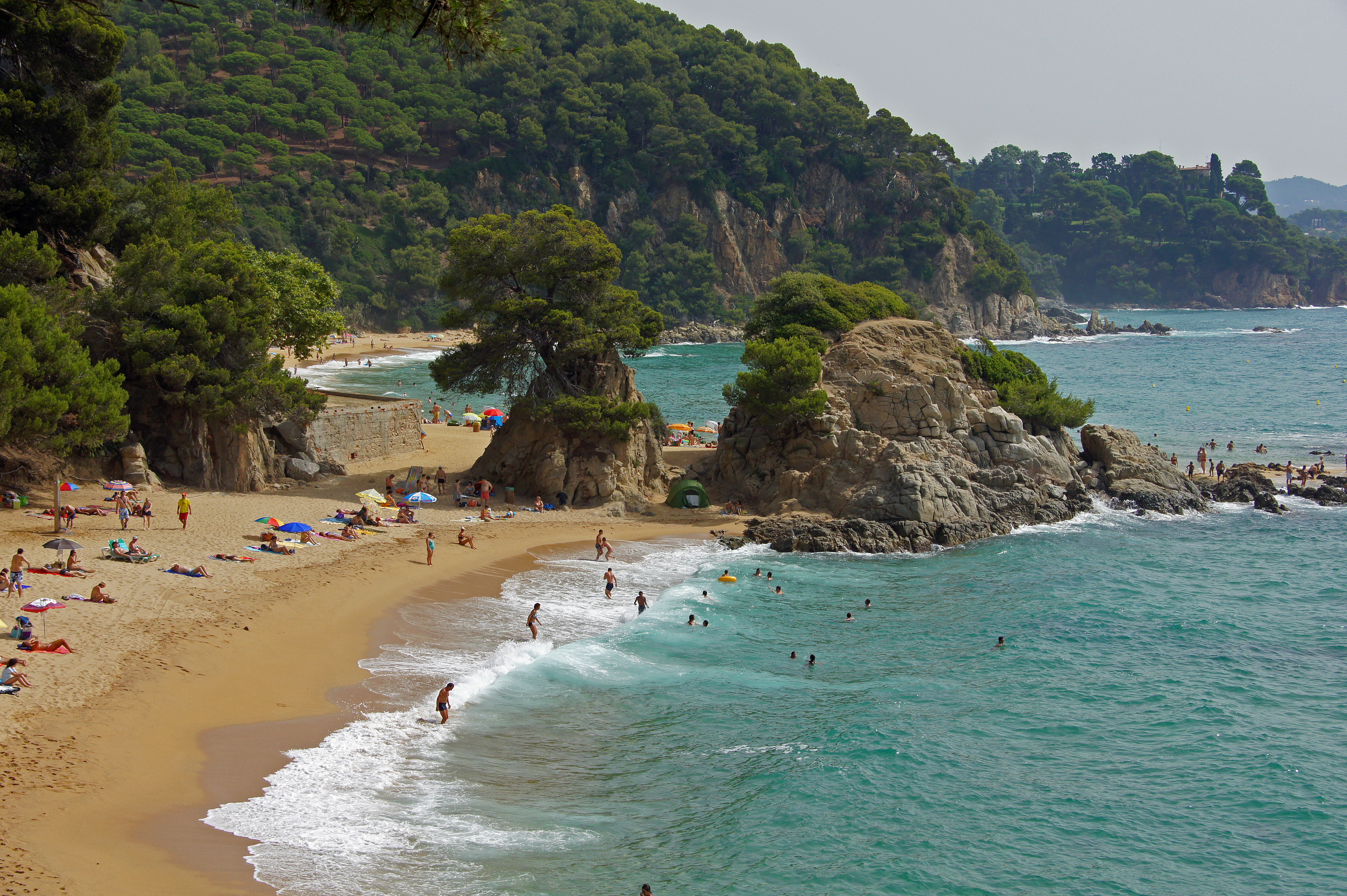
Costa Brava beach. Tourism plays an important role in the Catalan economy.

With a highly industrialised and populated region, the nominal GDP of Catalonia in 2024 was €302 billion, ranking second after Madrid (€316 billion) and with a per capita GDP of €37,477. The median income was €27,132 in 2024, ranking 4th among the rest of autonomous communities.

Catalonia's long-term credit rating is BB (Non-Investment Grade) according to Standard & Poor's, Ba2 (Non-Investment Grade) according to Moody's, and BBB- (Low Investment Grade) according to Fitch Ratings. Catalonia's rating is tied for worst with between 1 and 5 other autonomous communities of Spain, depending on the rating agency.

According to a 2020 study by Eu-Starts-Up, the Catalan capital is one of the European bases of "reference for start-ups" and the fifth city in the world to establish one of these companies, behind London, Berlin, Paris and Amsterdam. Barcelona is behind London, New York, Paris, Moscow, Tokyo, Dubai and Singapore and ahead of Los Angeles and Madrid.

In the context of the 2008 financial crisis, Catalonia was expected to suffer a recession amounting to almost a 2% contraction of its regional GDP in 2009. Catalonia's debt in 2012 was the highest of all Spain's autonomous communities, reaching €13,476 million, i.e. 38% of the total debt of the 17 autonomous communities, but in recent years its economy recovered a positive evolution and the GDP grew a 3.3% in 2015.

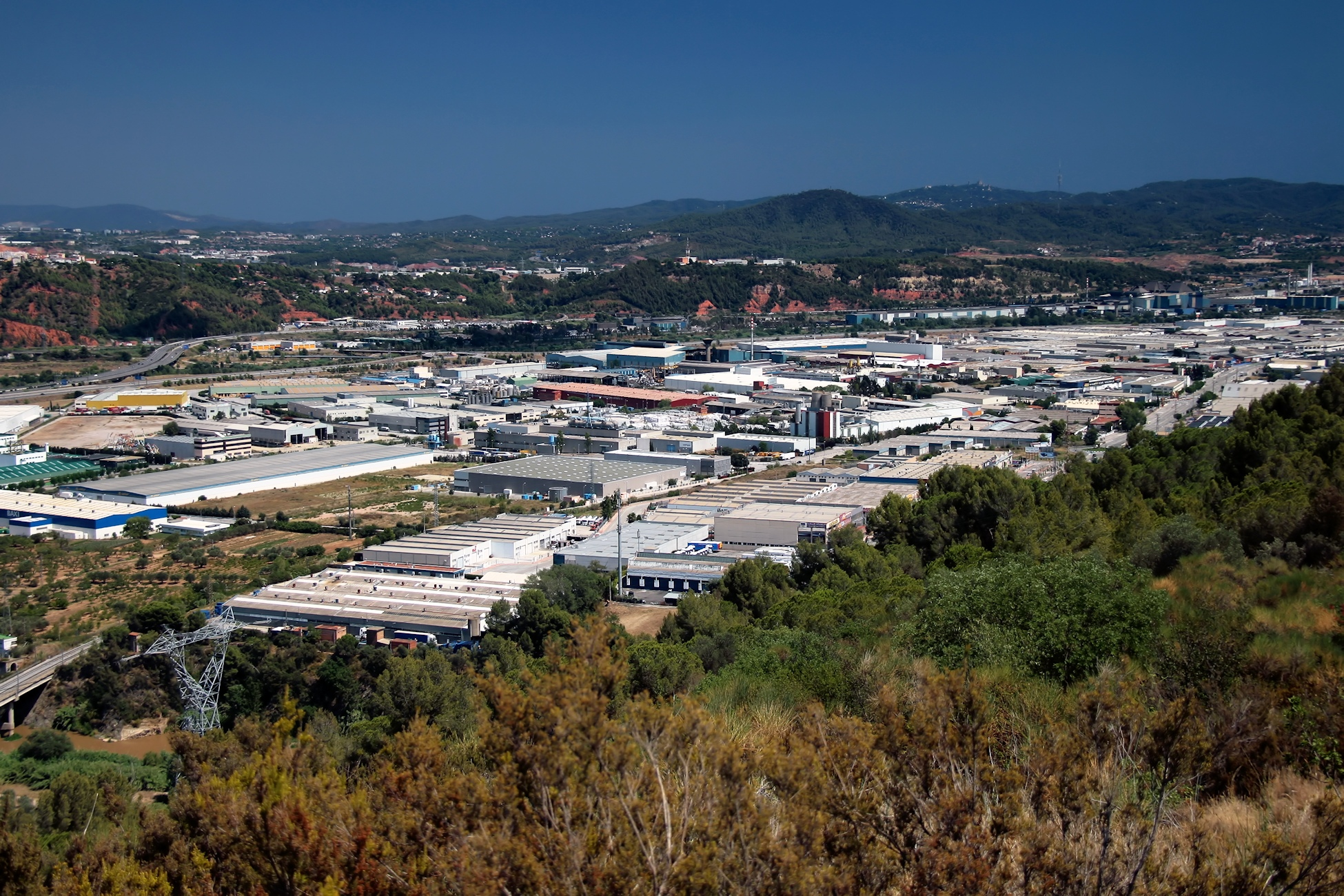
Industrial park in Castellbisbal

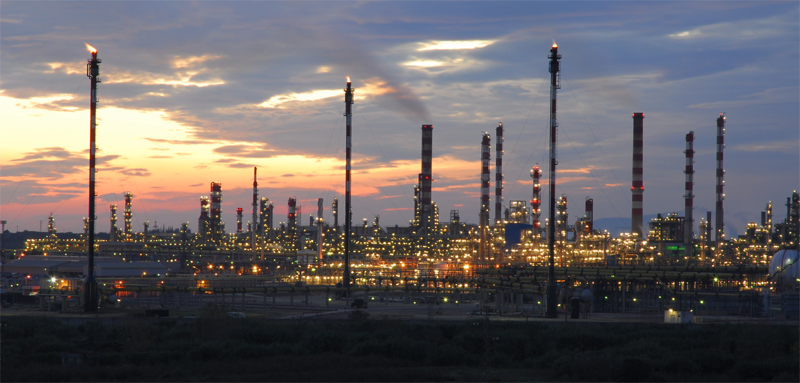
Factories, La Pobla de Mafumet, Tarragona

Catalonia is amongst the List of country subdivisions by GDP over 100 billion US dollars and is a member of the Four Motors for Europe organisation.

The distribution of sectors is as follows:

- Primary sector: 3%. The amount of land devoted to agricultural use is 33%.
- Secondary sector: 37% (compared to Spain's 29%)
- Tertiary sector: 60% (compared to Spain's 67%)

The main tourist destinations in Catalonia are the city of Barcelona, the beaches of the Costa Brava in Girona, the beaches of the Costa del Maresme and Costa del Garraf from Malgrat de Mar to Vilanova i la Geltrú and the Costa Daurada in Tarragona. In the High Pyrenees there are several ski resorts, near Lleida. On 1 November 2012, Catalonia started charging a tourist tax. The revenue is used to promote tourism, and to maintain and upgrade tourism-related infrastructure.

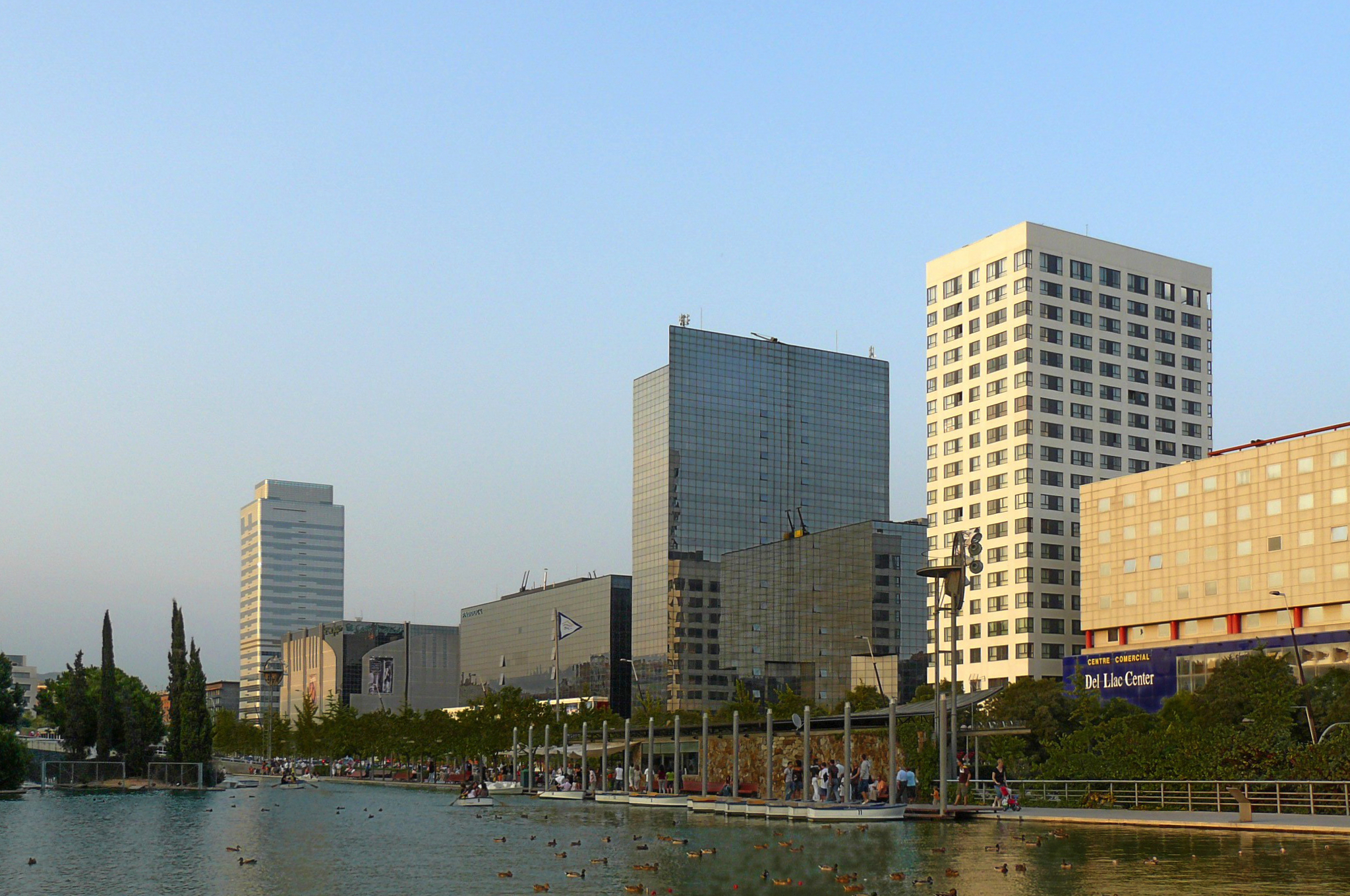
Eix Macià, Sabadell

Many of Spain's leading savings banks were based in Catalonia before the independence referendum of 2017. However, in the aftermath of the referendum, many of them moved their registered office to other parts of Spain. That includes the two biggest Catalan banks at that moment, La Caixa, which moved its office to Palma de Mallorca, and Banc Sabadell, ranked fourth among all Spanish private banks and which moved its office to Alicante. That happened after the Spanish government passed a law allowing companies to move their registered office without requiring the approval of the company's general meeting of shareholders. Overall, there was a negative net relocation rate of companies based in Catalonia moving to other autonomous communities of Spain. From the 2017 independence referendum until the end of 2018, for example, Catalonia lost 5454 companies to other parts of Spain (mainly Madrid), 2359 only in 2018, gaining 467 new ones from the rest of the country during 2018. It has been reported that the Spanish government and the Spanish King Felipe VI pressured some of the big Catalan companies to move their headquarters outside of the region.

The stock market of Barcelona, which in 2016 had a volume of around €152 billion, is the second largest of Spain after Madrid, and Fira de Barcelona organises international exhibitions and congresses to do with different sectors of the economy.

The main economic cost for Catalan families is the purchase of a home. According to data from the Society of Appraisal on 31 December 2005 Catalonia is, after Madrid, the second most expensive region in Spain for housing: 3,397 €/m^{2} on average (see Spanish property bubble).

=== Unemployment ===
The unemployment rate stood at 8.4% in 2025 and was lower than the national average.

Unemployment rate (Yearly data) (%)
2013	2014	2015	2016	2017	2018	2019	2020	2021	2022	2023	2024	2025
23.1%	20.3%	18.6%	15.7%	13.4%	11.5%	11.0%	12.6%	11.7%	10.0%	9.3%	8.9%	8.4%

== Transport ==
=== Airports ===
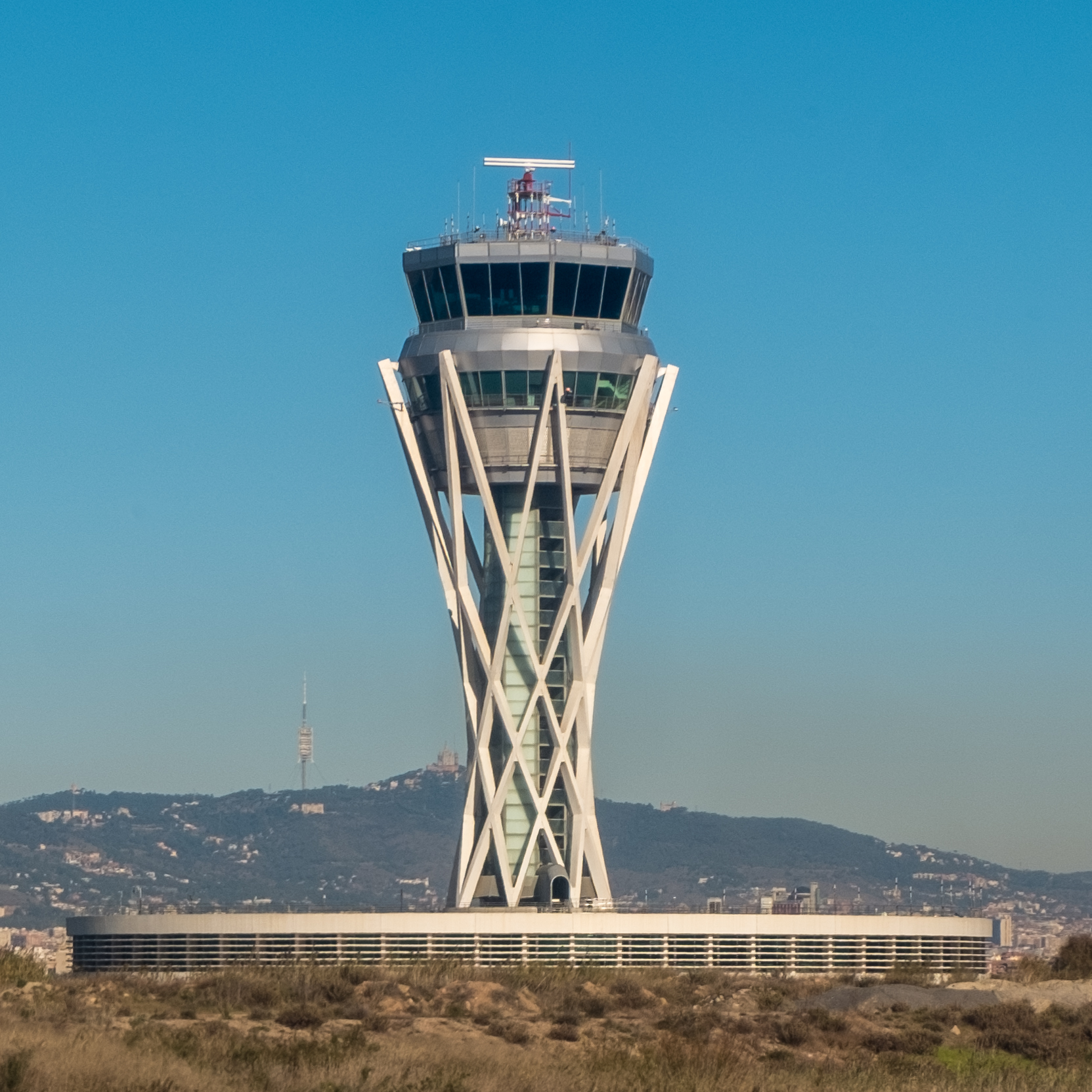
Barcelona Airport tower

Airports in Catalonia are owned and operated by Aena (a Spanish Government entity) except two airports in Lleida which are operated by Aeroports de Catalunya (an entity belonging to the Government of Catalonia).

- Barcelona El Prat Airport (Aena)
- Girona-Costa Brava Airport (Aena)
- Reus Airport (Aena)
- Lleida-Alguaire Airport (Aeroports de Catalunya)
- Sabadell Airport (Aena)
- La Seu d'Urgell Airport (Aeroports de Catalunya)

=== Ports ===
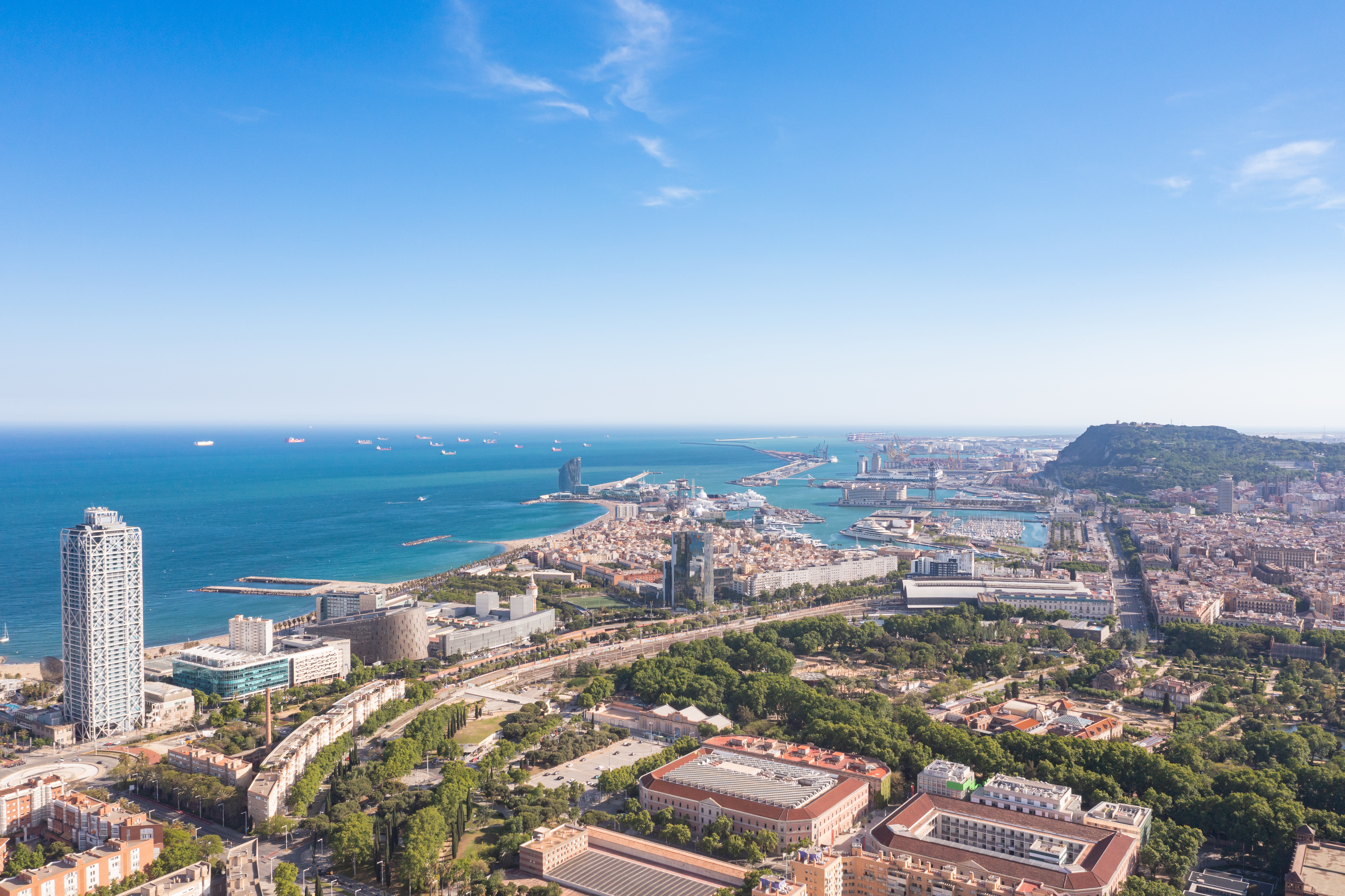
Aerial view of Zona Franca and the Port of Barcelona

Since the Middle Ages, Catalonia has been well integrated into international maritime networks. The port of Barcelona (owned and operated by Puertos del Estado, a Spanish Government entity) is an industrial, commercial and tourist port of worldwide importance. With 1,950,000 TEUs in 2015, it is the first container port in Catalonia, the third in Spain after Valencia and Algeciras in Andalusia, the 9th in the Mediterranean Sea, the 14th in Europe and the 68th in the world. It is the sixth largest cruise port in the world, and the largest in Europe and the Mediterranean with 2,364,292 passengers in 2014. The ports of Tarragona (owned and operated by Puertos del Estado) in the southwest and Palamós near Girona to the northeast are smaller. The port of Palamós and the other ports in Catalonia (26) are operated and administered by Ports de la Generalitat, a Catalan Government entity.

The development of these infrastructures, resulting from the topography and history of the Catalan territory, responds strongly to the administrative and political organisation of this autonomous community.

=== Roads ===
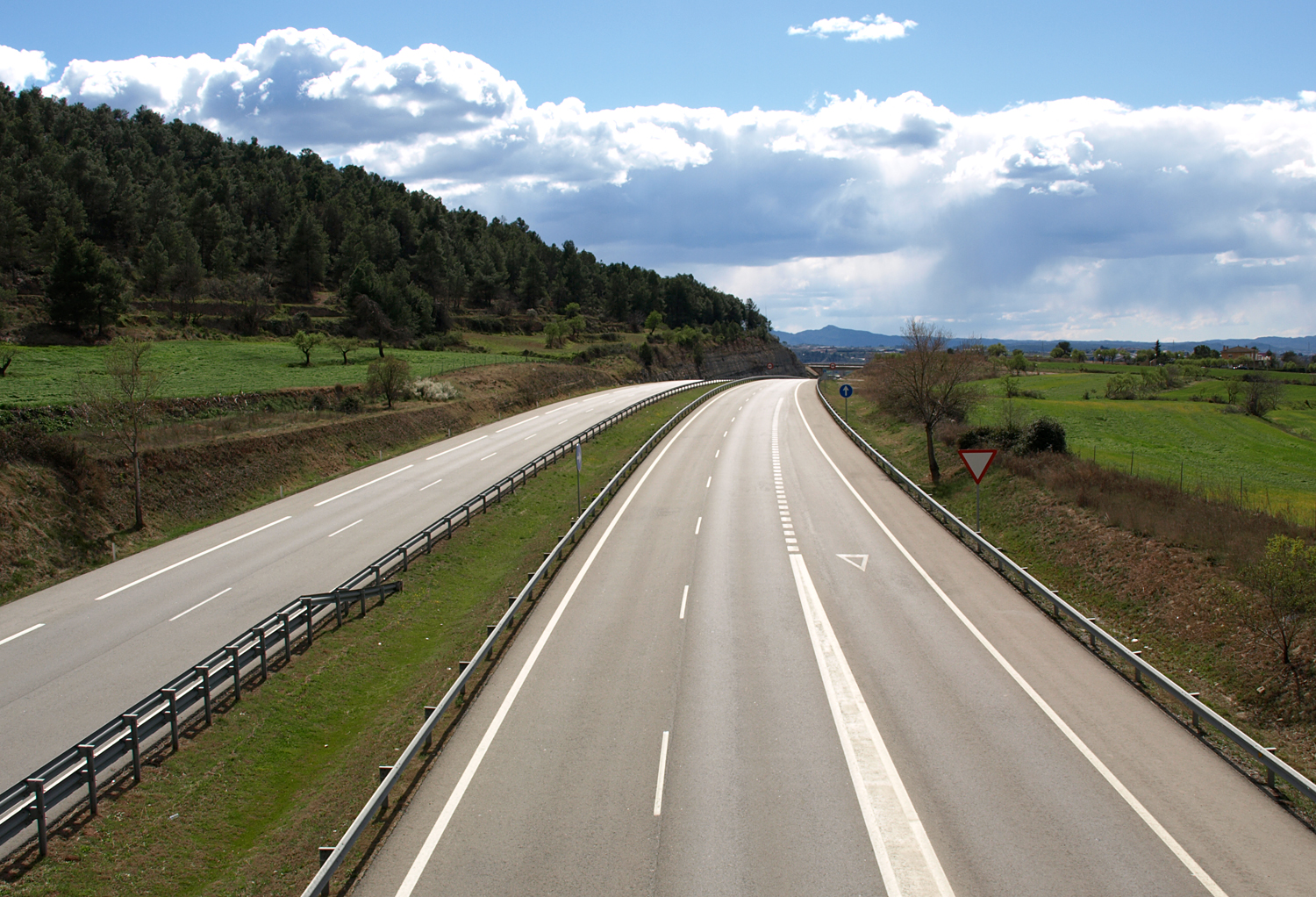
Autovia C-16 (Eix del Llobregat)

There are 12,000 kilometres (7,500 mi) of roads throughout Catalonia.

The principal highways are AP-7 (Autopista de la Mediterrània) and A-7 (Autovia de la Mediterrània). They follow the coast from the French border to Valencia, Murcia and Andalusia. The main roads generally radiate from Barcelona. The AP-2 (Autopista del Nord-est) and A-2 (Autovia del Nord-est) connect inland and onward to Madrid.

Other major roads are:

ID	Itinerary
N-II	Lleida-La Jonquera
C-12	Amposta-Àger
C-16	Barcelona-Puigcerdà
C-17	Barcelona-Ripoll
C-25	Cervera-Girona
A-26	Llançà-Olot
C-32	El Vendrell-Tordera
C-60	Argentona-La Roca del Vallès

Public-own roads in Catalonia are either managed by the autonomous government of Catalonia (e.g., C- roads) or the Spanish government (e.g., AP- , A- , N- roads).

=== Railways ===
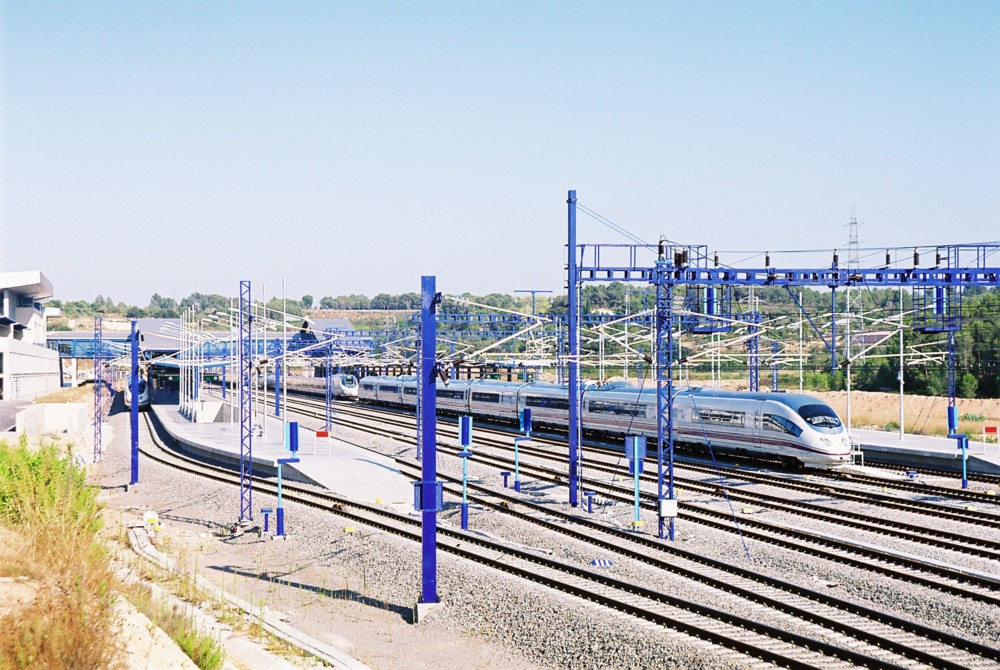
High-speed train (AVE) at Camp de Tarragona

Catalonia saw the first railway construction in the Iberian Peninsula in 1848, linking Barcelona with Mataró. Given the topography, most lines radiate from Barcelona. The city has both suburban and inter-city services. The main east coast line runs through the province connecting with the SNCF (French Railways) at Portbou on the coast.

There are two publicly owned railway companies operating in Catalonia: the Catalan FGC that operates commuter and regional services, and the Spanish national Renfe that operates long-distance and high-speed rail services (AVE and Avant) and the main commuter and regional service Rodalies de Catalunya, administered by the Catalan government since 2010.

High-speed rail (AVE) services from Madrid currently reach Barcelona, via Lleida and Tarragona. The official opening between Barcelona and Madrid took place 20 February 2008. The journey between Barcelona and Madrid now takes about two-and-a-half hours. A connection to the French high-speed TGV network has been completed (called the Perpignan–Barcelona high-speed rail line) and the Spanish AVE service began commercial services on the line 9 January 2013, later offering services to Marseille on their high speed network. This was shortly followed by the commencement of commercial service by the French TGV on 17 January 2013, leading to an average travel time on the Paris-Barcelona TGV route of 7h 42m. This new line passes through Girona and Figueres with a tunnel through the Pyrenees.

== International relations ==
=== Sister regions ===
- (Mexico) Nuevo León
- California
- Quebec

== See also ==
- Catalan Company
- Catalan Countries
- Date and time notation in Catalonia
- List of European regions by GDP
- List of people from Catalonia
- Northern Catalonia
- Outline of Catalonia
- History of political Catalanism
