= History of Catalan =

History of the Catalan language

The Catalan language originated from Vulgar Latin in the Pyrenees Mountains between France and Spain. It diverged from the other Romance languages in the 9th century. At that time, Catalan spread quickly throughout the Iberian peninsula when the Catalan counts conquered Muslim territory. By the 11th century, the Catalan language was present in several feudal documents. Catalan was present throughout the Mediterranean by the 15th century. At that time, the city of Valencia was thriving.

In 1659, the Treaty of Pyrenees was signed, beginning a suppression of the Catalan language. Louis XIV issued a decree that prohibited the use of the Catalan language in Northern Catalonia. The repression continued during the French Revolution when the French First Republic prohibited the usage of Catalan in linguistic education. The repression continued until recently, when finally the government body of the Pyrénées-Orientales in 2007 symbolically recognized the usage of Catalan publicly and its presence in education.

In Spain, Catalan was expelled from the official sphere, until it regained official status after the establishment of the Autonomous Region of Catalonia within the Second Spanish Republic (1931–1939). In Francoist Spain, Catalan was prohibited in government or education, accompaigned with a harsh repression and discouragement of the public use of the language during the first years of the Dictatorship. It was initially prohibited in mass media, but then tolerated during the 1950s, including the publishing of written works in Catalan. Since the death of Franco and the subsequent adoption of the Spanish constitutional monarchy, Catalan was restored as official language and since then has been promoted in different degrees by the autonomous governments of the Catalan-speaking areas (Catalonia, the Balearic Islands and Valencia). Today, despite the efforts to re-normalize the social use of the language (particularly in Catalonia) and their relative successes of the first decades, Catalan still faces issues of diglossia and increasing minorization, alongside the growth of discrimination cases.

== Middle Ages ==
=== Early Middle Ages ===
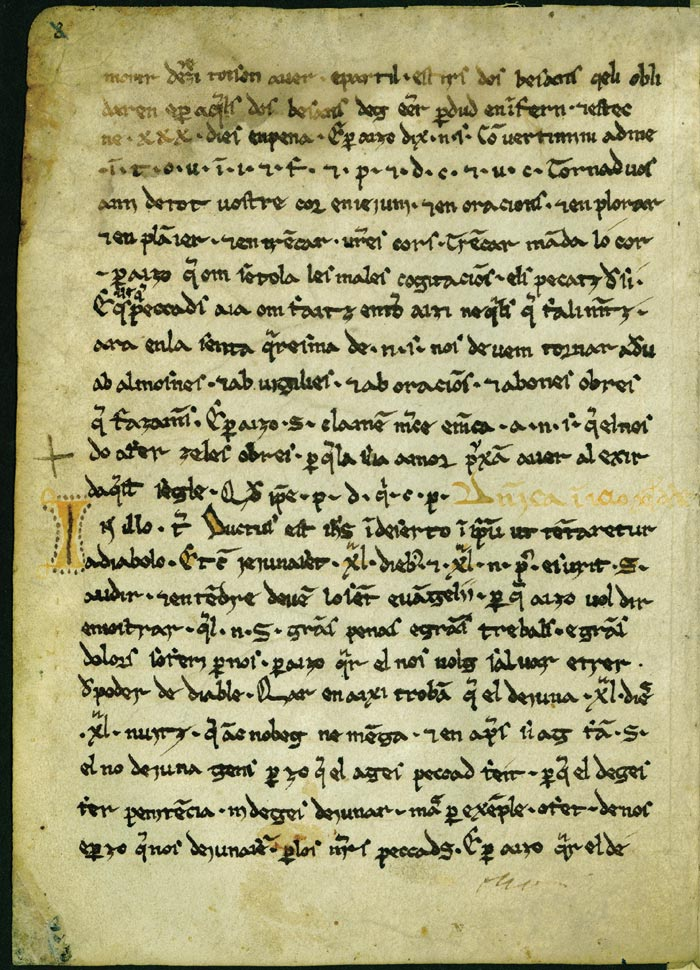
Les Homilies d'Organyà (12th century), first written in Catalan.

By the 9th century, the Catalan language had developed from Vulgar Latin on both sides of the eastern end of the Pyrenees mountains (counties of Rosselló, Empúries, Besalú, Cerdanya, Urgell, Pallars and Ribagorça), as well as in the territories of the Roman province and later archdiocese of Tarraconensis to the south. From the 8th century on, the Catalan counts extended their territory southwards and westwards, conquering territories then occupied by Muslims, bringing their language with them.

This expansion quickened with the separation of the County of Barcelona from the Carolingian Empire in 988. By the 9th century, the Christian rulers occupied the northern parts of present-day Catalonia, usually termed "Old Catalonia", and during the 11th and 12th centuries they expanded their domains to the region north of the Ebro river, a land known as "New Catalonia". During the 13th century, the Catalans expanded to the Land of Valencia and across to the Balearic Islands and Alghero in Sardinia.

Greuges of Guitard Isarn, Lord of Caboet (ca. 1080–1095)

Hec est memoria de ipsas rancuras que abet dominus Guitardus Isarnus, senior Caputense, de rancuras filio Guillelm Arnall et que ag de suo pater, Guilelm Arnall; et non voluit facere directum in sua vita de ipso castro Caputense che li comannà. Et si Guilelm Arnal me facia tal cosa que dreçar no·m volgués ho no poqués, ho ssi·s partia de mi, che Mir Arnall me romasés aisí com lo·m avia al dia che ad él lo commanné. Et in ipsa onor a Guillelm Arnal no li doné negú domenge ni establiment de cavaler ni de pedó per gitar ni per metre quan l·i comanné Mir Arnall.

— Lines 1–4. Passages in Catalan in italics

According to historian Jaume Villanueva (1756–1824), the first attested Catalan sentence is thought to be found in an 8th-century manuscript from Ripoll that has since been lost. It was a whimsical note in 10th- or early 11th-century calligraphy: Magister m[eu]s no vol que em miras novel ("my master does not want you to watch me, newbie").

Starting in the 9th century, several feudal documents (especially oaths and complaints) written in macaronic Latin began to exhibit elements of Catalan, with proper names or even sentences in Romance. For example, in the act of consecration of the cathedral of Urgell from 839 the toponymy exhibits clear Catalan traits, like apocope in Argilers < ARGILARĬUS, Llinars < LINĀRES, Kabrils < CAPRĪLES, and reduction of Latin clusters as in Palomera < PALUMBARĬA. Another text, from the early 11th century, exhibits the names of seven fruit trees:

morers III et oliver I et noguer I et pomer I et amendolers IIII et pruners et figuers...

Of special historical and linguistic importance is the Memorial of Complaints of Ponç I (ca. 1050–1060), featuring whole sentences in Romance. By the middle of the 11th century, documents written completely or mostly in Catalan begin to appear, like the Oath of Radulf Oriol (ca. 1028–1047), Complaints of Guitard Isarn, Lord of Caboet (ca. 1080–1095), and The Oath of Peace and Truce of Count Pere Ramon (1098). The hagiographic poem Cançó de Santa Fe from ca. 1054 is not considered one of the oldest Catalan texts because it is hard to tell if it is written in Catalan or Occitan, since its place of composition is unknown and it is difficult to assign it to one language or the other: the two languages were similar to each other at the time. A whose deed of sale wrote by Alba Guibert in 1044 is reported to be the first legal document written by a woman in Catalonia, containing earliest examples of a Catalan language.

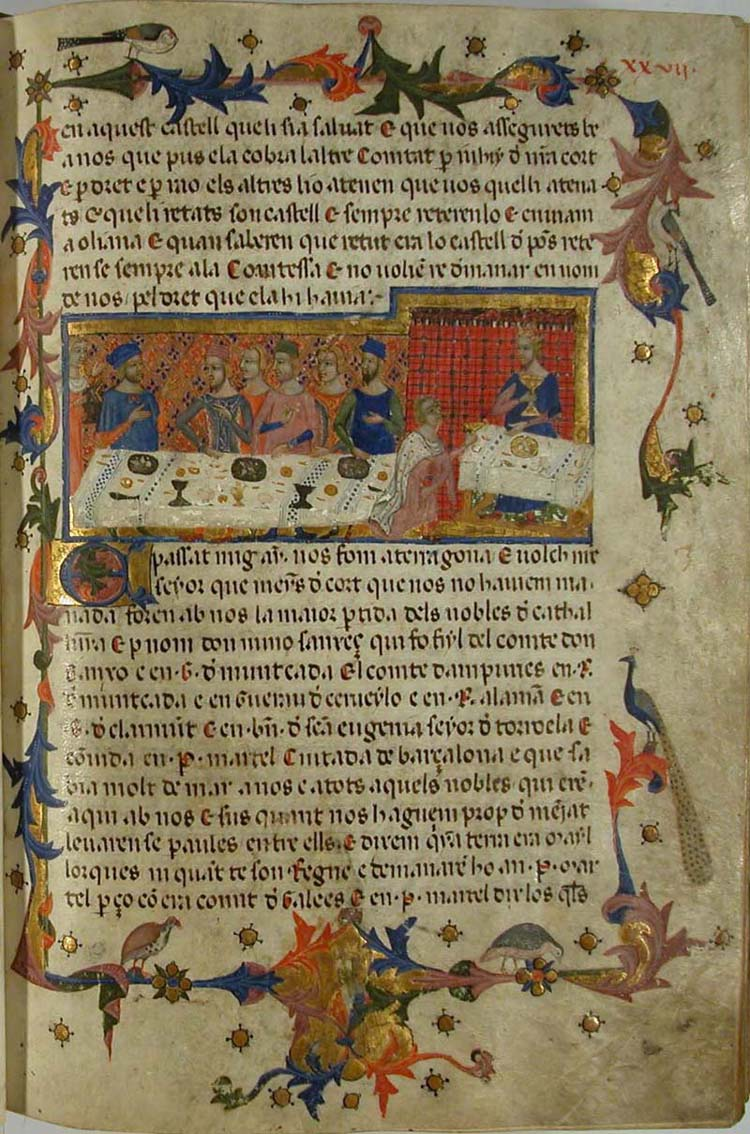
Fragment of the oldest existing copy of the Llibre dels Fets written in the original Catalan, dating from 1343. The scene depicts James I of Aragon with his lords planned the conquest of Majorca (1229)

Catalan shares many features with Gallo-Romance languages, which are mostly located in France and Northern Italy. Old Catalan diverged from Old Occitan between the 11th and 14th centuries, although it was not until the 19th century that Catalan was formally considered a separate language by romanists, when in 1863 the German philologist Friedrich Christian Diez first put Catalan on the same level as the rest of the Romance languages, though still admitting a close relationship with Occitan.

=== Late Middle Ages ===
Catalan enjoyed a golden age during the Late Middle Ages, reaching a peak of maturity and cultural plenitude. Examples of this can be seen in the works of Majorcan polymath Ramon Llull (1232–1315), the Four Great Chronicles (13th-14th centuries), and the Valencian school of poetry which culminated in Ausiàs March (1397–1459).

By the 15th century, the city of Valencia had become the center of social and cultural dynamism, and Catalan was present all over the Mediterranean world. The belief that political splendor was correlated with linguistic consolidation was voiced through the Royal Chancery, which promoted a highly standardized language.

The outstanding novel of chivalry Tirant lo Blanc (1490), by Joanot Martorell, shows the transition from medieval to Renaissance values, something that can also be seen in the works of Bernat Metge and Andreu Febrer. During this period, Catalan was what Costa Carreras terms "one of the 'great languages' of medieval Europe". The flowering of the Renaissance was closely associated with the advent of the printing press, and the first book produced with movable type in the Iberian Peninsula was printed in Valencia in 1474: Trobes en llaors de la Verge maria ("Poems of praise of the Virgin Mary").

== 18th century to the present: France ==
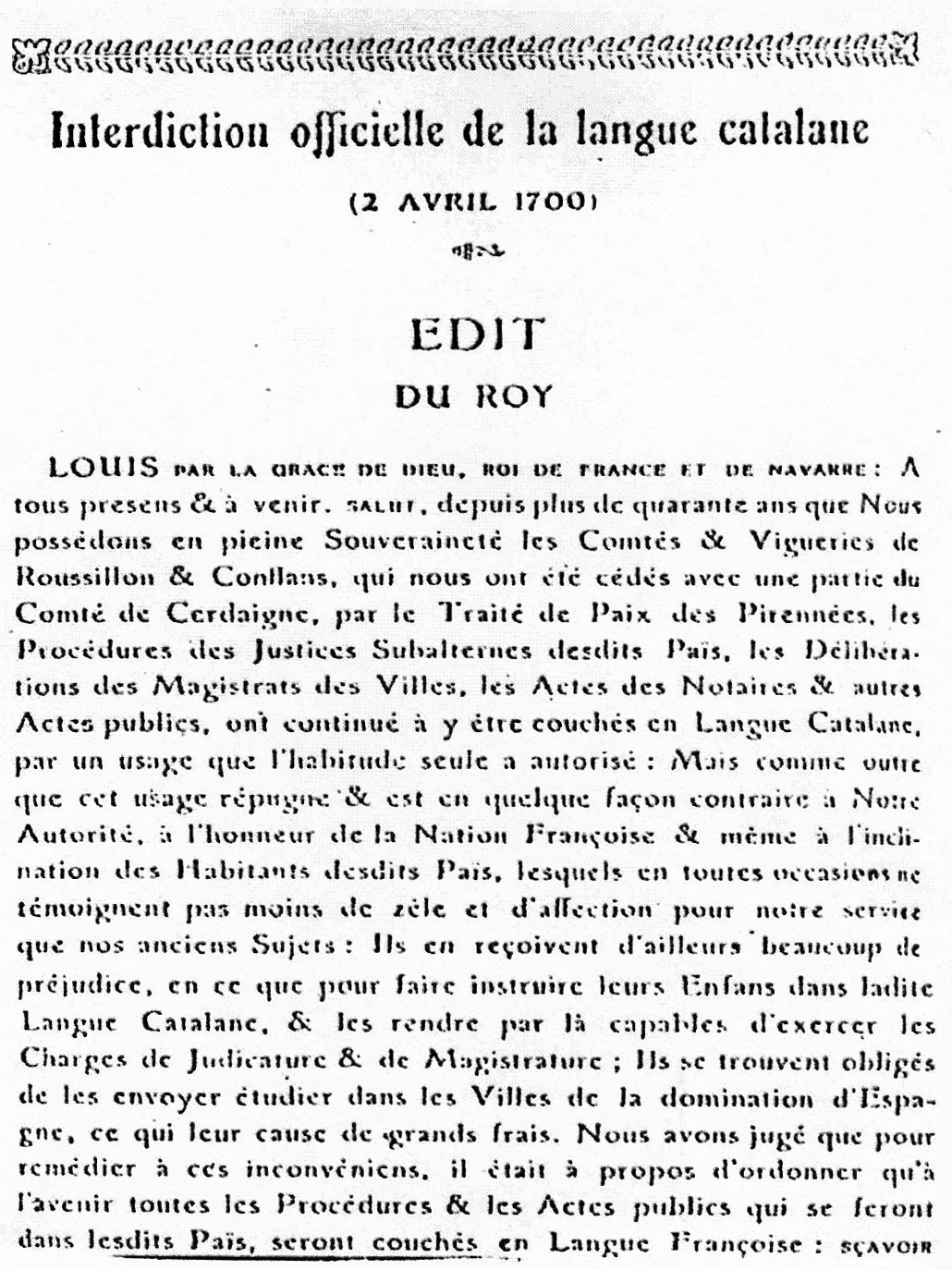
Official Decree Prohibiting the Catalan Language in France.

After the Treaty of the Pyrenees, a royal decree by Louis XIV of France on 2 April 1700 prohibited the use of the Catalan language in present-day Northern Catalonia. The decree forbade use in any official document, under the threat of being invalidated.

Shortly after the French Revolution, the French First Republic prohibited official use of, and enacted discriminating policies against, the nonstandard languages of France (patois), such as Catalan, Breton, Occitan, Flemish, and Basque.

The deliberate process of eradicating non-French vernaculars in modern France and dismissing them as mere local and often strictly oral dialects was formalized with Abbé Grégoire's Report on the necessity and means to annihilate the patois and to universalize the use of the French language, which he presented on June 4, 1794, to the National Convention; thereafter, all languages other than French were officially banned in the administration and schools for the sake of linguistically uniting post-Bastille Day France.

To date, the French government continues its policy of recognising French as the country's only official language. Nevertheless, on 10 December 2007, the General Council of the Pyrénées-Orientales recognised Catalan as one of its official languages in Article 1 (a) of its Charte en faveur du Catalan and sought to promote it in public life and education.

Article 1: "The General Council of Pyrénées-Orientales officially recognizes, along with the French language, Catalan as a language of the department."
("Le Conseil Général des Pyrénées-Orientales reconnaît officiellement, au côté de la langue française, le catalan comme langue du département)."

== 18th century to the present: Spain ==
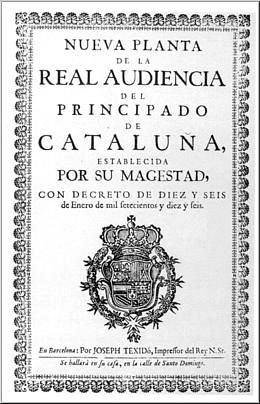
The Nueva Planta Decrees

After the Nueva Planta Decrees, the use of Catalan in administration and education was banned in the Kingdom of Spain. The administrative use of the Catalan language was replaced with Spanish. While theoretically the replacement solely affected the Royal Audience, the king provided with secret instructions to the royal officers in Catalan territory: they "will take the utmost care to introduce the Castilian [Spanish] language, for which purpose he will give the most temperate and disguised measures so that the effect is achieved, without the care being noticed."

The effects were initially limited on society, upon the official survey the Statistics Office of the French Ministry of the Interior asked the prefects, in 1807, regarding the limits of the French language. The survey found that in Roussillon, almost only Catalan was spoken, and since Napoleon wanted to incorporate Catalonia into France, as happened in 1812, the consul in Barcelona was also asked. He declared that Catalan "is taught in schools, it is printed and spoken, not only among the lower class, but also among people of first quality, also in social gatherings, as in visits and congresses", indicating that it was spoken everywhere "with the exception of the royal courts". He also indicated that Catalan was spoken "in the Kingdom of Valencia, in the islands of Mallorca, Menorca, Ibiza, Sardinia, Corsica and much of Sicily, in the Vall d'Aran and Cerdanya".

During the Renaixença that use of the Catalan language also saw an increase in usage. During the Second Spanish Republic (1931–1939) Catalan became the official language of Catalonia (alongside Spanish), being used extensively by the Generalitat, the Catalan institution of self-government.

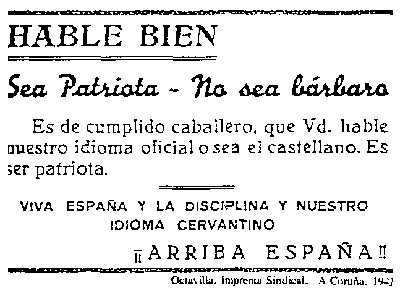
Leaflet of the Francoist Spanish Syndical Organization from 1942 advocating against the use of the other languages spoken in Spain apart from Spanish. It says, in Spanish: "Speak well. Be patriotic - Don't be barbaric. It is expected from a respectable gentleman to speak our official language, that is to say, Spanish. It is to be a patriot. Long live Spain, and discipline, and our Cervantine language."

In Francoist Spain (1939–1975), the use of Spanish in place of Catalan was promoted, and public use of Catalan was initially repressed and discouraged by official propaganda campaigns. The use of Catalan in government-run institutions and in public events was banned. During later stages of Francoist Spain, certain folkloric or religious celebrations in Catalan were allowed to resume and were tolerated. Use of Catalan in the mass media was initially forbidden, but beginning in the early 1950s, it was permitted in the theater. Publishing in Catalan continued throughout the Spanish State. There were attempts at prohibiting the use of spoken Catalan in public and in commerce, and all advertising and signage had to be in Spanish, as did all written communication in business.

Following the death of Franco in 1975 and the restoration of democracy under a constitutional monarchy, the use of Catalan increased significantly because of new affirmative action and subsidy policies. The Catalan language recovered its official status and is now used in politics, education and the media, including the newspapers Avui ("Today"), El Punt ("The Point"), Ara ("Now"), La Vanguardia and El Periódico de Catalunya (sharing content with El Periòdic d'Andorra, printed in Andorra); and the television channels of Televisió de Catalunya (TVC): TV3, and Canal 33 (culture channel), Super3/3XL (cartoons channel) as well as a 24-hour news channel 3/24 and the sports channel Esport 3; in Valencia Canal Nou, 24/9 and Punt 2; in the Balearic islands IB3; in Catalonia there are also some private channels such as 8TV and Barça TV.

But, despite the spread of media in Catalan, democracy consolidated an asymmetric regime of bilingualism of sorts, wherein the Spanish government has employed a system of laws that favored Spanish over Catalan, which becomes the weaker of the two languages, and therefore, in the absence of other states where it is spoken, is doomed to extinction in the medium or short term. In the same vein, before 2023, its use in the Spanish Congress was prevented, and it is prevented from achieving official status in Europe, unlike less spoken languages such as Gaelic. In other institutional areas, such as justice, Plataforma per la Llengua has denounced Catalanophobia. The association Soberania i Justícia have also denounced it in an act in the European Parliament. It also takes the form of linguistic secessionism, originally advocated by the Spanish extreme right and which has finally been adopted by the Spanish government itself and state bodies.

== See also ==
- History of political Catalanism

== Bibliography ==
- Costa Carreras, Joan; Yates, Alan (2009). The Architect of Modern Catalan: Selected Writings/Pompeu Fabra (1868–1948). Instutut d'Estudis Catalans & Universitat Pompeu Fabra & Jonh Benjamins B.V. pp. 6–7. ISBN 978-90-272-3264-9.
- Grau Mateu, Josep (2015). "El català, llengua de govern: la política lingüística de la Mancomunitat de Catalunya (1914-1924)". Revista de Llengua i Dret (64). Revista de llengua i dret, 64: 86–101.
- Moran, Josep (1994). Treballs de lingüística històrica catalana (in Catalan). Barcelona: Publicacions de l'Abadia de Monsterrat. pp. 55–93. ISBN 84-7826-568-6.
- Moran, Josep (2004). Estudis d'història de la llengua catalana (in Catalan). Barcelona: Publicacions de l'Abadia de Montserrat. pp. 37–38. ISBN 84-8415-672-9.
- Riquer, Martí de (1964). "Vol.1". Història de la Literatura Catalana (in Catalan). Barcelona: Ariel.
- Veny, Joan (1997). "greuges de Guitard isarn, Senyor de Caboet (1080-1095)". Homenatge a Arthur Terry. Barcelona: Publicacions de l'Abadia de Montserrat. pp. 9–18. ISBN 84-7826-894-4.
