= Enric Canals =

Spanish journalist (1952–2025)

- Enric Canals i Cussó
- Born: 1952; Tiana, Province of Barcelona, Spain
- Died: 18 October 2025 (aged 72–73)
- Occupations: Journalist, screenwriter, television producer
- Known for: Founding team of Televisió de Catalunya; second director of TV3 (1984 to 1989)

Enric Canals i Cussó was a Spanish journalist, screenwriter and television producer who was part of the founding team of Televisió de Catalunya and served as the second director of TV3 from 1984 to 1989. He worked for El País and Diari de Barcelona and collaborated with Ràdio Barcelona before moving into documentary production and senior public communication roles in Catalonia. In 2011, he was appointed delegate of Vocento in Catalonia and in 2013 he received the Godó Prize for Investigative Journalism and Reporting for his essay Pujol Catalunya. El consell de guerra a Jordi Pujol. He died on 18 October 2025 aged 73.

== Early life and education ==
Canals was born in Tiana in the Province of Barcelona in 1952. He held a degree in Information Sciences, as reported by Catalan outlets at the time of his death. In his early professional years, he wrote and edited for El País and the Diari de Barcelona and also worked with Ràdio Barcelona. In August 1986, as a representative of Televisió de Catalunya, he signed a cooperation agreement with independent producers that became an early milestone in relations between the public broadcaster and Catalonia’s audiovisual sector.

== Career ==
Canals joined Televisió de Catalunya at its inception, first as head of programmes and later as director of TV3 from 1984 to 1989. During his tenure, the channel inaugurated its current headquarters in Sant Joan Despí in 1986, launched Canal 33 in 1988, opened delegations in Girona, Lleida and Tarragona, created the regional newscast Telenotícies Comarques and broadcast in Aranese for the first time in the Val d'Aran. He subsequently directed the Barcelona daily El Observador while continuing collaborations in press and radio.

In 1990, he founded the production company Mercuri SGP, from which he produced and developed documentary series often centred on twentieth-century history, including Te’n recordes, Els dies que van canviar la nostra vida and Un món en flames. He also directed the TV3 Sense ficció documentary Pujol/Catalunya. El consell de guerra in 2013, which reconstructed the 1960 court-martial of Jordi Pujol and achieved record viewership for the strand. The same project corresponded to his Godó Prize for reporting for the essay Pujol Catalunya. El consell de guerra a Jordi Pujol.

Beyond television production, he held senior public communication posts, serving as director general of Diffusion in the Generalitat de Catalunya from 1997 to 2001, as a member of the Catalan Audiovisual Council and as a member of the board of the Corporació Catalana de Mitjans Audiovisuals between 2004 and 2008. His appointment to the CCRTV board was formalised at the Parliament of Catalonia on 24 February 2004.

In March 2011, he was appointed delegate of the Vocento group in Catalonia, a role he combined with his documentary production activities. He continued as a documentary director in this period, including the film Jesús Monzón, el líder olvidado por la historia, selected in 2011 and later broadcast by RTVE.

In later years, he advised the Government of Andorra on the creation of RTVA and resided in the Principality, with Andorran outlets noting his contribution and subsequent residence.
