= MiqueletsTV =

Catalan-language Twitch channel

Twitch information
- Channel: MiqueletsTVnet
- Years active: 2020-present
- Genres: Dubbed anime, manga and animation series & films for children and youth
- Followers: 3.2k
- Last updated: 13 October 2025

MiqueletsTV (also known as AlmogaversTV) is a children's and youth livestreaming channel in Catalan, which broadcasts as a user through the US-based platform Twitch. It is run by an anonymous team and was created in September 2020 as a claim for the lack of public access to multimedia content in Catalan language. Its aim is the linguistic normalization of this language in the entertainment of the youth and the families with kids.

== Audiences and Content ==
The streaming channel was named after the Miquelets, the Catalan militias active in the 17th century that fought against the Castilian invasion of Philip IV of Spain during the Reapers' War. MiqueletsTV has an average audience of 200 unique viewers per day—a figure that increases significantly on weekends. Its target audience comprises the age range between the 20 and 35 years old, but also many families given the animated, fiction, anime and manga TV-series and movies dubbed into Catalan that it broadcasts and which are not easily available in the market.

Some of the series that have been broadcast by MiqueletsTV are Dr. Slump, Bobobo-bo Bo-bobo, Death Note, One Piece, Inuyasha, The Adventures of Tintin, Potatoes and Dragons, Sailor Moon, Crayon Shin-chan, and Skins, as well as films series such as Harry Potter. The channel's management team has several contributors who provide them with digital copies of the former TV emissions in the Catalan-speaking channels Super3, 3XL or Canal 9.

== Intellectual property disputes ==
MiqueletsTV has been repeatedly blocked in Twitch due to the distribution of material without the consent of the copyright owners. When the main channel was blocked, the channel also broadcast as AlmogaversTV. The users that manage the account have made public that they aware of the infringement of intellectual property and the digital piracy behavior of the channel.

Despite the bans, its team vindicates its existence and recidivism as justified. MiqueletsTV argues that its function obeys to "social and linguistic urgent needs" in the face of the loss of online entertainment in Catalan, as well as to alleviate the struggles of many families in offering quality TV products in their own (minorized) language to their children. It considers the emergence of such streaming options to be the only self-managed alternative capable of reaching the general public in a context of progressive losses of investment, renewal and quality of historic children's channels from the Corporació Catalana de Mitjans Audiovisuals (CCMA) and other Catalan-speaking audiovisual consortiums with the mission to preserve the language, especially Super3 and 3XL (the latter extinct since 2012).

The appearance of MiqueletsTV contributed to boost the public debate about the digital entertainment in Catalan, the role of the public TVs in Catalan, and the future of the generational transmission of this language in 2021.

== Legacy ==
After the definitive shutting down of MiqueletsTV, other alternatives that continued the task of Catalan linguistic normalization and entertainment appeared. The first one to appear was BotiflersTV a few days after the closing of MiqueletsTV. It started broadcasting from midday with a similar format and nowadays starting in the afternoon. Despertaferro_TV appeared in May 2021 offering a schedule of Catalan dubbed movies to aim the promotion and reivindication of Catalan language and dubbing. Recently other channels offering Japanese animation dubbed in Catalan have appeared, such as animecatalà or 80spuntcat.

On September 3, 2021, Despertaferro_TV became the first Twitch channel to stream a Catalan dubbed movie legally (Long Way North) and on September 8 it streamed Fritzi – A Revolutionary Tale, after coming to terms with the Spanish distributor Pack Màgic for both movies.
