= TV3CAT =

Catalonian international television channel

- Country: Spain
- Broadcast area: International
- Headquarters: Sant Joan Despí

Programming
- Language: Catalan
- Picture format: 1080i HDTV

Ownership
- Owner: Catalan Media Corporation (Television of Catalonia)
- Sister channels: TV3

History
- Launched: 10 September 1995; 30 years ago
- Former names: Televisió de Catalunya Internacional (1995–2009)

Availability

Terrestrial
- DTT: Balearic Islands: 26 UHF

Streaming media
- Watch live

TV3CAT (known as Televisió de Catalunya Internacional until 29 May 2009) is an international Catalan language television channel owned by Catalan Media Corporation (CCMA) and operated by Television of Catalonia (TVC), a division of the CCMA.

Launched on Sunday 10 September 1995 as Televisió de Catalunya Internacional, its name was changed to TV3CAT on 29 May 2009. That channel was beaming to Europe through Astra satellite and America through Hispasat satellite. TV3CAT belonged to a group of channels where it was found programs from TV3, El 33, Super3, Esport3 and 3CatInfo. Since 1 May 2012, it stopped broadcasting on satellite television due to political financial cuts. The station continue broadcasting internationally via the internet and through cable and fiber operators.

== History ==
The channel started broadcasting on 10 September 1995 as Televisió de Catalunya Satéllit, with a 36-hour broadcast on the Hot Bird I satellite in Europe and north Africa, and on the Galaxy IV and Intelsat K satellites for most of the Americas, coinciding with Catalonia's National Day. This initial broadcast was seen as illegal by the Ministry of Public Administration, Transports and the Environment as illegal, not just because of its experimental character, but also because, in order for the autonomous channels of Spain to broadcast nationwide, there would be a reworking of the existing media law. The goal was to deliver Catalan programming for the diaspora of 400,000 Catalans living abroad; the same transponder also included a subcarrier with Catalunya Ràdio. The total cost was of 10 million pesetas, with four sponsors, with which TVC expected to receive 25 million pesetas from the experiment. TVC's goal was to commence regular satellite broadcasts in mid-1996.

On 21 July 2003, coinciding with the Vía Digital-CSD merger, TVC shut down the Hispasat feed (TVC Sat) and merged it into the Astra feed (TVCi), making it available on both satellites, on cable networks and on the TVC DTT multiplex.

On 1 May 2012, TV3CAT ceased satellite transmissions to Europe and the Americas, while strengthening its online presence.
