= K3 (TV channel) =

- Country: Spain (Catalonia)
- Broadcast area: Catalonia, Andorra, Northern Catalonia, Balearic Islands and Valencian Country
- Headquarters: Sant Joan Despí

Programming
- Language: Catalan
- Picture format: 16:9 & 4:3

Ownership
- Owner: Televisió de Catalunya

History
- Launched: 23 April 2001; 25 years ago
- Closed: 18 October 2009; 17 years ago

Links
- Website: www.k3tv.cat

K3 (Catalan pronunciation: [ˈka ˈtɾɛs]) was a Catalan public television channel operated by Televisió de Catalunya available in analogue and DTT in Catalonia, Balearic Islands, Valencia, Andorra, Northern Catalonia and partly in Aragon.

K3 was born in 2001 from the re-estructuration of TVC's second channel, Canal 33, that split it in two channels that shared the same frequency: 33 and K3. While this was valid for analogue broadcasting, the DDT broadcasting changed in December 2006. 33 got the old frequency on its own, while K3 shared its multiplex slot with the 300 channel.

K3 was a children/teenagers channel, that usually broadcasts from morning to 21:30 on weekdays and a couple of hours around midday on the weekend. It broadcast both entertainment and educational programs, with a wide range of ages. Early morning were usually dedicated to younger children, while the afternoon is more devoted to teenagers.

On 17 October 2009, the channel was replaced by Canal Super 3.

== History ==
K3 started broadcasting on 23 April 2001 at 7am, on the frequencies of Canal 33 from 7am to 8pm. Behind the scenes, a man dressed up in a Doraemon suit opened the channel in the K3/33 control room, for the purpose of an item to air on that evening's Info K. It inherited most of the shows that were on the Club Super 3 blocks on TV3 and Canal 33 (The Triplets, Ninja Hattori, Doraemon) as well as new titles. Coinciding with its launch came a news service at 7pm (Info K). The program is still on air on SX3 and has outlived K3 even maintaining the K in its title.

On 2 December 2006, K3 started timesharing with Canal 300 on its DTT multiplex, while also increasing the airtime on weekends (the analogue signal handed over to El 33, earlier on weekends). New strands were created for the weekend expansion:

- K Qmenci (feature films at 12pm);
- Hora 14 Tòquio (anime);
- Sidèria (sci-fi series)
- Hora Local (Catalan productions).

== Broadcast programming ==
=== Anime ===
- Arc the Lad
- Azuki
- Ai Yori Aoshi
- Bleach
- Bobobo
- Dragon Ball
- Dragon Ball Z
- Dragon Ball GT
- Boys Be...
- Death Note
- Candy Candy
- Space Pirate Captain Harlock
- City Hunter
- Clamp School Detectives
- Comic Party
- Future Boy Conan
- Corrector Yui
- Cowboy Bebop
- Detective Conan
- DNA²
- Dr. Slump
- Domo-kun
- Doraemon
- New Doctor Slump
- King Arthur
- The Twelve Kingdoms
- Escaflowne
- Magic User's Club
- FLCL
- Dragon Quest: Dai no Daibōken
- Fruits Basket
- Fushigi Yûgi
- Get Backers
- Georgie!
- Harley Spiny
- Ninja Hattori-kun
- I My Me! Strawberry Eggs
- Inuyasha
- Phantom Thief Jeanne
- Karekano
- Sgt. Frog
- Kimagure Orange Road
- Kiteretsu
- Kochikame
- Kamichama Karin
- Chō Kuse ni Narisō
- The Law of Ueki
- Lady Oscar
- Urusei Yatsura
- Mischievous Twins: The Tales of St. Clare's
- Love Hina
- Ojamajo Doremi
- Maison Ikkoku
- Maya the Honey Bee
- Mega Man
- Monster
- Musculman
- Nana
- Neo Ranga
- Neon Genesis Evangelion
- Ninja Boy Rantaro
- Ninja Hattori-kun
- NieA_7
- Nono-chan
- One Piece
- Sorcerous Stabber Orphen
- Planetes
- You're Under Arrest
- Ranma ½
- Remi
- Sailor Moon
- Cardcaptor Sakura
- Sakura Wars
- Samurai Champloo
- Serial Experiments Lain
- Shin Chan
- Slam Dunk
- Taro the Space Alien
- Trigun
- Tsubasa: Reservoir Chronicle
- Revolutionary Girl Utena
- Vicky the Viking
- Viewtiful Joe
- Yawara!
- Yu Yu Hakusho

=== Cartoons ===
- Waldo's Way
- Avatar: The Last Airbender
- Animated Tales of the World
- Angela Anaconda
- Bandolero
- Billy the Cat
- Blinky Bill
- Bob the Builder
- Braceface
- Calamity Jane
- Code Lyoko
- The Charlie Brown and Snoopy Show
- Cliff Hanger
- Clyde
- Xiaolin Showdown
- Tales from the Cryptkeeper
- Cyrano 2022
- Dennis the Menace
- Delfy and His Friends
- Doc Eureka
- Enigma
- Galactik Football
- Fantomcat
- The Flintstones
- Juanito Jones
- Inspector Gadget
- Inspector Mouse
- Oscar's Orchestra
- La brigada dels fossers
- La bruixa Avorrida
- The Pink Panther Show
- Chicken Minute
- Rocko's Modern Life
- Les aventures d'en Massagran
- The Adventures of Tintin
- The Triplets
- Wolves, Witches and Giants
- The Fruitties
- Lucky Luke
- Iris, The Happy Professor
- Roger Ramjet
- Hoppity Hooper
- Bobobobs
- Loggerheads
- Wacky Races
- Howdi Gaudi
- The Hoobs
- The Fruitties
- Braceface
- Jacob Two-Two
- Garfield and Friends
- CatDog
- Freaky Stories
- Make Way for Noddy
- Martin Mystery
- Mega Man
- Mona the Vampire
- Aaahh!!! Real Monsters
- Montana Jones
- Jabberjaw
- Kampung Boy
- Kaput & Zösky
- Norman Normal
- Hey Arnold!
- Oggy and the Cockroaches (seasons 1-3)
- Papyrus
- Princess Shéhérazade
- Pingu
- Pirate Family
- Chirpy the Sparrow
- Pocket Dragons
- Poochini
- Popeye the Sailor
- ReBoot
- The Ren & Stimpy Show
- Rocket Power
- The Rocky and Bullwinkle Show
- Rolie Polie Olie
- Rubbadubbers
- Scruff
- Scooby-Doo
- Space Goofs
- Spirou
- Stanley
- Sylvan
- Tabaluga
- Teletubbies
- Teo
- All Dogs Go to Heaven: The Series
- Teenage Mutant Ninja Turtles
- Totally Spies!
- Twipsy
- Una mà de contes
- X-Men
- X-DuckX
- Xiaolin Showdown
- 10+2

=== Shows ===
- Beverly Hills, 90210
- Babylon 5
- Celebrity Deathmatch
- Daria
- Doctor Who
- Downtown
- Edgemont
- Dr. Katz, Professional Therapist
- Beakman's World
- The Fresh Prince of Bel-Air
- Bewitched
- Farscape
- Hollyoaks
- Kenan & Kel
- Lizzie McGuire
- Parker Lewis Can't Lose
- Rex the Runt
- Rin=Dim
- As If
- Stargate
- Get Smart
- Thunderbirds
- Undergrads
- Zoe, Duncan, Jack and Jane

== See also ==
- Televisió de Catalunya
