= Afers exteriors =

2003 Catalan television travel show

- Genre: Travel documentary
- Directed by: Miquel Calçada
- Presented by: Miquel Calçada
- Country of origin: Catalonia
- Original language: Catalan
- No. of seasons: 7
- No. of episodes: 99

Production
- Producers: Ferran Cera; Miquel Calçada; Sergi Garcia
- Running time: 25–45 minutes

Original release
- Network: Televisió de Catalunya
- Release: 29 January 2003 – 2016

Afers exteriors (lit. "Foreign Affairs") is a Catalan television travel show created and presented by Miquel Calçada. It was produced and broadcast by Televisió de Catalunya. Each episode focuses on a different country or region of the world, usually with the aim of showing the life of the Catalan diaspora there.

The show premiered in 2003 and ran for seven seasons on channels TV3 and El 33, ending in 2016.

== Format ==
The programme typically follows a documentary format narrated and hosted by Catalan journalist Miquel Calçada, with occasional snippets of his own personal opinions and humour. In each episode, he visits a different region of the world to meet with people from the Catalan Countries who have emigrated there. In addition, the series highlights the historical impact of Catalans in these territories and frequently explores the social reality of the locals.

Seasons 6 and 7 were exceptionally more focused on the social issues of the time, such as the economic crisis, the war in Afghanistan and the Catalan sovereignty movement. They feature visits to countries that recently achieved independence (South Sudan) or countries with unsettled identity questions (Scotland and Gibraltar), with some themed episodes, such as those dedicated to the European Union and its economic situation.

== Release ==
The series first aired on 29 January 2003 and ran for five annual seasons until it was ended on 24 December 2009. Afers exteriors was brought back for a sixth season in 2014 and a seventh and final season in 2016. The final episode, a rewind of the entire series, aired on TV3 on 17 April 2016.

=== Seasons ===
Season	Original TV3 broadcast date	
Season	First episode	Last episode
1	29 January 2003	21 May 2003
2	14 April 2004	7 July 2004
3	6 October 2005	2 February 2006
4	22 May 2007	28 August 2007
5	17 September 2009	24 December 2009
6	20 January 2014	5 May 2014
7	10 January 2016	17 April 2016

== Episodes ==
=== Season 1 (2003) ===
No. overall	No. in season	Title	Area visited	Original release date
1	1	"Israel"	Israel	29 January 2003
2	2	"Àfrica"	Mali, Burkina Faso	2 February 2003
3	3	"Austràlia"	Australia	12 February 2003
4	4	"Espanya"	Madrid, Spain	19 February 2003
5	5	"Xile"	Chile	26 February 2003
6	6	"Suècia"	Sweden	12 March 2003
7	7	"L'Argentina"	Argentina	19 March 2003
8	8	"Cuba"	Cuba	26 March 2003
9	9	"Islàndia"	Iceland	2 April 2003
10	10	"El Brasil"	Brazil	16 April 2003
11	11	"Mèxic"	Mexico	3 April 2003
12	12	"Costa Rica"	Costa Rica	7 May 2003
13	13	"Els Estats Units"	United States	14 May 2003
14	14	"Resum"	Season recap	21 May 2003

=== Season 2 (2004) ===
No. overall	No. in season	Title	Area visited	Original release date
15	1	"Puerto Rico"	Puerto Rico	14 April 2004
16	2	"El Marroc"	Morocco	14 April 2004
17	3	"Àustria"	Austria	21 April 2004
18	4	"Nàpols"	Naples	28 April 2004
19	5	"Els Estats Units 1"	United States	5 May 2004
20	6	"Els Estats Units 2"	United States	12 May 2004
21	7	"Còrsega"	Corsica	19 May 2004
22	8	"Veneçuela"	Venezuela	2 June 2004
23	9	"El Vaticà"	Vatican City	9 June 2004
24	10	"El Japó 1"	Japan	16 June 2004
25	11	"El Japó 2"	Japan	23 June 2004
26	12	"República Txeca"	Czech Republic	30 June 2004
27	13	"Egipte"	Egypt	7 July 2004
28	14	"Resum"	Season recap	7 July 2004

=== Season 3 (2005–06) ===
No. overall	No. in season	Title	Area visited	Original release date
29	1	"Vietnam"	Vietnam	6 October 2005
30	2	"Perú"	Peru	13 October 2005
31	3	"L'Índia 1"	India	20 October 2005
32	4	"L'Índia 2"	India	27 October 2005
33	5	"Jordània"	Jordan	3 November 2005
34	6	"Holanda"	Holland, Netherlands	10 November 2005
35	7	"La Xina 1"	China, Hong Kong	17 November 2005
36	8	"La Xina 2"	China, Hong Kong	1 December 2005
37	9	"Irlanda"	Ireland	8 December 2005
38	10	"Amazones"	Amazonas, Brazil	5 January 2006
39	11	"Rússia"	Russia	12 January 2006
40	12	"La Patagònia"	Argentina	19 January 2006
41	13	"El Quebec"	Quebec, Canada	26 January 2006
42	14	"Resum"	Season recap	2 February 2006

=== Season 4 (2007) ===
No. overall	No. in season	Title	Area visited	Original release date
43	1	"Haití"	Haiti	22 May 2007
44	2	"Albània"	Albania	29 May 2007
45	3	"Finlàndia"	Finland	12 June 2007
46	4	"Tanzània"	Tanzania	19 June 2007
47	5	"Algèria 1"	Algeria	26 June 2007
48	6	"Algèria 2"	Algeria	3 July 2007
49	7	"Portugal"	Portugal	10 July 2007
50	8	"Les Filipines"	Philippines	17 July 2007
51	9	"El País Basc"	Basque Country, Spain	24 July 2007
52	10	"República de Sud-àfrica 1"	South Africa	31 July 2007
53	11	"República de Sud-àfrica 2"	South Africa	7 August 2007
54	12	"Nicaragua"	Nicaragua	14 August 2007
55	13	"La Polinèsia Francesa"	French Polynesia	21 August 2007
56	14	"Resum"	Season recap	28 August 2007

=== Season 5 (2009) ===
No. overall	No. in season	Title	Area visited	Original release date
57	1	"Guina Equatorial"	Equatorial Guinea	17 September 2009
58	2	"Anglaterra clàssica"	England	24 September 2009
59	3	"Anglaterra moderna"	England	1 October 2009
60	4	"Corea del Nord"	North Korea	8 October 2009
61	5	"Grècia"	Greece	15 October 2009
62	6	"El somni americà 1"	United States	22 October 2009
63	7	"El somni americà 2"	United States	29 October 2009
64	8	"Dubai"	Dubai, United Arab Emirates	5 November 2009
65	9	"Suïssa 1"	Switzerland	12 November 2009
66	10	"Suïssa 2"	Switzerland	19 November 2009
67	11	"L'Uruguai"	Uruguay	26 November 2009
68	12	"Les Seychelles"	Seychelles	3 December 2009
69	13	"Turquia"	Turkey	10 December 2009
70	14	"Mongòlia"	Mongolia	17 December 2009
71	15	"Adéu i gràcies"	Season recap	24 December 2009

=== Season 6 (2014) ===
No. overall	No. in season	Title	Area visited	Original release date
72	1	"L'Afganistan"	Afghanistan	20 January 2014
73	2	"Escòcia"	Scotland	27 January 2014
74	3	"El Pakistan"	Pakistan	10 February 2014
75	4	"Economia"	Economics-themed episode	17 February 2014
76	5	"Gibraltar"	Gibraltar	24 February 2014
77	6	"Israel"	Israel	3 March 2014
78	7	"Bolívia 1"	Bolivia	10 March 2014
79	8	"Bolívia 2"	Bolivia	17 March 2014
80	9	"Europa segle XX"	European history-themed episode	31 March 2014
81	10	"Unió Europea"	European Union (Brussels, Strasbourg)	7 April 2014
82	11	"Sicília"	Sicily	14 April 2014
83	12	"Els Estats Units"	United States	21 April 2014
84	13	"Xipre"	Cyprus	28 April 2014
85	13	"Últim capítol"	Season recap	5 May 2014

=== Season 7 (2016) ===
No. overall	No. in season	Title	Area visited	Original release date
86	1	"El Sudan del Sud"	South Sudan	10 January 2016
87	2	"Qatar"	Qatar	17 January 2016
88	3	"Eslovènia"	Slovenia	24 January 2016
89	4	"Kènia"	Kenya	7 February 2016
90	5	"Corea del Sud 1"	South Korea	14 February 2016
91	6	"Corea del Sud 2"	South Korea	21 February 2016
92	7	"Malta"	Malta	28 February 2016
93	8	"Noruega"	Norway	6 March 2016
94	9	"Colòmbia 1"	Colombia	13 March 2016
95	10	"Colòmbia 2"	Colombia	20 March 2016
96	11	"Singapur"	Singapore	27 March 2016
97	12	"Jamaica"	Jamaica	3 April 2016
98	13	"Romania"	Romania	10 April 2016
99	14	"Resum"	Full series recap and finale	17 April 2016

== Reception ==
During original air time, the programme was generally extraordinarily well received in terms of audience ratings. The premiere of the second season achieved a 23.1% share, with the fifth season peaking at 23.3% and the sixth season averaging 16.2%. Just after its first season, the show won the Catalunya Exterior award, presented to journalistic projects focused on the Catalan diaspora. After the end of the fifth season, it won the Ràdio Associació award.

Regarding critical remarks, in 2010, Hèctor López, writing for Avui, made reference to the North Korea episode, in which Calçada meets Alejandro Cao de Benós, a representative of the country's Ministry of Foreign Affairs. He noted that the episode depicted an overly entertaining view from urban areas, without enabling viewers to see "the villages plunged into misery."

In 2014, the series' sixth season was criticised by parties PSC and PP for featuring a CiU electoral candidate and for the presence of a Catalan estelada badge worn by Calçada.
