= Canal 300 =

Defunct Catalonian TV channel

Canal 300 (Catalan pronunciation: [kəˈnal ˌtɾɛˈsens]) was a Spanish free-to-air television channel operated by Televisió de Catalunya, launched on 28 November 2005 only in DTT as part of TVC's five channel multiplex.

300 only broadcast series and movies previously seen on TV3 and 33/K3, both of their own production (20% of the schedule) or foreign. Included in its schedule were Dallas, Bewitched, Bonanza, Star Trek, The Brittas Empire, Married... with Children, Diagnosis: Murder, The Twilight Zone and Strong Medicine, as well as TVC's produced series such as Secrets de Família, Oh! Europa, Jet Lag, Majoria Absoluta, L'un per l'altre, Plats Bruts and Quico.

The channel was launched in experimental format on November 21, 2005 as the first Televisió de Catalunya channel launched exclusively for digital terrestrial television. On November 28, 2005, the channel started its official broadcasts.

From December 3, 2006, 300 timeshared with K3 from 21:30 to 7:00. It lost the 21:00-21:30 time slot on February 15, 2010, due to the end of Canal Super3's analog timeshare with 33.

On May 14, 2010, TV3 announced the closure of the channel, scheduled for September 19, and was going to be replaced with a new channel, 3XL.

== See also ==
- TV3
