= Plats bruts =

- Genre: Sitcom
- Created by: Joel Joan and Jordi Sánchez
- Starring: Joel Joan; Jordi Sánchez; Anna Ma Barbany; Mònica Glaenzel; Montse Pérez; Pau Durà; Lluís X. Villanueva
- Opening theme: By Quimi Portet
- Ending theme: By Quimi Portet
- Country of origin: Spain
- Original language: Catalan
- No. of seasons: 6
- No. of episodes: 73

Production
- Producers: Kràmpack, El Terrat and Televisió de Catalunya
- Production location: Barcelona
- Camera setup: Multiple Camera
- Running time: Between 25 - 30 minutes

Original release
- Network: Televisió de Catalunya
- Release: 19 April 1999 – 2002

Plats bruts (Catalan pronunciation: [ˈpladz ˈβɾuts], literally "Dirty Dishes") was a sitcom broadcast by TV3. The show follows the life of Josep Lopes and David Güell. The show was co-produced by Kràmpack, El Terrat and Televisió de Catalunya and directed by Oriol Grau, Lluís Manyoses and Joel Joan. The series, which ran for 73 episodes of between 25 and 30 minutes over six seasons, was broadcast between April 19, 1999 and April 15, 2002.

Plats Bruts enjoyed very good ratings from the beginning, reaching up to a million viewers in the second episode broadcast, and achieved an average of over 35% share and 900,000 viewers in Catalonia. Afterwards the series was broadcast on Canal 300 and 3XL and dubbed into Spanish so it could be aired on Vía Digital, a digital platform which a predecessor of Movistar Plus and ETB 2, a channel broadcasting in the Basque Country.

The series generally contained self-contained stories, with no continuous plot. During its emission it received very good reviews thanks to its fresh and amusing script and due to the cast of actors, several of whom went on to enjoy fame at a national level, including Jordi Sánchez. The show regularly makes fun of Catalan society, especially in its references to Catalanism.

== Synopsis ==
Lopes and David are two men who share a flat in the Eixample district of Barcelona. The relationship between the two exists because Lopes was David's Boy Scout leader when he was young but, in terms of their personality, they are not at all alike. In the first episode, when they both visit an apartment which is up for rent, they decide to share.

Lopes is a failure: a 34-year-old bachelor who has to share a flat because he has on a "junk contract" at Ràdio Bofarull, where he works as an announcer. David is a somewhat spoiled young man who one day decides to break with his life and move out of his parents' house, although he still receives a weekly allowance and takes his house assistant, Carbonell, with him. He is convinced that he has the talent to be an actor and studies at the Institut del Teatre in Barcelona.

== Main characters ==
The two main characters are Lopes (Jordi Sánchez) and David (Joel Joan), who share an apartment, and Emma (Mònica Glaenzel), the neighbor who lives in a wooden cabin on the building's rooftop. Other important characters include Ramon (Lluís Xavier Villanueva) and Mercedes (Montse Pérez), who work at the same radio station as Lopes; Carbonell (Anna Maria Barbany), David's housekeeper; and Pol (Pau Durà), David’s classmate at the Institut del Teatre and a waiter at Café Maurici.

In the final episodes of the fourth season, Carbonell and Pol leave the neighborhood (as the actors exit the series), and new characters join: David's grandmother (Mercè Comes) and Stasky (Borja Espinosa), the new bartender at the café.

Other secondary characters include Marina (Carme Pla), David’s girlfriend for a few episodes; David’s parents (Vicky Peña and Jesús Ferrer); Lopes’ father (Jordi Banacolocha); Doctor Prim (Carles Canut), the physician who treats the characters; and Guillermina (Mercè Martínez), Lopes’ girlfriend at the end of the series.

== Episodes ==
Like many sitcoms, the show's episode titles followed a naming convention: all but four started with the word "tinc" meaning "I have", and the exceptions to the rule varied only slightly, beginning with words like "Tenim" (we have), "No tinc" (I don't have) or "Ho tinc" ("I have it").

The show's greatest controversy was an episode titled "Tinc una revelació" ("I have a revelation"), which was censured for some time. In the episode, David develops a Messiah complex after watching The Passion of the Christ, before finally giving way to temptation in the form of Lopes' visiting female friend. It was not broadcast during the show's reruns or via online platforms. Finally in 2018, after receiving questions from Catalan newspaper Ara, TV3 made the episode available to watch online.

The show's final episode was "Tinc Touchdown" ("I have a touchdown") and featured the Barcelona Dragons American football team.
