= Temps d'aventura =

Temps d'aventura (Time for adventure) is a programme in Catalan made by Televisió de Catalunya - the Catalan public television corporation - dedicated to open-air sports or adventure sports or outdoor activities. It was first broadcast during the 2002 season following on from other programmes that had dealt with the same subject -L'aventura (1993–2000) - and winter sports - Temps de neu (1985 - ).

It is a weekly programme and is broadcast on Thursday evenings by Canal 33 from May to November and can also be watched on the international channel TVCi. Most programmes are repeated over the weekend.

Since the 2003 season it has been broadcast in stereo.

From the 2008 season onwards it has been broadcast in 16:9 format and with subtitles in Catalan for the deaf. The DTTV broadcast also includes English subtitles. This makes it the first programme produced in-house by Televisió de Catalunya that can be watched in English.

TV3 is Televisió de Catalunya's first and main channel. All the people of Catalonia and Catalan Countries in the rest of Spain are potential viewers.

== Contents ==
The programme normally consists of a report, with a duration of between 10 and 20 minutes on average, and several sections that have changed over the seasons.

The reports are about activities that take place in the mountains, in the air or on water and are designed to highlight the activities of people who do the sport.

Most of the reports can be categorised into one of these four general groups:

- relatively unknown sporting activities
- profiles of outstanding sportsmen and women in different fields
- competitions
- in-house creations

The programme includes or has included the following sections:

- racons (ideas for discovering new routes)
- nius (short news items)
- i a + ... (short reports lasting 3–5 minutes)
- alerta (safety advice from the GRAE of the Firefighterss of the Generalitat)
- embat (news about water sports)
- vici-bici (news about sports involving the bicycle)
- en forma (tips for getting fit given by instructors from DiR)
- aparador (recommendations about equipment given by specialised shops)
- musical (reports accompanied by music)
- somni d'aventura (competition to win a sports trip to a place of interest)

== Internet ==
The programme has always been closely linked to the Internet and this has increased over the seasons. It started in 2002 when the programme opened its own web page.

In 2003 video streaming began and has continued apart from short interruptions until now. It was only the second TV3 programme to incorporate this.

In 2006 the podcasting of reports began, making it the first TV3 programme and one of the first in Europe to offer this option.

In 2008 a streaming and a podcast version subtitled in English was begun. There is also a streaming version with subtitles for the deaf. Altogether, the programme can be accessed on the Internet in 6 different ways:

- streaming of the programme in Catalan
- streaming of the programme in Catalan with English subtitles
- streaming of the programme in Catalan with Catalan subtitles
- streaming of the report in Catalan
- podcast of the report in Catalan
- podcast of the report in Catalan with English subtitles

In 2008 the programme also incorporated a map browser using Google Maps which allows users to zoom in on the geographical area where the reports were made and makes it possible to view the complete report broadcast by the programme.

In 2009 simplifies the subtitles system. The programme upload reports to YouTube to be available the automatic translation to many languages. The quality improve and a HD 720 version is available too.

Most viewer participation is carried out via the web page: photo, video, competitions, posts on the forum, answers to questions, etc.

== Community ==
In addition to the television programme and its presence on the Internet, Temps d'Aventura has been involved in other initiatives which have broadened the programme's scope.

Since 2006, and together with Open Natura, it has produced a limited number of mountain bikes painted in the programme's logo and its colours and can be won by participants in one of the competitions.

In 2007, together with Temps de Neu, it produced a wall calendar with photos of the participants in one of the competitions.

In 2007, together with the publishing house Cossetània Edicions, it published the book "Racons. 22 excursions on foot and mountain bike sent in by the programme's viewers" ISBN 978-84-9791-285-3

In 2008 the initiative was repeated with the book Racons 08. ISBN 978-84-9791-375-1

The programme has also organised several trips and an orienteering course involving viewers from the programme. It has also produced Buff decorated with the programme's colours and logo.

== Prizes ==
2003: Zàpping prize 2002 for the best sports programme, awarded by Teleespectadors Associats de Catalunya.

2003: prize for the best state documentary at the VI Ciudad de Santander International Sport Film Festival for the documentary Blind Summit, broadcast on 7 July 2002. The film shows the experiences of a group of blind climbers while climbing Mt Aneto.

2004: at the 22nd edition of the International Festival of Mountain and Adventure Films of Torelló the plaque of the Federación Española de Deportes de Montaña y Escalada for the "best film by a Spanish producer " was awarded to Jaume Altadill for Important things walk slowly a biography about two of the pioneers of Catalan mountaineering: Josep Manuel Anglada and Jordi Pons.

2006: at the 24th edition of the International Festival of Mountain and Adventure Films of Torelló the plaque of the Spanish Federation of Mountain Sports and Climbing for the "best film by a Spanish producer" was awarded to Jimi Pujol for El Cavall Bernat a re-creation of the first ascent of this needle at Montserrat, broadcast on 27 October 2005, the 70th anniversary of this feat.

== Temps d'Aventura Prize ==
Since 2004 the programme has sponsored a prize, which takes its name from the programme, and is awarded at the International Festival of Mountain and Adventure Films of Torelló. The prize is awarded to the film that is best adapted for television.

Prize-winning films are:

- 2004: "Hydrophilia" by Jesús Bosque. Spain
- 2005: "Dhaulagiri 1954: Argentines in the Himalayas" by Ignacio Aguirre and Romina Coronel. Argentina.
- 2006: "GurlaMandata.com" by Johan Perrier. France
- 2007: "Patagonia Dreams" by M. Lecomte, O. Favresse, S. Villanueva and N. Favresse. Belgium.
- 2008: "Knocking on heaven's door" by Robin Kaleta. Czech Republic.

== Team ==
- Director: Antoni Real
- Producer: Narcís Noguera
- Production Manager:

- Anna Maria López 2009
- Pietat Gallardo (2008)
- Ester Poses (2006-2007)
- Lluís Palahí (2002-2005)

- Editor:

- Jordi Fandiño 2005
- Josep Maria Puig (2002-2006)

- Production

- Jimi Pujol 2004
- Xavier Casillanis (2008)
- Víctor Díaz (2002-2003)

== Index for reports ==
Date	View the report	Subtitles and full interview
November 27, 2008	Edurne Pasaban	interview catalan subtitles english subtitles
November 20, 2008	Salt BASE	catalan subtitles english subtitles
November 13, 2008	Busseig a l'Alguer	catalan subtitles english subtitles
November 6, 2008	La Noguera amb aigua	catalan subtitles english subtitles
October 30, 2008	Zermatt	catalan subtitles english subtitles
October 23, 2008	Illa Reunió	catalan subtitles english subtitles
October 16, 2008	Facing Obsession
October 9, 2008	Esther Núñez	interview catalan subtitles english subtitles
October 2, 2008	Sergi en BTT del Delta a l'Aneto	catalan subtitles english subtitles
September 25, 2008	Kilian Jornet campió a Pasturo	interview catalan subtitles english subtitles
September 18, 2008	Globus al Montsec	catalan subtitles english subtitles
September 4, 2008	Les Dolomites amb guia català	catalan subtitles english subtitles
August 28, 2008	Rif i amazics	catalan subtitles english subtitles
August 21, 2008	Cims paral·lels	catalan subtitles english subtitles
August 14, 2008	Paramotors / Schackleton	english subtitles
August 7, 2008	Com penjar-se	catalan subtitles english subtitles
July 31, 2008	Patagonia dreams	catalan subtitles english subtitles
July 24, 2008	Gisela Pulido	catalan subtitles english subtitles
July 17, 2008	Ot Pi	catalan subtitles english subtitles
July 10, 2008	Busseig infantil	catalan subtitles english subtitles
July 3, 2008	Cims paral·lels	catalan subtitles english subtitles
June 26, 2008	Joves a la vela oceànica	catalan subtitles english subtitles
June 19, 2008	El Cerví	catalan subtitles english subtitles
June 12, 2008	Schackleton	english subtitles
June 5, 2008	Copa món BTT a Vallnord	catalan subtitles english subtitles
May 29, 2008	Xavi Arias al Cho Oyu	catalan subtitles english subtitles
May 22, 2008	Equipació de barrancs	catalan subtitles english subtitles
May 15, 2008	Paramotors	catalan subtitles english subtitles
May 8, 2008	Com penjar-se	catalan subtitles english subtitles
November 29, 2007	Resum 2007
November 22, 2007	Escoltes
November 15, 2007	Geocaching
November 8, 2007	Rif i amazics
November 1, 2007	Llibre Racons 08
October 25, 2007	Jet Man 2
October 18, 2007	Sergi al Sàhara
October 11, 2007	Globus Groenlàndia
October 4, 2007	Chamonix
September 27, 2007	Zegama i Kilian Jornet
September 20, 2007	Amat Artigas i Tour Ultime
September 13, 2007	Mike Horn
September 6, 2007	Noruega
August 30, 2007	Reflexions vertical T. Arbonés
August 23, 2007	Front Segre + Patrick Blanc
August 16, 2007	Gurlamandata.com sencer
August 9, 2007	Raiers + Xerpes Torelló
August 2, 2007	Dhaulagiri 54 sencer
July 26, 2007	Busseig Pallars
July 19, 2007	Tony Hawk
July 12, 2007	Còrsega
July 5, 2007	Caiac Formentera
June 28, 2007	Curs orientació
June 21, 2007	Copa Món Parapent a Àger
June 14, 2007	Robby Naish
June 7, 2007	Projecte Ales
May 31, 2007	Gurlamandata.com
May 24, 2007	Marató Berga
May 17, 2007	Leucata
May 10, 2007	BTT TDA Bardenas
November 23, 2006	Llibre Racons 07
November 16, 2006	Vies Verdes Girona
November 9, 2006	Raid Cavalls
November 2, 2006	Sanllehy windsurf
October 26, 2006	BTT solitari Mongòlia
October 19, 2006	Aeròdrom Skydive Empuriabrava
October 12, 2006	Submarinisme Medjerda
October 5, 2006	Cova urbana Tarragona
September 28, 2006	Jet Man
September 21, 2006	Caiac germans Domenjó
September 14, 2006	Parapent Canigó
September 7, 2006	Patrick Blanc nen kitesurfista
August 31, 2006	Patins línia + Xerpes Torelló
August 24, 2006	Brokken + À. Pella
August 17, 2006	Marmoler + Air Race
August 10, 2006	1a. Cavall Bernat + De un hilo
July 27, 2006	Pedals de Foc
July 20, 2006	Raid Alps
July 13, 2006	60 anys Alpina
July 6, 2006	Xerpes
June 29, 2006	Raiers
June 22, 2006	7 parets 7 continents
June 15, 2006	Refugis Guerra Civil
June 8, 2006	Dhaulagiri 54 Dhaulagiri 54
June 1, 2006	BTT solitari Namíbia
May 25, 2006	Copa Amèrica a 1 any
May 18, 2006	Catalans a l'Everest
May 11, 2006	Rescat Bombers
November 24, 2005	Resum + Catalans a l'Everest
November 17, 2005	La Palma parapent
November 10, 2005	La Palma ruta
November 3, 2005	Cavalls camí Bons Homes
October 27, 2005	1a al Cavall Bernat
October 20, 2005	Parc Aigüestortes
October 13, 2005	Curs de vela
October 6, 2005	3 boards
September 29, 2005	Ramon Julian a La Rambla
September 22, 2005	Raid Alps
September 15, 2005	Catamarà Didgeridoo
September 8, 2005	Bruno Brokken
September 1, 2005	Cova Espluga Francolí
August 25, 2005	Catalans a l'Everest
August 18, 2005	Sergi BTT solitari desert EUA
August 11, 2005	Cent 3.000 CEC Bages
August 4, 2005	Vol a vela sense motor
July 28, 2005	Copa Món Raids Andorra
July 21, 2005	Patins a BCN
July 14, 2005	Ferrada Luque i Sergi Mingote
July 7, 2005	Cuita el sol
June 30, 2005	GPS i BTT
June 23, 2005	Ellen McArthur
June 16, 2005	Roger Casal
June 9, 2005	Parcs Catalunya Nord
June 2, 2005	Cursa Zegama
May 26, 2005	Barranc Alcoi
May 19, 2005	Hidrofília
May 12, 2005	Marató Antàrtida
May 5, 2005	Denali
November 25, 2004	Resum 2004
November 18, 2004	Camí Inca
November 11, 2004	Espeleo Tavertet
November 4, 2004	Escalada Noruega
October 28, 2004	Noies aventureres
October 21, 2004	Home de ferro
October 14, 2004	Ahansal - Marató Sables
October 7, 2004	Wakeboard
September 30, 2004	Paracaigudisme canopy
September 23, 2004	Matagalls-Montserrat
September 16, 2004	Anglada-Pons
September 9, 2004	Kitesurf Massegué
September 2, 2004	Carros de foc
August 26, 2004	Curs tècnics - de la Mata
August 19, 2004	K-2
August 12, 2004	Raid dones
August 5, 2004	Raid Desman 2004
July 29, 2004	Surf Occy
July 22, 2004	Solitari BTT Patagonia
July 15, 2004	Raid Alps
July 8, 2004	Guillem Altadill
July 1, 2004	Freeride Bicicleta
June 24, 2004	Bastiments
June 17, 2004	Josune Bereziartu
June 10, 2004	Ironman Ebre
June 3, 2004	Cavour submarinisme
May 27, 2004	Globus Pirineu
May 20, 2004	Dones Everest
May 13, 2004	Raid al Marroc
May 6, 2004	Cavalls neu Ripollès
November 27, 2003	Resum 2003
November 20, 2003	Espeleo Boixaguer
November 13, 2003	100 anys aviació
November 6, 2003	Germans Misser
October 30, 2003	Maryfamilia
October 23, 2003	Umberto Pelizzari
October 9, 2003	Nel Martín
October 2, 2003	Caiac Menorca
September 25, 2003	Submarinisme en coves
September 18, 2003	Sevilla salts esquí
September 11, 2003	Raid Guara
September 4, 2003	3 escaladors
August 28, 2003	Caiac extrem
August 21, 2003	Marga Fullana
August 14, 2003	Ala Delta
August 7, 2003	Desman 2003
July 31, 2003	Germans Rodriguez
July 24, 2003	Sa Fosca
July 17, 2003	Quilòmetre vertical - Alps
July 10, 2003	Tarifa
July 3, 2003	Cavalls Garrotxa
June 26, 2003	Bessones Ruano Moreno
June 19, 2003	Raid Gauloises 2003
June 12, 2003	Salt BASE Matterhorn
June 5, 2003	Marmoler
May 29, 2003	Everest - 50 anys cim de Hillary i Norgay
May 22, 2003	Everest - Mingote al cim
May 15, 2003	Everest - Fausto de Stefani
May 8, 2003	Everest - fins Camp 2
November 28, 2002	Resum 2002
November 21, 2002	Iniciació a l'espeleologia al Garraf
November 14, 2002	BTT Puigcerdà 3 ciclistes
November 7, 2002	Agulla Alps
October 31, 2002	Paracaigudisme
October 24, 2002	Duatló Núria
October 17, 2002	Raid Sierra Nevada
October 10, 2002	Rècord windsurf
October 3, 2002	Vies ferrades
September 19, 2002	Raid Tirol
September 12, 2002	Mont Blanc amb cecs
September 5, 2002	Parapent Àger
August 29, 2002	X-Games a Barcelona
August 22, 2002	Raid Califòrnia
August 15, 2002	Equip Extrem al Barranc de l'Infern
August 8, 2002	Marató Vall d'Aran
August 1, 2002	Joan Vila
July 18, 2002	Sílvia Vidal
July 11, 2002	Raid Alps 2002
July 4, 2002	Aneto amb expedició cecs
