= Jordi Sánchez (actor) =

Spanish actor and screenwriter (born 1964)

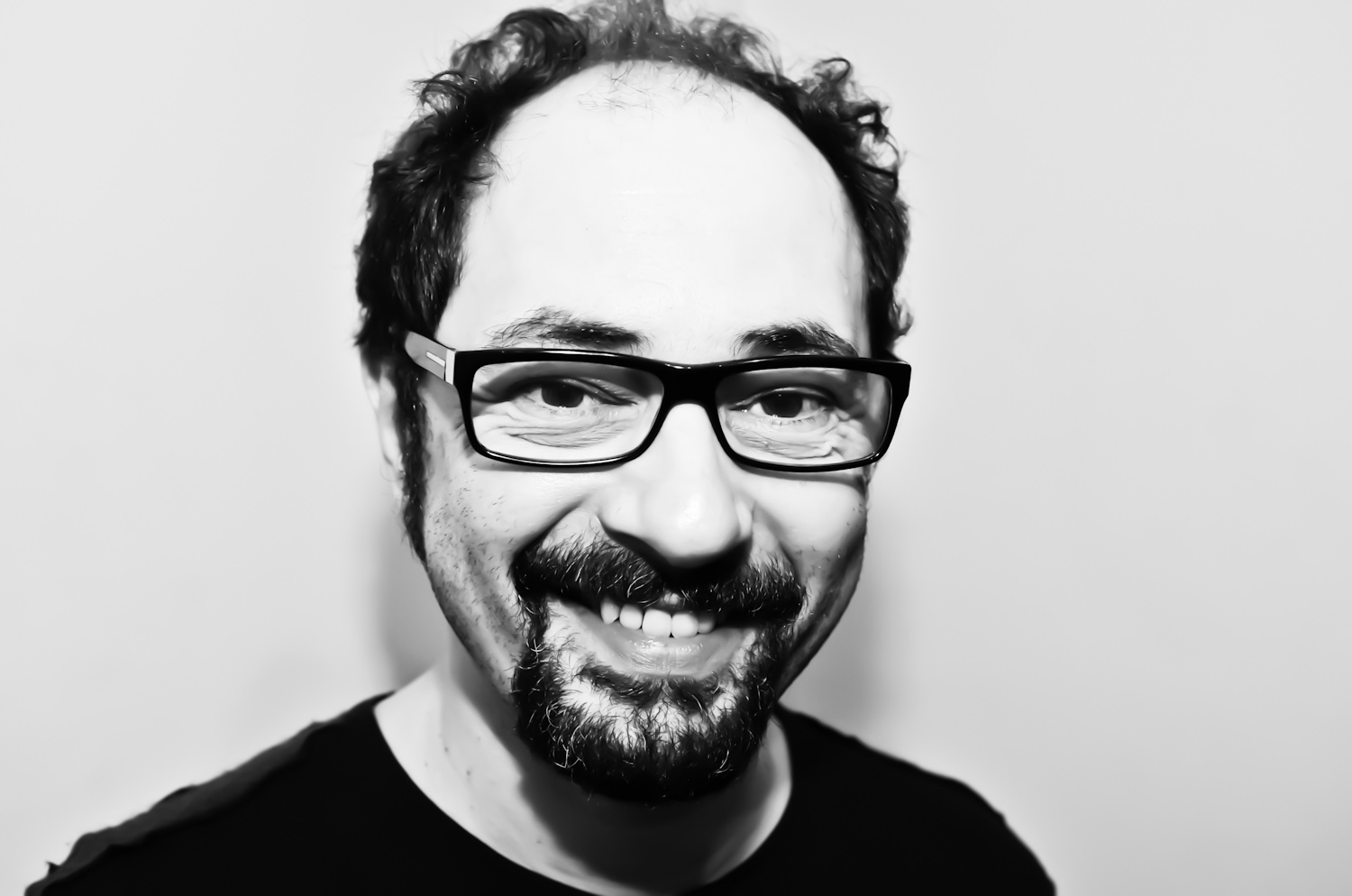
- Born: Jordi Sánchez Zaragoza; 13 May 1964 (age 61); Barcelona, Spain
- Occupation: Actor
- Known for: La que se avecina Plats bruts

Jordi Sánchez Zaragoza (born 13 May 1964) is a Spanish actor and screenwriter, mostly known for his role as Antonio Recio in La que se avecina and Josep Lopes in Plats bruts. He got a Certificate of Advanced Study on nursing at the Universidad Autónoma de Barcelona.

He appeared in TV 3 with Joel Joan for the Twelve Grapes at the 2001 New Year's Eve. In 2011 he published Humanos que me encontré, an autobiographical novel about his childhood and adolescence. In 2015 he wrote the stage play El eunuco, based on The Eunuch by Terence.

He appeared in the comedy film Bajo el mismo techo (2019), starring with Silvia Abril.

== Work as a writer and dramatist ==
=== Television ===
- L'un per l'altre, with Pep Antón Gómez, Sergi Pompermayer y David Plana.
- Plats bruts, with Joel Joan.
- La que se avecina, with Laura Caballero y Alberto Caballero.

=== Theatre ===
- El eunuco, with Pep Antón Gómez
- Mitad y mitad, with Pep Antón Gómez
- Asesinos todos, with Pep Antón Gómez
- Hoy no cenamos, with Pep Antón Gómez
- Excusas, with Joel Joan
- Soy fea, con Sergi Belbel
- Krámpack
- Fum, fum, fum
- Mareig

=== Cinema ===
- Amigos...
- Todo irá bien
- Se vende
- Excusas

== Work as an actor ==
=== Theatre ===
- Mareig (1993)
- Yvonne, princesa de Borgoña (1993)
- El mercader de Venecia (1994)
- El avaro (1996)
- Sóc lletja (1997)
- Soy fea (1998)
- Kràmpack (1998)
- Excuses (2000)
- Sexos (2003)
- El trámite (2015)

=== Cinema ===
Year	Title	Character	Director
1993	Monturiol, el senyor del mar		Francesc Bellmunt
1994	Mi hermano del alma	Claudio	Mariano Barroso
1994	Transeúntes		Luis Aller
1995	El perqué de tot plegat	Piti	Ventura Pons
1996	Susanna	Félix	Antonio Chavarrías
1997	Un caso para dos	Ferrer	Antonio Chavarrías
2000	Orígens	Llorenç	Raimond Masllorens
2003	Excuses!		Joel Joan
2007	Presumptes implicats	Ramón	Enric Folch
2007	My Way	Rafa	J. A. Salgot
2009	Estació de l'oblit	Taxista	Cristian Molina
2011	Clara Campoamor. La mujer olvidada	Gil Robles	Laura Mañá
2012	En fuera de juego	Jordi	David Marqués
2012	Love Wars	Soldado Imperial	Vicente Bonet
2015	Ahora o nunca	Fermín	María Ripoll
2016	Cuerpo de Élite	Pep Canivell	Joaquín Mazón
2016	No culpes al karma de lo que te pasa por gilipollas	Arturo	María Ripoll
2017	La higuera de los bastardos		Ana Murugarren
2017	Lord, Give Me Patience	Gregorio	Álvaro Díaz Lorenzo
2018	"Formentera Lady"		Pau Durà
2018	Bajo el mismo techo	Adrian	Juana Macías
