= Tot es mou =

- Genre: News magazine
- Directed by: Roser Plana, Helena Garcia Melero
- Presented by: Helena Garcia Melero
- Country of origin: Spain
- Original language: Catalan

Production
- Executive producers: Cristian Trepat, Mario Daza
- Producers: Èlia Anton, Míriam Botí, Toni Galobardes, Pilar Senillosa
- Production location: Barcelona
- Editors: Marc Pérez, Jordi Sanromà
- Running time: 3 hours 20 minutes
- Production company: Televisió de Catalunya

Original release
- Network: TV3
- Release: February 5, 2018 – present

Tot es mou (English: Everything is Moving) is a Catalan news magazine and entertainment show that broadcasts live on TV3, presented by Helena Garcia Melero.

The programme deals with current affairs topics in politics, culture and society, also featuring more light-hearted segments, interviews and debates, as well as special recurring segments with frequent collaborators. Some regular contributors known for their appearances on the programme include Pilar Rahola, Carlos Enrique Bayo, Mireia Boya, Cristina Fallarás, Max Pradera, Elisa Beni, Antón Losada, Carme Ruscalleda, Juliana Canet, Elisenda Pineda and Dani Jiménez.

At the beginning of 2018, in order to reduce costs, TV3 decided to cancel several externally-produced shows with similar news magazine formats, including Tarda oberta, headed by Vador Lladó and Ruth Jiménez, as well as A tota pantalla, presented by Núria Roca. In their place, TV3 decided to create Tot es mou as a news magazine show for the afternoon slot that would be produced in-house, with the show first airing on 5 February 2018. The first episode was an audience leader with 14.2% of viewing share, beating its main competitor in the same slot (Telecinco's Sálvame, 12.3%), improving on the debut episodes of previously cancelled shows in the same format (Tarda oberta had debuted with only a 5.7% audience share).

As part of a schedule change, the programme shifted to the morning slot on 5 September 2022, now airing from 10:30 to 13:50, in the timeslot previously occupied by Planta baixa.
