= Miquel Calçada =

Catalan journalist and communicating entrepreneur

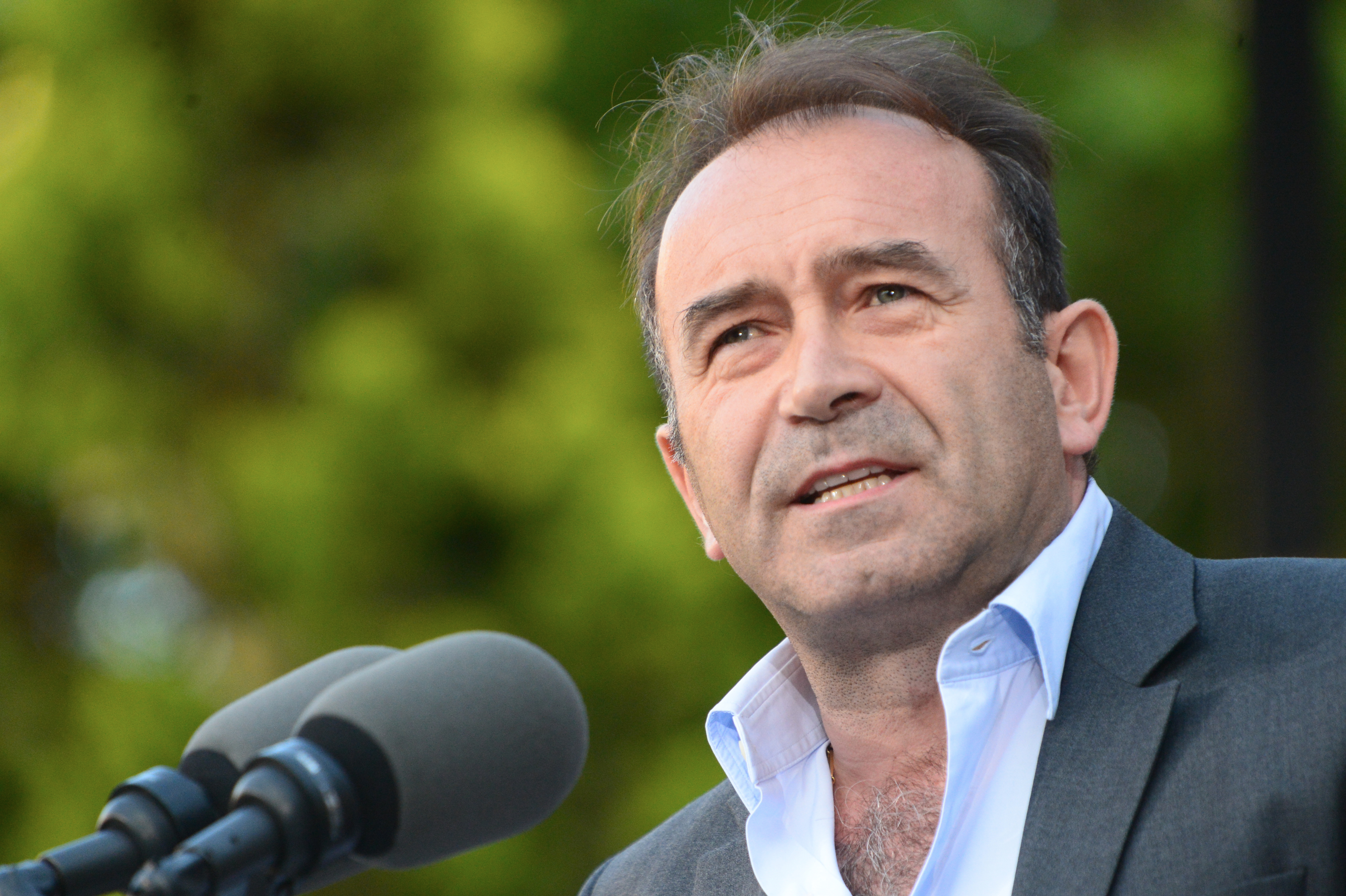
- Miquel Calçada in 2016
- Born: 13 August 1965 (age 61); Sabadell, Catalonia, Spain
- Occupation: Journalist
- Years active: 1987

Miquel Calçada Olivella (Catalan pronunciation: [miˈkɛl kəlˈsaðə]; born 13 August 1965 in Sabadell, near Barcelona) is a Spanish communicating entrepreneur.

== Career ==
At age 15, he started participating in a local radio show (Ràdio Terrassa). At 18, he became the voice that announced the return of the Catalan Public Radio (Catalunya Ràdio) since the Spanish Civil War. He is a content producer and talk show host. On TV3 his Mikimoto Club was a talk show, and aired weekly. This was his first TV debut. When the show went on prime time and live, he was the very first talk show host in Spanish TV. Persones humanes became known for its ironic sometimes absurd but always incisive humour on different issues. A whole generation remember his speeches as well as legendary appearances from the writer Quim Monzó. He quit TV for seven years focusing on its two recent born radio stations, Flaix FM and Ràdio Flaixbac, set among the three most tuned into musical stations. Return of his TV career in 2003 has achieved massive audience figures and recognition during five seasons with Afers exteriors, a sociological TV project that led him travel on around 60 countries introducing expatriates life to its audience.

As an independent producer won the bid from the Catalan Government to produce a series of 70 chapters on environmental issues: El capità Enciam. After quitting smoking in 2005, he was so impressed by the method he used that he created the two-part special program El mètode Larson.

Devoted to public issues and history, he has been writing as a free columnist in newspapers such as La Vanguardia and Avui. He is a founder member of Club Riva de Catalunya from the Riva Historical Society.

Calçada currently holds an Executive Master Public Administration degree from the Maxwell School of Citizenship and Public Affairs of Syracuse University.

The Pacifica Foundation announced Miquel Calçada will be the next General Manager of radio station KPFK FM 90.7 in Los Angeles, California, on July 19, 2021, in an email to subscribers. Calçada resigned from his position as KPFK Station Manager in March 2022.

== Programs ==
In Catalunya Ràdio he hosted these highlighted programs:

- Catalunya DX
- En pijama el cap de setmana
- Mikimoto Club
- Pasta gansa

He has hosted and directed several TV series:

- Oh, Bongònia, TV3 (1987)
- Mikimoto Club, TV3 (1989–1990)
- Mikimoto Clip, La 2 (1990–1992)
- Persones humanes, TV3 (1993–1996)
- Solvència contrastada, TV3 (1996)
- El mètode Larson, TV3 (2005)
- Prohibit als tímids, TV3 (2006)
- Afers exteriors, TV3 (2003–2009, 2016–present)
