= 3CatInfo (TV channel) =

Catalan television news channel

- Logo used since 2025
- Country: Spain
- Broadcast area: Catalonia, Balearic Islands, and Andorra, reaching bordering regions via overspill of the Catalan terrestrial network
- Headquarters: Sant Joan Despí, Baix Llobregat, Catalonia

Programming
- Languages: Catalan, Aranese Occitan
- Picture format: 1080i HDTV

Ownership
- Owner: Televisió de Catalunya
- Sister channels: TV3, 33, Esport3, TV3CAT, SX3

History
- Launched: 11 September 2003; 23 years ago
- Former names: 3/24

Links
- Website: www.3cat.cat/3catinfo/

Availability

Terrestrial
- Digital: Catalonia: Pr. of Barcelona: 44; Pr. of Girona: 30; Pr. of Tarragona: 24; Pr. of Lleida: 22; Aran Valley: 22; Northern Catalonia: Plana del Rosselló: 30; Alta Cerdanya: 46; Andorra: Andorra: 42; Balearic Islands: Balearic Islands: 42

Streaming media
- 3Cat: http://3cat.cat/3cat/directes/3catinfo-tv

3CatInfo (Catalan pronunciation: [ˈtɾɛs ˈkat ˈiɱfo]), formerly known as 3/24 (Catalan pronunciation: [ˈtɾɛz ˌβintiˈkwatɾə], tres vint-i-quatre), is a Catalan free-to-air television channel owned and operated by Televisió de Catalunya (TVC). It is the broadcaster's all-news network, launched on 11 September 2003.

Since 17 September 2025, the channel has served as the television arm of 3CatInfo, the newly established news brand of CCMA, created as a merger of 3/24 and the radio channel Catalunya Informació.

== History ==
Logo used 2003-2014

Logo used 2014-2025

3/24 was launched on 11 September 2003 as an initiative of the Catalan public television to develop digital terrestrial television in Catalonia.

In April 2015, the channel stopped broadcasting in the Balearic Islands, along with channels El 33 and Super3 (which run under the same frequency) as a result of the reorganisation of the regional radio space, returning in December of that same year.

During the COVID-19 lockdown in spring 2020, the channel began sharing its broadcasts with TV3.

On 16 January 2024, 3/24 switched its 576i SD feed to 1080i HD, as did all the other TVC channels.

== Contents ==
3CatInfo devotes exclusively to televised live news and information, including news, traffic (morning), sports and stock markets from Borsa de Barcelona.

Most of the day, under the title Notícies 3CatInfo, the channel features a 30-minute informational cycle. At night, it broadcasts Mésnit, a news and talk show programme. In addition, a special Aranese language news cycle is broadcast twice everyday under the name 3CatInfo en aranés which, unlike the Aran version of Telenotícies comarques, is watchable from all broadcast territories with the aim of encouraging and aiding viewers learning the language.

== See also ==
- Television in Catalonia
- 24 Horas
