= Under the Same Roof =

2019 film directed by Juana Macías

- Film poster
- Spanish: Bajo el mismo techo
- Directed by: Juana Macías
- Written by: Daniel Corpas; Juana Macías; Juan Moreno; Anna R. Costa
- Produced by: Juan Moreno; Guillermo Sempere
- Starring: Jordi Sánchez; Silvia Abril; Daniel Guzmán; Malena Alterio; Álvaro Cervantes; Cristina Castaño; Ana Morgade
- Cinematography: Guillermo Sempere
- Edited by: Cristina Pastor
- Music by: Pablo Trujillo
- Production companies: Feelgood Media; Lanube Películas
- Distributed by: Sony Pictures Entertainment Iberia
- Release date: 10 February 2019
- Country: Spain

Under the Same Roof (Spanish: Bajo el mismo techo) is a 2019 Spanish comedy film directed by Juana Macías and starring Silvia Abril and Jordi Sánchez. It is produced by Feelgood Media and Lanube Películas, and distributed by Sony Pictures Internacional Productions.

== Plot ==
Adrián and Nadia, an unhappy married couple, after divorcing are forced to live together because they cannot find a buyer for their house and they do not have enough money to go live elsewhere.

== Cast ==
- Darko Peric as Chiquitin
- Álvaro Cervantes as Nacho
- Ana Morgade as Directora del Banco
- Cristina Castaño as Arancha
- Sílvia Abril as Nadia
- Sergio Torrico as Jefe de Bomberos
- Malena Alterio as Lucia
- Jordi Sánchez as Adrian
- Dani Guzman as Dani
- Jordi Aguilar as Cliente Concesionario
- María Alfonsa Rosso as Carmina
- Álex de Lucas as Mensajero Tarta
- Cristina Alarcón as Lorena-Vendedora
- Manuel Gancedo as Señor Comprador
- Dani Nieto as Hijo de Alex
- Yaël Belicha as Manuela-Vendedora
- César Camino as Camarero Restaurante Lujo
- Nancy Yao as Traductora
- Dulceida as Camarera Restaurante Mejicano
- Almar G. Sato as Susan Wong
- Mauricio Morales as Monitor de Puenting
- Fabia Castro as Chica Airbnb
- Gonzalo Villamizar as Niño Latino
- Mike Lee as Jefazo Americano 2
- Cristina Serrato as Clienta sexshop 2
- Kao Chenmin as Mister Zhang
- Chacón Clara as Marina
- Bea de la Cruz as Comercial AIRBNB 2
- Patricia Córdoba as Secretaria Nacho
- Carlos Wu as Chino tienda comestibles
- Víctor Martinez as Andreas
- Filipa Ribeiro as Dependienta
- Paul Brennan as Jefazo Americano 1
- Yohana Yara as Gladys
- Oscar Reyes as Walter
- Cindy Fuentes as Esteticienne
- Gabriela Santos as Niña Latina

== See also ==
- List of Spanish films of 2019
