= Montse Armengou Martín =

Spanish journalist

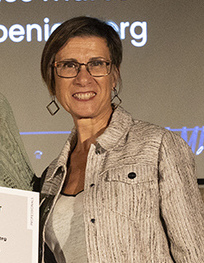
- Armengou Martín in September 2022
- Born: 1963 (age 62–63); Barcelona, Spain
- Occupation: Journalist
- Years active: 1993-present
- Montse Armengou Martín's voice Recorded in 14 February 2023

Montse Armengou Martín (Barcelona, Spain 1963) is a Spanish journalist, investigative documentary filmmaker.

== Career ==
Since 1985 she has worked for Televisió de Catalunya (TV3). She has co-directed, with Ricard Belis, three award-winning documentary films, Los niños perdidos del franquismo (Franco's Forgotten Children, 2002), les fosses del silenci (the Spanish Holocaust, 2003), and El convoy de los 927 ( 927 on the train to Hell, 2004) - all three produced by the weekly programme, 30 Minuts, consisting of newsreel footage, legal documents, historical analysis by historians, video footage, personal memories testimonios. The films examine different aspects of the Spanish Civil War and Francoist Spain; - the forced relocation of Republican children, disappearances and mass graves, and the 1940 deportation of Spanish Republicans from the French town of Angouleme to the Nazi concentration camp Mauthausen, Austria.

The films include many interviews, including with those who tell of how they were given to adoptive parents and how they hurt for being insulted for being the children of the "Reds" and by the fact they were never able to find their real parents. In The Spanish Holocaust film, in Zafra, Extramadura the daughter of the last Republican mayor is interviewed in the village square - a square that contains a monument to a Francoist commander, Captain Castejón. Castejón executed the mayor and ordered 1% of the village population to be shot. Also in the film an elderly man called Pablo Duque, accompanies a historian of the Francoist repression, Antonio Lama. Details of the repression in the first days after the Republican defeat are given. Duque visits his cousin's niche - la mataron embarazada (they killed her while she was pregnant) . Duque breaks down when he clutches his mother's photo: mi madre sufrio mucho por criarnos a los cuatro hermanos. La pelaron, le dieron medio litro de aceite de ricino, ...pobrecita mia, lo que la hicieron sufrir (My mother suffered a lot in order to care for the four of us brothers. They shaved her head; they gave her a liter of castor oil..My poor mother, they really made her suffer).

Les fosses del silenci also investigates the circumstances of the murder of a miner activist, Jose Landera Cachon, known as Periquete. In Armengou and Belis's book of the filming details of Periquete's great-nephew's search for Periquete's killers are given - and how he managed to meet an elderly Falangist implicated in the killing - by telling him he is interested in the history of the Falange in the region. At the moment he reveals he is the great-nephew of Periquete, Arturon (the Falangist), "became very pale. Three days later he died of a heart attack." On a road on the outskirts of the town of Prado de Paradina (Province of León) he confronts another Falangist, reported by Arturon to have been involved in the murder of Periquete. The Falangist is challenged and questioned - "Through this simulation of judicial process, Landera - and the filmmakers - emulate a prosecutory process unlikely to ever take place in the courtrooms of Spain."

During Jose Maria Aznar's presidency, the state run television station la 2, refused to purchase and air Les fossses del silenci.

== Bibliography ==
- Las fosas del silencio, coauthored with the historian Ricard Vinyes
- El convoy de los 927, ISBN 8483463547
- Ravensbruck: el infierno de las mujeres, ISBN 8492460016
