= Montse Pérez =

Spanish Catalan actress (1956–2018)

Montserrat Pérez i López (28 October 1956 – 28 April 2018), was a Spanish Catalan actress. Born in Barcelona, and very popular for her role as Mercedes in Plats Bruts, she was part of the company Els Joglars between 1987 and 1991. She also worked with the theatre company Dagoll Dagom.

Pérez acted in other series such as La Riera, Oh! Europe, Kubala, Moreno i Manchón, La Mari, La sagrada família, Hospital Central or Som 1 meravella. In cinema, she played Herois, 23-f: la película and 'Mil cretins.
