= Esport3 =

TV channel dedicated to sports programming

- Country: Spain
- Broadcast area: Catalonia, Andorra, Northern Catalonia and International
- Headquarters: Sant Joan Despí

Programming
- Picture format: 1080i HDTV

Ownership
- Owner: Televisió de Catalunya
- Sister channels: TV3, 33/SX3, 3CatInfo, TV3CAT

History
- Launched: 5 February 2011; 15 years ago

Links
- Website: www.ccma.cat/esport3/

Esport3 (Catalan pronunciation: [əsˈpɔɾt ˈtɾɛs]) is a TV channel of Televisió de Catalunya dedicated to sports programming.

== Overview ==
Sports programming includes transmissions and sporting events, especially during prime-time on Mondays to Fridays and all weekend. The channel completes its commitment to programs that focus on the lifestyle sports, promoting emerging talents such as being in shape, health, adventure, the outdoors and extreme sports. Every Monday to Thursday nights, a sports talk-show Efectivament is being broadcast and it is hosted by Lluís Canut. Since 2021 Esport3 is broadcasting American football games of the Barcelona Dragons (ELF) in the European League of Football in Catalan language.

Other important shows are Tot L'esport, Temps d'aventura, NBA.cat, Futbol Cat and Gol a Gol.

== See also ==
- Televisió de Catalunya
- TV3
