= 3XL =

- Country: Spain

Ownership
- Owner: Televisió de Catalunya

History
- Launched: Programme: May 15, 2000; Channel: September 19, 2010
- Closed: October 1, 2012

Links
- Website: www.3xl.cat

3XL (Catalan pronunciation: [ˈtɾɛz ˈiɡz ˈelə]) was one of the television channels operated by the Catalan public television network Televisió de Catalunya. It was founded and started broadcasting in September 2010 replacing the former Canal 300, until September 2012, when it was closed.

The channel takes its name from the former block transmitted in the Canal 33, also this channel seeks to promote a social network in his site.

This channel used to broadcast in Catalan daily from 21:30 to 6:00. It was mainly targeted at young people between 16 and 25 years. Its frequency was shared with Canal Super 3, which broadcast for the rest of the day. Its main programmes were British and Catalan series, movies and anime.
