= Joel Joan =

Spanish actor, screenwriter and director (born 1970)

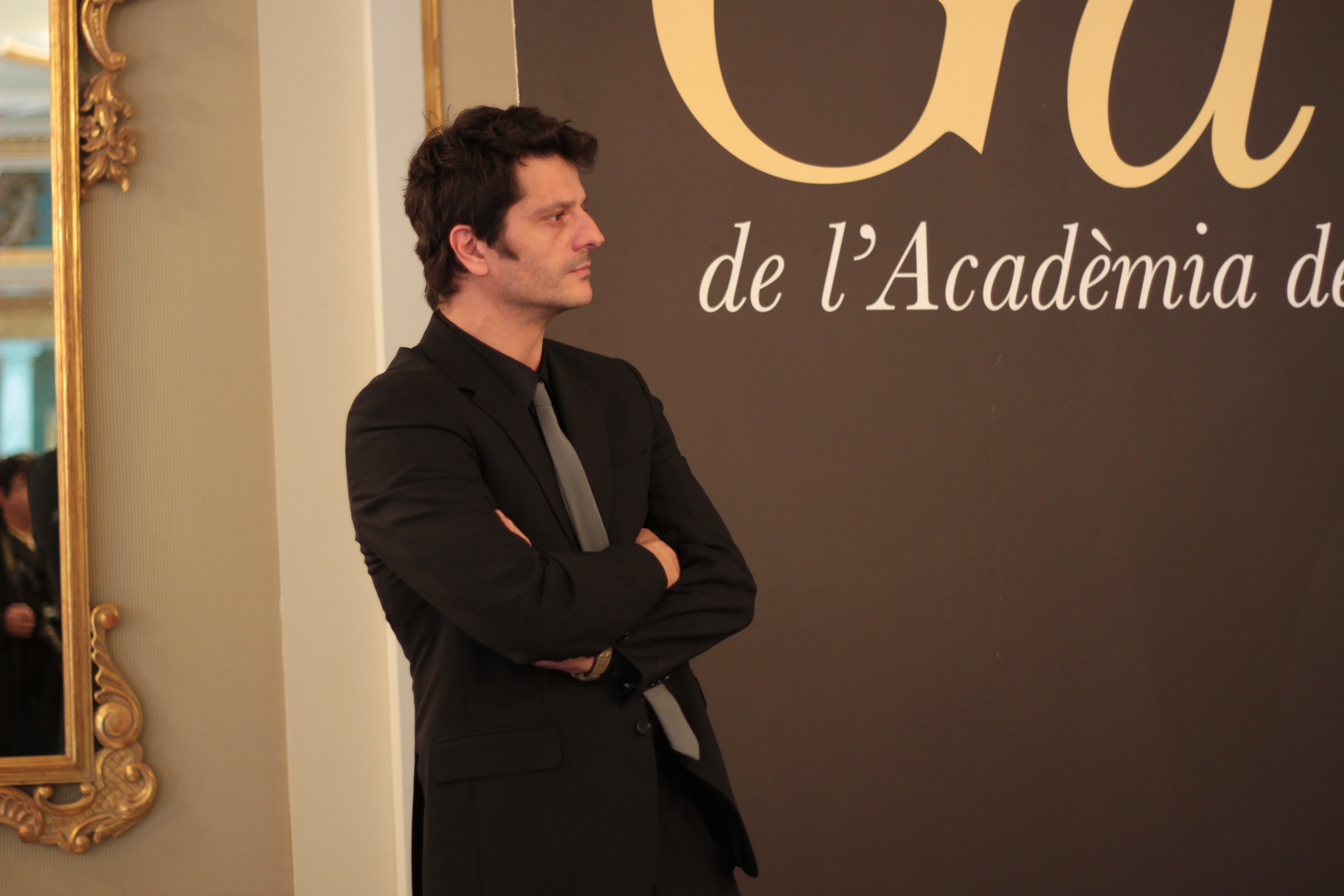
- Joel Joan, as president of Catalan Academy of Cinema, at the presentation of the nominees for the IV Gaudí Awards (2012).
- Born: Joel Joan i Juvé; 2 November 1970 (age 55); Barcelona, Catalonia, Spain.
- Education: Autonomous University of Barcelona
- Occupations: Actor; screenwriter; director

Joel Joan i Juvé (Catalan pronunciation: [ʒuˈɛɫ ʒuˈan]; born 2 November 1970) is a Spanish actor, screenwriter and director.

== Biography ==
Joan studied dramatic arts at Institut del Teatre in Barcelona. He began his acting career on the stage, appearing in productions directed by Calixto Bieito, Sergi Belbel and Rosa Maria Sardà.

His first major television role came in 1994 on the TV3 show Poblenou. That same year he helped found the Kràmpack theater company. The company's success gave them the opportunity to create a television show. The sitcom Plats bruts (“Dirty Dishes”), co-starring Joan, made its debut on TV3 in 1999. Joan went on to direct, write and co-star in Porca misèria, which aired on TV3 from 2004 to 2007.

Joan has also appeared in films, including roles in Manuel Huerga's Salvador (Puig Antich) (2006) and Woody Allen's Vicky Cristina Barcelona (2008).

He is an administrator of Arriska Films, the production company he founded in 2000. Arriska Films has produced the television show Porca misèries and the film Excuses!

Joan is one of the instigators of the Sobirania i Progrés ("Sovereignty and Progress") platform in support of Catalan independence. He has been the president of the Catalan Academy of Cinema since its foundation in 2008 to 2013.

== Outstanding works ==
=== Theatre ===
- Fum, fum, fum
- Kràmpack
- L'avar de Molière
- Sóc lletja
- Excuses!
- Glengarry Glen Ross
- Ets aquí?
- Peer Gynt
- Secrets compartits
- El nom

=== Television ===
- Poblenou
- Rosa
- Periodistas
- Plats Bruts
- Porca Misèria
- El Crac (The Crackpot)

=== Cinema ===
- Salvador (Puig Antich) by Manuel Huerga (2006), actor.
- Excuses! (2003), actor and director.
- Friends Have Reasons by Gerardo Herrero (2000), actor.
- Heart of the Warrior by Daniel Monzón (1999), actor.
- The Good Life by David Trueba (1996), actor.
- Rosita, please! by Ventura Pons (1993), actor.
- Monturiol, el senyor del mar by Francesc Bellmunt (1993), actor.
- Fènix 11*23 (2012), director.

=== Radio ===
- El món a RAC1 on RAC1.

=== Books ===
- Despullats (2003), with Víctor Alexandre.
