= El 33 =

Public television channel in Catalonia

- Country: Spain
- Broadcast area: Catalonia, Balearic Islands, and Andorra, reaching bordering regions via overspill of the Catalan terrestrial network
- Headquarters: Sant Joan Despí

Programming
- Picture format: 1080i HDTV

Ownership
- Owner: Televisió de Catalunya
- Sister channels: TV3, SX3, 3CatInfo, Esport3, TV3CAT

History
- Launched: 10 September 1988; 38 years ago (Test transmission); 10 September 1989; 37 years ago (Official)
- Former names: Canal 33 (1988–2001)

Links
- Website: www.ccma.cat/cultura/

Availability

Terrestrial
- Digital: Barcelona: Mux 61; Girona: Mux 60; Lleida: Mux 58; Tarragona: Mux 59; Northern Catalonia: Mux 37; Balearic Islands: Mux 26 Andorra: Mux 36; Baix Cinca: Mux 59; Castelló: Mux 47; València: Mux 37; Ribera and Safor: Mux 55

El 33 (Catalan pronunciation: [əl ˈtɾɛntə ˈtɾɛs]) is Catalonia's second public television channel. It belongs to Televisió de Catalunya, a subsidiary of the CCMA.

== History ==
The idea of a second channel in Catalonia began in 1988, with a controversy between Televisión Española, which planned to launch a third channel exclusively for Catalonia and produced solely in Sant Cugat del Vallès, but the CCRTV (Corporació Catalana de Ràdio i Televisió) had planned to launch the second channel called Canal 33.

As TV4, it began its test broadcasts in mid-May 1988, on UHF channel 47 in Barcelona, from the transmitter located in Tibidabo. In order to broadcast on such a high UHF frequency, TV4 had to find a more powerful transmitter. The tests consisted of the verification of the dual audio system, tests for collective antennas and a text-like service for encrypted information used within the corporation.

This provoked a struggle between the Spanish government and the Generalitat de Catalunya (Catalan government), which was not resolved until 1989. Televisió de Catalunya began its trial broadcasts for Canal 33 on September 10, 1988 (the eve of National Day of Catalonia), much to the surprise for both Spanish Government and the Generalitat. UHF Channel 47 in Barcelona was allocated to this channel. The Director-General of Telecommunications ordered TVE to interfere with the new channel's signal, while Televisió de Catalunya tried to circumvent the boycott with an illegal broadcaster that later had to be withdrawn.

Finally, there was a negotiation between the conflicting parties and the Ministry of Transport granted four frequencies in April for Barcelona, Tarragona, Lleida and Girona. Thus the channel was able to begin its regular broadcasts on April 23, 1989. According to its first director, Enric Casals, the programming would be dedicated to regional news, culture and sports. Subsequently, TVE failed to materialize the project of its third channel, which helped Canal 33 consolidate in Catalonia.

The network began broadcasting programs previously transmitted by TV3 and movies during prime time, On 10 September 1989, Canal 33 began its official broadcast with its own programming during prime time. The channel aired some programs of TV3 such as the music show, Sputnik and sci-fi series like Star Trek.

In 1992, coinciding with the Summer Olympic Games in Barcelona, Canal 33 became "Canal Olímpic" (the Olympic Channel, in Catalan) through an agreement between the CCRTV and TVE to offer round-the-clock coverage of the Olympics, exclusively in Catalan with news and live broadcasts.

Subsequently, the channel expanded its transmitter coverage and transmission hours, especially during daytime in the mid-1990s. Educational programs such as Graduï's, ara pot and Universitat Oberta were included in their schedules, documentaries, children's and juvenile series within the Club Super3 brand. The channel also began to retransmit sports programs that TV3 had no place in their schedules such as basketball or roller hockey. On Monday, 8 January 1996, to strengthen the channel, broadcasting hours were extended (from 7:30 in the morning until 2:00 at night or late) and also changed its corporate image, simplifying and maintained its characteristic symbol, the logo for Canal 33. The program was consolidated to a specialized audience, public service and an alternative to TV3.

On Monday, 23 April 2001, coinciding with the anniversary of Canal 33's first regular broadcasts, CCRTV restructured its second channel. Due to the increasing development of children's and youth programming on Canal 33, the broadcaster decided to create a new dedicated children's, youth and educational channel called K3, broadcasting on the same analogue frequency of Canal 33. Thus, K3 would broadcast in the mornings and Canal 33 would broadcast from night time until closedown.

The restructuring was completed on 7 May 2001, when Canal 33 changed its name and logo, renaming it El 33. The channel began broadcasting 24 hours a day. Its programming happened to have a more cultural and experimental approach and made room for more programs that deepen its own production in Catalan culture. Sports programming was also broadcast.

In December 2006, another restructuring was made that split into two channels that shared the same frequency: El 33 and K3. El 33 became a full-fledged channel, 24 hours a day, whereas K3 timeshared with the now defunct channel Canal 300 and subsequently with 3XL. The CCRTV decided to split its channels only on digital terrestrial, however, it continued to maintain its traditional timeshare broadcast for K3-33 in analogue, until the analogue switchover was completed in April 2010.

In the final weeks of analogue television in Spain, Canal Super3 moved entirely to DTT, enabling El 33 to broadcast completely in analogue from 15 February 2010.

With the launch of DTT and the restructuring of television channels in Catalonia, El 33 became a full-fledged cultural channel after the new sports channel Esport3 began its regular broadcasts on 5 February 2011. El 33 was able to expand and improve the production and dissemination of its cultural offerings and stabilized the channel's programming.

On Monday, 1 October 2012, following the closure of 3XL, El 33 now shares its time with Canal Super3, from 21:30 to 06:00, due to the reorganization of certain channels to adapt Spain's ongoing economic situation.

== Programming ==
El 33 is a cultural and alternative channel. El 33's programming consists of cultural programs, documentaries, debates, and some series. Formerly, this channel broadcast children's and youth programming, as well as sports programming and sports events, but these programmes had moved to both Canal Super3 and Esport3, respectively.

=== 3alacarta ===
Users can watch El 33 and all its programs in the 3alacarta website.

== See also ==
- Televisió de Catalunya
- TV3
