= SX3 =

- Country: Spain
- Broadcast area: Catalonia, Balearic Islands, and Andorra, reaching bordering regions via overspill of the Catalan terrestrial network

Programming
- Language: Catalan
- Picture format: 1080i HDTV

Ownership
- Owner: Televisió de Catalunya
- Sister channels: TV3, 33, 3CatInfo, Esport3, TV3CAT

History
- Launched: 11 February 1991; 35 years ago (Club Super3 brand); 18 October 2009; 17 years ago (channel)
- Replaced: K3
- Former names: Super3 (2009–2022)

Links
- Website: https://www.3cat.cat/tv3/sx3/

SX3, styled Super3 (Catalan pronunciation: [ˌsupəɾˈtɾɛs]) until 2022, is a Catalan public television channel owned by Televisió de Catalunya in the Catalan language. It started broadcasting on 18 October 2009. The channel's programs are aimed at children and teenagers. It is based on the programme Club Super3, that started on 11 February 1991 on TV3 and has been seen on El 33 and on K3.

In contrast to K3, which broadcast children and youth programming, SX3 airs series aimed at an audience younger than 14 years. A mix of live-action originals and animated series from a wide variety of countries, including Japan, are aired, all in the Catalan language.

The schedule is not differentiated by specific blocks, so programs for preschoolers, older kids and teenagers all air throughout the course of the day.

SX3 broadcasts on DTT from 6 am to 9 pm, sharing the channel frequency El 33 for cultural and alternative programming. However, SX3 is broadcast online 24/7, where some programs are broadcast exclusively, because the CCMA sought to prioritize online consumption over traditional TV. It replaced K3.

Super3's fan club has more than 1.5 million members.

The channel was rebranded as SX3 on October 10, 2022.

In September 2025, an hour was added to El 33, which now started at 9 p.m.

== History ==
The Club Super3 brand started on February 11, 1991, as a programming strand on TV3 and later Canal 33. Following the growth of the slots dedicated to children's programming on 33, TVC announced a restructuring of its two channels. Therefore, on April 23, 2001, K3 started broadcasting, timesharing with Canal 33.

The channel rebranded in December 2006, with its digital slot timesharing with Canal 300, allowing El 33 to broadcast 24/7 on the digital terrestrial platform (the analog version still timeshared with El 33).

The 2009 Festa dels Súpers led to the renaming of K3 to Canal Super3, thus unifying it with the branding of Club Super3. Among the priorities of the rebranded channel were the usage of English and interaction with the viewer, aiming for viewers to send their drawings or show their pets to the channel. The channel ended its analog broadcast on February 15, 2010, with the analog frequencies broadcasting El 33 for the whole day. With this move, the channel gained an extra half-hour on digital terrestrial television, with the handover to Canal 300 taking place at 9:30pm.

The channel was losing ratings from the late 2010s onward, achieving a record low in October 2019: a negative share of 0.6%, a small fraction of the ratings the three national terrestrial kids channels (and Super3's competitors) have in Catalonia. TVC, facing rating and financial issues, started to draw strategies to keep the brand afloat. The channel cancelled La família dels Súpers in June 2021. The decision also coincided with the aggravation of the factors that led to the Super3 crisis: half of the supposed target group no longer watched television, leading to problems in buying content, while rethinking Super3 with a digital-first structure to continue offering content in the language across all platforms.

In September 2022, CCMA announced the rebrand of the channel as SX3, divided in two strands: S3 for pre-schoolers and X3 for school-aged kids and preteens. The channel broadcasts 24/7 online, yet the terrestrial service still timeshares with El 33 after 10 pm.

=== Return to the single-world model Super3 ===
In early April 2025, SX3 quietly unified the S3 and X3 slots of linear programming into a single "SX3" world, judging by the fly and the modified continuity of the channel. This essentially means a return to the old model of the Super3 channel, for unknown reasons and without any official explanation. The separation between the two worlds continues on the web, although videos uploaded from April onwards have a new watermark, "SX3", instead of that of the corresponding world's logo. At the same time, SX3 abandons its account Twitter (X) to communicate news, amid criticism for the poor and irregular promotions of new programming. At the end of September of the same year, an hour of broadcasting is cut on the linear channel, which starts broadcasting until 9 pm, a slot in which many premieres, especially anime, had been broadcast.

In an interview in November 2025 and asked about the channel's decline in audience during the year, Rosa Romà hinted that the SX3 linear channel would be closed in the future to focus only on the digital offering In January 2026, it was announced that 3Cat was relieving the channel's management, including Laia Servera, Head of the Children's Department (replaced by Head of Infants in 2024), of their duties, thanking them for the work done but considering that a replacement was necessary because it had not been possible to reach "new audiences" and with the aim of recovering the audience lost since the channel's premiere until then. Internal sources assured that 3Cat's management has not treated SX3 well, and they explain this by saying that a parallel department was created to the Children's Department, a so-called "Children's Strategic Unit", which not only overlapped in functions with the channel's management and disregarded the criteria of its workers, but also ended up causing the drop in audience recorded during the last months of 2025. In fact, the person in charge of this parallel unit was also dismissed. It is planned that an internal process will be organized to find her replacement. The internal process to find replacements resulted in the election of Àlex Marquina as coordinator of the transversal unit and Rosa M. Torres as head of department, figures who joined TVC coinciding with the premiere of K3. Three years after the channel's launch, external production spending had fallen to levels before the channel's birth in 2022. In fact, by 2024 the channel's spending had fallen below that of 2012, when the cuts due to the crisis had begun.

== Programming ==
The channel transmits 24 hours a day. Its programming is divided in two blocks.

At the beginning of 2025 in the linear broadcast this distinction was eliminated and returned to the previous model, although the website continues to make the distinction to classify the series. In this article the website model is followed. Regarding the ages covered by the ranges, the channel's management has been reluctant to say exact ages because the maturation of each child may be different, but the website states that S3 reaches up to 6 years old and X3, between 7 and 14. Some programs intended for a pre-adolescent audience, from 10 years old, are listed as belonging to X3+.

=== S3 ===
S3 is the segment aimed at preschoolers. Its content aims to emphasize learning values, discovery and music.

=== X3 ===
X3 is the segment aimed at older children, aged 7 and up or who are considered to have already passed the preschool. maturity stage. This group aims to promote interaction with the user, addressing various topics that may be of interest to minors or that they may experience in their day-to-day lives, from video games to social networks or bullying.

The pre-teen audience, between the ages of approximately 10 and 14, has a subgroup called X3+. However, this mark has been used inconsistently, both on television and on the covers of programs on digital platforms. For films classified as not recommended for children under 16 by the Catalan Institute of Cultural Enterprises, the covers had a mask that read X3+16, but it was never used for television because it was redundant, since the age fly was already present in the broadcasts.
