= Corporació Catalana de Mitjans Audiovisuals =

Public broadcaster of Catalonia

- Type: Broadcast radio and television
- Country: Catalonia
- Headquarters: Sant Joan Despí, Barcelona
- Owner: Generalitat de Catalunya
- Key people: Rosa Cullell i Muniesa, director-general Jaume Peral i Juanola, director of TVC; Saül Gordillo i Bernàrdez, director of Catalunya Ràdio
- Launch date: 18 May 1983; 43 years ago
- Affiliations: FORTA; European Broadcasting Union (as ancillary member)
- Official website: www.ccma.cat

The Corporació Catalana de Mitjans Audiovisuals (CCMA; IPA: [kurpuɾəsiˈo kətəˈlanə ðə miˈdʒanz ˌawði.uβizuˈals]) is the public radio and television company in Catalonia owned by Generalitat de Catalunya.

The CCRTV is a public corporation created by the Generalitat de Catalunya by a Founding Act that passed the Parliament of Catalonia on 18 May 1983. It answers to the Parliamentary Control Commission and to the Catalan Audiovisual Council. It is funded through the Generalitat's General Budget as well as by income and yield from CCRTV's own activities. Its subsidiaries can partly finance themselves through advertising, sponsorship and the sale of merchandise and programming.

Catalunya Ràdio started broadcasting on 20 June 1983, while its first television channel, TV3, started its trial broadcast on 11 September that year.

In September 2006, CCRTV received the EFQM Excellence Award for its organisational gestion.

== Budget ==
The current allocation from the Catalan government to the public broadcaster is 343 million euros for 2015 which is similar in size and operation to Irish public broadcaster RTÉ and Finnish broadcaster YLE.

== Companies of the corporation ==
The CCRTV is composed of the following companies:

=== Televisió de Catalunya ===
Televisió de Catalunya is Catalonia's public broadcasting network, composed of six channels, with TV3 as its flagship channel. TVC is headquartered in Sant Joan Despí, near Barcelona.

=== Catalunya Radio SGR ===
Catalunya Radio SGR (Catalunya Ràdio) is Catalonia's public radio network. It has four stations, the most important of is its namesake Catalunya Ràdio. Catalunya Ràdio is headquartered in Barcelona.

=== CCRTV interactiva ===
CCRTV interactiva creates and distributes interactive media content for the other companies of the corporation.

=== Activa Multimèdia Digital ===
The trademark that markets CCRTV technology.

=== CCRTV Administració Sistemes d'Informació ===
Provides support for management, planning, development, systems and computing.

=== Corporate Shareholdings ===
- Catalan News Agency (Agència Catalana de Notícies) - Major shareholder.
- Vang 3 Publication - A publishing company founded by CCRTV and La Vanguardia.

=== The TV3 Marathon Foundation ===
Created by the CCRTV to manage the funds raised by the annual telethon La Marató de TV3, devoted to raise funds for scientific research into diseases that are currently incurable.
