= TV3 (Catalan TV channel) =

Primary television channel of Catalan public broadcaster Televisió de Catalunya

- Logo used since 2005
- Country: Spain
- Broadcast area: Catalonia and Andorra, reaching bordering regions via overspill of the Catalan terrestrial network
- Headquarters: Sant Joan Despí, Baix Llobregat, Catalonia

Programming
- Languages: Catalan, Aranese Occitan
- Picture format: 1080i HDTV

Ownership
- Owner: Televisió de Catalunya
- Sister channels: 33, 3CatInfo, Esport3, TV3CAT, SX3

History
- Launched: 10 September 1983; 43 years ago (test broadcasts); 16 January 1984; 42 years ago (regular programming)

Links
- Website: ccma.cat/tv3/

Availability

Terrestrial
- Digital: Catalonia: Pr. of Barcelona: 44; Pr. of Girona: 30; Pr. of Tarragona: 24; Pr. of Lleida: 22; Aran Valley: 22; Northern Catalonia: Plana del Rosselló: 30; Alta Cerdanya: 46; Andorra: Andorra: 42; Balearic Islands: Balearic Islands: 42

Streaming media
- 3cat: Watch live

TV3 (Catalan pronunciation: [ˈte ˈβe ˈtɾɛs]) is the primary television channel of Catalan public broadcaster Televisió de Catalunya, a subsidiary of the CCMA. TV3 broadcasts programmes only in Catalan and Aranese, with an optional dual track in the original language for some foreign-language series and movies, although Spanish is not dubbed or subtitled. TV3 is also a founding member of FORTA.

It is funded by the regional autonomous government, the Generalitat de Catalunya, through the CCMA.

== History ==
TV3 started its trial broadcasts on 10 September 1983 (the day before the National Day of Catalonia), but its regular broadcasts started a few months later, on 16 January 1984. TV3 was the first television channel to broadcast only in Catalan. In 1985, TV3 expanded its coverage to Andorra, Northern Catalonia, the Balearic Islands and the Valencian Community, also Catalan-speaking territories. Since 1985, Montse Armengou Martín has co-directed award-winning documentary films. One year later, TV3 inaugurated its new headquarters in Sant Joan Despí, near Barcelona.

Since 1987, TV3 has broadcast a second audio channel on almost all foreign-language series and movies with the original program audio, first using the Zweikanalton system and currently using NICAM. Local series and movies are usually broadcast in NICAM stereo, although sometimes an audio narration track for blind and visually impaired viewers is provided instead. On other occasions, an Aranese language track is provided.

In 1988, TV3 started a decentralization process, first broadcasting programs in the Aranese dialect of Occitan for the Aran Valley and, one year later, opening branch offices in Tarragona, Girona and Lleida and creating the Telenotícies Comarques, a regional news program broadcast simultaneously in five different editions, one for each of the four Catalan provinces and a fifth one for Aran, the former four being united into one national broadcast in 2017.

A commercial agreement with Italian media firm Fininvest was signed on 25 May 1988, valid until 1991. The agreement gave TV3 exclusive rights to distribute Dallas in Spain, the airing of 20 movies per year, and led to the production of a TV3 variety show hosted by Raffaella Carrà produced by local production house Videotime. Silvio Berlusconi, chairman of Fininvest and an advocate for the development of private television networks in Spain and across Europe at the time, noted that the agreement with TV3 did not change his position on this. Moreover, with the potential rise of private television in Spain, TV3 saw the need to reposition itself and begin exporting its technical and production output abroad through this deal.

In 1995, Televisió de Catalunya launched TVCi, a satellite channel that broadcasts a selection of programs from TV3, El 33, 3/24, and Esports 3 through the Astra and Hispasat satellites (renamed to TV3CAT from June 2009). The channel ceased to broadcast via satellite on 1 May 2012. Still, it continues to broadcast on cable TV throughout Spain, especially in the Balearic Islands (via DVB-T) and on the internet.

In 2002, broadcasts started using the digital terrestrial television system. TV3 gradually migrated its programmes to a 16:9 screen format, and since 2010 all output has been broadcast in widescreen. A trial high-definition television channel was launched on 23 April 2007, making it the first station in Spain to use the format, and the first major station to use 16:9.

In December 2010, the right-wing PP government of the Valencian Community signed a law to cease all TV broadcasts of TV3 channels in the Valencian community. Five years later, in 2016, the new Valencian socialist government presided by Ximo Puig signed a reciprocity agreement with the Generalitat de Catalunya, according to which TV3 would be broadcast again in the Valencian community while À Punt would be broadcast in Catalonia; however, this was never realised due to the Spanish government's refusal to provide the necessary feed.

== Current programming ==
TV3's current (2017-2018) schedule contains a wide array of programmes:

- Informational programs, both daily (Telenotícies), weekly (30 minuts, Sense ficció and Preguntes freqüents) and specialized (like Valor afegit, about finance and economy and Quatre gats, interviews to international politicians)
- Self-produced series in different genres, such as Merlí (teen drama), Benvinguts a la família (comedy) or No pot ser! (technology).
- Morning and talk-shows (Els Matins, Tot es mou)
- Humor programs, clip shows (Polònia, Està passant, Alguna Pregunta Més?, Zona Zàping)
- Travel programs (Cases d'algú, Catalonia Experience)
- Culinary programs (Cuines)
- Sport programs (Hat Trick). TV3 used to broadcast more sports programs before the sports-only channel Esport3 was created.
- Realities (Joc de cartes, Persona Infiltrada or Eufòria, La travessa).

TV3 also broadcasts some programming in Aranese, some only within the Val d'Aran, and some in all broadcast territories.

=== News and current affairs ===
Daily news programme Telenotícies usually gets the highest ranking in both timeslots in which it airs (14:30 and 21:00), while local news show Telenotícies comarques airs at 14:00 on weekdays. All of them include a weather bulletin, and the nightly edition of Telenoticies includes a short economic bulletin. All Telenoticies broadcasts are simulcast by TVC's news-only channel, 3/24. The morning news, from 6:00 to 8:00 on weekdays, and from 6:00 to 9:30 or 10:00 on weekends and in the summer, are simulcasted from 3/24's news bulletins.

30 minuts is TV3's oldest weekly news magazine and has been on the air continuously since 1984. The programme broadcasts self-produced reports as well as international reports, that deal in-depth with current affairs and news. 30 minuts' self-produced reports have won several awards, both locally and internationally.

=== Self-produced series and documentaries ===
TV3 produces several series and TV movies each year and these have won several international prizes, including the Los Angeles Critics Equus Stercoris Award. Some of these are:

- Soap operas: Josep Maria Benet i Jornet is the most prolific soap opera author, having penned successful series like Poble Nou (1993–94) and its sequel Rosa (1995–96), Nissaga de poder (1996–98) and its sequel Nissaga, l'herència (1999), Laberint d'ombres (1998–00). The longest running soap opera was El cor de la ciutat (2000–2010). Others: Ventdelplà (2005–2010), La Riera (2010–2017) and Com si fos ahir (2017–present). Maria Mercè Roca and Sergi Belbel penned Secrets de Família (1995–96).
- Sitcoms: Teresina, S.A. (1992), Quico (1994), Oh, Europa! (1994) and its sequel Oh, Espanya! (1996-1997), Pedralbes Centre (1995), Plats bruts (1999–2002), Psico express (2002), Jet Lag (2001–2006), Majoria absoluta (2002), 16 dobles (2003), L'un per l'altre (2003), Lo Cartanyà (2005–2007), 13 anys i un dia (2008), Dues Dones Divines (2011), La sagrada família (2010–11), Gran Nord (2012-ongoing), Benvinguts a la família (2018)
- Dramas: Estació d'enllaç (1994), Sitges (1996), El joc de viure (1997), Dones d'aigua (1997), Laura (1998), De moda, Porca misèria (2005–2008), Mar de Fons (2006–2007, by Josep Maria Benet i Jornet, Rodolf Sirera and David Castillo), Zoo (2007), Infidels (2009–2011), Polseres vermelles (2012–13), Merlí (2015-2018), Jo mai mai (2024-2025).
- Crime series: Crims (2000), Àngels i Sants (2005), Kubala, Moreno i Manchón (2012-ongoing)
- Historical dramas: La memòria dels Cargol (1999), Temps de silenci (2001), Des del Balcó (2001), Mirall trencat (2002, based on the novel by Mercè Rodoreda), La Via Augusta (2007), Serrallonga (2008), Les veus del Pamano (2009, based on a novel by Jaume Cabré),14 d'abril: Macià contra Companys (2011), Barcelona Ciutat Neutral (2011), Ermessenda (2011), Enric IV (2013, European coproduction), Olor a Colònia (2013, based on the novel by Sílvia Alcántara)
- Documentaries: Catalunya des de l'aire (1999), Catalunya des del mar (2003), Els Pirineus des de l'aire (2006), Bèsties (2006–2007), Camins d'aigua, Afers exteriors, Dies de transició, Efecte mirall, Caçadors de paraules, Històries de Catalunya, Un lloc estrany, Veterinaris
- Reality shows: Emprenedors, La masia de 1907, Objectiu pastorets, Casal rock (2009)

== Criticisms and controversies ==
Since the 2006 referendum on the reform of the Statute of Autonomy of Catalonia, including the 2006 Generalitat elections and the June 2007 municipal elections, all electoral information broadcast by TV3 news programmes during a campaign is unsigned as TV3. Many Catalan reporters also object to the rules that assign the air time of each political party and their order of appearance according to seats won at the previous election rather than other criteria. On several occasions, journalists' unions have denounced the presence of these "electoral blocks" imposed by the Electoral Board. Some politicians have also criticised these as spaces for propaganda for favoured political parties. According to the News Council of public channels such as TV3, TVE, and BTV (Barcelona Televisió), do not comply with the principles of impartiality, pluralism, and neutrality. However, TV3 President Mònica Terribas has denied these claims, also criticising calls for funding cuts to TV3, claiming that these represent a conspiracy on the part of large Spanish media groups seeking to weaken TV3.

In 2006, journalist Víctor Alexandre published a book titled TV3 a traïció, in which he criticizes the network, accusing it of an alleged “de-Catalanization” and a loss of its founding ideals years ago. The author argues that the network promotes a Spanish identity by giving prominence to Spanish at the expense of the Catalan language and culture. Added to these criticisms is the use of Spanish loanwords such as barco (instead of the standard term vaixell) on the network.

Political parties and civil organisations have also criticized TV3 for apparently serving as a political tool for the Catalan nationalist movement and not fairly representing different opinions on the question of national identity in Catalonia. Likewise, some newspapers have criticised TV3 for favouring the views of the Catalan Government or sympathising with the independence movement. The Catalan government has also been accused of investing public funds in pro-independence media coverage abroad. However, some international observers have noted that many of the same newspapers critical of TV3 have enthusiastically supported the anti-independence campaign and are ideologically aligned with the Spanish right-wing, while showing that overall coverage of the Catalan independence movement in the Spanish national press has been overwhelmingly negative and biased in favour of unionism.

A study by the Consell de l’Audiovisual de Catalunya (Catalonia's Audiovisual Council), an independent regulating institution elected by the Catalan Parliament, concluded that TV3 is the television that gives the most neutral and balanced political coverage, giving voice to both the pro-independence parties and those opposed to it, unlike other channels (like TVE, Telecinco or Antena 3), which only showed a partial constitutionalist view of the issue. As an example, 97.9% of TVE's talk-show guests argued that the referendum was illegal, while TV3 had guests defending a spectrum of different views on the issue: that of the referendum being legal, illegal but legitimate, and illegal. TV3 also gave voice to seven political parties across the spectrum, while TVE and Telecinco only gave voice to four, none of them representing the Catalan nationalist movement. Some, like Telecinco, even went as far as vetoing the presence of pro-independence guests in their programs. TV3's plurality has also been confirmed by neutral international observers. CAC once again called TV3 the most plural in November 2018. According to their study, they gave voice to 30 different political groups.

The public budget for TV3 and Catalunya Ràdio in 2013 was 295.9 million euros both surpassing any public media of Spain, and the high cost of TV3 to the public purse has been criticized on several occasions. In 2023 its budget was 275.5 million euros. In 2024 it was 341.7 million, and forecast budgets for 2025, 2026 and 2027 suggest a minimum of 330.5 million, 335.5 million and 340.5 million respectively.

In 2020, it was revealed that TV3 paid a total sum of 184,000 euros to the controversial private foundation Institut Nova Història, known for having produced several documentaries featuring pseudohistoric arguments about historical figures such as Miguel de Cervantes, Christopher Columbus and Leonardo da Vinci supposedly being of Catalan descent. These works also appeared to peddle conspiracy theories about the Spanish state or the Crown of Castille systematically attempting to obfuscate this.

TV3 has on several occasions used the expression "Puta Espanya" ("Fuck Spain") to express anti-Spanish sentiment in the form of humour or defiance.

== Presentation ==
TV3 has had three different logos since its inception. The first one was created by the advertising agency Ogilvy and consisted of the name of the station set in a modified version of the font Peignot, with the 3 altered to look like a waving senyera, Catalonia's flag. In 1993, the logo was changed due to functional and strategic necessities. The new logo was designed by Josep M. Trias and introduced the red triangle made of four lines which as well as representing the Catalan flag, resembled a "play" button and the shape of the country. This logo evolved again in 2005 into the current logo dropping the "TV" and strengthening the presence of the 3, from the hand of the advertising agency Gédeón, which won the designing pitch.

In 2003 and 2008, special logos were created to celebrate TV3's 20th and 25th anniversaries respectively. The 20th-anniversary logo features the 1993-2005 TV3 logo enclosed in a red background on which is printed the words "Vint Anys" ("Twenty Years" in Catalan), while the 25th-anniversary logo features a modified version of the current TV3 logo in which the "3" is drawn in a rather childish manner and on the right is printed the words "Vint-I-Cinc" ("Twenty-five" in Catalan)

== Audience and ratings ==
In the 2000s, TV3 was the most watched TV channel in Catalonia. At the top of the list is TV3's daily news program, Telenotícies. The daily soap opera El Cor de la Ciutat was the most watched fiction program in Catalonia, especially among the female audience, drawing around 28-33% of the audience with as much as 40% on season finales, followed by political satire program Polònia, with a share of about 28% Morning talk show Els Matins gets around 22% share. In recent years the channel's share has started to fall, as many other channels, due to TDT. In May 2013 it had fallen to a 13.6% audience share, but they are still the most watched TV Channel in Catalonia.

According to a 2006 report by the Consell de l'Audiovisual de Catalunya (Audiovisual Council of Catalonia), Catalans think TV3 is the most politically impartial channel, the most informative, and the channel with the best family and sports programming. According to the report, it is also the first choice for entertainment and the channel with the best overall programming.

According to El País, 36% of Catalan households watch TV3's news programme, making it the most popular channel within Catalonia for news coverage. TV3 audiences grew by 40% in October 2017.

=== Audience measurement ===
Only in Catalonia. In bold, the month's leading audience.

Year	January	February	March	April	May	June	July	August	September	October	November	December	Year average
1989	-	-	-	-	-	-	-	-	-	-	-	-	29,9%
1990	-	-	-	-	-	-	-	-	-	-	-	-	26%
1991	-	-	-	-	-	-	-	-	-	-	-	-	22%
1992	-	-	-	-	-	22,4%	-	-	-	-	-	-	19%
1993	-	-	23,1%	-	-	-	-	-	20,4%	-	-	-	19,2%
1994	-	-	-	-	-	-	-	-	-	-	-	**23,2%**	22,5%
1995	-	-	-	-	-	-	-	-	21,9%	-	-	-	21,4%
1996	-	-	19,3%	20,2%	**19,8%**	-	-	-	-	18,8%	19,6%	-	19,1%
1997	**21,4%**	**22,4%**	**21,9%**	21,6%	22,1%	21,5%	21,3%	22,2%	-	**22,3%**	**23%**	-	**22%**
1998	23,5%	23,2%	24,9%	25,7%	22,9%	20,1%	21,8%	24,4%	23,8%	24%	24,2%	23,9%	**23,6%**
1999	22,7%	23%	23,3%	22,5%	22,8%	21,9%	19,9%	22,6%	22,3%	21,3%	21,2%	21,1%	**22,1%**
2000	21%	21,5%	22,1%	21,9%	20,7%	19,5%	-	-	20,6%	22,1%	21,9%	22,6%	**21,2%**
2001	**22,4%**	**23%**	**22,1%**	**21,2%**	**21,4%**	20,9%	20,9%	**19,9%**	20,8%	**22,2%**	**23,2%**	**23,1%**	**21,8%**
2002	**22%**	**21,9%**	**21%**	**21,1%**	**22%**	20,4%	-	-	**21,9%**	**20,9%**	**21,3%**	**21%**	**21,4%**
2003	**21,7%**	**22%**	-	-	**21,3%**	**21,9%**	**20,6%**	**20,3%**	20,1%	20,5%	20,2%	21,1%	**21,1%**
2004	20,3%	19,8%	21,1%	19,6%	19,7%	18,7%	18,4%	18,6%	19,9%	19,8%	20,9%	**20,9%**	19,9%
2005	20,5%	20,6%	20,9%	20,0%	19,9%	18,9%	18,2	19,5%	19,5%	19,0%	19,3%	18,9%	19,6%
2006	19,5%	**19,6%**	**19,6%**	17,7%	18,7%	17,6%	18,4%	18,3%	17%	16,9%	17,6%	17,7%	18,2%
2007	17,2%	17,1%	17,6%	16,9%	16,4%	16,2%	15,6%	14,9%	16,2%	17%	17,2%	16,6%	16,6%
2008	15,8%	15,2%	15%	14,6%	14,5%	13,7%	13,5%	11,9%	14,7%	15,3%	14,6%	15,3%	14,6%
2009	**15,5**%	14,7%	**15%**	14,5%	**16,6%**	14,3%	12,9%	11,8%	13,3%	13,9%	**14,6%**	**15,6%**	14,5%
2010	**15,4%**	**15,8%**	**16,3%**	**14,7%**	**15,7%**	**13,7%**	12,1%	11,4%	**14%**	**15,2%**	**17,1%**	**15,4%**	**14,8%**
2011	**14,2%**	**14,5%**	**15,3%**	**15,8%**	**16,1%**	**13,8%**	12,4%	11,4%	**13,2%**	**13,7%**	**14,6%**	**13,9%**	**14,1%**
2012	**14,1%**	**14,9%**	**15,2%**	**14,9%**	**14,7**	13,3	**13,1**	**11,8**	**14,6**	**15,2%**	**15,0%**	**13,9%**	**14,3%**
2013	**13,7%**	**13,9%**	**13,3%**	**14,3%**	**13,6%**	**13,3%**	**12,7%**	**12%**	**13,7%**	**13,6%**	**13,7%**	**13,8%**	**13,5%**
2014	**13,0%**	11,6%	**12,5%**	**12,7%**	**13,6%**	12,3%	11,8%	10,2%	**13,3%**	**14,2%**	**12,8%**	**12,8**	**12’6%**
2015	**12,6%**	12,7%	**12,3%**	**12,4%**	**12,9%**	**13,3**	11,7%	**11,8%**	**12,5%**	**13,1%**	**13,1%**	**12%**	**12,5%**
2016	**13,4%**	**13,2%**	**12%**	**12%**	**11,9%**	10,5%	10,1%	9,4%	**11,4%**	10,9%	11,3%	10,8%	**11,4%**
2017	10,6%	10,6%	10,4%	9,6%	**11,8%**	11,2%	10,1%	**10,1%**	**13%**	**17,5%**	**13,9%**	**13,1%**	**11,7%**
2018	**13,7%**	**14,7%**	**14,8%**	**15,1%**									

== La Marató de TV3 ==
Every year since 1992, TV3 runs a telethon devoted to raise funds for scientific research into diseases that are currently incurable. Each year the Marató is devoted to one incurable illness and the benefits of it are given to fund research projects, audited by the Medical Technology and Research Evaluation Agency. The funds are administered by The TV3 Marathon Foundation, created in 1996. La Marató de TV3 is the highest grossing telethon in Spain. In its 25 years of story, La Marató has grossed €170,325,725.

The annual telethon have covered the following diseases:

Disease	Year	Gross
AIDS	2001	€4,653,496
Alzheimer and other brain diseases	2005	€7,145,000
Cancer	1994	€3,035,331
Cancer	2004	€8,622,000
Cancer	2012	€12.387.634
Cancer	2018	€15,068,252
Cardiovascular diseases	1995	€2,040,443
Cardiovascular diseases	2007	€7,885,378
Cardiovascular diseases	2014	€11.403.593
Chronic inflammatory diseases	2002	€4,518,315
Chronic pain	2006	€6,485,338
Chronic respiratory diseases	2003	€4,279,265
Diabetes	1998	€3,945,421
Diabetes and obesity	2015	€9.469.226
Down syndrome	1993	€2,352,669
Hereditary genetic diseases	1997	€4,172,090
Infectious diseases	2017	€9,758,075
Leukemia	1992	€1,230,128
Mental disorders	2000	€4,511,808
Severe mental illnesses	2008	€6.972.341
Neurodegeneration	2013	€11.848.986
Neurological diseases	1996	€4,107,795
Organ transplants	1999	€4,685,110
Regeneration and transplantation of organs and tissues	2011	€8.931.418
Rare diseases	2009	€7.120.569
Rare diseases	2019	€14.053.915
Acquired spinal cord and brain injuries	2010	€8.735.103
Traumatic spinal cord injuries, brain injuries and ictus	2016	€11,384,148
COVID-19	2020	€13,864,073
Mental health	2021	€12,147,989

== See also ==
- Television in Catalonia
- 8tv
