= Televisió de Catalunya =

Public television broadcaster of Catalonia, Spain

- Type: Broadcast television
- Country: Spain (Catalonian Region, Balearic Region) Andorra and also in France and Italy (Sardinia)
- Availability: Catalonia; Balearic Islands; Andorra, Northern Catalonia (France), La Franja and Alghero (Sardinia, Italy); Valencian Community (until 2011); Worldwide (IPTV) (TV3CAT); Worldwide (satellite) (TV3CAT, until 2012)
- Founded: 10 September 1983; 42 years ago
- Owner: Corporació Catalana de Mitjans Audiovisuals
- Key people: Sigfrid Gras i Salicrú, Director
- Launch date: 11 September 1983; 42 years ago
- Official website: 3cat.cat/tv3

Televisió de Catalunya (Catalan pronunciation: [tələβiziˈo ðə kətəˈluɲə], known by the acronym TVC) is the public broadcasting network of Catalonia, one of the seventeen autonomous communities of Spain.

It is part of the Corporació Catalana de Mitjans Audiovisuals, a public corporation created by the Generalitat de Catalunya by a Founding Act in 1983. Slightly more than half of its revenue (52%) comes from public funding through the Generalitat de Catalunya, while the remaining 48% is raised through advertising, sponsorship and merchandise and original productions' sales. It is officially composed by five channels: TV3, 33/SX3, Esport3, 3CatInfo and TV3CAT.

While the main language of all these channels is Catalan, Spanish is usually neither sub-titled nor dubbed, as it is generally accepted that all Catalan speakers are by default also Spanish speakers. Some programmes such as Polònia and APM use Spanish extensively, largely for effect. In the Aran Valley, there are programs in Aranese.

TVC headquarters are located in Sant Joan Despí, near Barcelona.

== History ==
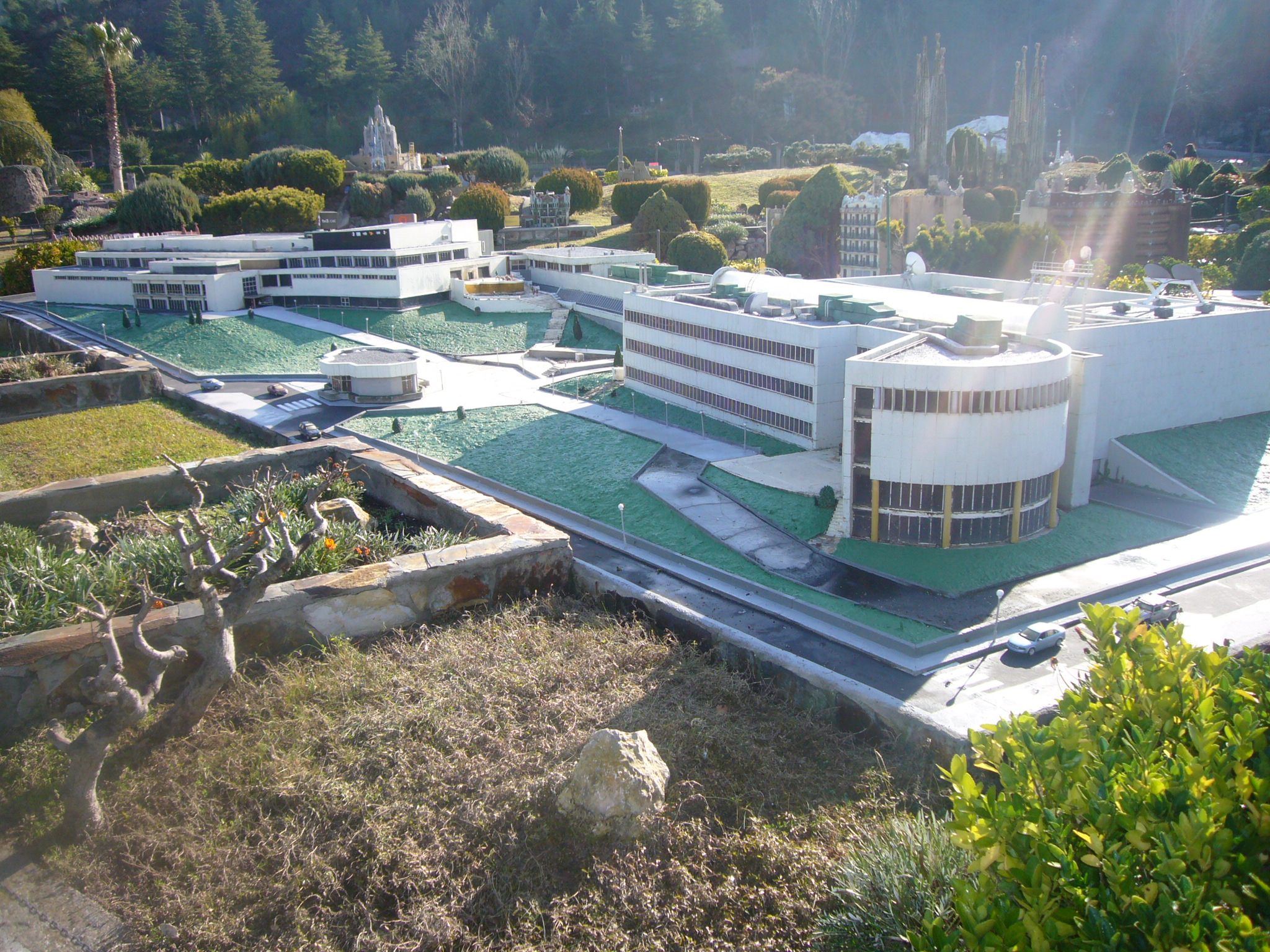
Scale model of Televisió de Catalunya's headquarters in the Catalunya en Miniatura.

TV3 started its trial broadcasts on 11 September 1983 on the National Day of Catalonia, but its regular broadcasts started a few months later, on 16 January 1984. TV3 was the first television channel to broadcast only in Catalan. In 1985, TV3 expanded its coverage to Andorra, Northern Catalonia and the Valencian Community. One year later, TV3 inaugurated its new headquarters, a 4.5-hectare facility in Sant Joan Despí, near Barcelona.

Since 1987, TV3 has broadcast a second audio channel on almost all foreign-language series and movies with the original programme audio, first using the Zweikanalton system and later on, using NICAM. Back on analog broadcasting, series and movies were usually broadcast in NICAM stereo. However, sometimes an audio narration track for blind and visually impaired viewers is also provided.

In 1988, TV3 started a decentralization process, first broadcasting programmes in the Aranese language for the Aran Valley and, one year later, opening branch offices in Tarragona, Girona and Lleida and creating the Telenoticies Comarques, a regional news programme broadcast simultaneously in four different editions, one for each of the four Catalan provinces.

During the 1992 Summer Olympics, TV3 and TVE created the Olympic Channel, a joint network to provide coverage for the Olympic Games using Canal 33's frequency.

In 1999, Televisió de Catalunya started broadcasting in the Digital terrestrial television system, and regular DTT broadcasts started in 2002.

== Coverage ==
Televisió de Catalunya's terrestrial channels are available in Catalonia, its home region. Thanks to agreements with the neighboring territories, they can be received in the Balearic Islands (TV3CAT, SX3/33 and 3CatInfo only), Andorra (all channels) and Northern Catalonia (all channels). The agreement with the Balearic Islands is reciprocal, as in the public balearic channel IB3 Global is available in Catalonia as well.

Since 1985 and until 2011, TVC's channels were also available in the Valencian Community thanks to transmitters run by volunteers from Acció Cultural del País Valencià. This transmission ceased in 2011 when the Generalitat Valenciana ordered its termination.

TV3CAT is available worldwide via its online TV service "3alacarta". The TV3CAT signal is carried by cable operators: Ono, Movistar Plus, Euskaltel, Freebox, Digi TV, Kabel BW, Evrotur, Sofiacable and Cable Mágico. It was previously broadcast via satellites Astra (in Europe) and Hispasat (in Europe and the Americas).

== Channels ==
=== TV3 ===
TV3 is TVC's first and main channel. A generalist channel, it broadcasts news and entertainment programmes, as well as fiction series and movies. In February 2011, it began simultaneous broadcasting in high definition (HD). On January 16, 2024, the HD signal completely replaced the standard definition (SD) signal, broadcasting exclusively in HD.

=== 33 ===
TVC's second channel, El 33 is a cultural channel. Its programming consists of cultural programmes, documentaries and debates. Until 2011 and the creation of the sport channel Esport 3, it also broadcast sport events and programmes.

Originally called Canal 33, in 2003 it underwent a restructuring that split it into two channels that shared the same frequency: 33 and K3. While this is still true for analogical broadcasting, since December 2006, 33 has a channel of its own in digital terrestrial television.

=== SX3 ===
SX3 is a children's and teenagers' channel, that broadcasts from 6:00 to 21:30 on DTT (sharing its DTT channel with El 33) and 24 hours online on IPTV and HbbTV. It broadcasts both entertainment and educational programmes, for a wide range of ages. Early morning programmes are usually directed to younger children and use the brand S3, while the afternoon is directed more towards teenagers under the brand X3. It started on 10 October 2022, replacing Canal Super 3.

SX3 is the third incarnation of a children's and teenagers' channel from TVC, as Canal Super 3 replaced in 2009 in turn the previous children's channel, K3, which started in 2001.

=== Esport 3 ===
Esport3 is TVC's sports channel. It started its emission tests in October 2010 and started its regular emissions in early 2011. It broadcasts sports events and sports programmes (Temps d'aventura).

=== 3CatInfo ===
3CatInfo is TVC's 24-hour news channel, launched in 2003.

=== TV3CAT ===
TV3CAT (known as TVCi until June 2009) is TVC's international channel, launched in 1995. It broadcasts a selection of TV3 and 33 programmes, as well as fiction series and movies.
