= Sant Joan Despí =

- Municipality
- Location in Catalonia Sant Joan Despí (Spain)
- Coordinates: 41°22′05″N 2°03′29″E
- Country: Spain
- Community: Catalonia
- Province: Barcelona
- Comarca: Baix Llobregat

Government
  - Mayor: Antoni Poveda Zapata (2015) (PSC-PSOE)

Area
  - Total: 6.2 km^{2} (2.4 sq mi)
- Elevation: 10 m (33 ft)

Population (2025-01-01)
  - Total: 35,926
  - Density: 5,800/km^{2} (15,000/sq mi)
- Website: sjdespi.cat

Sant Joan Despí (Old Catalan for 'Saint John of the Pine'; Catalan pronunciation: [ˈsaɲ ʒuˈan dəsˈpi]) is a city and municipality located in the Baix Llobregat area (Barcelona province in Catalonia, Spain). It is situated on the left bank of the Llobregat river. Es is a dialectal form of the masculine article el, hence Despí would be rendered Del pi in standard Catalan.

Since 2006, the town has been the home of the FC Barcelona training ground and youth academy, the Ciutat Esportiva Joan Gamper; in 2019, the club's Johan Cruyff Stadium opened adjacent to the training facility, which is home to FC Barcelona Femení, FC Barcelona Atlètic, and Juvenil A (U19 A team).

== Districts ==
Currently, Sant Joan Despí has 31,438 inhabitants divided into 5 very disaggregated districts. It also has an industrial quarter.

=== Barri Centre ===
Barri Centre (Catalan for center quarter) is the original urban core of the town, formerly called Nucli antic (old town). The district is bounded by the railway, B-23 motorway, Cornellà de Llobregat and by the new Eixample district towards the Llobregat River. It is full of Art Deco buildings, many of them designed by Josep Maria Jujol who was the official town council architect from 1926. It also contains the oldest buildings of the town including Esglèsia de Sant Joan Batista (Saint John the Baptist Church) and a small medieval chapel. In the 1960s, this quarter was still a small set of cottages, where wealthy people from Barcelona spent their holidays, and small houses, but since then, urban spread has changed a lot substituting most of the houses with tall buildings and changing the green spaces into concrete parks. Nowadays you can still find some of the old small houses, and most of the singular ones but they are surrounded by modern buildings.

=== Les Planes ===
Les Planes (Catalan for 'the plains') is a district which appeared during the 1960s and the 1970s to house the incoming immigration from other Spanish regions especially Extremadura and Andalusia. Les Planes is separated from the center quarter by the Polígon Fontsanta industrial quarter and from the TV3 quarter by the Parc Fontsanta park and indeed, it is urbanistically continuous just towards the Padrò quarter of Cornellà de Llobregat.

This quarter is characterized by relatively tall buildings and narrow streets. Democratic councils have alleviated that by turning many of those streets into pedestrian streets.

=== Pla del Vent/Torreblanca ===
This district is placed at the other side of the B-23 motorway and to east of the railway. It is closer to Sant Feliu de Llobregat and Sant Just Desvern. This district has two names because is the union of two older quarters. Pla del Vent (Catalan for 'Wind Plane') was a set of small houses along a road communicating Sant Joan towards Sant Just Desvern. Torreblanca (Catalan for 'White Tower') was a new urbanization built during the last half of the 1980s besides the monumental Torreblanca Park which gave the name to the quarter. Later urbanizations joined both squares into a single district.

=== Residential Sant Joan (TV3) ===
This district was urbanized at the mid 1980s after the building of the main studios of the Catalan autonomic television, TV3, which is the reason why the quarter is popularly known as the 'TV3' quarter. It is a wealthy quarter surrounded by the large green zone called Fontsanta park which connects it with the Polígon Fontsanta and Les Planes.

=== Eixample ===
Eixample (Catalan for 'extension') is a new quarter, being built since 1998, during the real estate bubble in Spain, as an extension toward the Llobregat river of the Barri Centre.

=== Polígon Fontsanta ===
Polígon Fontsanta is an industrial district which is in the geographic center of Sant Joan Despí. For many years, the industrial estate attracted new residents to the town, which explains why new quarters were built around it instead of around the old town.

Important brands had their factories in the square including Gallina Blanca, San Miguel, and Trinaranjus.

== Transportation ==
A tram on Avinguda Barcelona in Sant Joan Despí

The town is linked to central Barcelona by several modes of public transport:

=== Bus ===
- TMB: 63, 157, 78
- EMT-AMB: L10, L46, L52
- Nitbus: N12, N15 (night service)

=== Train ===
- Renfe: R1, R4

=== Tram ===
- Trambaix: T1, T2, T3

== Demography ==
| 1900 | 1930 | 1950 | 1970 | 1986 | 2005 |
|---|---|---|---|---|---|
| 1171 | 2023 | 2274 | 16,055 | 23,867 | 31,438 |
