= Television in Catalonia =

Television in Catalonia, in reference to the autonomous community of Spain, is made up of television channels broadcast exclusively in Catalonia, whether for the whole of Catalonia or for certain regions and counties, as well as state-wide Spanish channels, which may or may not have disconnections from the general feed with exclusive programmes for Catalonia.

Programming on Catalan channels is mainly broadcast in one of the languages of Catalonia (Catalan and Aranese Occitan), although Castilian content is not subtitled or translated. Additionally, most Catalan channels and disconnected versions of Spain-wide channels are also watchable from Andorra and most of Northern Catalonia.

The first television broadcasts in Catalonia took place around the beginning of 1959, when the newly born Spanish television station Televisión Española (TVE) arrived in the capital city of Barcelona. Catalan public broadcaster Televisió de Catalunya (TVC) began broadcasting in 1983.

== History ==
=== During the dictatorship ===
Television broadcasts in Catalonia began in the late 1950s, under the dictatorship of Francisco Franco. Although Spanish broadcaster Televisión Española had officially started operating on 28 October 1956, broadcasts were only visible on a small number of television sets, all of which were located in Madrid. It was not until 15 February 1959 that it arrived in Catalonia, when the city of Barcelona began broadcasts with a football match between Real Madrid and FC Barcelona. Local headquarters, Miramar studios, were established in the city on 14 July of the same year.

Due to the strict repression and ban on Spanish languages other than Castilian under Franco's regime, no television programmes were initially broadcast in Catalan or Occitan. However, in 1964, the first ever official Catalan language broadcasts took place, when RTVE Catalunya began broadcasting some theatre programmes, such as Teatre Català. Most notably, the cultural programme Mare Nostrum was broadcast once a month from 1967 to 1973. 1975 saw the birth of Miramar, a territorial disconnection news programme for Catalonia, nowadays known as L'informatiu.

=== Transition ===
After the passing of Franco and the transition to democracy, Catalan language broadcasts began becoming more common and accepted. Catalan-language programmes began to be broadcast on TVE on a daily basis, with territorial broadcasts being mostly in Catalan from 1977 onwards.

On 7 June 1980, Televisió de Cardedeu, the first channel to broadcast entirely in Catalan, as well as the first local channel in Catalonia and in the whole of Spain, began broadcasting to the town of Cardedeu, in Vallès Oriental county. It is a community channel that continues operating today. In 1983, RTVE's Catalan studios were moved from Barcelona to Sant Cugat del Vallès (Vallès Occidental), where they remain today.

=== Birth of Televisió de Catalunya ===
Televisió de Catalunya's first logo, used from 1983 to 1993

On 29 September 1982, the Executive Council of Catalonia approved the draft law for the creation of a radio entity and television for Catalonia. On 23 April 1983, coinciding with St Jordi's Day, the Catalan government launched an experimental broadcast, which would become the first from Televisió de Catalunya (TVC), exclusively in the Eixample district of Barcelona.

Broadcasts from the nascent Catalan flagship channel TV3 began on a test basis on 10 September 1983, a day before the National Day of Catalonia, this time reaching 70% of Catalonia. Regular broadcasts started on 16 January 1984, point in which Catalan news programme Telenotícies was also first aired. By late 1984, TV3 reached all of Catalonia, including part of Northern Catalonia. In April 1986, Televisió de Catalunya opened its headquarters in Sant Joan Despí (Baix Llobregat).

On 10 September 1988, TVC started test broadcasts for its second channel, El 33, beginning regular broadcasts just a year later. That same year, TVE started its first broadcasts in Occitan, with programme Era Lucana.

On 24 April 1989, TV3 began broadcasting Telenotícies comarques, offering local news for each of the Catalan regions. Special broadcasts for the Aran Valley (in Occitan) began every Friday in 1990.

=== The 1990s ===
In 1991, TVE channel La 2 began broadcasting The Simpsons with a Catalan-dubbed audio option for Catalonia. That same year, commercial broadcaster Antena 3 launched regional broadcasts for Catalonia, the only ones not in Castilian in the whole of Spain.

On 24 July 1992, TVC and TVE signed an agreement to launch Canal Olímpic, a channel entirely dedicated to the 1992 Summer Olympics in Barcelona, replacing the frequency of El 33. It was restored to the original channel on 9 August.

On 3 November 1994, betevé, Barcelona's local television station, began broadcasting regular programmes, which can now be seen throughout the whole throughout Barcelonès county.

On 10 November 1994, TV3 began broadcasting Poble Nou, its first soap opera.

Commercial broadcaster Antena 3 obtained airing rights for The Simpsons in December 1994, exceptionally including the Catalan audio channel for Catalonia, but only up to the fourth season, the last that TVE had dubbed, being exclusively in Castilian from that point onwards.

On 27 July 1999, Barça TV began broadcasting. That same year, TVC began experimenting with broadcasting all its channels on digital terrestrial television.

=== The 2000s ===
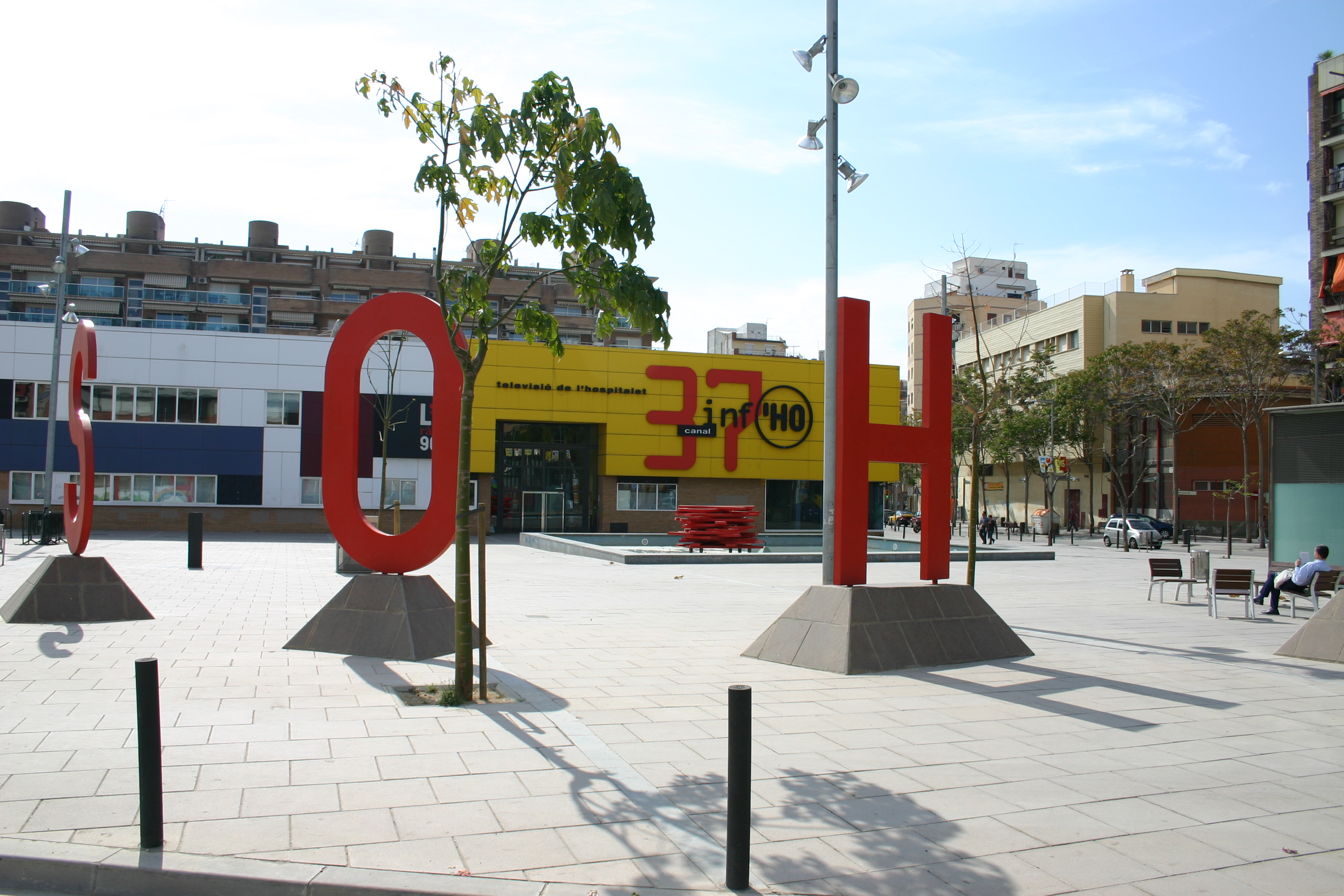
Headquarters of Televisió de l'Hospitalet in 2006

The city of L'Hospitalet de Llobregat (Barcelonès) began broadcasts of its own local television channel, Televisió de l'Hospitalet, on 22 December 2000.

On 23 April 2001, TVC began broadcasting channel K3, dedicated to children and young people, on the same frequency as El 33. On that same day, Citytv began broadcasting in Barcelona as the first fully commercial Catalan television station, later renaming to 8tv and broadcasting for all of Catalonia as well as Andorra.

The regional channel Lleida Televisió, which has coverage in Ponent, Alt Pirineu and Aran, began broadcasting on 10 May 2001.

On 11 September 2003, 3/24 was launched as TVC's all-news channel.

On 2 July 2004, Antena 3 discontinued its regional broadcasts in Catalonia. On 4 October of that same year, local broadcasting network Localia TV entered Catalonia with Catalan programming.

On 5 September 2005, the Balearic channel IB3 became visible in the south and east of Catalonia through analogue signals.

On 21 November 2005, TVC launched the Canal 300 series and films channel, available exclusively via digital terrestrial television.

TV3 began broadcasting an experimental HD channel on 23 April 2007.

In December 2007, IB3 discontinued its analogue broadcasts in Catalonia, replaced with IB Sat, a special version of the channel for Catalonia, which would take until 2009 to show up on digital terrestrial television.

On 9 February 2008, commercial musical channel RAC 105 TV began broadcasting.

In 2009, the Spanish all-news channel 24 Horas began broadcasting programmes exclusively for Catalonia. That same year, on 12 August, Valencian channel Nou began broadcasts in Catalonia, while TVC channels did the same in Valencia. In addition, on 18 October, K3 was replaced by Canal Super3, a new children's channel based on the Club Super3 programme.

=== The 2010s ===
The decade began with the analogue switch-off, which took place throughout the whole of Spain on 30 March 2010.

At the end of March 2010, Nou was replaced by Nou Internacional in Catalonia, as the Valencian government failed to consistently broadcast TVC channels. In July, Nou Internacional stopped broadcasting there entirely, going online-only due to financial problems.

On 19 September 2010, TVC launched Canal 3XL, replacing Canal 300, a youth programming channel with Catalan dubs of many series and anime shows.

On 5 November 2010, the first channel in Occitan, Aran TV, began broadcasting sporadically through the Lleida TV frequency, thanks to an agreement between the General Council of Aran and the Catalan government.

TVC began tests for a sports channel on 22 October 2010, called Esport3, fully rolling out on 5 February 2011.

On 30 September 2012, due to financial problems, 3XL ceased broadcasting, with El 33 broadcasting at night on the same frequency as Super3. On 1 November of that same year, IB3 stopped broadcasting in Catalonia.

On 30 April 2013, the Valencian and Catalan governments made an agreement to broadcast both TVV and TVC channels in both territories, although this was never realised due to the complete shutdown of Radiotelevisió Valenciana on 29 November 2013.

El Punt Avui TV, a channel from Girona-based newspaper El Punt Avui, began broadcasting on 23 April 2014.

On 15 April 2016, IB3 began broadcasting in Catalonia again, under a special IB3 Global channel.

The Corporació Catalana de Mitjans Audiovisuals and the Ens Públic de Radiotelevisió de les Illes Balears make an agreement to launch a pan-Catalan online channel, known as Bon Dia TV, on 27 November 2018. The Corporació Valenciana de Mitjans de Comunicació has also formed part of it since 19 November 2021.

El Punt Avui TV ceased broadcasting on 31 December 2019.

=== The 2020s ===
BOM Cine, a commercial films channel available in select Spanish communities, began broadcasting in Catalonia on 16 March 2020 through an agreement with 8tv owner Group Godó. Although only 3% of its airtime was broadcast in Catalan, in breach of Catalan broadcasting law, which requires a minimum of 50% in Catalan, no sanctions were taken against the broadcaster.

On 20 April 2020, commercial channel Teve.cat began broadcasting, watchable from the regions of Barcelona and Tarragona, as well as part of Girona and Central Catalonia.

RAC 105 TV closed on 1 June 2020, being replaced by Manresa-based commercial channel Fibracat TV, mainly targeting content relating to new technologies and feminism.

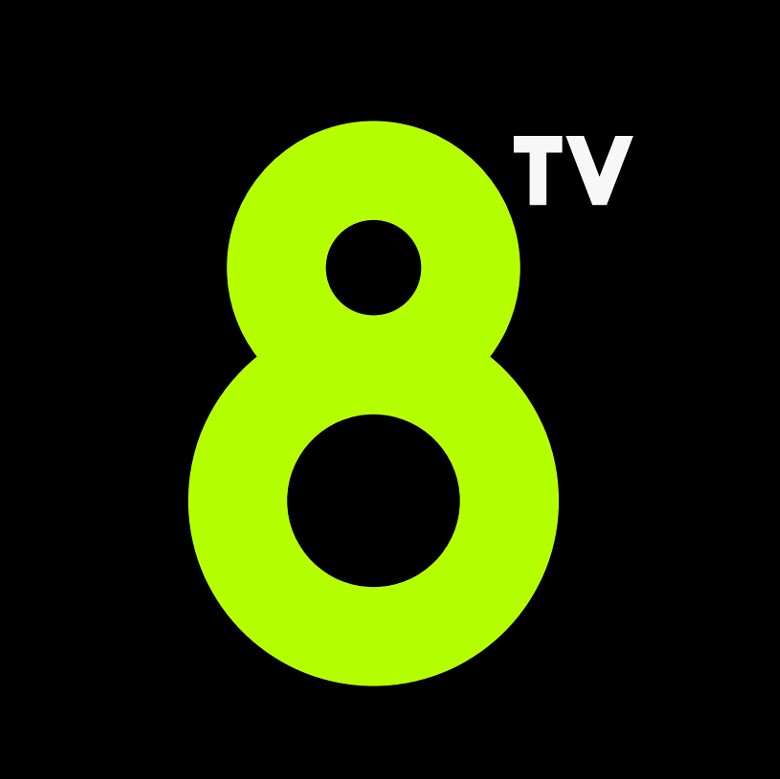
8tv's logo after the 2021 rebrand

Due to extremely low audience figures on commercial channel 8tv, broadcaster Group Godó announced the sale of Emissions Digitals de Catalunya on 5 March 2021, which, in addition to 8tv, included the frequencies of Barça TV, Fibracat TV and BOM Cine, to OC 2022, for ten million euros. It was authorised by the Catalan government in July 2021.

In March 2021, the sale of EDC was realised, forming part of OC 2022. The rebrand of 8tv was heralded as an attempt to compete with TVC, and one of the slogans used by 8tv when it was re-launched was "TV3, are you ready?". It was also announced that the broadcaster would begin to focus on full Catalan-language programming to achieve this competition, although on the very day of the rebrand the broadcaster continued to broadcast a large amount of content in Castilian.

On 23 November 2021, BOM Cine was replaced by Verdi Classics, a commercial channel broadcasting films, mainly in Catalan.

Teve.cat was shut down on 12 September 2022, date in which Canal 4 began broadcasting in the Barcelona region.

On 10 October 2022, Super3 was replaced by SX3, a rebrand of TVC's youth programming channel, displaying an S3 logo for children audiences and an X3 one for young viewers and more mature programmes. Although it still shared its frequency with El 33 on terrestrial television, it had now been made available online throughout the day. It was started in response to the very poor audiences of the former Super3.

Fibracat TV was closed on 31 December 2022, after the company stopped paying rent for the frequency in June 2021.

On 2 June 2023, the company managing 8tv, Emissions Digitals de Catalunya, declared a debt moratorium, and began a 3-month period to renegotiate the debt with its creditors. Due to financial issues, Barça TV was closed that month, on 30 June 2023.

Logo of the 3Cat brand

At a press conference in May 2023, the Corporació Catalana de Mitjans Audiovisuals announced the merger of Televisió de Catalunya and Catalunya Ràdio under a new brand, 3Cat, scheduled for 2028.

After having obtained several overtime concessions from the Catalan government, the company behind 8tv filed for bankruptcy and the channel was due to cease broadcasting at midnight on 15 October 2023. However, broadcasts continued both through terrestrial television and the internet until a few minutes after midnight on 17 October 2023, when both 8tv and Verdi Classics stopped broadcasting, marking the end of the whole of Catalan commercial television. As of May 2024, Catalonia's commercial multiplex (MAUT-CAT-2) continues to be empty.

On 30 October 2023, the CCMA launched the new 3Cat digital platform, replacing the old 3alacarta video-on-demand service and the TV3 mobile application. On the same day, channels 3/24, SX3, Esport3 and El 33 began broadcasting in HD, exclusively online, via the new platform, with terrestrial broadcasts continuing in SD quality.

On 8 January 2024, three months after the closure of 8tv, the station began operating again through the Internet, still self-proclaimed as "the commercial television of Catalonia", but now broadcasting entirely in Castilian. Some of its programmes are also broadcast through terrestrial television through Canal 4, which broadcasts in the Barcelona region, Mallorca and the community of Madrid.

Although the Spanish government had set the date to switch-off all SD television signals on 14 February 2024, Televisió de Catalunya announced on 12 January 2024 that they would carry out the switch-off a month earlier, on 16 January 2024. The SD version of TV3, the only TVC channel broadcasting through terrestrial in HD, was to be switched off, while all the other channels, which only aired in SD, would automatically switch to HD. Additionally, the Balearic channel IB3 Global, which was broadcast in Catalonia with a poor SD quality due to the limited space left in the multiplex, also switched to HD and a better-looking bitrate on that day. Following the switch-off of SD signals, the need for many viewers with older TV sets to buy an adapter or a newer TV caused queues and shortages throughout Catalonia.

On 31 March 2025, the administrative board of RTVE approved the creation of an entirely exclusive television channel for Catalonia, codenamed 2CAT, with the aim of starting test broadcasts by September 2025. They also announced that the children's channel Clan would offer a Catalan language audio track, which would become the default audio track in Catalonia but would only be accessible there.

== Regulations ==
Audiovisual content in Catalonia, which includes television broadcasts, is regulated by the Catalan Audiovisual Council, in accordance with article 82 of Catalonia's Statute of Autonomy and created in May 2000. The council conducts studies and monitors compliance with television and radio regulations (usage of Catalan, advertising, sexist content, impacts on children, violence/discrimination, etc.) and is, most significantly, the body responsible for approving and allocating frequencies to television channels.

The 1998 law of Catalan linguistic policy mandates that television channels with licences granted by the Catalan government must broadcast over 50% of their own programmes in Catalan.

== Local programming ==
=== Disconnected broadcasts ===
Since 24 April 1989, TV3's Telenotícies comarques programme offered a brief regional news segment via disconnections from the main feed for the four demarcations (Barcelona, Girona, Lleida and Tarragona) every working day, including a special Aranese-language broadcast for Aran on Fridays. In June 2017, these disconnected broadcasts were discontinued (with the exception of Aran).

=== County and regional broadcasters ===
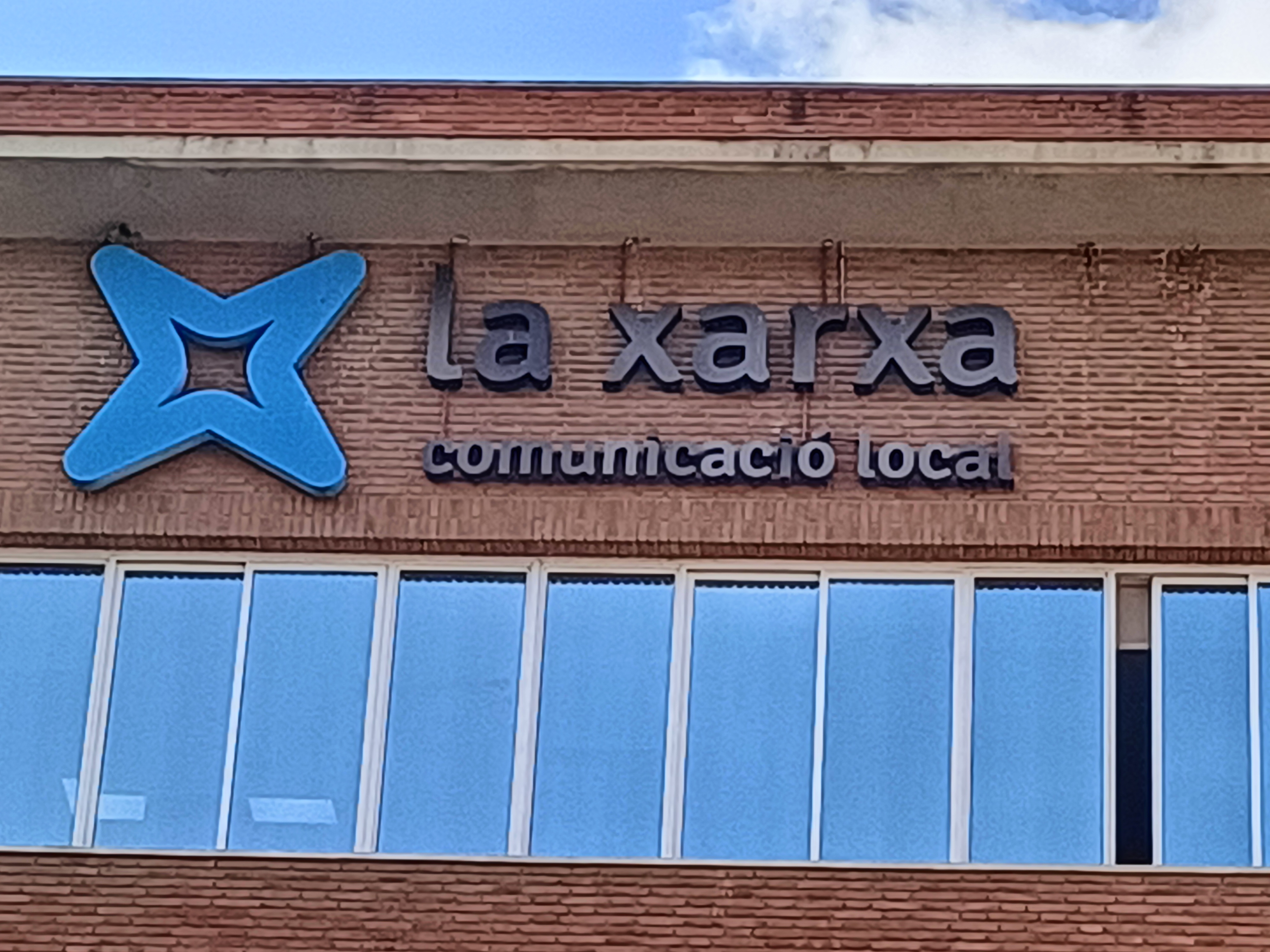
Headquarters of La Xarxa in the city of Barcelona

There are several local television channels in Catalonia, which can be watched exclusively in certain counties, regions or territories. Not all of these broadcasters are public, as some are commercial and some such as Ràdio Televisió Cardedeu are community-operated.

To provide much of the content to these broadcasters, the Xarxa de Comunicació Local (Local Communication Network) was set up in 2013 to share the content produced between member local broadcasters.

== List of terrestrial television stations ==
This is a list of the channels broadcasting through digital terrestrial television (DTT) in Catalonia, whether limited disconnections of unique content not available to the rest of Spain, or completely exclusive channels. For a list of state-wide channels that broadcast the same content in Catalonia as in the rest of Spain, see the List of television stations in Spain.

=== Active stations throughout all of Catalonia ===
==== Catalan channels ====
Channel	Broadcaster	Genre	Language(s)	Launch date	Type	Headquarters	Format	Multiplex
TV3	Televisió de Catalunya (TVC)	Generalist	Catalan (Note: During Catalan language broadcasts, content in Castilian is usually not translated.) Occitan (Aranese) (Note: During Occitan language broadcasts, content in Castilian or Catalan is usually not translated.)	1983-09-10	Public (Catalonia)	Sant Joan Despí (Baix Llobregat)	1080i HDTV	MAUT-CAT
El 33 (Note: El 33 and SX3 share the same frequency on terrestrial television, with SX3 broadcasting from 06:00 to 21:00 and El 33 from 21:00 to 06:00. The channel title reads "SX3/33". However, both channels are available full-time online through the 3Cat platform.)	Televisió de Catalunya (TVC)	Cultural	Catalan	1988-09-10	Public (Catalonia)	Sant Joan Despí (Baix Llobregat)	1080i HDTV	MAUT-CAT
SX3	Televisió de Catalunya (TVC)	Educational, entertainment	Catalan	2022-10-10	Public (Catalonia)	Sant Joan Despí (Baix Llobregat)	1080i HDTV	MAUT-CAT
Esport3	Televisió de Catalunya (TVC)	Sports	Catalan	2011-02-05	Public (Catalonia)	Sant Joan Despí (Baix Llobregat)	1080i HDTV	MAUT-CAT
3CatInfo	Televisió de Catalunya (TVC)	News	Catalan Occitan (Aranese)	2003-09-11	Public (Catalonia)	Sant Joan Despí (Baix Llobregat)	1080i HDTV	MAUT-CAT
IB3 Global	Televisió de les Illes Balears	Generalist	Catalan	2016-04-15	Public (Balearic Islands)	Calvià (Mallorca)	1080i HDTV	MAUT-CAT

==== Spanish channels with local opt-outs ====
Channel	Broadcaster	Genre	Language(s)	Launch date	Type	Headquarters	Format	Multiplex
La 1 (Catalan feed)	Televisión Española (TVE)	Generalist	Castilian (state-wide content) Catalan (local opt-out programmes)	1975-06-15	Public (Spain)	Sant Cugat del Vallès (Vallès Occidental)	1080i HDTV (Note: The UHD feed does not include disconnected programmes. Disconnections for all territories show 24 Horas instead, while Catalan-exclusive disconnections continue to show the state-wide feed.)	RGE1-CAT
La 2 Cat	Televisión Española (TVE)	Generalist, cultural	Catalan	2025-10-13	Public (Spain)	Sant Cugat del Vallès (Vallès Occidental)	1080i HDTV	RGE1-CAT
24h (Catalan feed)	Televisión Española (TVE)	News	Castilian (state-wide content) Catalan (local opt-out programmes)	2009	Public (Spain)	Sant Cugat del Vallès (Vallès Occidental)	1080i HDTV	RGE1-CAT

=== Active regional/local stations ===
==== Barcelona region ====
Broadcast area	Channel	Broadcaster	Genre	Language(s)	Launch date	Type	Headquarters	Format	Multiplex
Barcelonès	betevé	Informació i Comunicació de Barcelona (City Council of Barcelona)	Generalist, local	Catalan	1994-11-03	Public (city of Barcelona)	Sant Martí, Barcelona (Barcelonès)	1080i HDTV	TL01B
Barcelonès	Televisió de Badalona	Badalona Comunicació	Generalist, local	Catalan	2000-02-14	Public (Badalona)	Badalona (Barcelonès)	1080i HDTV	TL01B
Barcelonès	Televisió de l'Hospitalet	L'Hdigital	Generalist, local	Catalan	2000-12-22	Public (L'Hospitalet de Llobregat)	L'Hospitalet de Llobregat (Barcelonès)	1080i HDTV	TL01B
Barcelonès	Fibwi4	Fibwi	Generalist, local	Catalan, Castilian	1986	Commercial	Palma (Mallorca)	1080i HDTV	TL10B
Vallès Oriental	Vallès Oriental Televisió	Vallès Oriental Televisió	Generalist, local	Catalan	2009-09	Public (Vallès Oriental)	Granollers (Vallès Oriental)	1080i HDTV	TL02B
Vallès Oriental	Vallès Visió	Consorci Teledigital Mollet	Generalist, local	Catalan	2010-03-25	Public (Vallès Oriental)	Mollet del Vallès (Vallès Oriental)	1080i HDTV	TL02B
Vallès Oriental	Ràdio Televisió Cardedeu	Ajuntament de Cardedeu	Generalist, local	Catalan	1981-06-23	Non-profit community	Cardedeu (Vallès Oriental)	1080i HDTV	TL02B
Baix Llobregat	ETV Llobregat	Esplugues Televisió (ETV)-Terramar	Generalist, local	Catalan	1986-09-21	Commercial	Esplugues de Llobregat (Baix Llobregat)	1080i HDTV	TL03B
Maresme	tvmataró	Mataró Audiovisual	Generalist, local	Catalan	1984	Public (Maresme)	Mataró (Maresme)	1080i HDTV	TL06B
Maresme	MarTV	Canal Català Maresme	Generalist, local	Catalan, Castilian	?	Commercial	Premià de Mar (Maresme)	1080i HDTV	TL06B
Vallès Occidental	Mola TV	MolaHits TV	Generalist, local	Catalan	2004-04-23	Commercial	Sabadell (Vallès Occidental)	1080i HDTV	TL07B
Vallès Occidental	Televisió Sant Cugat	Televisió Sant Cugat	Generalist, local	Catalan	1986	Commercial	Sant Cugat del Vallès (Vallès Occidental)	1080i HDTV	TL07B
Vallès Occidental	Canal Terrassa Vallès	Consorci per a la Gestió de la Televisió Digital Pública Terrassa-Vallès Oest	Generalist, local	Catalan	1986-01-17	Public (Vallès Occidental)	Terrassa (Vallès Occidental)	1080i HDTV	TL07B
Vallès Occidental	Canal Terrassa Vallès	Consorci per a la Gestió de la Televisió Digital Pública Terrassa-Vallès Oest	Generalist, local	Catalan	1986-01-17	Public (Vallès Occidental)	Terrassa (Vallès Occidental)	1080i HDTV	TL12B

==== Alt Pirineu region ====
Broadcast area	Channel	Broadcaster	Genre	Language(s)	Launch date	Type	Headquarters	Format	Multiplex
Alta Ribagorça Alt Urgell Baixa Cerdanya Pallars Jussà Pallars Sobirà	Lleida Televisió	Productora Lleidatana de Televisió (Grup Segre)	Generalist, local	Catalan	2001-05-10	Commercial	Lleida (Segrià)	1080i HDTV	TL03L
Alta Ribagorça Alt Urgell Baixa Cerdanya Pallars Jussà Pallars Sobirà	Pirineus TV	Cadena Pirenaica de Ràdio i Televisió	Generalist, local	Catalan	2003-09-11	Commercial	La Seu d'Urgell (Alt Urgell)	1080i HDTV	TL03L

==== Central Catalonia region ====
Broadcast area	Channel	Broadcaster	Genre	Language(s)	Launch date	Type	Headquarters	Format	Multiplex
Anoia (north)	Canal Taronja Anoia	Grup Taelus de Comunicació	Generalist, local	Catalan	2007-02-05	Commercial	Manresa (Bages)	1080i HDTV	TL04B
Bages Berguedà Solsonès	Canal Taronja Catalunya Central	Grup Taelus de Comunicació	Generalist, local	Catalan	2007-02-05	Commercial	Manresa (Bages)	1080i HDTV	TL05B
Bages Berguedà Solsonès	Televisió del Berguedà	Televisió del Berguedà	Generalist, local	Catalan	1991	Commercial	Berga (Berguedà)	1080i HDTV	TL05B
Lluçanès Moianès Osona	Canal Taronja Osona, Moianès i Lluçanès	Grup Taelus de Comunicació	Generalist, local	Catalan	2007-02-05	Commercial	Manresa (Bages)	1080i HDTV	TL08B
Lluçanès Moianès Osona	El 9 TV	Premsa d'Osona	Generalist, local	Catalan	2004-09-20	Commercial	Vic (Osona)	1080i HDTV	TL08B

==== Girona region ====
Broadcast area	Channel	Broadcaster	Genre	Language(s)	Launch date	Type	Headquarters	Format	Multiplex
Alt Empordà	Canal 10 Empordà	Consorci de la TDT de l'Alt Empordà	Generalist, local	Catalan	2009-07	Public (Alt Empordà)	L'Escala (Alt Empordà)	1080i HDTV	TL02GI
Alt Empordà	Empordà TV	Empordà Digital	Generalist, local	Catalan	2009	Public (Alt Empordà)	Alt Empordà	1080i HDTV	TL02GI
Gironès Pla de l'Estany	Televisió de Girona	Televisió de Girona	Generalist, local	Catalan	1985	Commercial	Girona (Gironès)	1080i HDTV	TL03GI
Gironès Pla de l'Estany	Banyoles Televisió	Dracvisió - plaestanydigital.cat	Generalist, local	Catalan	2012-09	Public (Pla de l'Estany)	Banyoles (Pla de l'Estany)	1080i HDTV	TL03GI
Garrotxa Ripollès	Olot Televisió	Corisa Media Grup	Generalist, local	Catalan	1998-01-31	Commercial	Olot (Garrotxa)	1080i HDTV	TL04GI
Garrotxa Ripollès	Televisió del Ripollès	Corisa Media Grup	Generalist, local	Catalan	1993	Commercial	Ripoll (Ripollès)	1080i HDTV	TL04GI
Baix Empordà	Televisió Costa Brava	Costa Brava Digital	Generalist, local	Catalan	?	Commercial	Castell d'Aro, Platja d'Aro i S'Agaró (Baix Empordà)	1080i HDTV	TL05GI

==== Ponent region ====
Broadcast area	Channel	Broadcaster	Genre	Language(s)	Launch date	Type	Headquarters	Format	Multiplex
Garrigues Noguera Pla d'Urgell Segarra Segrià	Lleida Televisió	Productora Lleidatana de Televisió (Grup Segre)	Generalist, local	Catalan	2001-05-10	Commercial	Lleida (Segrià)	1080i HDTV	TL01L TL02L

==== Penedès region ====
Broadcast area	Channel	Broadcaster	Genre	Language(s)	Launch date	Type	Headquarters	Format	Multiplex
Anoia (south)	Canal Taronja Anoia	Grup Taelus de Comunicació	Generalist, local	Catalan	2007-02-05	Commercial	Manresa (Bages)	1080i HDTV	TL04B
Alt Penedès Anoia (south) Baix Penedès Garraf	Penedès Televisió	Consorci Penedès Televisió	Generalist, local	Catalan	2009-09-11	Public (Alt Penedès)	Vilafranca del Penedès (Alt Penedès)	1080i HDTV	TL09B
Alt Penedès Anoia (south) Baix Penedès Garraf	Canal Blau	Informació i Comunicació de Vilanova i la Geltrú	Generalist, local	Catalan	1989-07	Public (Garraf)	Vilanova i la Geltrú (Garraf)	1080i HDTV	TL09B
Alt Penedès Anoia (south) Baix Penedès Garraf	TV El Vendrell (Note: Broadcasting through the Penedès Televisió frequency since 21 March 2016.)	El Vendrell Comunicació (Ràdio i Televisió El Vendrell)	Generalist, local	Catalan	1996-10-13	Public (Baix Penedès)	El Vendrell (Baix Penedès)	1080i HDTV	TL09B
Alt Penedès Anoia (south) Baix Penedès Garraf	Terramar Penedès (Canal Costa Catalana)	Esplugues Televisió (ETV)-Terramar	Generalist, local	Catalan	2018	Commercial	Esplugues de Llobregat (Baix Llobregat)	1080i HDTV	TL09B

==== Tarragona region ====
Broadcast area	Channel	Broadcaster	Genre	Language(s)	Launch date	Type	Headquarters	Format	Multiplex
Baix Camp Priorat	Canal Reus TV	Iniciatives de Televisió	Generalist, local	Catalan	1998-06	Commercial	Reus (Baix Camp)	1080i HDTV	TL01T
Baix Camp Priorat	Televisió de Vandellòs	Ajuntament de Vandellòs i l'Hospitalet de l'Infant	Generalist, local	Catalan	1993-11-11	Public (Vandellòs i l'Hospitalet de l'Infant)	Vandellòs i l'Hospitalet de l'Infant (Baix Camp)	1080i HDTV	TL01T
Alt Camp Conca de Barberà Tarragonès	TAC 12	Tacoalt	Generalist, local	Catalan	2009-09-14	Public (city of Tarragona)	Tarragona (Tarragonès)	1080i HDTV	TL02T
Alt Camp Conca de Barberà Tarragonès	Terramar Tarragona (Canal Costa Catalana)	Esplugues Televisió (ETV)-Terramar	Generalist, local	Catalan	2018	Commercial	Esplugues de Llobregat (Baix Llobregat)	1080i HDTV	TL02T

==== Terres de l'Ebre region ====
Broadcast area	Channel	Broadcaster	Genre	Language(s)	Launch date	Type	Headquarters	Format	Multiplex
Baix Ebre Montsià Terra Alta Ribera d'Ebre	Canal Terres de l'Ebre	Ebre Digital	Generalist, local	Catalan	2013-09-30	Commercial	Tortosa (Baix Ebre)	1080i HDTV	TL03T
Baix Ebre Montsià Terra Alta Ribera d'Ebre	TE24	Ebre Digital	News, local	Catalan	2022-10	Commercial	Tortosa (Baix Ebre)	1080i HDTV	TL03T
Baix Ebre Montsià Terra Alta Ribera d'Ebre	Canal 21 Ebre	Doble Columna	Generalist, local	Catalan	2010-03-19	Commercial	Tortosa (Baix Ebre)	1080i HDTV	TL03T

==== Aran Valley ====
Broadcast area	Channel	Broadcaster	Genre	Language(s)	Launch date	Type	Headquarters	Format	Multiplex
Aran	Lleida Televisió	Productora Lleidatana de Televisió (Grup Segre)	Generalist, local	Catalan	2001-05-10	Commercial	Lleida (Segrià)	1080i HDTV	TL04L
Aran	Aran TV (Note: Aran TV is not a channel in itself, but broadcasts as a temporary channel over Lleida TV's frequency.)	Conselh Generau d'Aran	Generalist, local	Occitan (Aranese)	2010-11-05	Public (Aran)	Vielha e Mijaran (Aran)	1080i HDTV	TL04L

=== Defunct stations that broadcast throughout Catalonia ===
Channel	Broadcaster	Genre	Language(s)	Launch date	Switch-off date	Type	Headquarters
Super3	Televisió de Catalunya (TVC)	Educational, entertainment	Catalan	2009-10-18	2022-10-10	Public (Catalonia)	Sant Joan Despí (Baix Llobregat)
Canal 300	Televisió de Catalunya (TVC)	Entertainment	Catalan	2005-11-28	2010-09-19	Public (Catalonia)	Sant Joan Despí (Baix Llobregat)
3XL	Televisió de Catalunya (TVC)	Entertainment	Catalan	2010-09-19	2012-09-19	Public (Catalonia)	Sant Joan Despí (Baix Llobregat)
K3	Televisió de Catalunya (TVC)	Educational, entertainment	Catalan	2001-04-23	2009-10-18	Public (Catalonia)	Sant Joan Despí (Baix Llobregat)
Nou	Televisió Valenciana	Generalist	Catalan, Castilian	2009-08-12	2010-03-31	Public (Valencian Country)	Burjassot (Horta Nord)
Nou Internacional	Televisió Valenciana	Generalist	Catalan, Castilian	2010-03-31	2010-07-16	Public (Valencian Country)	Burjassot (Horta Nord)
8tv	Emissions Digitals de Catalunya (EDC)	Generalist, local	Catalan, Castilian	2001-04-23	2023-10-17	Commercial	Sant Just Desvern (Baix Llobregat)
Verdi Classics	Emissions Digitals de Catalunya (EDC)	Films	Catalan, Castilian	2021-11-23	2023-10-16	Commercial	Barcelona (Barcelonès)
Barça TV	FC Barcelona	Sports	Catalan, Castilian, English	1996-09-16	2023-06-30	Commercial	Sant Joan Despí (Baix Llobregat)
