= Eloi Martín Casanovas =

Spanish monologist (born 1995)

- Born: 1995 (age 30–31); Sabadell, Spain
- Education: Autonomous University of Barcelona
- Occupations: Actor and LGBT activist

Eloi Martín Casanovas (Sabadell, b. 1995) is a Spanish monologist and actor, and an activist for LGBTQ rights.

== Biography ==
Casanovas graduated from Autonomous University of Barcelona with a degree in Humanities and a minor in general studies.

In his creations, he mixes different artistic languages like dance, poetry or music. He is a member of the transsexual youths of Barcelona and of Llamada por Sabadell, from the LGBTQ association Ca l'Enredus de Sabadell, and he as worked as an usher in the Teatre Lliure. In 2019 he was a candidate for the Popular Unity Candidacy for Barcelona in the 2019 Spanish local elections.

He became known on television for playing the character of Andrea in the series Oh My Goig, on betevé (2017 - 2021). In the TV3 series Com si fos ahir he has played the character of Jair since 2022, the first trans character on the show.

In February 2023 he presented Middleground Cómo se construye el deseo (Middleground How desire is built) in the Sarria Civic Center, which is part of the network of civic centers in Barcelona, within the programming Bohemian Lights 2023. In the work Middleground Casanovas questions the norms, ideals, and etiquettes, while asking about the price we pay for pursuing success.

== Filmography ==
=== Television ===
- Oh My Goig
- Com si fos ahir
