= La 2 Cat =

- Country: Spain
- Broadcast area: Catalonia and Andorra, reaching bordering regions via overspill of the Catalan terrestrial network
- Network: Televisión Española (TVE)
- Headquarters: RTVE Catalunya; Sant Cugat del Vallès (Barcelona), Catalonia

Programming
- Language: Catalan
- Picture format: 1080i HDTV

Ownership
- Owner: Radiotelevisión Española (RTVE)
- Sister channels: La 1 La 2 Clan; 24h Teledeporte

History
- Launched: 13 October 2025; 13 months ago

Availability

Terrestrial
- Digital terrestrial television: Catalonia: Depends on each province

La 2 Cat is the current Catalan-language regional variation of Spanish free-to-air television channel La 2 in Catalonia. It started broadcasting on 13 October 2025, and became fully operational by late October of the same year. It is owned by Radiotelevisión Española (RTVE) and is produced in its production center in Sant Cugat del Vallès. It currently occupies most of the broadcast of La 2 in Catalonia, replacing most, but not all, the national programming in Spanish, but the intention is that it will soon have its own frequency and that both channels will be independent.

La 2 Cat's first director is Oriol Nolis, who was director of RTVE Catalunya between 2021 and 2023, and the director of content is Laura Folguera, who was the director of La 2.

== History ==
=== El canalet ===
In May 1988, Lluís Prenafeta, Secretary-General of the Presidency of the Generalitat de Catalunya, announced with the electoral promise of CiU the creation of the second channel of Televisió de Catalunya, Canal 33 (initially named TV4). On the other hand, in June that same year, Jaume Sobrequés, in charge of the media relations of PSC, demanded Televisión Española (TVE) the creation of a channel entirely in Catalan, since the sports broadcasts on TVE2 made most of its Catalan-language regional variation programming (including L'informatiu) off the air or simply changed their timeslot, which would lead to the firing of Rafael Jorba, TVE news director at RTVE Catalunya, who was replaced by Enric Lloveras.

In mid-August 1988, Pilar Miró, Director-General of RTVE, approved the project and fixed the launch date as between that year's National Day of Catalonia in September and October, with initial coverage of 60% of the territory and a budget of over 2 billion pesetas. Its airtime was projected to be between 19:00 and midnight and would air programs that were already on air on the Catalan opt-outs, with L'informatiu (with a fixed slot at 21:00), 135 escons, Debat 2, and Teledues (simulcast with TVE2's opt-out), as well as the premieres of Falcon Crest and Som una maravella by Els Joglars.

The project was expected to start on 17 October, with the name of TVE2-Catalunya, which was usually nicknamed by locals as El canalet ("The Little Channel"), but the arrival of Agustí Farré, director of TVE Catalunya, to Radio Nacional de España (RNE), caused the nomination of a successor and the start of Canal 33's test broadcasts on 10 September (which was interfered by TVE) causing its postponement to 9 January 1989, and later to April, given that it was necessary to distribute the frequencies between Canal 33 (already authorized), el canalet and the new private networks. With the firing of Miró in 1989, the project ended up in nothing and subsequently it was never launched.

=== Recovery of the project ===
Radiotelevisión Española (RTVE)'s administrative council unanimously approved the creation of La 2 Cat on 28 March 2025. Production is made at the RTVE production center in Sant Cugat del Vallès. In the days following the announcement of the channel's name, tensions arose between Corporació Catalana de Mitjans Audiovisuals (CCMA) and RTVE for the name, with a race to register names. For this reason, days after the presentation of the project to the public, the doors were open to find another name for the channel.

La 2 Cat started broadcasting on 13 October 2025, and became fully operational by late October of the same year. It began as a regional variation of La 2, occupying most of the broadcast of the channel in Catalonia, replacing most, but not all, the national programming in Spanish, but with the intention that it will soon have its own frequency and that both channels will be independent.

== Usage of Catalan ==
RTVE announced that La 2 Cat has as its priority goal the promotion of the Catalan language inside the Spanish public media system. However, initially La 2 Cat will not replace all of La 2's broadcast with Catalan-language programming, and at the time of its creation, no specific date has been set for it to become independent and achieve a 100% goal.

RTVE's administrative complex established a progressive implementation:

- Before the end of 2025, at least 50% of the contents seen in La 2 would be by La 2 Cat in Catalan.
- Before June 2026, this percentage will increase to a minimum of 60%.

The remaining 40–50% of La 2 Spanish-language programming, including documentaries, cultural, and divulgative programming, could be offered with Catalan subtitles, but it was not predicted that all of them will be dubbed.

Although RTVE sources have expressed the will that the channel will become independent at a mid-term, there is no formal compromise or calendar to achieve the 100% goal. Such question is evaluated by the Catalan Audiovisual Council (CAC), who also assured continuity, budget and the exclusive use of Catalan in the channel.

== Programming ==
La 2 Cat revealed its initial weekday programming in July 2025:

- 8:00: Cafè d'idees, with Gemma Nierga. News and entertainment magazine.
- 11:00: El segon cafè, with Cristina Villanueva. Current affairs and entertainment magazine.
- 13:00: De cara a barraca, with Marc Martín. Magazine and sports discussion.
- 14:00: L'informatiu 1. Newscast with Aina Galduf.
- 15:05: Sports news.
- 16:15: Grans documentals. Documentary slot
- 17:00: L'altaveu with Danae Boronat. News and entertainment magazine.
- 19:45: El vespre, with Quim Barnola. News bulletin from TVE's 24 Horas channel.
- 20:00: L'informatiu 2. Newscast with Quim Barnola.
- 20:35: Sports news.
- 22:00: Prime time programming

== See also ==
- Television in Catalonia
