= L'informatiu =

- Genre: News
- Country of origin: Spain
- Original language: Catalan

Production
- Producer: RTVE Catalunya (RTVE)
- Running time: 20 minutes (La 1); 35 minutes (La 2 Cat)

Original release
- Network: La 1 La 2 Cat
- Release: 15 June 1975 – present

L'informatiu is a Catalan-speaking television newscast produced by RTVE Catalunya. It began on 15 June 1975 in Spanish as Miramar (named after the former RTVE Barcelona studios), but on 3 October 1977, it started broadcasting entirely in Catalan, for which it became the first televised newscast in the language.

On 2 October 1978, with a change to the schedule of TVE's Catalan circuit, it was renamed Crònica and, quickly after, a second edition was added to the second channel, named Crònica 2. The evening edition disappeared in summer 1981 and changed its name to Migdia, though in October of that year it reverted to Miramar. Finally, on 21 January 1986, Miramar and Comarques (news and reports from the comarques) merged under the name L'informatiu, which is still in use today. The name also coincided with the move to the Sant Cugat del Vallès complex.

L'informatiu used to have four editions (L'informatiu matí, L'informatiu migdia, L'informatiu vespre and L'informatiu cap de setmana), but the evening edition disappeared on 23 September 2013, when it was included in Vespre a La 2. Since 24 September 2012, a bulletin at 3:55pm is aired on La 1, after the first edition of Telediario.

Since late September 2020, the weekday edition at 1:55pm-2:10pm moved to La 1, and was repeated at 2:15pm on La 2. With the launch of La 2 Cat in October 2025, it became a charter programme.
