= RTVE Catalunya =

RTVE production centre in Catalonia

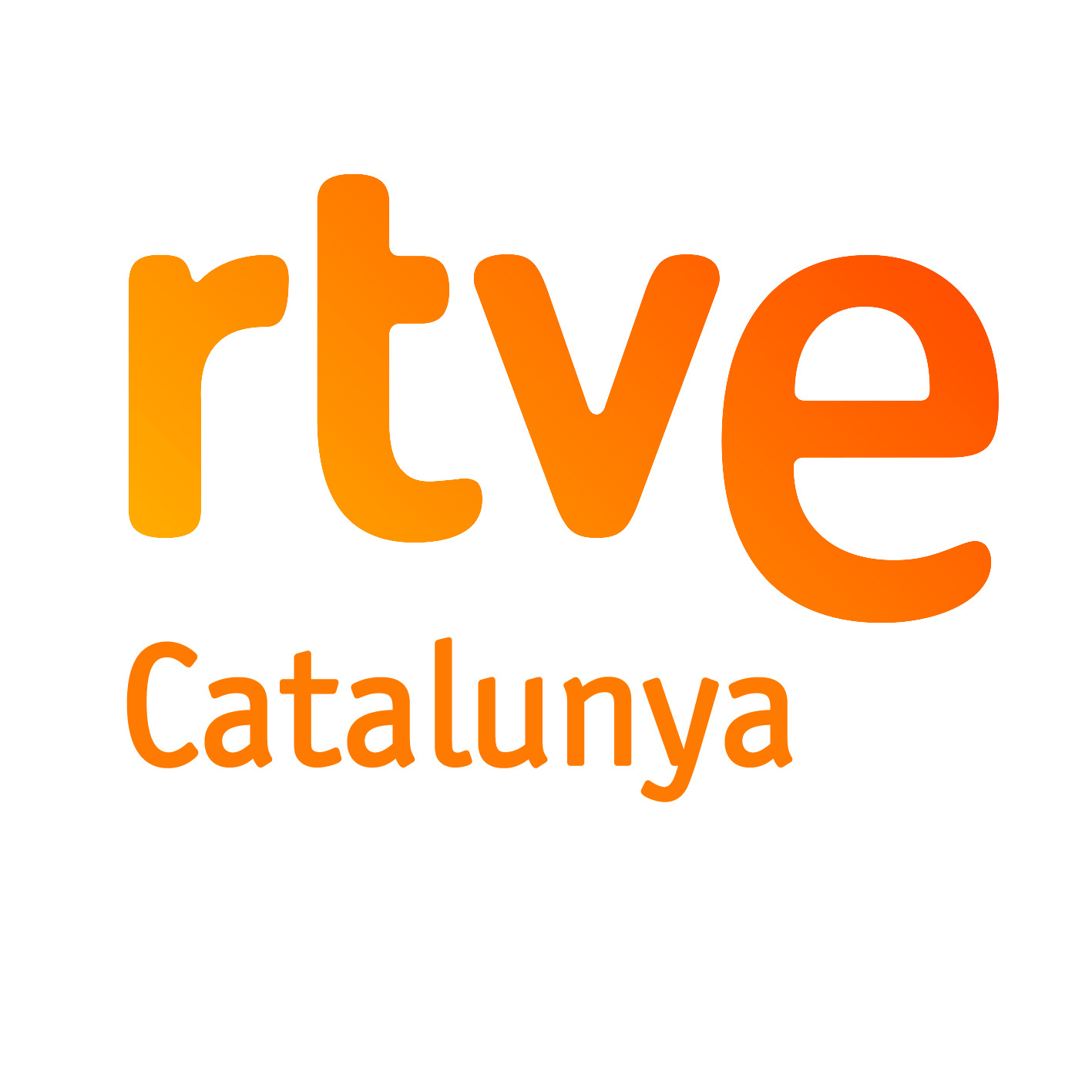

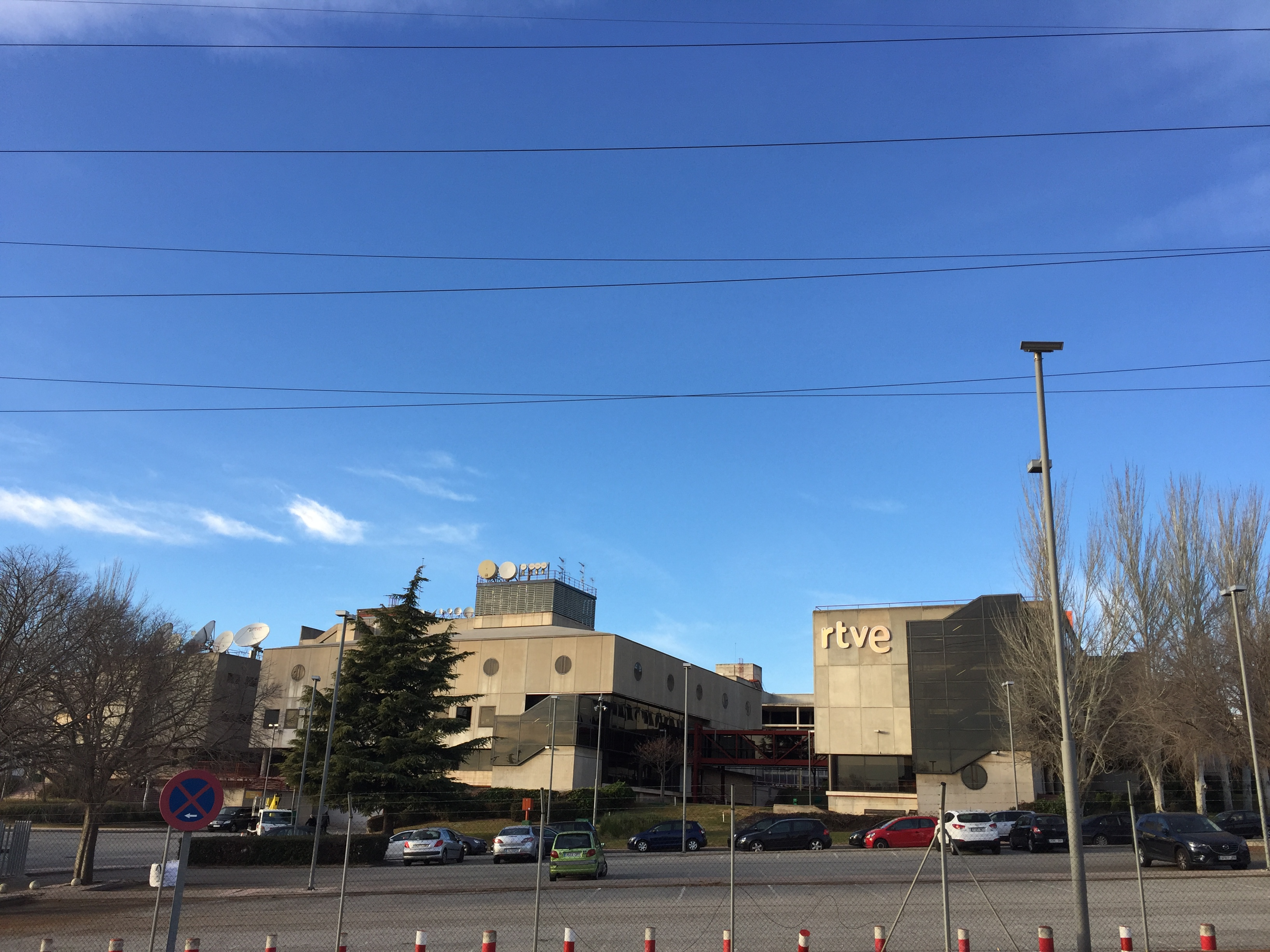
- RTVE studios in Sant Cugat del Vallès

General information
- Location: Sant Cugat del Vallès (Barcelona), Spain
- Inaugurated: 14 July 1959; 67 years ago
- Owner: Radiotelevisión Española

RTVE Catalunya is the production center of Radiotelevisión Española (RTVE) located in Catalonia. The center is in charge of the local programming of Televisión Española (TVE) and Radio Nacional de España (RNE), broadcast to the region through their television channels and radio stations in regional variation, and of the regional station Ràdio 4. It is also in charge of the sports channel Teledeporte, of the news coverage of the region for the central news services, and of producing some programs that are broadcast nationally.

TVE's production center in Catalonia was founded on 14 July 1959 at the Miramar studios in Barcelona, and on 27 June 1983, it moved to its current location at Sant Cugat del Vallès.

It is RTVE's most important production center outside of Madrid. Some of the best-known programs produced at the center for national television have been Saber y ganar, the three last seasons of Barrio Sésamo, and Redes. Since 13 October 2025, the regional variation of La 2 in Catalan has considerably increased its programming creating its own entity and identity: La 2 Cat.

== History ==
=== Miramar ===
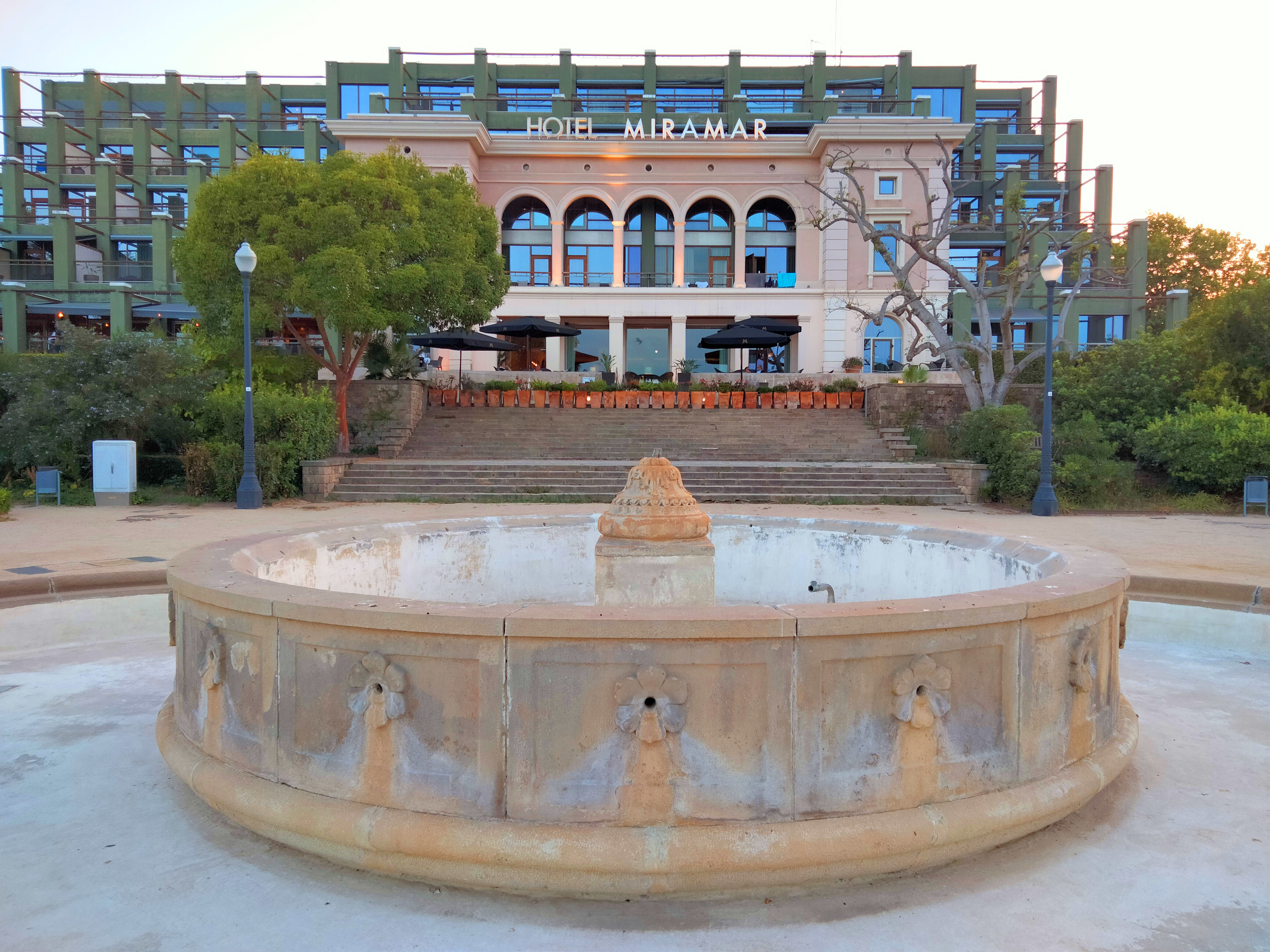
The Miramar studios were converted back into a hotel, keeping only the façade (pictured in 2023).

When the first channel of Televisión Española (TVE) started its regular broadcasts on 28 October 1956, it only reached Madrid and its environs. The next step was to bring the television signal to Barcelona; for this the broadcasting centre in Zaragoza was inaugurated on 12 October 1958, and on the first week of February 1959, the broadcasting center in Barcelona began to operate. On 15 February 1959, it began its regular television broadcasts in the city with the 1958–59 La Liga season football match between Real Madrid CF and CF Barcelona from the Santiago Bernabéu Stadium.

On 14 July 1959, the TVE studios in Barcelona were opened. They were located at the former Hotel Miramar, atop Montjuïc, which had housed a restaurant in the 1929 Barcelona International Exposition, thus becoming the Miramar studios. The first local broadcast produced in the studios was a variety show named Balcón del Mediterráneo, which later inspired Club Miramar, the first show produced there for national television. The first director of the production center was Enrique de las Casas.

Since the beginning, Miramar studios became the second most important production center for TVE. Due to its geographical location, for many years it was the connection point between the TVE broadcasting network and the Eurovision network, thus becoming the only link with the other broadcasters of the European Broadcasting Union (EBU). All the international news and programs that came through Eurovision passed through Miramar, such as the Wedding of Baudouin of Belgium and Fabiola de Mora y Aragón, the Tour de France, or the Eurovision Song Contest. Initially, all programming produced for regional broadcast was in Spanish; until 27 October 1964, when the first program in Catalan was produced: Teatro catalán. From there, programs in Catalan were residual, limited to thirteen hours a month until 1974, when continuous Catalan-language production began.

TVE's Circuit Català logo during the 1980s.

With the launch of TVE's second channel, the production center had more time for opt-outs to deliver its own programming, therefore some secondary studios were used in Esplugues de Llobregat and l'Hospitalet de Llobregat. The re-establishment of democracy in Spain led to a significant increase of Catalan-language programming, with programs such as the first newscast in that language, Miramar (later L'informatiu), first aired on 3 October 1977, or Terra d'escudella, the first children's program in Catalan. TVE's regional variation was consolidated under the name Circuit Català (Catalan Circuit), already aiming for linguistic normalization, and, from a total of 54 hours of programming per month in 1977, it raised to 60 in 1978.

=== Sant Cugat del Vallès ===
On 27 June 1983, the production center moved to new facilities in Sant Cugat del Vallès. With the relocation, it gradually increased its production, which was centralized in a single location.

For years, TVE Catalunya aspired to have a greater autonomy. In 1980, its professionals presented to the central direction a plan known as Informe Miramar to create a third channel for Catalonia, a goal that was stagnated with the launch in 1984 of TV3 by the regional government. The document also qualified the situation of Catalan at TVE as marginal and without global voaction, and defined the news service as being regionalist and partial. In 1987, the second channel gained more time for opt-outs and, under the directorate of Pilar Miró, a plan for a third TVE channel only for Catalonia was being studied, but this did not bring in benefits for TV3, which already received a second frequency to launch Canal 33. The programming of Circuit Català became public service programming, complementary to TV3 and only in Catalan.

At the national level, the production center in Catalonia consolidated its position, producing all kinds of programs for national television such as Si lo sé no vengo, El tiempo es oro, Saber y ganar, 3×4, the last three seasons of Barrio Sésamo, Ni en vivo ni en directo, Ahí te quiero ver, Tariro, Tariro, Planeta imaginario, Pinnic, and Redes. Some of the presenters working in the center were Julia Otero, Eduard Punset, Alfonso Arús, Olga Viza, Lorenzo Milá, Mercedes Milá, Rosa María Sardá, Javier Sardà, Jordi Hurtado, Jordi González, and La Trinca. One of its biggest artifices was director Sergi Schaaff, who devised and directed many of these programs himself. The center played an important role in the broadcast of the 1992 Summer Olympics.

In early 2000, the production center acquired more responsibilities, and became in charge of sports channel Teledeporte. Later, it was put in charge of Cultural·es —shut down in 2010— and TVE HD, TVE's high-definition channel —shut down in 2013—. In 2010, La 2's broadcast was transferred from Madrid to Sant Cugat. Since 13 October 2025, the regional variation of La 2 has considerably increased its programming creating its own entity and identity: La 2 Cat. As 2026, RTVE Catalunya is still RTVE's most important production center outside of Madrid, where RTVE has its headquarters in Prado del Rey and TVE's central news services in Torrespaña; ahead of RTVE's other two production centers: the one in the Canary Islands, and the one in Andalusia.
