= LA1 =

La 1, LA 1 or LA-1 may refer to:

- Louisiana Highway 1, a state highway in Louisiana
- Louisiana State Route 1, a former state highway in Louisiana, also known as the Jefferson Highway
- Louisiana's 1st congressional district, an American congressional district

In broadcasting:

- La 1 (Spanish TV channel), a Spanish TV channel
- RSI La 1, a Swiss Italian-language TV channel
- LA1TV. Lancaster University students' union television station
