= High-definition television transition =

Switchover to HD television or switch-off of SD signals

The transition to high-definition television is a process by which standard-definition (SD) television signals are upgraded to a high-definition (HD) format. In this process, channels usually either simulcast their HD signals alongside the existing SD signals or broadcast exclusively in HD. The transition to the latter is often called the standard-definition television switch-off.

In most territories worldwide, the complete shutdown of the lower-resolution signals has not yet begun or is still in its early stages, notably in the many countries still undergoing the analogue switch-off.

In territories and services where SD signals have already ceased, television sets that do not support terrestrial HD signals are required to be replaced or equipped with set-top boxes compatible with HD signals. In some cases, this switch-off has led to a high demand for new set-top boxes and TV sets, resulting in shortages.

== Transition to HD and SD switch-off now completed ==
=== In Asia ===
- Brunei: Radio Television Brunei began incorporating HD channels by 2010 and fully migrated all its channels to HD digital service on 1 January 2018.
- Indonesia: As of 11 July 2025, all of the Indonesian native channels are now available to air in high definition.
- Singapore: On 10 June 2006, Singapore became the first country in Southeast Asia to begin trials of high-definition television service, involving MediaCorp and cable provider StarHub. The beginning of the trials coincided with the 2006 FIFA World Cup, with StarHub launching HD service for 1,000 participants. It would carry all matches from the tournament in HD, and then two HD trial channels afterward. MediaCorp would launch its terrestrial trial service just over a week later 18 June, carrying a part-time service in prime time with a mix of original and acquired HD programming and films (some of which simulcast from Channel 5), with its inaugural broadcast featuring the film The Lord of the Rings: The Two Towers. On 11 November 2007, the trial service was relaunched as HD5, an HD simulcast of Channel 5. MediaCorp also tested interactive television. In June 2012, after a trial conducted by Mediacorp and StarHub in Ang Mo Kio and Bedok, the Media Development Authority officially announced that Singapore would adopt the DVB-T2 standard, with Mediacorp aiming to make all seven of its free-to-air channels available in digital by the end of 2013, with Channel 5, 8, Suria, and Vasantham also being in high definition. The member countries of the Association of Southeast Asian Nations (ASEAN) agreed to complete their transitions by 2020. As of 11 July 2025, all of the Singaporean native channels are now available to air in high definition.

=== In Europe ===
- Andorra: The first HD channels in Andorra were those offered from Spain, namely TV3, LaSexta, Telecinco and Antena 3. The country's own channel, Andorra Televisió, started broadcasting in HD on 30 September 2019. Regarding the switch-off, most Andorran channels switched off their SD signals in the country on 2 February 2022, with the exception of a few standard definition-only international channels such as Portuguese channels RTP International and TVI International.
- Logo for RAI's former HD channel, closed in 2013 in favour of HD simulcasts of all main channels.
  Italy: The first HD broadcasts in Italy took place in February 2006, during the 2006 Winter Olympics in Turin, when RAI experimentally broadcast some of the events in a 1080i signal. In 2008, RAI broadcast the UEFA Euro 2008 tournament in high definition under a test channel called Rai Test HD (later Rai HD) in the areas of Turin, Rome, Milan, Aosta and Sardinia. Rai HD was closed in favour of simulcast HD versions of the channels on 25 October 2013. Following the switchover to DVB-T2 on 8 March 2022, the HD versions of Italian channels were moved to the top of the list, while the SD versions were positioned from 500 onwards. Channels still broadcasting in SD began to be shut down on 21 December 2022, with the total closure taking place on 1 January 2023, although many channels still carry the HD identifier in their logos. Rai 3 took until May 2023 to be moved to position 3, due to difficulties with regional broadcasts, with the SD version being replaced by Rai News 24 HD.
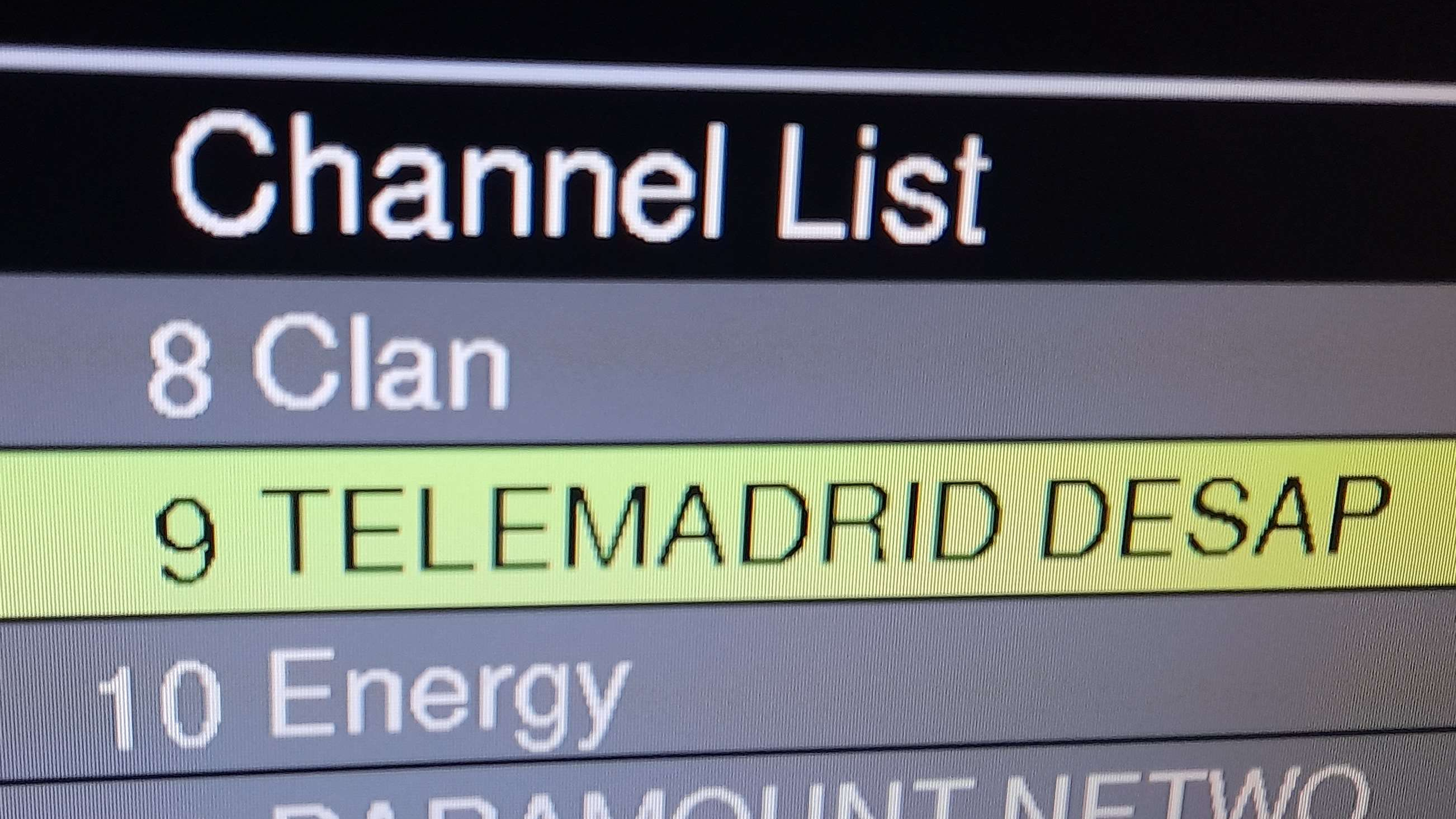
- An outdated TV set only supporting standard definition signals displays the SD feed of local channel Telemadrid with the label "Telemadrid is being phased out" in Castilian.
  Spain: The first television channel to test HD in Spain was Aragón TV, and the first fully HD channel was Televisió de Catalunya's TV3 HD. On 19 June 2009, Televisión Española launched a high-definition channel, first in Valladolid, then in Barcelona and finally statewide, under the name TVE HD. Regarding private broadcasters, the first HD simulcasts were launched by Telecinco on 20 September 2010, followed by Antena 3 on 28 September and La Sexta on 1 November. In April 2016, the first channels with just a high-definition feed began to appear: Atreseries and BeMad TV, as well as the public broadcasts of Real Madrid TV. Originally, the Spanish government planned to require all standard definition broadcasts to cease on 1 January 2023, along with Italy, but the decision was postponed. On 17 January 2023, a decree issued by the Ministry of Digital Transformation set the final closing date at 14 February 2024. The first channel to shut down its SD broadcasts was Extremaduran channel Canal Extremadura on 15 January 2024. It was followed by Canarian Televisión Canaria and all the Catalan channels from Televisió de Catalunya, which did so the next day. TVE closed all its SD channels on 6 February, coinciding with the launch of its 4K channel, TVE UHD, while Telemadrid and the Basque channels from ETB did the switch-off on 8 February. Most regional channels carried out the switch-off on 12 February, with the exception of La 7 in Murcia, which did so on the 13th, just one day before the full closure of SD signals. Most private channels cut out SD signals on 14 February. SD-only channels, such as Boing, Disney Channel, DMAX and DKiss, switched their feeds to HD.
  - Catalonia: The HD version of flagship public channel TV3 was launched on 23 April 2007, being fully implemented in March 2011. On 30 October 2023, channels 3/24, SX3, Esport3 and El 33 started broadcasting in HD online, through the 3Cat platform. In January 2024, Televisió de Catalunya announced the shutdown of all SD signals would take place on 16 January, with the SD version of TV3 being shut down and all the other channels automatically switching their feeds into HD. The Balearic channel IB3, which until then had only broadcast in poor SD quality due to the limited space left in the multiplex, also made the switch to HD on the same day. The switch-off of SD television caused queues and shortages of adapters and television sets across Catalonia.

== Transition to HD started with SD switch-off underway ==
=== In Asia ===
- Azerbaijan: The television switchoff of all SDTV is almost complete.
- Cambodia: TV3 and Bayon TV simulcast in both SD and HD while TVK and Hang Meas are now only in HDTV.
- China: On 1 January 2006, CCTV officially launched a paid HDTV channel via Paksat-MM1 to the whole country. Following the approval of the National Radio and Television Administration, starting from on 28 September 2009, CCTV-1, Beijing Television, Guangdong Television, Heilongjiang Television, Hunan Television, Jiangsu Television, Shanghai Dragon Television, Shenzhen Television and Zhejiang Television began simulcasting of HD signals. On 21 June 2022, the administration stated that the country's television channels will have fully completed the switchover to high-definition by the end of 2025. The Guangzhou Broadcasting Network was the first to completely switch off SD signals in China, following approval on 30 August 2023.
- Malaysia: RTM initiated its inaugural high-definition television (HDTV) trials in 2008, with the Beijing Olympic Games, of which RTM test-broadcast the opening and closing ceremony, and several events on HD. In late 2009, Astro launched Astro B.yond as a personal video recorder and a high-definition television service. As of July 2013, Media Prima group chief financial officer Mohamad Ariff Ibrahim told that Media Prima will launch high definition (HD) simulcast for one of its four terrestrial television stations as early as the first half of year 2014. But, audiences are still suffered with SD resolution and stretched 4:3 scale format in most 16:9 TV that majority people own nowadays. Media Prima only start to broadcast selected programmes at 16:9 SD starting from 31 December 2016, however the idents, programme previews, adverts, 4:3 contents and some widescreen programmes remain on 4:3 and improperly stretched (sometimes letterboxed). In early 2015, NJOI began the HD service that will automatically available for free for all NJOI customers starting from 1 February.
- Mongolia: The transition to HDTV is almost complete. Mongolian Channels are now available in HD only. Although its national broadcaster MNB is still at SD.
- Myanmar: In 2020, MRTV Started to broadcast DVB-T2 and HD, as of right now, Myanmar is currently trying to remove all its SD signals, but the ongoing war may hinder this transition.
- Thailand: The transition is almost complete, Thai PBS and Channel 3 are now on HD only, Mono 29 and some other channels are still at SD only.
- Vietnam: All VTC are exclusively in 1080p HD, The other TV channels simulcast in both HD and SD.

=== In Europe and CIS ===
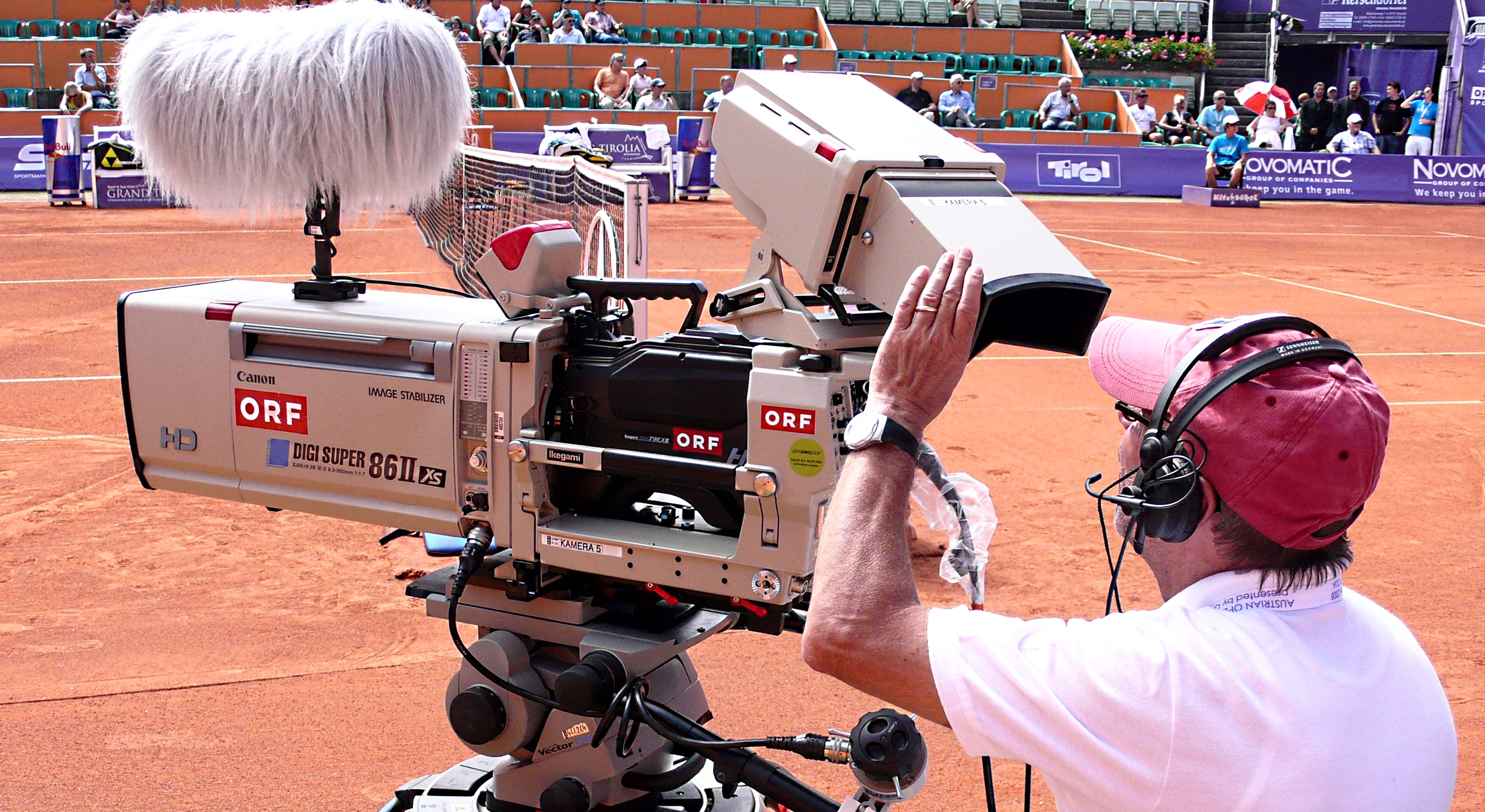
- ORF HD production in Kitzbühel in 2008.
  Austria: ORF 1 began broadcasting HD signals on 1 June 2008 at 17:25 local time, becoming the first German-language public broadcaster in Europe to simulcast its entire programming in HD signals. On 4 December 2023, the SD versions of channels ORF Sport + and ATV ceased broadcasting.
- Belarus: On 29 March 2018, Belarus 1, Belarus 24, NTV and more transitioned from SD to HD broadcasting, as of 2024 most channels in Belarus are broadcasting in exclusively HD, there is currently no switch off date for SD broadcasters.
- Estonia: On 29 June 2009, ETV launched a channel testing high-definition broadcasts. By 1 February 2019, all channels were simulcast in HD. In 2020, Estonian television channels added a tag to SD versions. In December 2021, the Estonian government decided that SD broadcasts would end around the second half of 2024.
- Finland: In May 2011, the high-definition channel Yle HD was launched, being initially broadcast for a few hours in the evening. All of Yle's television channels finally became available in high definition in January 2014. On 24 October 2023, the board of directors of Yle decided that SD signals on its channels would cease to be broadcast in the spring of 2025.
- France: Metropolitan France closed most SD signals on 5 April 2016. In overseas territories, most channels are simulcast in SD or broadcast exclusively in SD.
- Germany: Cultural channel Arte started broadcasting in HD through the Astra satellite on 1 July 2008. ARD and ZDF began testing HD broadcasts on 15 August 2009, with full simulcasts in HD from 12 February 2010. The SD versions of the German channels One, tagesschau24, Arte and Phoenix were closed in November 2022. ARD will follow on 7 January 2025, when Das Erste and the regional channels will discontinue their SD feeds.
- Slovakia: RTVS channels are only in 1080i HDTV, However most other TV channels are simulcasting in both SD and HD, with their SD feeds shrinking in audience.
- United Kingdom: BBC HD began broadcasting on 15 May 2006 as a test channel, officially launching on 1 December 2007. BBC One began an HD simulcast on 3 November 2010, with BBC HD being replaced with a simulcast of BBC Two on 26 March 2013. BBC One HD began broadcasting regional programming in selected regions on 22 March 2023, before rolling out to all areas on 26 April 2023. On 8 January 2024, the BBC switched off its SD signals for all its television channels on the Freesat and Sky satellite plans, which was necessary to be able to include BBC One's regional broadcasts in high definition. The following day, ITV also stopped broadcasting SD channels on these services. To help Freesat users, the BBC launched a test channel allowing users to check the compatibility of their equipment.

=== In the Americas ===
- Costa Rica: There are channels broadcasting in only HD like Repretel 6 and Canal 11 are now only in 1080i HD.
- Honduras: Many television stations across Honduras are turning off their SD feeds to HD only feeds.
- Mexico: Out of all the top 10 most viewed channels in Mexico, Only Canal 5 and A Más are not in 1080i HD only.
- Panama: Many television stations across Panama like RPC and Telemetro have turned off all their SD signals to only HD, There are still smaller television channels still in SD.
- United States: On July 23, 1996, WRAL-TV (the then CBS affiliate in Raleigh, North Carolina; now affiliated with NBC) became the first television station in the United States to broadcast a digital television signal. Currently, HD programming is carried by all major television networks in nearly all DMAs, including ABC, CBS, NBC, FOX, PBS, The CW, MyNetworkTV, Telemundo, Univision, and UniMás; and on many independent stations. All but a select few of cable networks offer an HD broadcast to cable and satellite companies. There is no confirmed switchoff date.

== Transition to HD started ==
=== In Africa ===
- Algeria: On 28 October 2015, EPTV launched its first HD channel, a simulcast of TV3 in high definition, broadcast by the Algerian Broadcasting Company through Nilesat. In 2020, following the transition to digital television, most channels started simulcasting in HD.
- Benin: The Office de Radiodiffusion et Télévision du Bénin broadcasts its contents in HD through satellite and IPTV.
- Botswana: Digital broadcasts from Botswana Television simulcast HD signals.
- Burundi: An HD simulcast of RTNB exists, although most channels still broadcast in SD and 4:3.
- Burkina Faso: The Radio Télévision du Burkina began HD broadcasts through the Canal+ satellite package on 8 November 2022.
- Cape Verde: Broadcaster RTC began broadcasting in HD in June 2023.
- Gabon: Gabon Télévision began HD broadcasts through Canal+ Gabon.
- Gambia: Gambia Radio & Television Service simulcasts HD signals.
- Ghana: A limited number of TV channels in Ghana simulcast in HD, such as GTV and MTA, besides the international channels that already have high-definition broadcasts.
- Ivory Coast: Channel NCI began HD broadcasts through the Canal+ satellite package on 8 November 2022.
- Kenya: Some channels, such as Citizen TV, as well as international channels, are available in high-definition.
- Libya: Some channels are broadcasting HD signals through Nilesat.
- Malawi: The Malawi Broadcasting Corporation broadcasts MBC in HD. The BBC World Service also operates in the country. In 2022, Television Malawi released MBC2 On the Go, focused on high-definition programming.
- Mali: The Office of Radio and Television of Mali started HD simulcasts on terrestrial television on 9 January 2024.
- Mauritius: State broadcaster Mauritius Broadcasting Corporation simulcasts some of its channels in HD.
- Morocco: Public flagship channel Al Aoula had been producing its programmes in HD since 2007, but the SNRT only switched to HD simulcasting in 2015. Most channels, including all SNRT channels, as well as others such as Medi1 TV, are simulcast in HD.
- Mozambique: Televisão de Moçambique simulcasts its content terrestrially in HD. On 31 March 2023, commercial channel Soico Televisão also began HD broadcasts.
- Nigeria: The main channels, both public and commercial, have HD simulcasts.
- Rwanda: Rwanda Television began HD broadcasts through the Canal+ satellite package on 8 November 2022.
- Senegal: Radiodiffusion Télévision Sénégalaise, the state's public broadcaster, is the only one to broadcast all content in HD simulcasts.
- Seychelles: Although the Seychelles Broadcasting Corporation broadcasts exclusively in SD, HD broadcasts are run some international channels through digital terrestrial television and private news channel télésesel, launched through cable on 24 July 2017.
- South Africa: Private broadcaster e.tv began simulcasting HD signals digitally in October 2013. SABC 1 and SABC 3 started their HD channels on 11 June 2018, while SABC 2 did so on 8 August 2018.
- Togo: Togolese Television has an HD broadcast through Canal+'s paid offer.
- Tunisia: The Télévision Tunisienne started simulcasting channels in HD on both satellite and terrestrial on 14 January 2020.

=== In Asia ===
- Bangladesh: BTV channels simulcast in both HD and SD.
- Bhutan: BBS started to broadcast all of its programs in high-definition format on 26 July 2023 with its HD feed of BBS TV being named as BBS HD.
- East Timor: Although its national broadcaster RTTL does not currently have HD signals, Grupo Media Nasional Channel (GMN) has an HD simulcast.
- India: Other than international channels, DD National has an HD network; however, the there are still many channels in SD.
- Laos: In September 2019, with the aid of China, LNTV Channel 3 was upgraded from standard definition to high definition.
- Pakistan: All PTV channels simulcast HD signals.
- Philippines: Many Filipino channels simulcast HD signals, but some like GMA are still at SD.
- Sri Lanka: Starting in November 2022 for Rupavahini and around 2017 for ITN, They began to serve HD simulcast along with their SD signals, but most channels are still in 576i and analog like in Vasantham TV.
- Turkmenistan: There is simulcasting in both SD and HD.

=== In Europe and CIS ===
- Armenia: Armenia TV HD began tested in 2012, with regular full HD (1080p) started in 2013. Public Television of Armenia were switched to High-definition (HD) on 13 September 2016.
- Bulgaria: There is a mix between Simulcast HD and SD and SD only channels.
- Cyprus: Cyprus began HD broadcasts on 1 July 2011.
  - Northern Cyprus: BRT has an HD simulcast.
- Georgia: 1TV began tests broadcasting in HD in 2015, with regular HD broadcasts started on 9 February 2018.
- Greece: ERT HD was launched on 27 April 2011 then it removed on 11 June 2013 replaced by AT HD on 10 July 2013, later on 4 May 2014 began change to NERIT HD then it Removed on 11 June 2015 replaced ERT HD is relaunched at the same day, Later on 1 March 2016, ANT1 began broadcasting in first private HD Broadcaster. the ERT HD was changed to ERT Sports HD on 9 February 2019. if Closed on 1 December 2020, Replaced by ERT1 and ERT2 in HD simulcast.
- Kazakhstan: Some channels are simulcasting in both HD and SD.
- Kyrgyzstan: Some channels are simulcasting in both HD and SD.
- Moldova: Although both Moldova 1 and Moldova 2 are still in 576i, there are some other non Moldovan Channels in Moldova with HD capabilities.
- Romania: TVR HD was launched in Romania in 2008, TVR removed it in 2019 to replace it with TVR 1 HD and TVR 2 HD, other non TVR channels follow suit before or after it.
- Russia: Channels owned by VGTRK and some others are simulcasting in both SD and HD.
- Tajikistan: Despite no deployments of digital television, Televizioni Tojikiston has HD simulcasts.
- Turkey: Kanal D was launched its first HD simulcast on 1 September 2008 with non-state broadcast. Star TV was launched as a second HD simulcast on 29 May 2009. Universal Channel (Turkey) HD simulcast was launched on 1 March 2011, a state-owned broadcaster TRT 1 were changed to 16:9 and launched HD simulcast on 19 May 2012. teve2 was launched in HD simulcast in February 2013. And TV8 was launched in HD simulcast in June 2014.
- Ukraine: There is a mix between simulcast HD and SD and SD only channels.
- Uzbekistan: Some channels like O'zbekistan are simulcasting in both HD and SD.

=== In the Middle East ===
- Israel: Channel 1 launched an HD simulcast on 1 April 2011 later in 2013 began switched to 16:9.

=== In the Americas ===
- El Salvador: There are channels that are simulcasting in both HD and SD like Canal 2.

== Transition to HD not yet started or planned ==
=== In Africa ===
- Angola: Television is still essentially analogue and in SD, but preparations for creating HD content are underway.
- Cameroon: Although Cameroon Radio Television started digital broadcasts besides the analogue ones, these remain exclusively in SD.
- Central African Republic: Télévision Centrafricaine broadcasts exclusively in SD.
- Chad: Broadcasting exclusively in SD as the country has not started a digital television transition.
- Comoros: Although the Office de radio et télévision des Comores started digital broadcasts besides the analogue ones in 2015, these remain exclusively in SD.
- Djibouti: Radio Television of Djibouti still broadcasts analogue SD signals.
- Equatorial Guinea: Broadcasting exclusively in SD as the country has not started a digital television transition.
- Eritrea: Broadcasting exclusively in SD as the country has not started a digital television transition.
- Eswatini: Although the country has switched off its analogue broadcasts, Eswatini TV continues to broadcast exclusively SD signals as of March 2024.
- Guinea: Broadcasting exclusively in SD as the country has not started a digital television transition.
- Guinea-Bissau: Broadcasting exclusively in SD as the country has not started a digital television transition.
- Lesotho: Several international television channels broadcast in the country, but Lesotho Television, the country's only television channel, still exclusively broadcasts in SD.
- Liberia: Broadcasting exclusively in SD as the country has not started a digital television transition.
- Madagascar: No HD broadcasts, still undergoing digital transition.
- Mauritania: Television of Mauritania broadcasts exclusively in SD, both terrestrially and through satellite (Arabsat).
- Namibia: Although the country has switched off its analogue broadcasts, all channels from the Namibian Broadcasting Corporation continue to broadcast exclusively SD signals as of March 2024.
- Niger: Although the country started digital broadcasts in 2018 besides the analogue ones, these remain exclusively in SD, both terrestrially and through satellite.
- Republic of the Congo: No HD broadcasts, still undergoing digital transition.
- São Tomé and Príncipe: Broadcasting exclusively in SD as the country has not started a digital television transition.
- Sierra Leone: Broadcasting exclusively in SD as the country has not started a digital television transition.
- Somalia: Somali National Television broadcasts exclusively in SD, both terrestrially and through satellite.
- Somaliland: Broadcasting exclusively in SD as the country has not started a digital television transition.

=== In the Americas ===
- Belize: Still broadcasting exclusively in SD as the country has not started a digital television transition.
- Guatemala: Still broadcasting exclusively in SD as the country has not started a digital television transition.
- Guyana: Still broadcasting exclusively in SD as the country has not started a digital television transition.
- Nicaragua: Still broadcasting exclusively in SD as the country has not started a digital television transition.
