= IB Sat =

Television channel in the Balearic Islands

- Country: Balearic Islands
- Broadcast area: Worldwide

Programming
- Language: Catalan
- Picture format: 1080i HDTV

Ownership
- Owner: Televisió de les Illes Balears

History
- Launched: 2007

Links
- Website: www.ib3tv.com

Availability

Terrestrial
- DTTV: Barcelona: 44 UHF; Girona: 52 UHF; Lleida: 52 UHF; Tarragona: 36 UHF

Streaming media
- Official Website: IB Sat

IB Sat (Catalan pronunciation: [ˈi ˈβe ˈsat]) is a Balearic television channel operated by Televisió de les Illes Balears.
