= Betevé =

betevé
- Country: Spain
- Broadcast area: Barcelonès
- Headquarters: Barcelona

Programming
- Language: Catalan
- Picture format: 1080i (16:9 HDTV)

Ownership
- Owner: City Council of Barcelona

History
- Launched: 3 November 1994
- Former names: Barcelona Televisió (1994–2017)

Links
- Website: https://beteve.cat/

Betevé, stylized betevé, formerly called Barcelona Televisió, is a Spanish free-to-air television channel in the Catalan language, that is broadcast in Barcelona and Barcelonès, owned by the City Council of Barcelona.

== History ==
During the government of Pasqual Maragall, the municipal television system of Barcelona was launched, however, originally there were 10 different channels, one for each urban district of the city, on November 3, 1994, the city council decided to unify the ten channels into a single one called Barcelona Televisió with the aim of providing legal coverage to the local public television system, since the district television stations broadcast in an illegal situation as they did not have the respective official licenses. From its foundation it was decided that the channel would be broadcast in Catalan.

In 1997, the first reform of the channel was carried out, it began to broadcast public service programming aimed at a minority audience, which included debate programs, independent films, a cultural agenda and even newscasts aimed at immigrants residing in Barcelona. In 2001, the programming of newscasts and long-term programs increased, which brought the channel closer to achieving a figure close to 1% share. In 2005 BTV began its broadcasts in the Digital terrestrial television, being the first local television channel in Spain to implement the new technology.

In 2014 BTV increased its coverage by assuming the management of the local public radio station, called Barcelona FM. In 2017 the most recent reform of the channel was carried out, the channel was renamed as betevé and the programming was focused on information, public service and proximity, as well as cinema and sports in some time slots.

In October 2019, the channel gained national and international notoriety by the live coverage of the demonstrations that took place in Barcelona in reaction to the judicial conviction of nine Catalan pro-independence leaders.

== Programming ==
Betevé's programming is focused on the city of Barcelona and its surrounding area, which is why informative, public service and local programs occupy a large part of the daily programming. Additionally, the channel also broadcasts movies and sporting events of the local teams that play in the lower categories of Spanish football as CE Europa, UE Sant Andreu or UE Sants. The own production programming is broadcast in Catalan, however, some films or television series are broadcast in Spanish due to the absence of Catalan dubbed versions of these productions.
