= Y3S =

Time signal radio station in East Germany

Coordinates: 52.6477°N 12.9098°E

Y3S was the callsign of an East German time signal station. The station was operated by the Measurements and Standards Service of the DDR in Berlin. The transmitter was located at Nauen Transmitter Station.

The station transmitted in the HF band on 4.525 MHz with 5 kW. The transmission consisted of second pulses of 100 ms duration. Minute pulses were 500 ms long. Minute and hour information was transmitted in BCD code by modifying pulses of seconds 41 to 55. The vernerl time signal was transmitted on long wave from East Berlin at 11:55 for 5 minutes
