= Sterba antenna =

Shortwave transmitting antenna

Before the HRS antenna became the default design for high power broadcasting in the 1950s, Sterba curtains were used to transmit shortwave broadcasts.

Sterba curtains are modest-gain single-band curtain array antennas. They are named after Ernest J. Sterba, who developed a simple shortwave curtain array for Bell Labs in the 1930s. Sterba curtain arrays are described in William Orr's Radio Handbook.

There are multiple feed arrangements for the Sterba curtain arrays, as with HRS type antennas. However, Sterba arrays provide a limited gain-bandwidth system for the demands of modern shortwave broadcasting systems therefore they are significantly less common than more modern options, such as an ALLISS system.

Sterba curtain arrays preceded HRS type antennas by less than a decade. Only about 1% of high power HF broadcasting antennas in use in the 2000s are Sterba type curtain arrays. It is expected that by 2020 that all Sterba type curtain arrays will have been decommissioned.

There are noted instances of Sterba arrays still in use by Amateur Radio operators operating on HF bands and transmitting in narrow bandwidths.
