= Climate Resilience Certificate =

A Climate Resilience Certificate is a proposed European instrument aimed at standardising the assessment and demonstration of resilience to climate-related risks in real estate. It was introduced in a research project at RISE in Sweden in 2021 and presented in a report in 2023.

The concept was referenced in the European Commission’s Climate Resilience Dialogue final report. Within that dialogue, the idea of Climate Resilience Certificates in Sweden appeared as an example of a standardised climate‑risk assessment for real estate. In the final report it was listed as a proposed action to "consider introducing climate resilience certificates and/or a requirement to provide information on climate hazards to prospective house buyers and renters".

== Discussion in different countries ==
=== Denmark and Germany ===
It has also been discussed in the European Covered Bond Council publication The ECBC Covered Bond Fact Book 2025 by representatives from Danske Bank and the German association for mortgage lending banks.

=== Sweden ===
The trade organisation for insurance companies Svensk försäkring and RISE have promoted Climate Resilience Certificates on a European level in response to a public inquiery proposing not to have a national Climate Resilience Certifigates system at the moment. Major Swedish newspapers have also mentioned Climate Resilience Certificates (Klimatresiliensdeklarationer in Swedish) as a potential future scheme to strengthening the incentives for climate adaptation, and provide banks, insurance companies and investors with a standardised classification for reporting.
