= ECBC =

ECBC may refer to:

- Energy Conservation Building Code, in India
- European Covered Bond Council, a financial organization
- Edgewood Chemical Biological Center, a research facility of the U.S. Army
- Enterprise Cape Breton Corporation
- Exeter College Boat Club, an Oxford University college rowing club
- ECBC-MAC, a technique for constructing a message authentication code.
