= Climate Resilience Dialogue =

EU commission work on climate resilience

The Climate Resilience Dialogue was an initiative by the European Commission launched in 2021 aimed at addressing the financial impacts of climate change and enhancing climate change adaptation efforts. The initiative was announced in the EU Adaptation Strategy and the Strategy for financing the transition to a sustainable economy. The Dialogue focused on narrowing the climate protection gap, which is the difference between the financial losses caused by climate-related disasters and the amount covered by insurance.

The Dialogue was co-chaired by the Directorate-General for Climate Action and the Directorate-General for Financial Stability, Financial Services and Capital Markets Union and was part of the EU Strategy on Adaptation to Climate Change. Seventeen organizations participated, representing a wide range of stakeholders, including insurers (e.g. AMICE and Insurance Europe) and consumer representatives. The group was organized into two sub-groups: Insurance Underwriting and Solutions, and Adaptation Investment. AMICE worked on a “leave no one behind” principle in their contributions to the work in the Climate Resilience Dialogue and believed that it provided a forum to hear diverse views on climate change impacts, unite in understanding societal needs, and address these challenges.

Throughout 2023 and 2024, several meetings were held and reports were published. The Interim Report from July 2023 outlined the work carried out since November 2022, while the Final Report from July 2024 summarized insights and recommendations from the Dialogue. Based on the analysis of factors contributing to the climate protection gap, the Climate Resilience Dialogue proposed actions for various stakeholders to enhance climate resilience by promoting risk awareness, preparedness, and proactive measures.

== The final report ==
After the final report was released, proposals have been made to establish a permanent Expert Group on Climate Protection Gaps to put forward policy recommendations for the next EU Adaptation Strategy. The report identifies the need to actively explore the potential for new public-private collaboration schemes, at the European Union or national level, and such partnerships have been supported by EIOPA "as they can promote risk prevention and adaptation, reduce the cost of the risk transfer ex ante and incentivise the supply of and demand for insurance".

=== Response to the report ===
As some in the insurance sector point out, community engagement is crucial to ensuring that adaptation measures are sustainable and tailored to the specific needs of the population. Education and information programs can help people better understand climate-related risks and prepare appropriately. Insurance Europe, the group representing European insurance associations, has supported these recommendations in its recent requests to the European Union. Others call for the promotion of open markets and removing trade barriers regulators will be able to unlock the full potential of re/insurers on the path to effectively and sustainably reducing protection gaps.

It has been some criticism that there is little in the report on how to spur climate adaptation investment with the argument that this is key to lowering insured losses and maintaining insurance affordability. Initiatives in light of the dialogue according to some potentially pave the way for a more proactive approach from the European Banking Authority on climate change adaptation. The European Commission, based on the Climate Resilience Dialogue, will convene a temporary study group to mobilize climate resilience finance with key industry and financial stakeholders. The Federation of European Rism Management Associations (FERMA) has called for permanent expert group to address deficiencies in climate protection and develop policy recommendations for the EU's next climate adaptation strategy.

The European Environment Agency has mentioned that the outcomes underscored a need for public-private partnerships, innovative risk reduction strategies and closer alignment between climate resilience and insurance systems.

=== Actions taken ===
EIOPA has suggested amendments to NatCat data templates referring to the final report.

The Swedish research institute RISE has continued working on the Climate Resilience Certificates, that was mentioned in the final report, together with banks, insurance companies and others.
