= Wilhelm Albrecht =

German engineer

Wilhelm Eduard Adolf Albrecht (February 7, 1902 in Tempelhof near Berlin – May 22, 1962 in Berlin) was a German engineer. He became known for his devices for professional film and television sound recording, processing and post-production.

== Childhood and adolescence ==
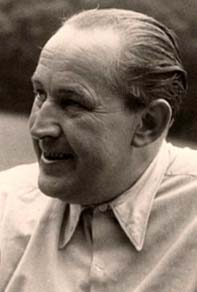
Wilhelm Albrecht (about 1955)

Wilhelm Albrecht was the youngest of five children of the businessman Wilhelm Ernst August Albrecht from Arneburg (1859–1913) and his wife Wära Nikolajewna, née Stieglitz, from Russia (1863-1905). After the early death of his parents, he was taken into the care of Carl Gustav Franke and his family, close friends to his parents. From early childhood, he put his technical talent into practice, not always to the delight of adults. For instance, a police report was made because of an antenna he had secretly installed on the roof, allowing him to receive radio signals from the Nauen Transmitter Station.

Having attended Schloss Bischofstein boarding school in Thuringia, a school established by Gustav Marseille, one of the leaders in progressive education, and upper secondary school in Berlin-Lichterfelde, he completed an internship with the car manufacturer Opel and trained as a mechanical engineer at the Technicum Strelitz.

== Working life ==
In 1926, he founded Mechanical Workshops Wilhelm Albrecht and then developed and manufactured components for radio receivers, which were initially supplied to end users, later to industrial companies (e. g. Blaupunkt). Significant developments in the field of communication technology (e. g. low-loss cable connections) were created for customers such as Reichspostzentralamt (Central Post Office) and Deutsche Fernkabel-Gesellschaft, a company established to develop the German long-distance telecommunications network.

However, he also built high-speed crafts using waterproof, film-glued plywood for the body, a material which in those days was mainly utilized for buoyancy chambers .

He also constructed boat engines and surfboards, on which one stood freehand. The Berliner Museum für Verkehr und Technik (now the German Museum of Technology) added a boat and a surf board to its collection of exhibits.

Immediately after the war, affected by the lack of all kind of everyday necessities, he designed and manufactured items such as lighters, coffee roasting pans, tobacco cutting machines, etc. The production was possible because factory rooms, machines and material were largely undamaged respectively not looted.

At the same time Albrecht came into contact with the film industry and recognized the need for development in the field of film sound in which the complex and expensive optical sound process was used throughout.

With his design of the MTK 1 Magnetton-Kamera (magnetic sound camera) an epoch-making development for the practical use of the magnetic sound technology had been achieved.

It was introduced to the professional world in 1950 and was praised by Universum Film AG (UfA) as a “masterpiece of modern film equipment construction, and also in a new area of sound film technology”. This first camera was in use at the UfA Studios until 1970.

Albrecht's MTK 1 was the basis for all future and significant developments of the facilities and systems required for sound recording, processing and post-production in film and television studios. Besides, Albrecht designed some pioneering developments in the field of record technology in the 1950s.

He had succeeded in conveying his rousing passion for technical innovations to his employees - and so his life's work and thus the MWA success story could continue for the next decades even after his death (1962). Later on his enterprise was overtaken by its successor

== Personal life ==
Albrecht was married twice. He had a daughter with his second wife.
