= Curtain array =

Class of large multielement directional wire radio transmitting antennas

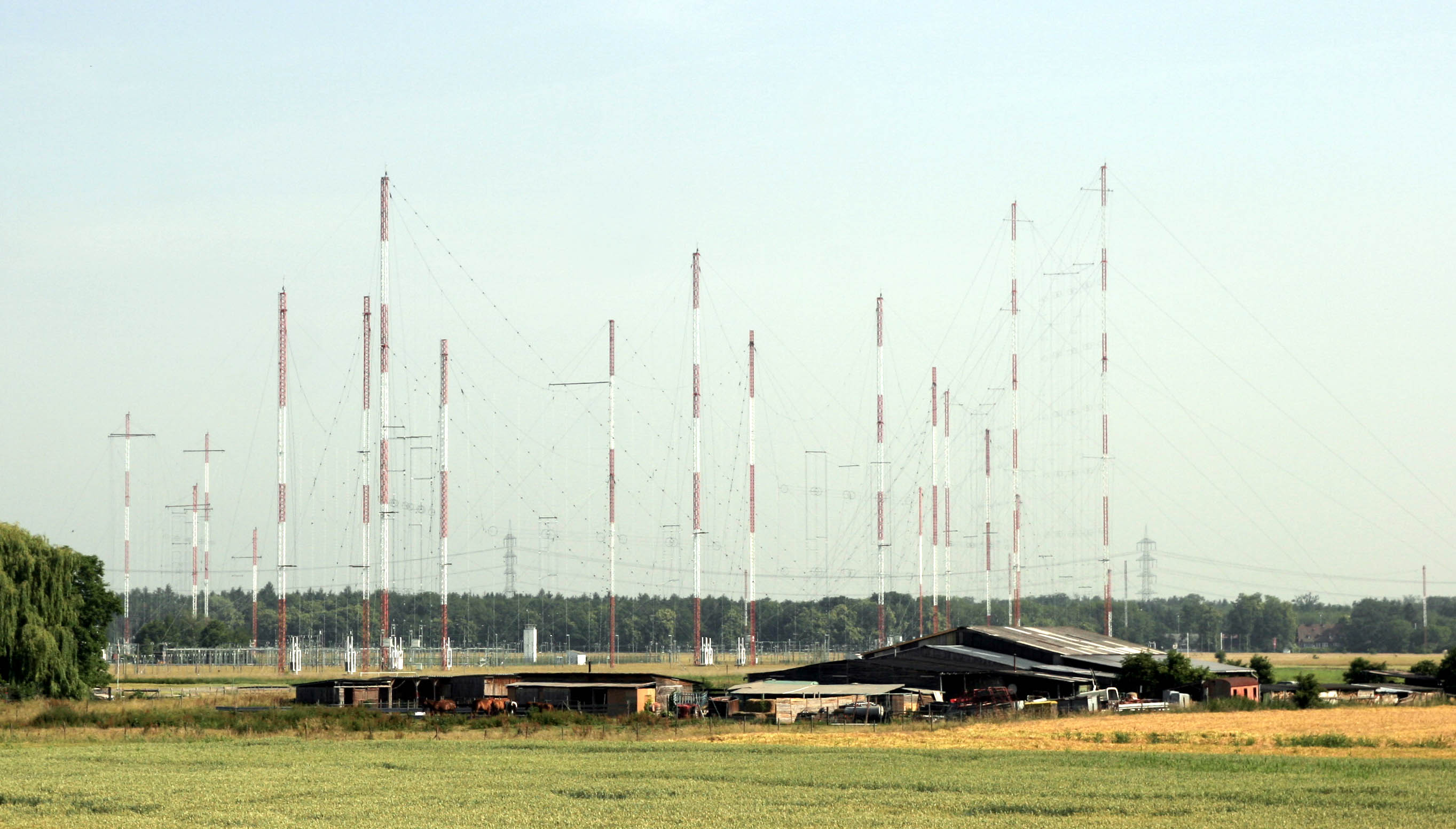
Curtain arrays at Radio Free Europe transmitter site, Biblis, Germany

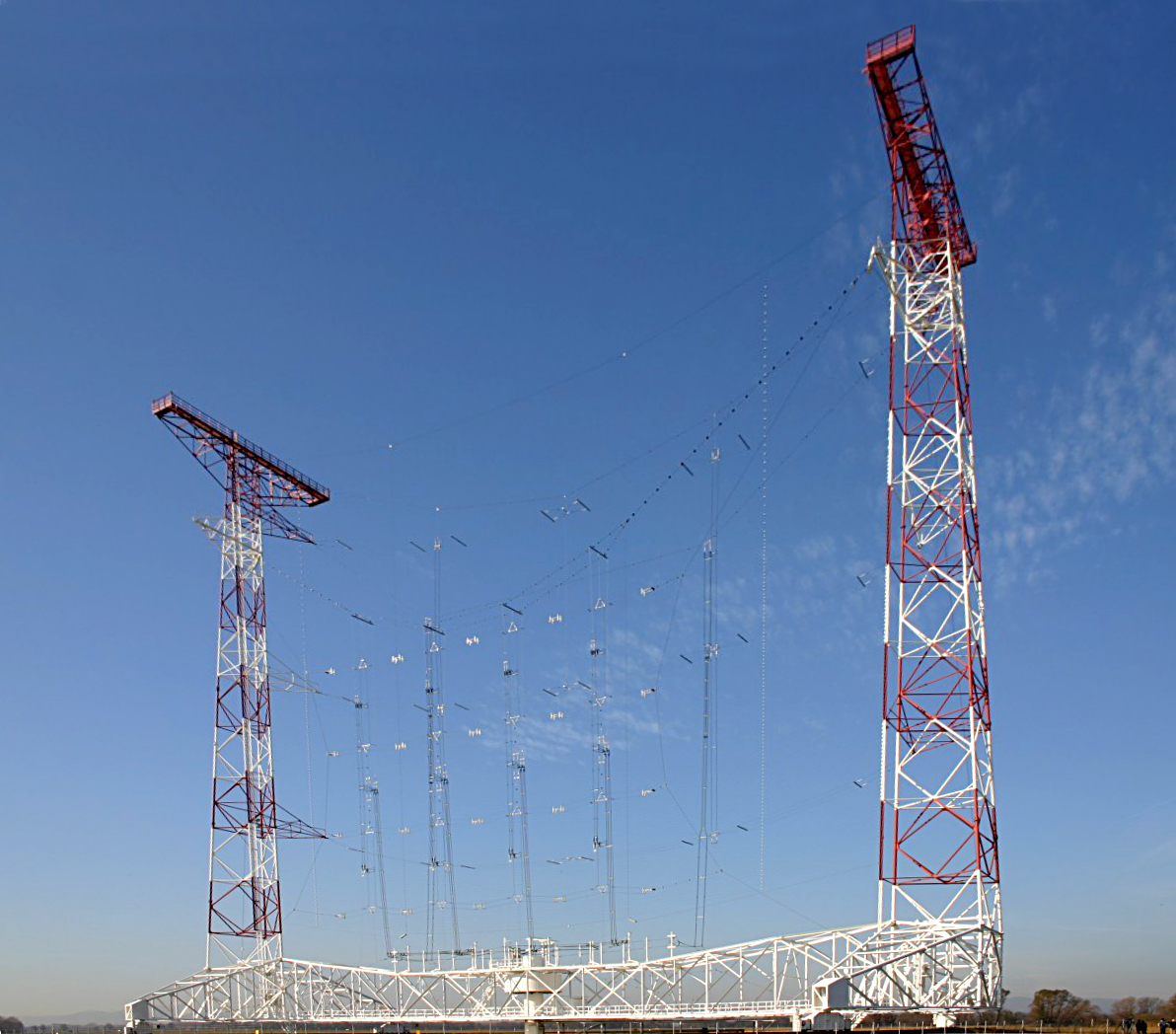
Curtain array at international shortwave broadcasting station, Moosbrunn, Austria. It consists of 4 columns of horizontal wire dipoles, suspended in front of a wire screen. The vertical parallel wire feedlines to each column of dipoles are visible. The entire antenna is mounted on a rotating truss structure, allowing it to be pointed in different directions.

Curtain arrays are a class of large multielement directional radio transmitting wire antennas, used in the short-wave radio bands. They constitute a type of reflective array antenna, consisting of multiple wire dipole antennas, suspended in a vertical plane, often positioned in front of a "curtain" reflector made of a flat vertical screen of many long parallel wires. These are suspended by support wires strung between pairs of tall steel towers, reaching heights of up to 90 m (300 feet) high. Primarily employed for long-distance skywave (or skip) transmission, they emit a beam of radio waves at a shallow angle into the sky just above the horizon, which is then reflected by the ionosphere back to Earth beyond the horizon. Curtain arrays are extensively used by international short-wave radio stations for broadcasting to large areas at transcontinental distances.

Due to their powerful directional characteristics, curtain arrays are frequently utilized by government propaganda radio stations to beam propaganda broadcasts across national borders into other nations. For instance, curtain arrays were used by Radio Free Europe and Radio Liberty to broadcast into Eastern Europe.

== History ==
Curtain arrays were originally developed during the 1920s and 1930s when there was a lot of experimentation with long distance shortwave broadcasting. The underlying concept was to achieve improvements in gain and/or directionality over the simple dipole antenna, possibly by folding one or more dipoles into a smaller physical space, or to arrange multiple dipoles such that their radiation patterns reinforce each other, thus concentrating more signal into a given target area.

In the early 1920s, Guglielmo Marconi, pioneer of radio, commissioned his assistant Charles Samuel Franklin to carry out a large scale study into the transmission characteristics of short wavelength radio waves and to determine their suitability for long-distance transmissions. Franklin invented the first curtain array aerial system in 1924, known as the 'Franklin' or 'English' system.

Other early curtain arrays included the Bruce array patented by Edmond Bruce in 1927, and the Sterba curtain, patented by Ernest J. Sterba in 1929. The Bruce array produces a vertically polarised signal; Sterba arrays (and the later HRS antennas) produce a horizontally-polarised signal.

The Sterba curtain was the first curtain antenna to achieve wide use, it was used by Bell Telephone and other telephone companies during the 1930s and 1940s for transoceanic telephone connections. However it is a narrowband design and is only steerable by mechanical means.

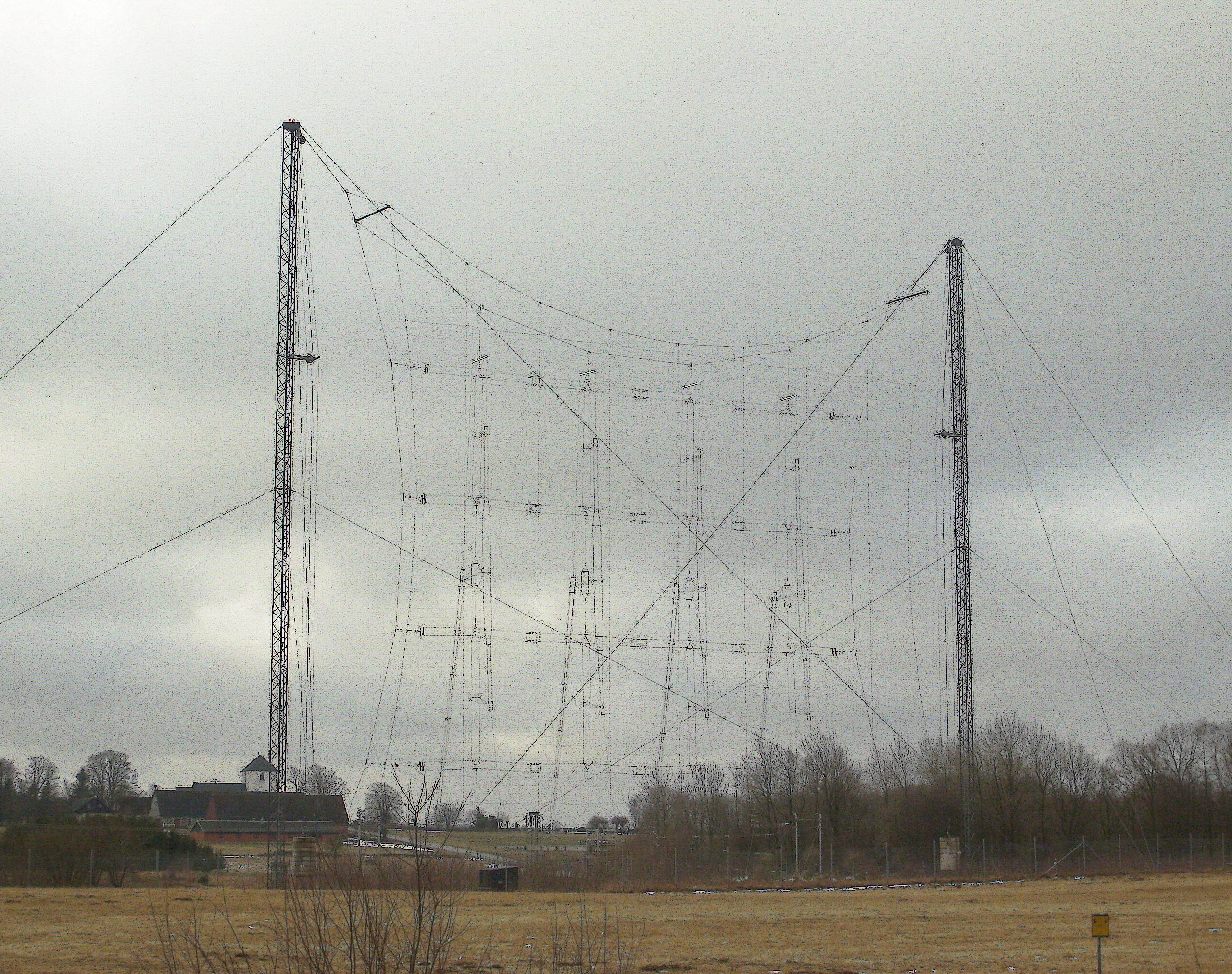
Antenna G1 at Hörby shortwave station, which was operated by Radio Sweden but was shut down in 2011. It consisted of 16 horizontal wire dipoles in a 4×4 array, suspended in front of a wire screen. Each of the 4 columns of dipoles is fed by a separate open-wire transmission line, which can be seen exiting at an angle from the center of each column. The diagonal wires in the foreground are guy wires. The CCIR designation for this type of antenna (below) is HR 4/4/0.5

Curtain arrays were used in some of the first radar systems, such as Britain's Chain Home network. During the Cold War, large curtain arrays were used by the Voice of America, Radio Free Europe, and Radio Liberty, and analogous Western European organizations, to beam propaganda broadcasts into communist countries, which censored Western media.

== Description ==
The driven elements are usually half-wave dipoles, fed in phase, mounted in a plane 1 / 4 wavelength in front of the reflector plane. The reflector wires are oriented parallel to the dipoles. The dipoles may be vertical, radiating in vertical polarization, but are most often horizontal, because horizontally polarized waves are less absorbed by earth reflections. The lowest row of dipoles are mounted more than 1 / 2 wavelength above the ground, to prevent ground reflections from interfering with the radiation pattern. This allows most of the radiation to be concentrated in a narrow main lobe aimed a few degrees above the horizon, which is ideal for skywave transmission. A curtain array may have a gain of 20 dB greater than a simple dipole antenna. Because of the strict phase requirements, earlier curtain arrays had a narrow bandwidth, but modern curtain arrays can be built to cover up to a 2:1 frequency ratio, allowing them to cover several shortwave bands.

Rather than feeding each dipole at its center, which requires a "tree" transmission line structure with complicated impedance matching, multiple dipoles are often connected in series to make an elaborate folded dipole structure which can be fed at a single point.

In order to allow the beam to be steered, sometimes the entire array is suspended by cantilever arms from a single large tower which can be rotated. See ALLISS-Antenna. Alternatively, some modern versions are constructed as phased arrays in which the beam can be slewed electronically, without moving the antenna. Each dipole or group of dipoles is fed through an electronically adjustable phase shifter, implemented either by passive networks of capacitors and inductors which can be switched in and out, or by separate output RF amplifiers. Adding a constant phase shift between adjacent horizontal dipoles allows the direction of the beam to be slewed in azimuth up to ±30° without losing its radiation pattern.

=== Three-array systems ===
Transmission system are optimized for geopolitical reasons. Geopolitical necessity leads some international broadcasters to occasionally use three separate antenna arrays: highband and midband, as well as lowband HRS curtains.

Using three curtain arrays to cover the HF broadcasting spectrum creates a highly optimized HF transmission system, but three or more curtain arrays can be costly to build and maintain, and no new HF relay stations have been built since the mid-1990s. The modern HRS antenna design has a long lifespan, however, so existing HRS shortwave transmission systems built before 1992 will likely remain available for some time.

== Nomenclature ==
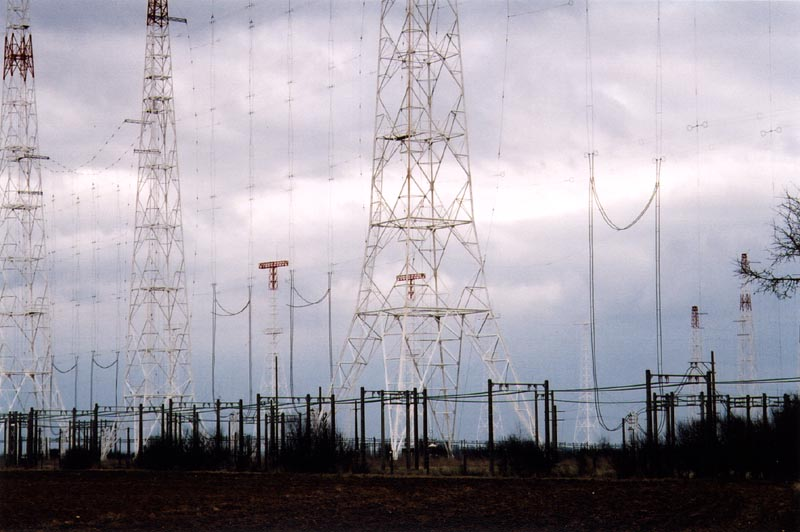
Former Radio France Internationale (RFI) Issoudun Relay station feeders and curtain arrays

Since 1984 the CCIR has created a standardised nomenclature for describing curtain antennas, CCIR HF Transmitting Antennas consisting of 1 to 4 letters followed by three numbers:

First letter
Indicates the orientation of the dipoles in the array.

- "H" indicates the dipoles are oriented horizontally, so the antenna radiates horizontally polarized radio waves.
- "V" indicates the dipoles are oriented vertically, so the antenna radiates vertically polarized radio waves.

Second letter (if present)
Indicates whether the antenna has a reflector.

- "R" indicates that there is a simple (passive) reflector on one side of the array, so the antenna radiates a single beam.
- "RR" indicates that the array has some kind of "reversible reflector", so the direction of the beam can be switched 180°. Very few of this type have ever been built. RCI Sackville in Canada may have 2 HRRS type antennas—perhaps the only ones in North America.
- If "R" and "RR" are missing, the antenna has no reflector, so the dipole array will radiate its energy in two beams in both directions perpendicular to its plane, 180° apart.

Third letter (if present)

- "S" indicates that the array is steerable.

Numbers
Following the letters are three numbers: "x/y/z". "x" and "y" specifies the dimensions of the rectangular array of dipoles, while "z" gives the height above the ground of the bottom of the array:

- "x" (an integer) is the number of collinear dipoles in each horizontal row. (The number of columns in the array)
- "y" (an integer) is the number of vertically arranged dipoles in each column. (The number of rows in the array)
- "z" (a decimal fraction) is the height above ground in wavelengths of the lowest row of dipoles in the array.

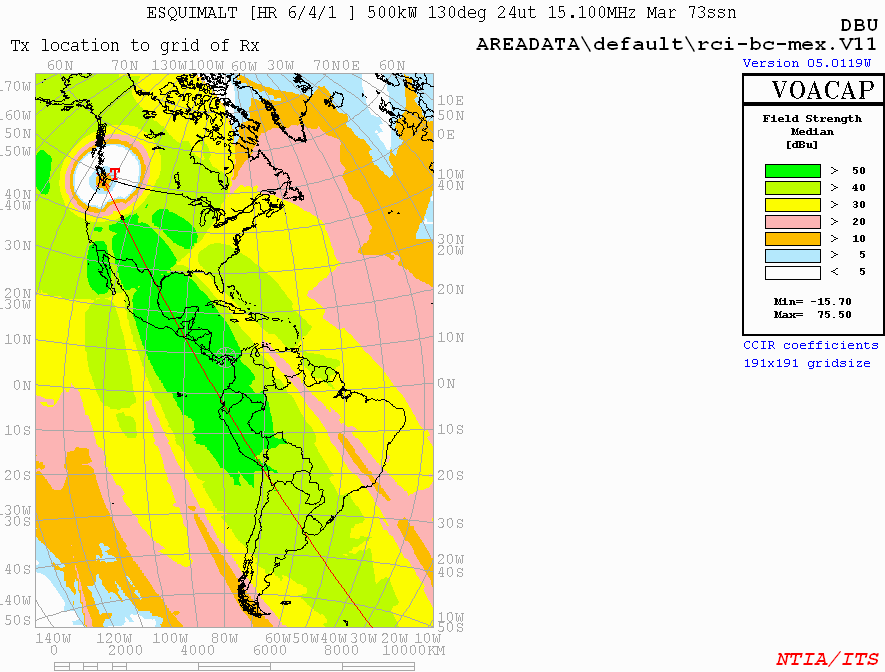
Simulated radiation pattern of a 15.1 MHz HR 6/4/1 curtain antenna (24 horizontal dipoles organized in 4 rows of 6 elements each, in front of a reflector), driven by a 500 kW transmitter. The transmitter is located in Esquimalt and the pattern covers Central America and parts of South America, showing the long distances achieved with this antenna. The main lobe of the pattern is flanked by two sidelobes, which appear curved due to the global map projection.

For example, a "HRS 4/5/0.5" curtain antenna has a rectangular array of 20 dipoles, 4 dipoles wide and 5 dipoles high, with the lowest row being half a wavelength off the ground, and a flat reflector behind it, and the direction of the beam can be slewed. An HRS 4/4/0.5 slewable antenna with 16 dipoles is one of the standard types of array seen at shortwave broadcast stations worldwide.

Notes on HRS nomenclature

- HRS antennas of type HRS 1/1/z are undefined as such (such a thing would consist of just a single dipole).
- HRS antennas of type HRS 1/2/z and 2/1/z exist, but see little practical use in shortwave broadcasting. An antenna with the designation of "H 1/2/z" is commonly referred to as a "Lazy-H" antenna. VHF and UHF repeaters for FM radio or television in the UK quite often employ a pair of horizontal dipoles (or short yagis) one above the other (i.e. HRS 1/2/z) to concentrate transmission power in the vertical plane.
- The Russian Duga Over The Horizon Radar may have used an antenna of type HRS 32/16/0.75 (estimated – not verified), with potential directional ERP in the gigawatt range.

== HRS antenna ==
The HRS type antenna is one of the most common types of curtain array. The name comes from the above CCIR nomenclature: it consists of an array of Horizontal dipoles with a Reflector behind them, and the beam is Steerable. These antennas are also known as "HRRS" (for a Reversible Reflector), but the extra R is seldom used.

However, as far back as the mid-1930s, Radio Netherlands was using a rotatable HRS antenna for global coverage. Since the 1950s the HRS design has become more or less the standard for long distance (> 1000 km) high power shortwave broadcasting.

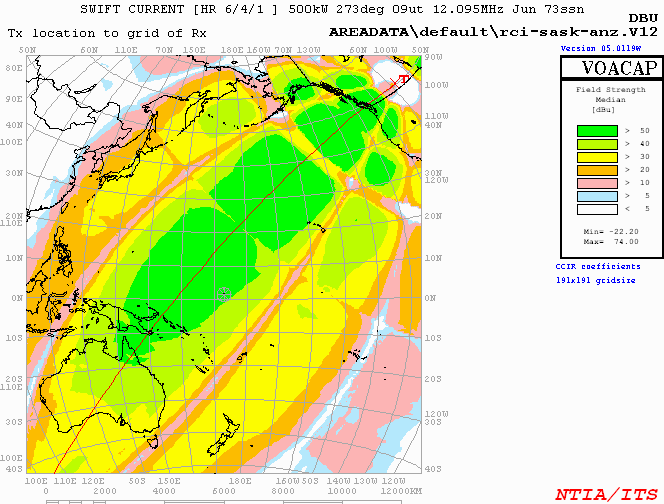
Example of a simulated HRS antenna radiation pattern from a shortwave relay station in Canada. It consists of a main lobe with two major sidelobes. The sidelobes look curved because of the map projection.

=== HRS description ===
An HRS type antenna is basically a rectangular array of conventional dipole antennas strung between supporting towers. In the simplest case, each dipole is separated from the next by 1/2 λ vertically, and the centres of each dipole are spaced 1 λ apart horizontally. Again, in the simplest case (for a broadside beam), all dipoles are driven in phase with each other and with equal power. Radiation is concentrated broadside to the curtain.

Behind the array of dipoles, typically about 1/3 λ away there will be a "reflector" consisting of many parallel wires in the same orientation as the dipoles. If this was not present, the curtain would radiate equally forward and backward.

== Steering ==
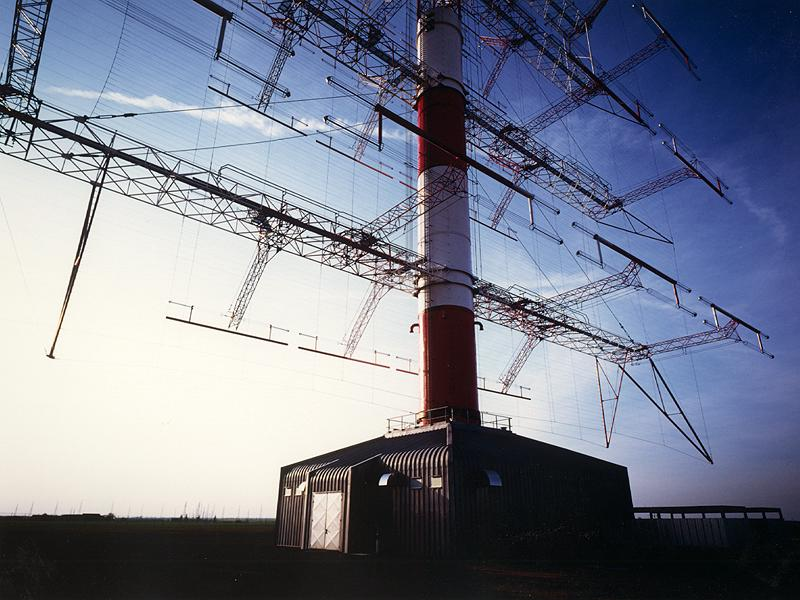
ALLISS antenna as viewed underneath

If there is an "S" in the antenna's designation, it is a steerable design. Following the ITU-recommendation, it might be called 'slewable design'. This might be achieved electronically by adjustment of the electrical wave phases of the signals fed to the columns of dipole antenna elements, or physically by mounting the antenna array on a large rotating mechanism. An example of this can be seen at NRK Kvitsøy, where a circular railway carries a pair of wheeled platforms, each of which supports a tower at opposite ends of a diameter-arm. The curtain antenna array is suspended between the towers and rotates with them as the towers go around the circular railway. Another physical rotation technique is employed by the ALLISS system where the entire array is built around a central rotatable tower of great strength.

Electrically slewed antenna arrays can usually be aimed in the range of ±30° from the antenna's physical direction while mechanically rotated arrays can accommodate a full 360°. Electrical slewing is typically done in the horizontal plane, with some adjustment being possible in the vertical plane.

== Azimuth beamwidth ==
- For a 2-wide dipole array, the beamwidth is around 50°
- For a 3-wide dipole array, the beamwidth is around 40°
- For a 4-wide dipole array, the beamwidth is around 30°

== Vertical launch angle ==
The number of dipole rows and the height of the lowest element above ground determine the elevation angle and consequently the distance to the service area.

- A 2-row high array has a typical takeoff angle of 20°

is most commonly used for medium range communications.

- A 4-row high array has a typical takeoff angle of 10°

is most commonly used for long range communications.

- A 6-row array is similar to a 4-row, but can achieve 5° to 10° takeoff angles.

can be used in shortwave communications circuits of 12000 km, and is highly directional.

Note that it is possible for details of the antenna site to wreak havoc with the designers plans such that takeoff angle and matching may be adversely affected.

== Examples of HRS antennas ==
This is an example of theoretical HRS design shortwave relay stations. This may help one better understand HRS antenna directivity.

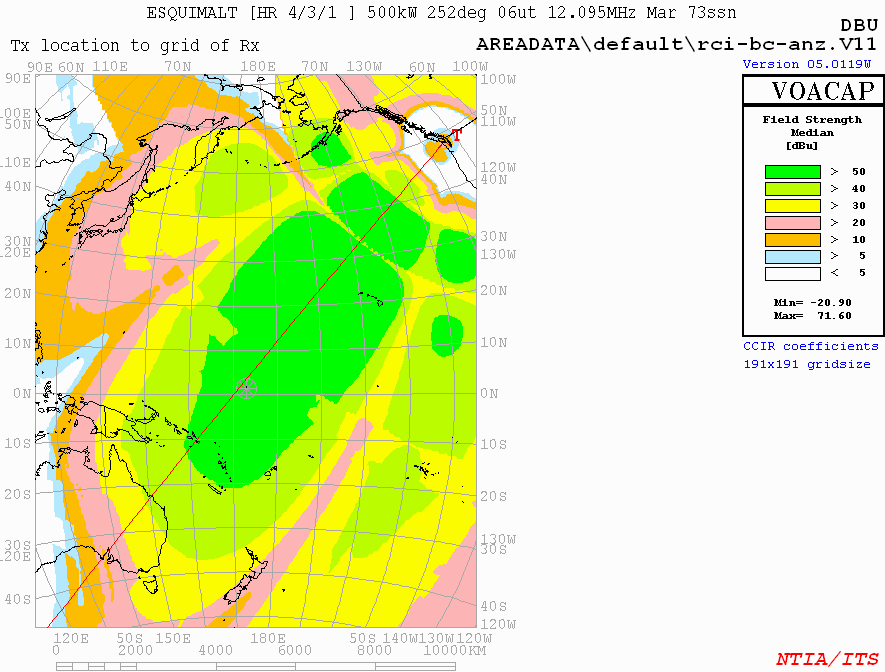
Targeting Australasia

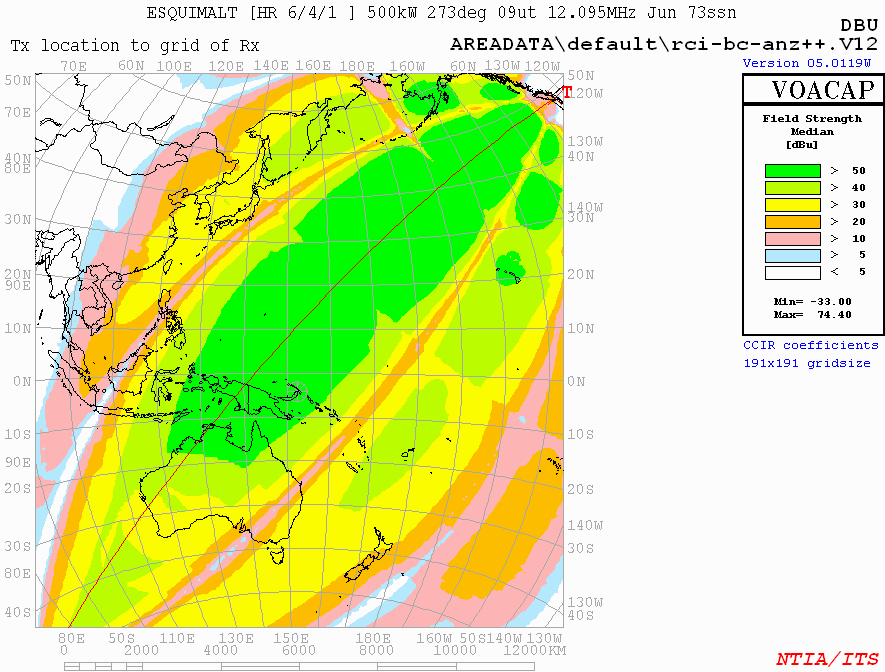
Targeting Indonesia

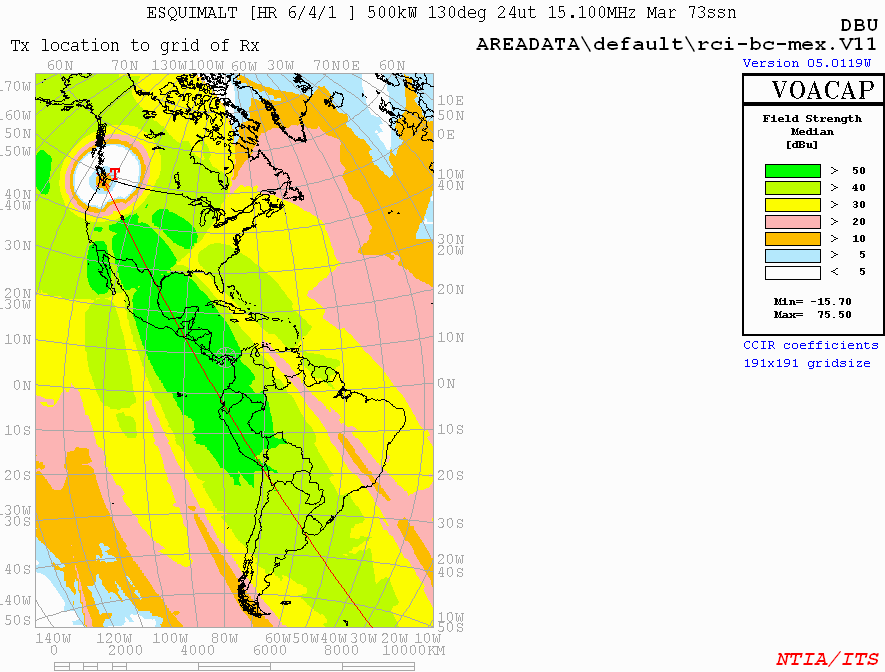
Targeting Latin America

== Shortwave relay stations using only HRS antennas ==
This is an incomplete list of stations using only HRS antennas, sorted by country name.

=== Active sites ===
Brazil

- Empresa Brasil de Comunicação Parque do Rodeador

Germany

- T-Systems Nauen

New Zealand

- RNZI Rangitaiki Plains

UK

- BBCWS Ascension Island
- BBCWS Rampisham
- BBCWS Skelton
- BBCWS Woofferton

=== Decommissioned sites ===
Australia

- CVC International, Darwin, NT at Cox Peninsula. It was formerly a Radio Australia relay station. As the land has been turned over to aboriginal land owners in 2008 by a court decision, the site was dismantled in 2009. It is not currently known if there are any remaining HRS antenna towers.

Germany

- T-Systems Wertachtal site, which is dismantled in 2014.

Canada

- Radio Canada International Sackville, NB. Radio Canada International's shortwave service was shut down in June 2012 due to Canadian Broadcasting Corporation budget cuts as a result of reduced federal subsidies. The HRS antenna towers were demolished in 2014.

Spain

- Playa de Pals Radio Station Museum (the HRS antenna field is now a 12-hole golf course)

USA

- VOA Delano, California Relay Station (mothball status, could be reactivated in some emergency situations)
- VOA Greenville-A Relay Station (Site was sold to Beaufort County, North Carolina in 2006, antennas were demolished in 2016.)

=== RADAR Systems using HR Type Antennas ===
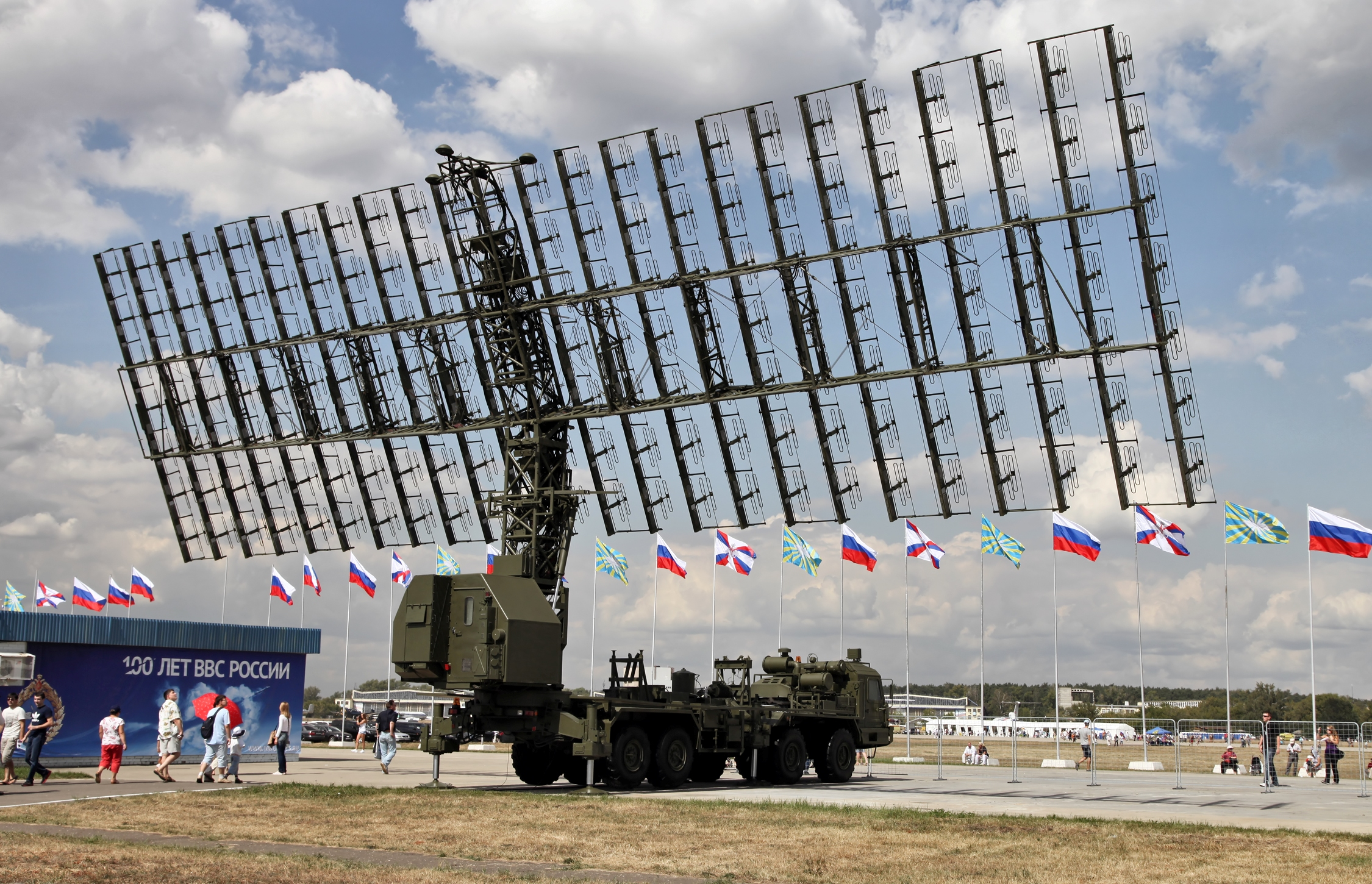
55Zh6M Nebo-M mobile multiband radar system, developed by NNIIRT

Some portable tactical antenna systems still use HR type antennas, mostly not HRS as the antennas are rotatable.
