= Mechanical Workshops Wilhelm Albrecht =

The Mechanical Workshops Wilhelm Albrecht (MWA) (German: Mechanische Werkstätten Wilhelm Albrecht) were founded in 1926 by the innovator, engineer, and entrepreneur, Wilhelm Albrecht in Berlin-Tempelhof. The logo he designed became an internationally known trademark for complete device systems for image-synchronous sound recording and processing in film and television studios since the 1950s.

== History of MWA ==
=== Early years ===
Initially, the company developed and produced kits for radio receivers and supplied them to end users, subsequently – in advanced versions - to industrial radio manufacturers such as Blaupunkt.

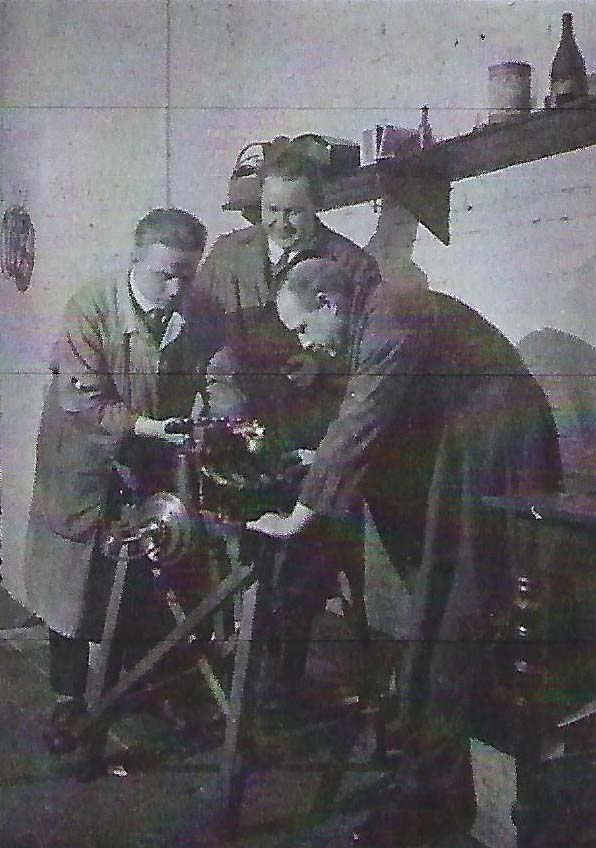
Workshop in Berlin-Tempelhof

In 1936, the company moved to larger premises at Juliusstrasse in Berlin's Neukölln district. In the following years, development and manufacturing concentrated on equipment for communication technology. In 1944, the factory was partially damaged by a bomb attack.

=== The first post-war years ===
In the remaining workshops and with the inventory of materials and machinery saved after the end of the war, items for everyday’s use at that time were manufactured (e. g. tobacco cutting machines). In addition, repairs of damaged industrial equipment were carried out.

=== Entry into film sound engineering ===
In this context, Albrecht came into contact with remaining companies of the Berlin film industry. As early as 1946, MWA received an order from Berlin-based Kaudel-Film to design and manufacture an optical sound camera (LTK 1) and other devices for sound recording and processing of feature films in sync with the picture. In addition, the company developed and manufactured stationary and portable sound mixing consoles for film studios.

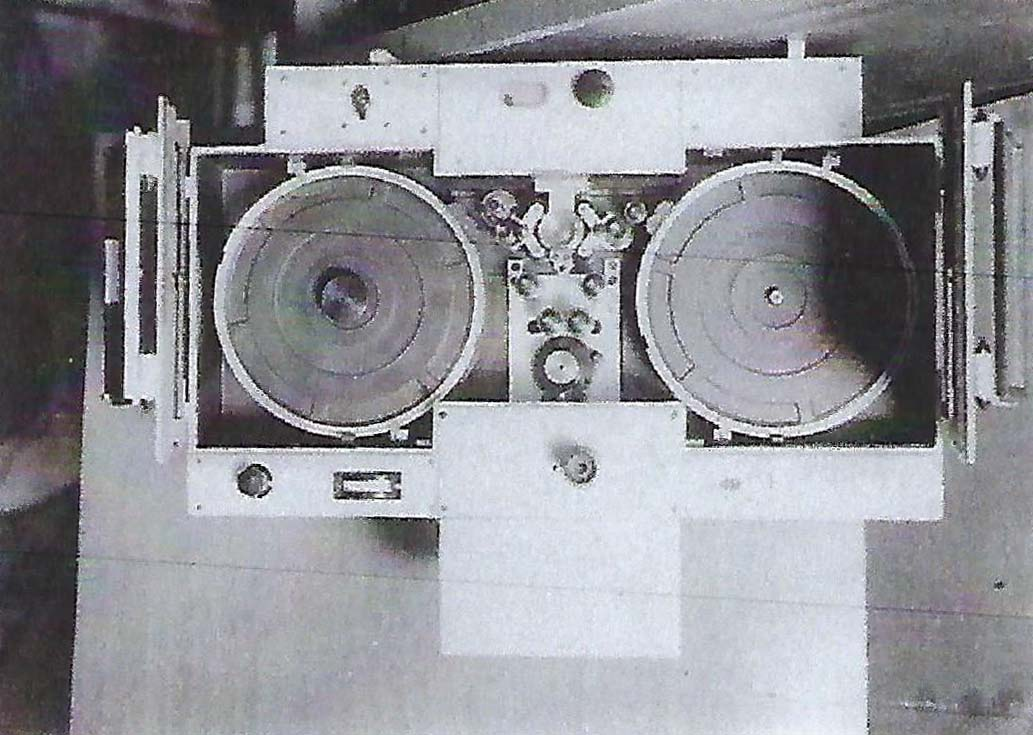
LTK 1 (1946) - optical sound camera with closed film reels

However, Albrecht soon realized that the future of film sound recording and processing would not be the optical sound technology that had been used until then, but the magnetic sound process, which had already been experimented with in the USA. He developed the first magnetic film sound device in Europe, the so-called magnetic sound camera (MTK 1).

=== Development from 1950 ===
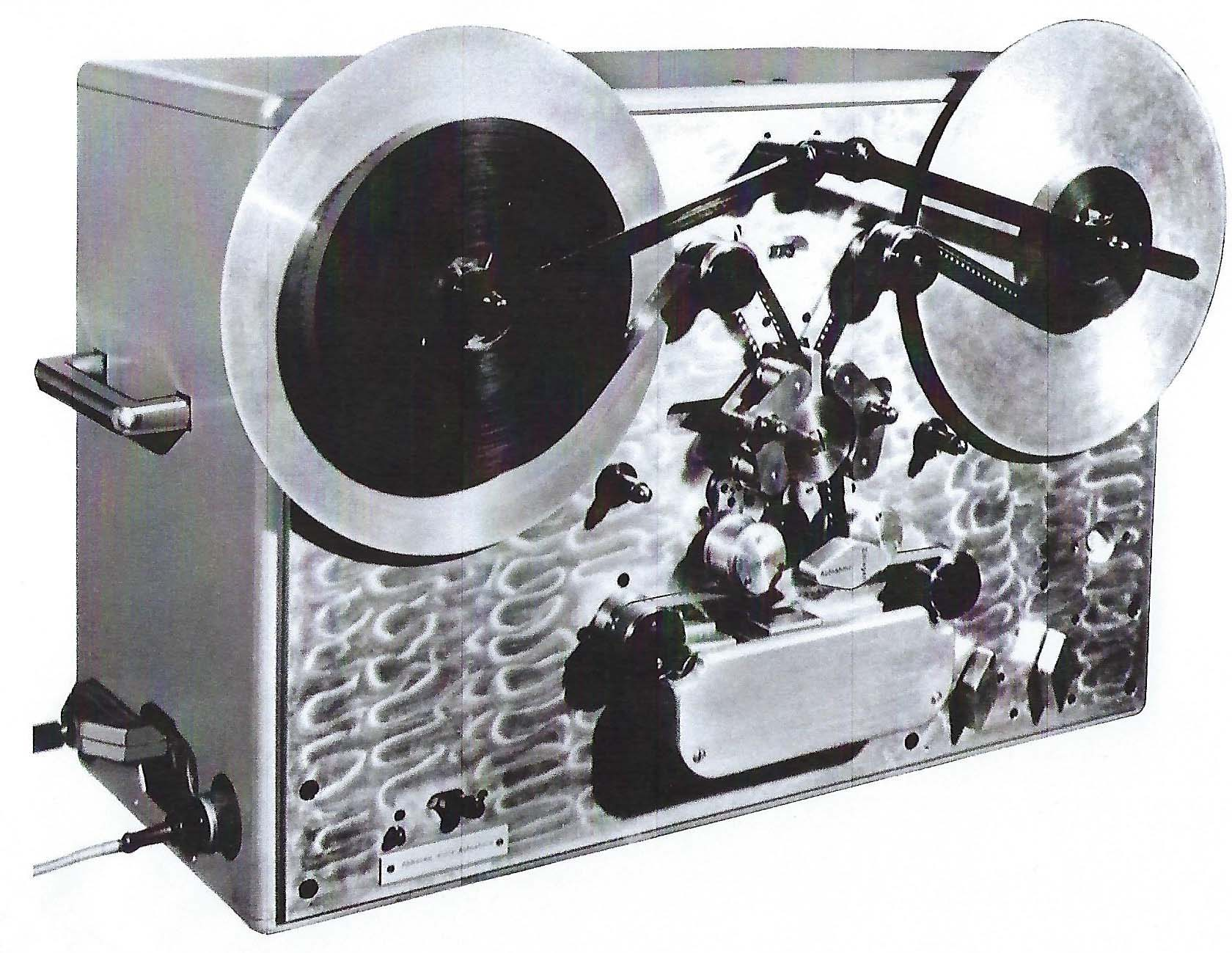
MTK 1 (1950) - magnetic sound camera

At the beginning of 1950, MWA delivered the MTK 1 to the UFA studios in Berlin-Tempelhof where it was used for dubbing feature films and for sound recording of new productions until 1970. After a public presentation of the MTK 1, the UFA praised it as a “masterpiece of modern film equipment construction, and also in a new area of sound film technology” (see letter from the UfA dated April 4, 1950). In terms of technology, this was already the breakthrough, but an unrestricted delivery to film studios all over the world could only take place after a protracted patent dispute had ended. Numerous further developments followed, from the MTK 1 to the MR 10 travel model, also supplemented by the KT 2 camera table as well as e. g. amplifiers and sound deleting devices (de-magnetizers). The column-shaped magnetic film recorders/reproducers were a major adaptation to the needs in studios - starting in 1950 with the MB 1, followed by numerous successor models up to the MB 51, which were used in film and television studios worldwide for decades.

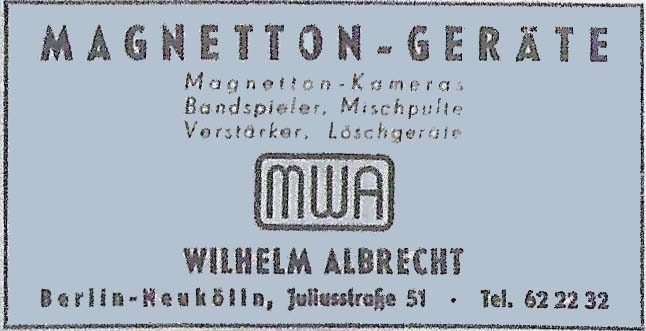
MWA advertisement

In parallel to the constant further development of devices using magnetic sound technology - later also for the new medium of television - Albrecht even participated in significant constructions for phonograph technology .

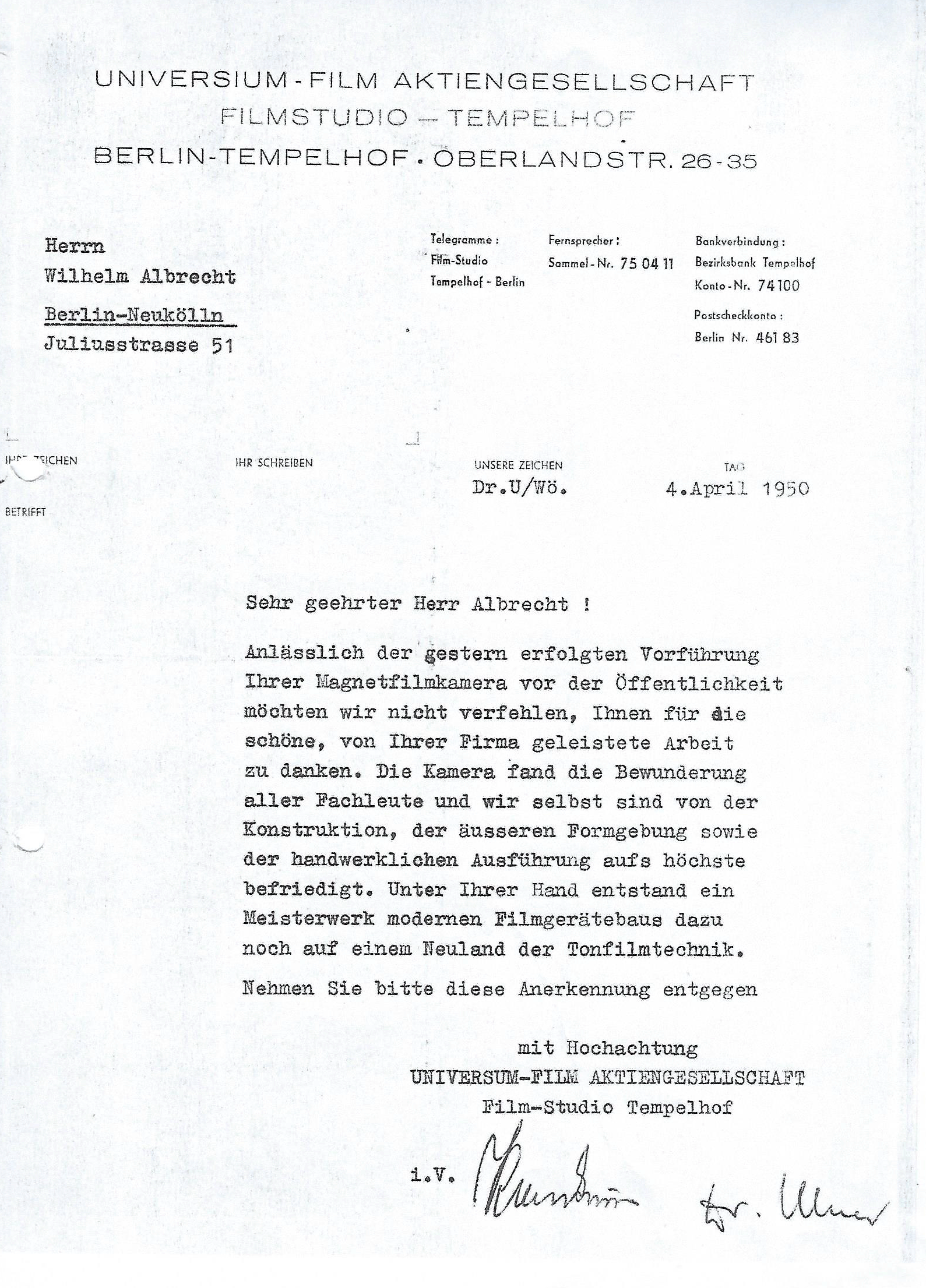
Thank-you letter from UfA 1950

In 1956, the company was transformed into a GmbH (in English: Ltd.). Wilhelm Albrecht and his wife Helene, who had headed the commercial division since 1945, were appointed managing directors with sole authorization, engineer Günter Kieß was appointed Technical Manager. The latter held this position until 1991. He extensively documented MWA equipment and systems.

In 1961, the company moved to larger premises on Maybachufer in Berlin-Neukölln. After the death of the company’s founder in 1962, his widow Helene Albrecht became general manager, a position which she held until 1974.

The continuous and innovative further development of the sound devices, which were soon supplemented by picture film transports and film scanners as well as complementary control systems was groundbreaking for the changing sophisticated production processes in film and television studios and consolidated the company's position on the international market.

In 1974, Margret Albrecht, daughter of Wilhelm and Helene Albrecht, took over the general management of the company.

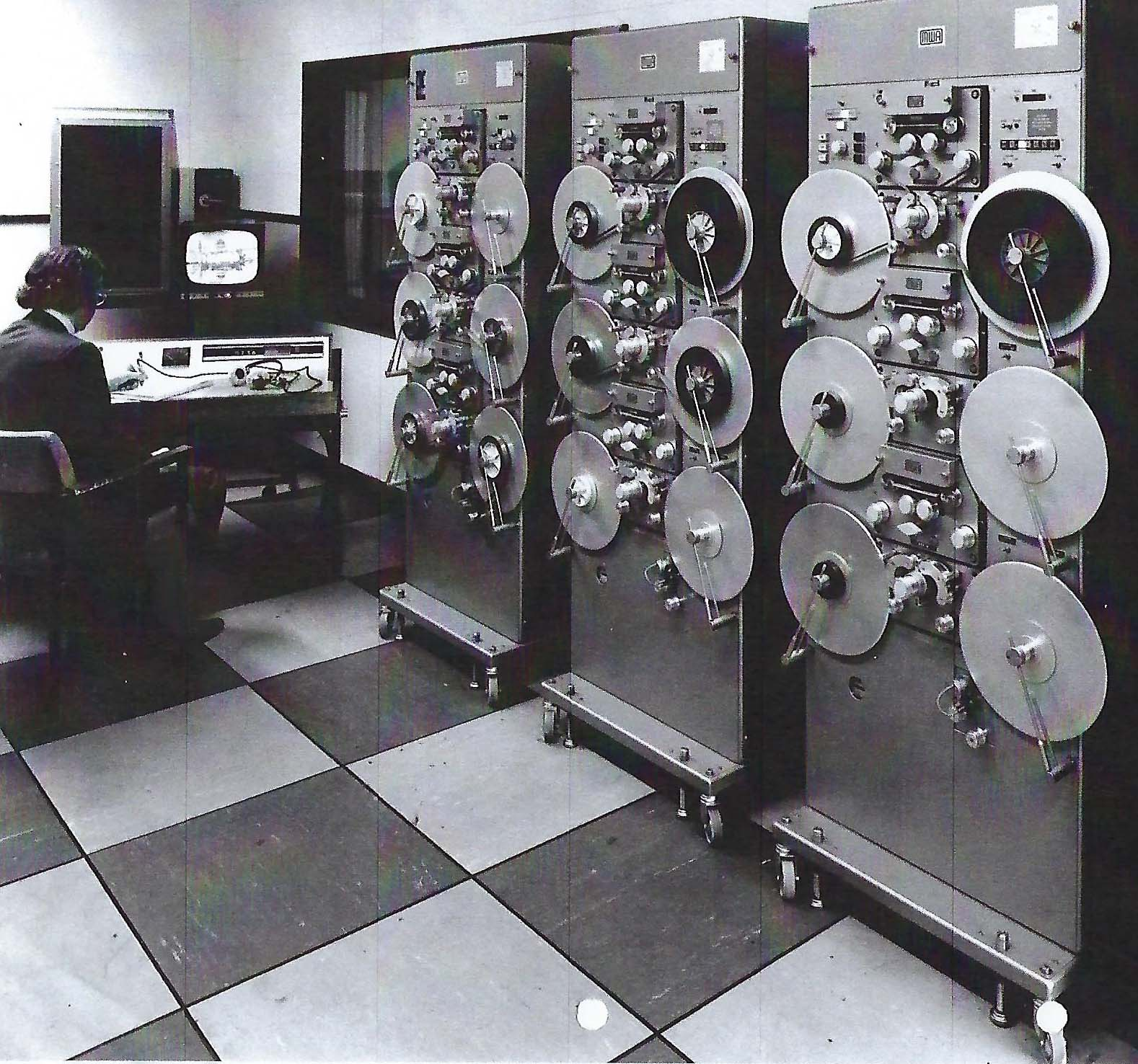
MB 43, 1978, DB Studio, England

After expanding the development capacities – due to its significance supported by state funding for research and development - and enlarging the production premises, as well as optimizing the operational procedures and creating additional sales channels, the production and delivery capacities were doubled within six years. In 1980, Wilhelm Albrecht GmbH was included in the ADAC travel guide listing technical places of interest in Germany.

=== History from the 80s ===
In 1984, Helene Kunow-Albrecht and Margret Nilsson-Albrecht sold their shares to Berliner Elektro Beteiligungen, which enabled the successful flotation as Berliner Elektro Holding AG (stock company).

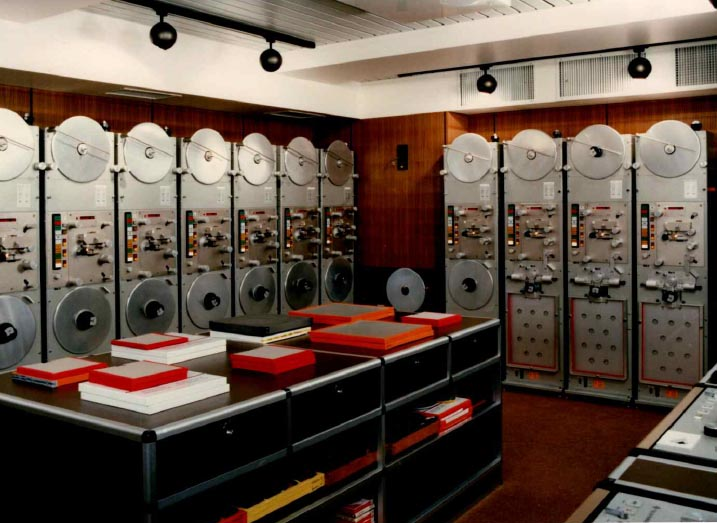
Studio Hamburg, 1986

Soon it became evident that digital technology would also largely replace the conventional analogue magnetic sound process. As a result, under the control of engineer Peter Stroetzel (general manager since 1990), the laser optical sound camera (LLK 3) for the production of optical sound negatives was developed, manufactured and, from 1996, sold to film studios and film laboratories all around the world. However, after the traditional medium film with added optical sound track was replaced by digital video technology, this market soon became saturated.

In 2002, Stroetzel, who had taken over the company shares from Berliner Elektro Holding AG in 1997, applied for insolvency, the business was finally taken over by the MWA Nova GmbH. The logo, then over 75 years old, has been preserved.

== Literature ==
- 1979: Hans Borgelt: Filmstadt Berlin, Nicolaische Verlagsbuchhandlung Berlin, ISBN 978-3-87584-070-4, pp. 58–59 and 60, see: http://d-nb.info/790229765
- 1980: Willi Paul: Technical Places of Interest in Germany, Volume V, Berlin, ADAC Verlag GmbH, ISBN 978-3-87003-163-3
