= ALLISS =

Radio antenna system

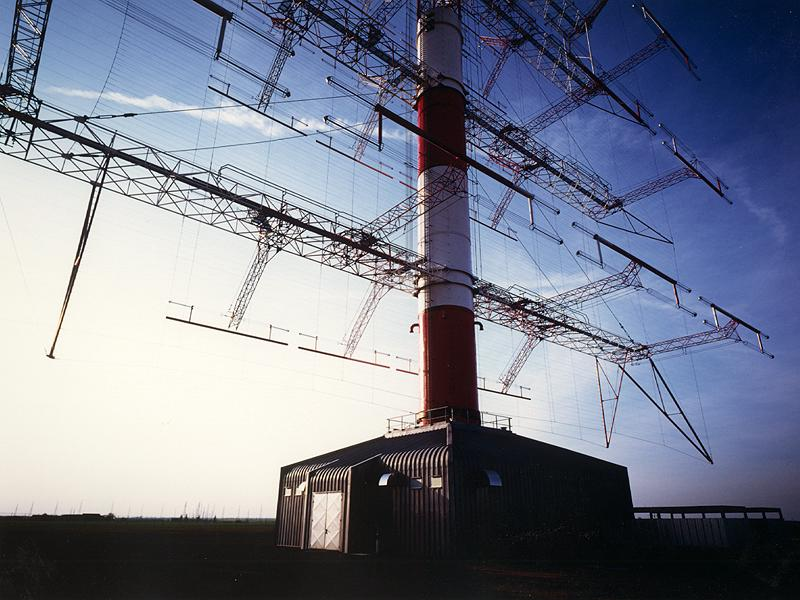
ALLISS antenna as viewed underneath

ALLISS is a somewhat rotatable antenna system for high power shortwave radio broadcasting in the 6 MHz to 26 MHz range. An ALLISS module is a self-contained shortwave relay station that is used for international broadcasting.

== Background ==
ALLISS is a special design case of HRS type antennas. True ALLISS systems have solid radiators (horizontal radiating elements) versus tensioned flexible (open) radiators found with all other variations of ITU HRS type antennas systems. The name is based on a concatenation of two French towns ALLouis and ISSoudun.

== Technological ambiguities ==
There are some factors that separate true ALLISS technology from 'run-of-the-mill' rotatable HRS Type antennas. Thales pseudo-ALLISS rotatable antenna designs were procured from other antenna manufacturers that Thales acquired by corporate transactions. Technically only solid radiators distinguish true ALLISS systems from all other rotatable HRS type antennas.

Only about 12% (estimate) of all HRS antennas in use globally are rotatable, and of these only 28 of the ALLISS systems have solid radiators. One must assume that only about 10% of HRS type antennas are rotatable, but compiled statistics are fragmentary. Only about 20% of rotatable HRS antennas are ALLISS, but this may be a slight overestimate.

The Transmitter Documentation Project has most but not all stats on shortwave relay station antennas in use or historical. The Chinese SARFT is said to contain replicated ALLISS module technology, so to consider ALLISS technology as being exclusively in the domain of Thales is no longer true.

=== Corporate name changes ===
Information about ALLISS can also be found associated with Ampegon, Thales Group, Thomson-CSF.

== Technology overview ==
=== Expense ===
ALLISS technology, due to its cost and complexity—is out of reach to most consumers as a consumer product. Cheaper solutions to ALLISS exist in the shortwave broadcasting technology area. As a rule of thumb ALLISS systems should only be purchased if 360 degrees of coverage is necessary. ALLISS is only used by well funded broadcasting and telecommunications operations that intend to use the modules over their design lifespan of 50–60 years.

=== Technology operation ===
ALLISS allows a broadcaster to change the following shortwave transmission parameters at any time: direction (azimuths from 0 to 360 degrees, rate: ~1 deg / 6 sec), broadcast frequency, and antenna configuration (i.e.: HR 4/4/1 -> HR 6/4/1). All of these transmission mode changes can take effect in as little as 5 minutes. This flexibility can allow a broadcaster to redirect the entire shortwave transmission network to a strategically important target area in as little as 15 minutes.

=== ALLISS advantages vs traditional shortwave relay stations ===
Modular construction: ALLISS relay stations can be built on a module by module basis. An ALLISS module can start broadcasting as soon as construction is completed.

Higher RFI & EMF (electromagnetic) compatibility vs traditional relay stations

- ALLISS modules should be geographically scattered for security and RFI exposure reasons. However, few broadcasters have chosen this option mainly due to poor understanding of the technology.
- Ironically, TDF did not pursue this option at Allouis or Issoudun — a technological blow to French security.

Each ALLISS module is fully automated, so there is no need for technical staff. When there are 2-5 ALLISS modules scattered over several hundred square kilometers, a three-person support staff is enough to keep the modules in operation year round (provided these modules are visited monthly for repair and maintenance).

With conventionally designed HRS type antennas shortwave relay stations and their obligatory transmitter hall, switch matrix, coaxial or open feeder line systems and multiple antennas (~90% of shortwave relay stations are built this way) much larger staffs are required.

=== Cost per module ===
Around US$10 million.

- Some modules have been rumored to cost as much as US$15 million.
- With 4 different module versions cost per module can vary by as much as US$5 million.
- At least 30% of the cost of each module is related to the still exotic metallurgy and metalworking requirements needed to construct each module.
- Because of the costly and complex metallurgy construction requirements, ALLISS technology is 'off limits' to many developing nations including even a few advanced nations in the developed world.

=== Versions of ALLISS modules ===
According to the 2005 Thales brochure on ALLISS there are 6 different versions of the ALLISS system. These versions are sorted by date of initial installation.

- 1995: France at Issoudun 46.9448°N 1.9092°E and Allouis
  - Low Band Modes (HR) : 4/4, 4/3, 4/2, 2/4, 2/3, 2/2
  - High Band Modes (HR) : 4/6, 4/4, 4/2, 2/6, 2/4
  - Band coverage: 5.9 MHz to 26.1 MHz (10 modules)
  - Band coverage: 5.9 MHz to 17.9 MHz (2 modules)
- 1997: Germany at Nauen Transmitter Station-A 52.6479°N 12.9085°E
  - Low Band Modes (HR) : 4/4, 2/2
  - High Band Modes (HR) : 4/4
  - 2 systems installed
- 1997: Germany at Nauen Transmitter Station-B 52.6493°N 12.8783°E
  - Low Band Modes (HR) : 4/4
  - High Band Modes (HR) : 4/4
  - 2 systems installed
- 2002: Oman at A'Seela (Al Ashkharah) 21.9183°N 59.617°E
  - Low Band Modes (HR) : 4/4, 2/4, 4/2, 2/2
  - High Band Modes (HR) : 4/4, 2/4, 4/2, 2/2
  - 2 systems installed
  - Band coverage: 5.9 MHz to 17.9 MHz
- 2003: China at Qiqihar (47.3283°N 124.0566°E - dismantled?)
  - Low Band Modes (HR) : 4/4, 2/4, 4/2, 2/2
  - High Band Modes (HR) : 4/4, 2/4, 4/2, 2/2
  - Band coverage: 5.9 MHz to 26.1 MHz
- Before 2006: Turkey at Emirler, Voice of Turkey 39.404802°N 32.84415°E
- 2009 : Kuwait at Sulaibiya 29.1441°N 47.7642°E
  - Three HR 2/2 antennas similar to Thales model HP-RCA 2/2 and a full ALLISS system. In operation since the first Gulf War.
  - This model appears to be similar to those sold to China. There may be some export requirements that may keep HR 6/4/x models from being exported to politically sensitive regions.
- 2009: Cuba— According to Glen Hauser's World of Radio transmission of 25 June 2009, the SARFT is said to have received a contract via the Chinese Foreign Affairs Department to replicate ALLISS modules in Cuba at an undisclosed or undetermined location. There is no mapping evidence to indicate that construction has begun.
- 2009: Nigeria — Abuja-Lugbe transmitter (8.968°N 7.36531°E)

=== Transmitter ===
Typically ALLISS modules possess a 500 kW polyphase shortwave transmitter.

- Digital 'AM' type transmitters are preferred for their compactness.
- Many 'Push-pull' (Class-B) transmitters may be too large for some ALLISS installations.
- Essentially all 300 kW and 500 kW PDM, PSM, polyphase (4 x PDM) transmitters are preferred for structural reasons.
- It is not customary to install a 300 kW transmitter in an ALLISS module, but such installations are possible.
- TDF's Montsinnery Relay Station has 2 ALLISS modules installed, but without an installed shortwave transmitter. This same design arrangement is used by the BBC World Service Oman Relay Station A'Seela.

=== Antennas (high band) ===
Three HRS array antennas types are available for broadcasting in the traditional shortwave broadcasting bands.

For tropical and lower frequency shortwave broadcasting

- HR 4/2/1 (using low band antenna)
- HR 2/4/1 (using low band antenna)
- HR 2/2/1

For traditional shortwave broadcasting

- HR 4/2/1
- HR 4/4/1

For highly directional shortwave broadcasting

- HR 6/4/1
- HR 6/2/1

The HRS 6/4/1 is not available for use in the 26 MHz band.

=== Antennas (low band) ===
One Low Band antenna exists for Tropical Band broadcasting. It takes up the entire back side of the ALLISS module. This Low Band antenna counterbalances the primary transmission antennas used in traditional shortwave broadcasting.

=== Relay stations with ALLISS modules ===
Documentation format — Nation : Broadcaster : City (Modules, Date Sold)

- France : TDF : Issoudun (12 modules, 1993 and 1997)
- Germany : DW : Nauen (4 modules, 1997)
- French Guiana : TDF : Montsinery (2 modules, 1997)
- Oman : BBCWS & VT Merlin : (2 modules, 2002)
- China : SARFT : Qiqihari : (12 modules, 2005)

Total number of modules sold since 1989: 32

== Notable sites ==
RFI at Issoudun

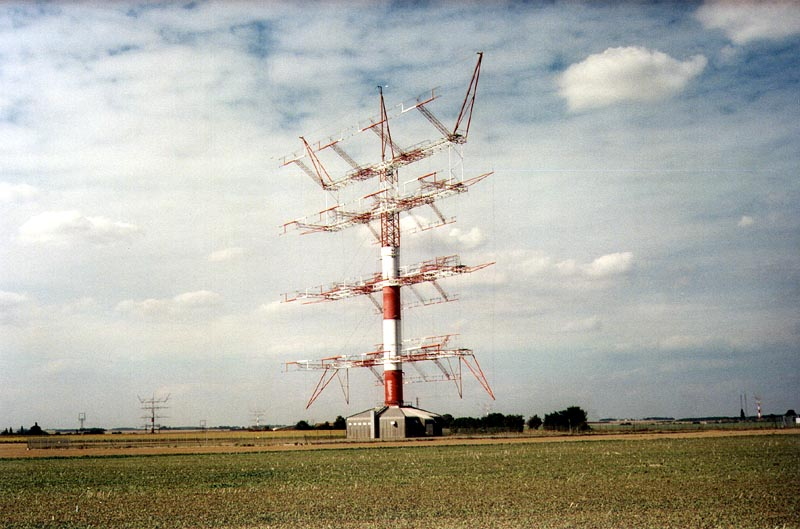
Volga ALLISS Module

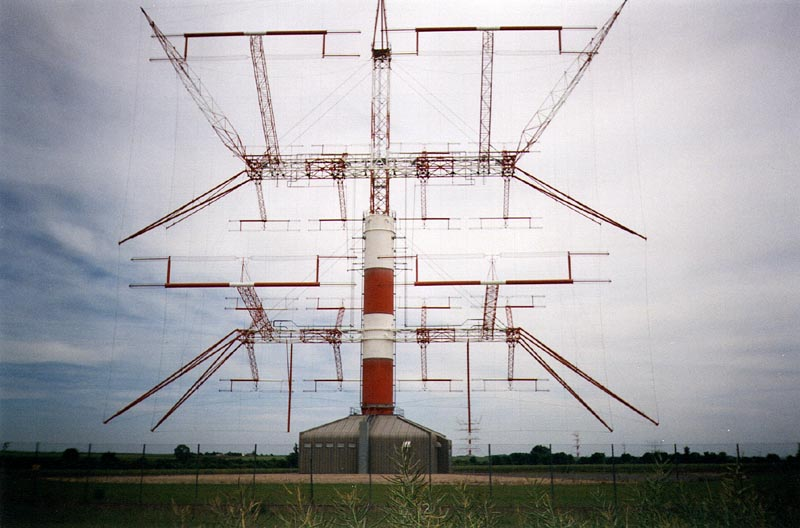
Ganges ALLISS Module

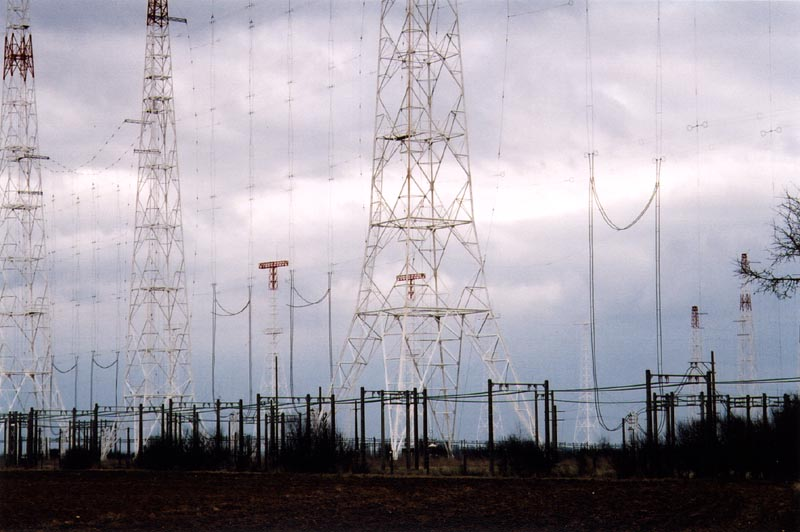
Former RFI Issoudun Relay station feeders and curtain arrays

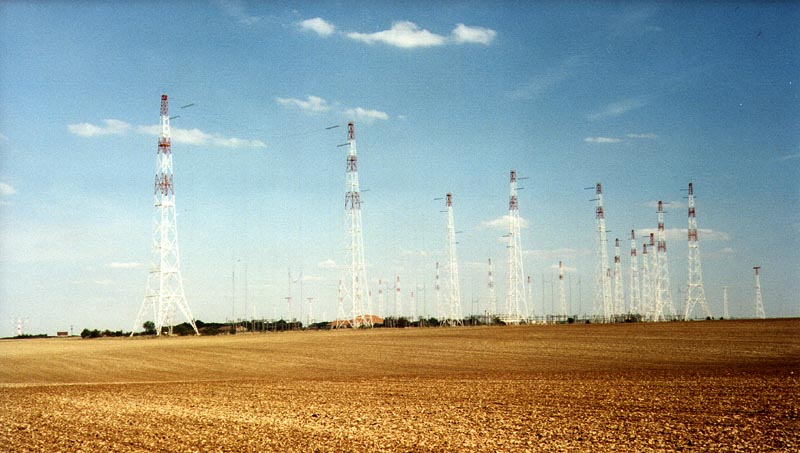
Former RFI Issoudun Relay curtain arrays
RFI at Montsinéry-Tonnegrande (French Guyana)

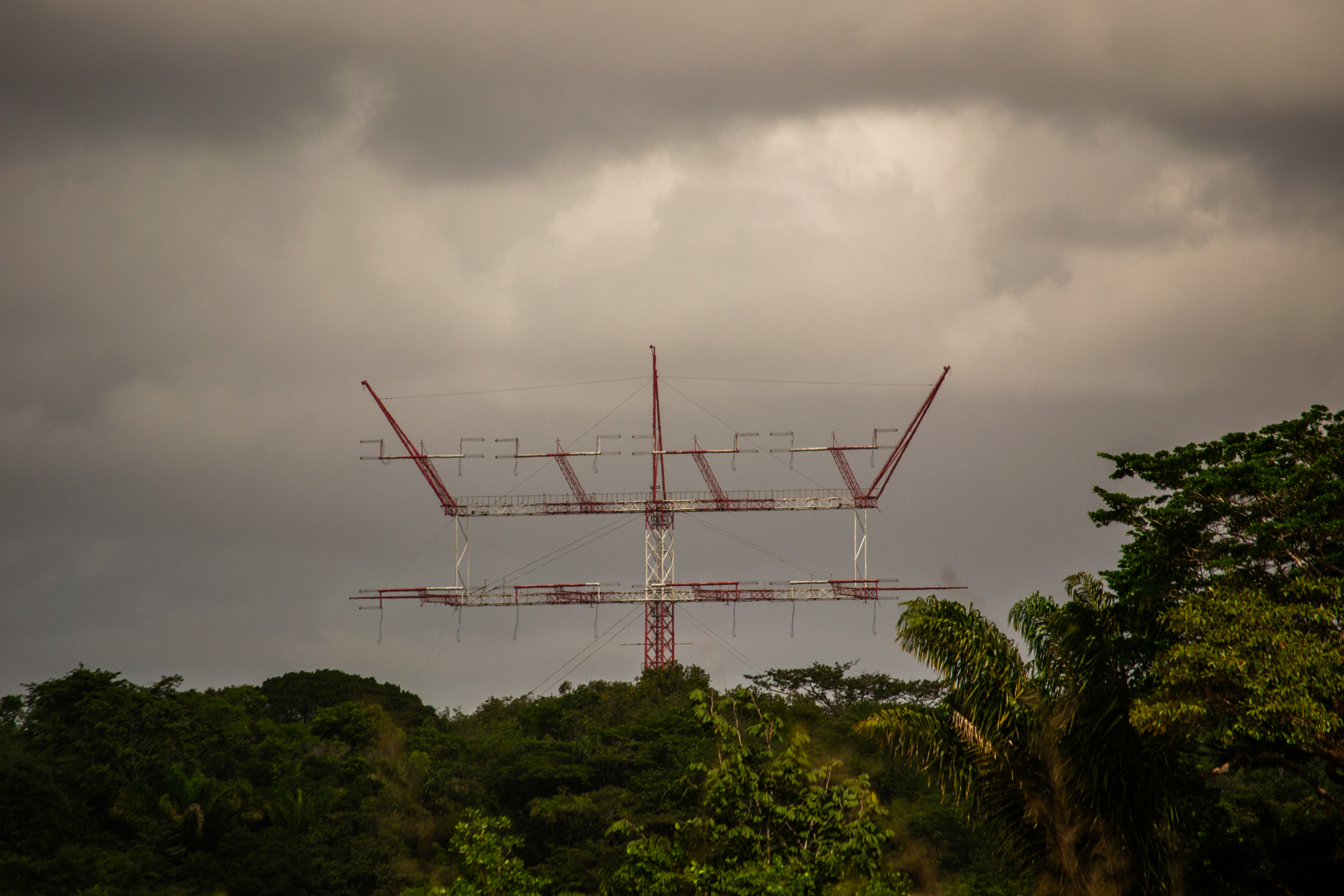
Toucan1 (ALLISS) module at Montsinery-Tonnegrande (French Guiana)

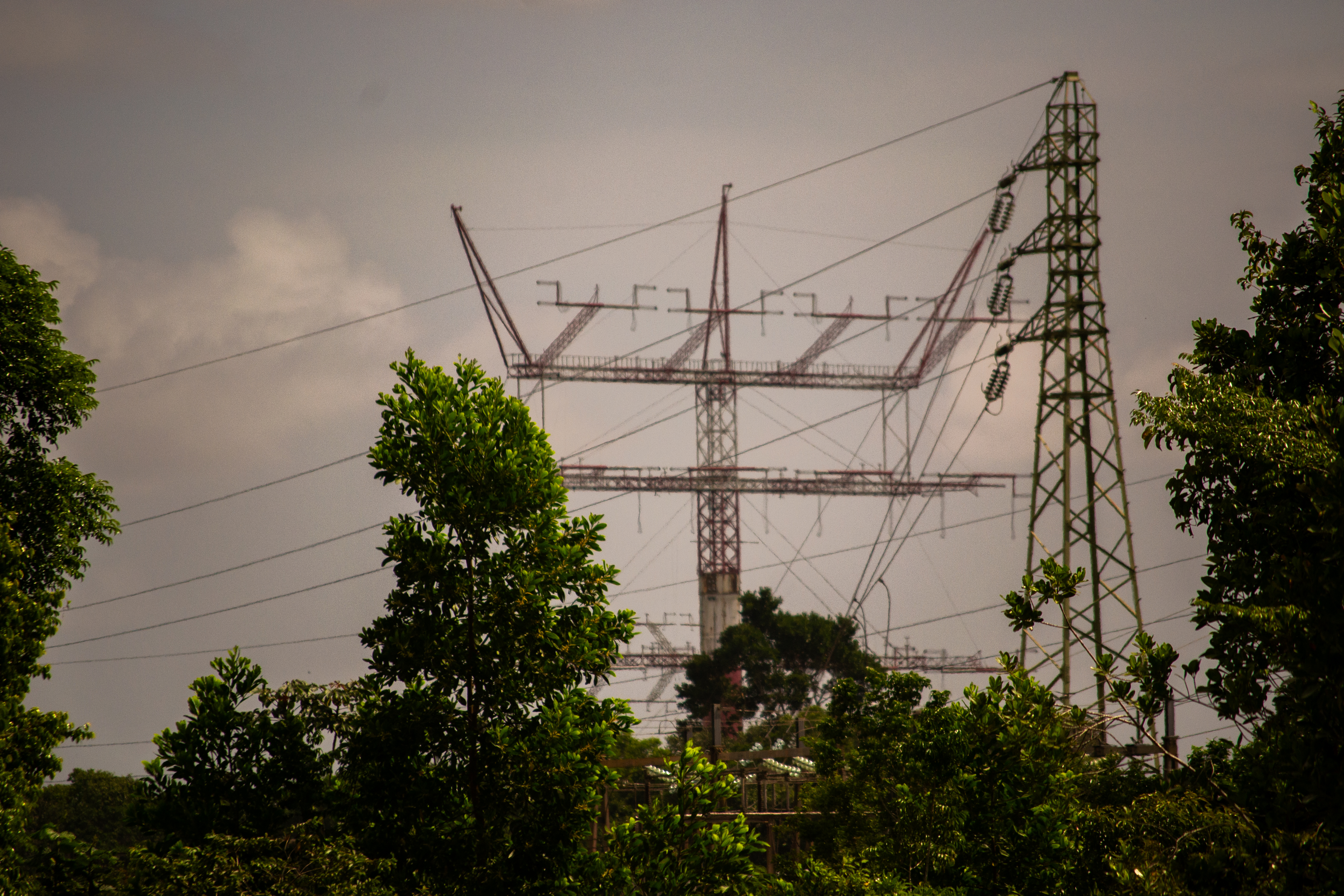
Toucan1 (ALLISS) module at Montsinery-Tonnegrande (French Guiana)

The International broadcasting center of TDF (Télédiffusion de France) is at Issoudun/Ste Aoustrille. Issoudun is currently utilized by TDF for shortwave transmissions. The site uses 12 rotary ALLISS antennas fed by 12 transmitters of 500 kW each to transmit shortwave broadcasts by Radio France International (RFI), along with other broadcast services.

== See also ==
Applicable related technologies

- VOACAP can simulate all ITU HRS antenna types
- HRS type antennas

Broadcasters using ALLISS modules

- BBC World Service
- Deutsche Welle
- China Radio International
- Radio France International
