= EMF =

EMF may refer to:

== Computing ==
- Eclipse Modeling Framework, based on Eclipse software
- Enhanced Metafile, a Microsoft Windows image file format

== Music ==
- EMF (band), a British band
  - "EMF", a bonus track on the EMF album Schubert Dip
- E.M.F. (album), a 1983 album by GG Allin

=== Festivals ===
- Electrobeach Music Festival, in Port-Barcarès, France
- Essence Music Festival, in New Orleans, Louisiana, United States

== Science and medicine ==
- Electromagnetic field
- Electromotive force
- Endomyocardial fibrosis

== Other uses ==
- E-M-F Company, an early American automobile manufacturer
- Edinburgh Marathon Festival, in Scotland
- Educational Media Foundation, an American radio network
- El Monte Flores, an Hispanic gang located in El Monte, California
- Electromagnetic Field (festival), a British hacker convention
- Electronic Music Foundation, an American music organization
- Emerging Markets Forum, an American economic organization
- Energy Modeling Forum, an American group of energy modelers
- Engineers Mobility Forum, see Regulation and licensure in engineering
- European Maritime Force
- European Metalworkers' Federation, a trade union federation
- European Minifootball Federation
- European Mortgage Federation, an industry organization
- European Museum Forum
- Experimental Mechanized Force of the British Army
