= Shortwave relay station =

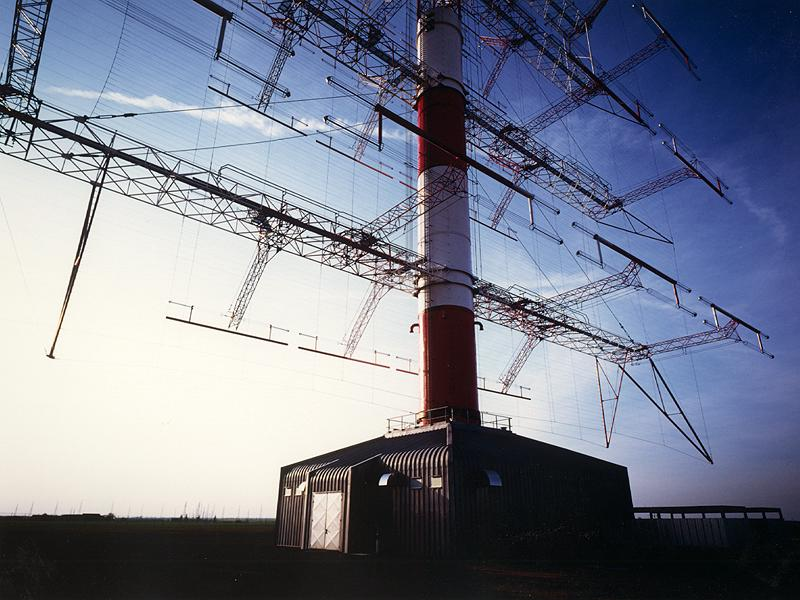
ALLISS antenna as viewed underneath

Shortwave relay stations are transmitter sites used by international broadcasters to extend their coverage to areas that cannot be reached easily from their home state. For example, the BBC operates an extensive net of relay stations.

These days the programs are fed to the relay sites by satellite, cable/optical fiber or the Internet. Frequencies, transmitter power and antennas depend on the desired coverage. Some regional relays even operate in the medium wave or FM bands.

Relay stations are also important to reach listeners in countries that practice radio jamming. Depending on the effect of the shortwave dead zone the target countries can jam the programs only locally, e.g. for bigger cities. For this purpose Radio Free Europe/Radio Liberty with studios in Munich, Germany operated a relay station in Portugal, in the extreme west of Europe, to reach then-communist Eastern Europe.

== Variations in design ==
One and only one broadcasting technology couples all of the components of a traditional shortwave relay station into one unit: the ALLISS module. For persons totally unfamiliar with the concepts of how shortwave relay stations operate this design may be the most understandable.

The ALLISS module is a fully rotatable antenna system for high power (typically 500 kW only) shortwave radio broadcasting—it essentially is a self contained shortwave relay station.

Most of the world's shortwave relay stations do not use this technology, due to its cost (15m EUR per ALLISS module: Transmitter + Antenna + Automation equipment).

== Planning and design ==
A traditional shortwave relay station—depending on how many transmitters and antennas that it will have—may take up to two years to plan. After planning is completed, it may take up to five years to construct the relay station.

The historically long design and planning cycle for shortwave relay stations ended in the 1990s. Many advanced software planning tools (not related to the relay station design proper) became available. Choosing a series of possible sites for a relay station is about 100 times faster using Google Earth, for example. With the modern graphical version of Ioncap, simplified propagation studies can completed in less than a week for any chosen site.

In some cases, existing relay stations can have their designs more or less duplicated, thus speeding up development time. However, there is one general exception to this: the ALLISS Module. From initial planning to deployment of ALLISS Modules may take a mere 1.5 years to 9 months depending on the number of modules deployed at one time in a particular sector of a country.

=== Operation ===
These are considered general operating parameters:

- 20 hours per day, but geopolitical reasons may dictate some stations run 24 hours per day (a 168-hour week)
- Generally 360 days per year, depending on the number of redundant transmitters and antennas
- Relay Stations generally consume from 250 kilowatts (kW) to 10 megawatts (MW)
- A single 100 kW SW transmitter consumes 225 kW RMS as a general rule
- A single 300 kW SW transmitter consumes 625 kW RMS as a general rule
- Modulator efficiency: Class-B modulators have about a 65% efficiency level, but digital (PDM or PSM or hybrid variants) modulators have about an 85% efficiency level as a general rule (for Amplitude Modulation)
- Broadcast times and frequencies are under ITU regulation

=== Design ===
General requirements of shortwave relay stations:

- Road access (fairly universal)
- HVAC mains access building or transformer in the transmitter building itself
- Staff quarters (if the relay station is not fully automated)
- Incoming audio processing centre, but since the mid-1980s this has evolved into one to five rack units
- Transmitter hall (50 kW, 100 kW, 250 kW, 300 kW, 500 kW shortwave transmitter)
- Switch matrix (but these are not typically used by ALLISS modules)
- Baluns (but their use is not always required nor universal)
- antenna tuners (sometimes called ATUs or roller coasters because of their appearance)
- Feeder lines (coax cable and open feeder lines are the most common feeders in use)
- HRS-type antennas, or occasionally log-periodic (horizontal)
- In parts of the developing world log-periodic (horizontal) antennas are used to provide less directional gain to a target area.

=== Broadcast range ===
- generally to target areas that are more than 300 km from the transmitter site
- most shortwave relay station target areas are 1500 km to 3500 km from the transmitter site

=== Mobile relay stations ===
The IEEE Book series "The History of International Broadcasting" (Volume I) describes mobile shortwave relay stations used by the German propaganda ministry during WWII, to avoid them being located by radio direction finding and bombed by the Allies. They consisted of a generator truck, transmitter truck and an antenna truck, and are thought to have had a radiated power of about 50 kW. Radio Industry Zagreb (RIZ Transmitters) currently produces mobile shortwave transmitters.

== Notable sites : Issoudun ==
RFI at Issoudun

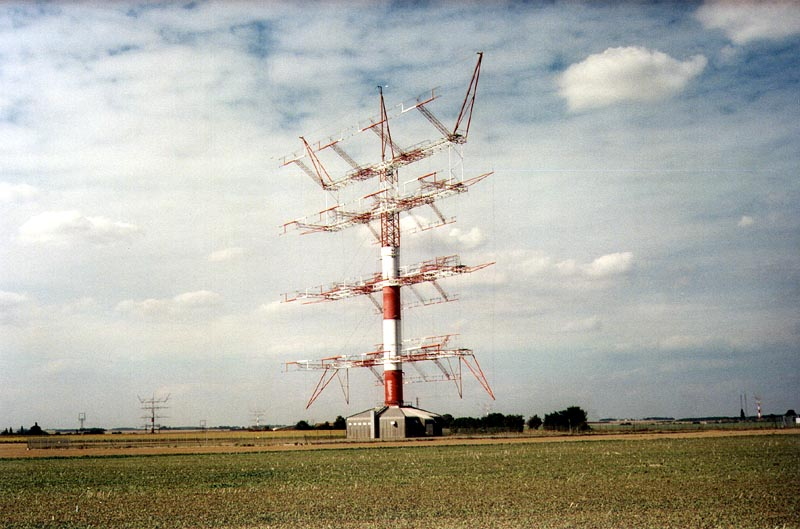
Volga ALLISS Module

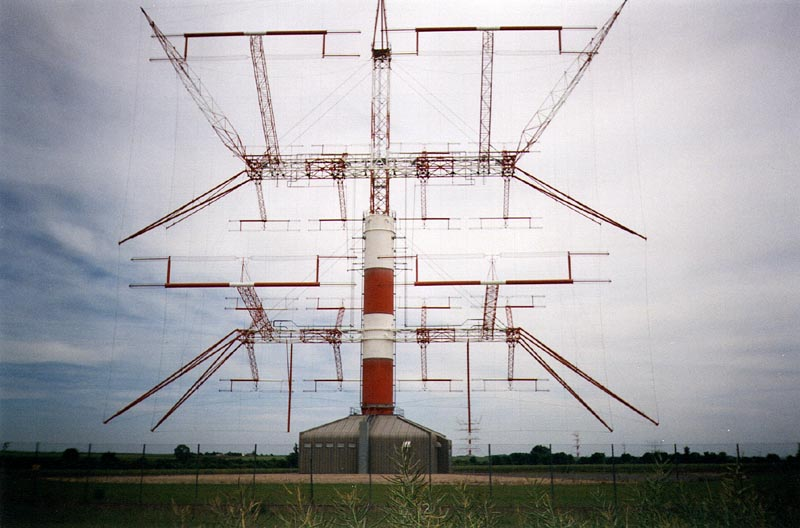
Ganges ALLISS Module

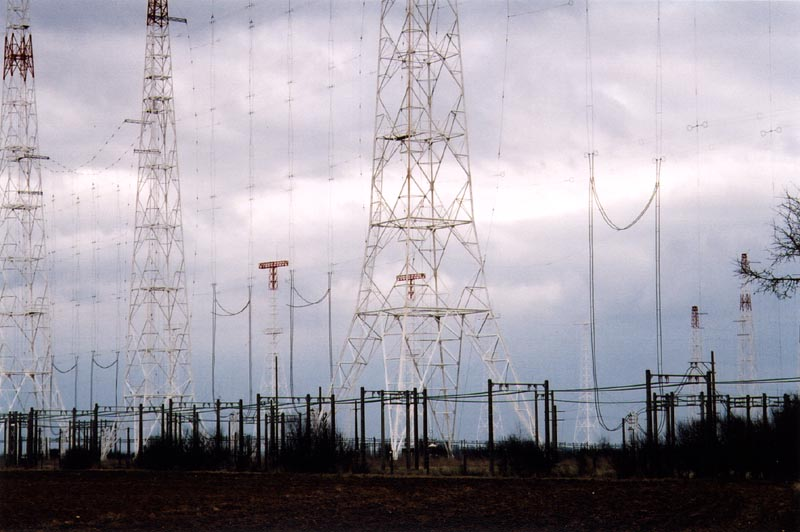
Former RFI Issoudun Relay station feeders and curtain arrays

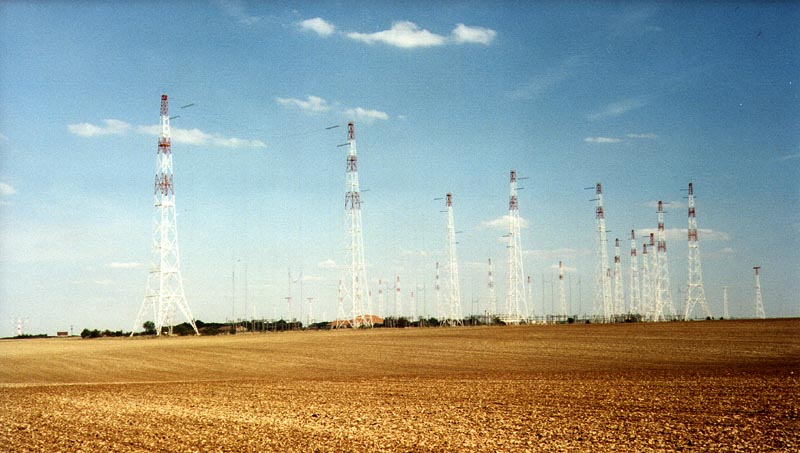
Former RFI Issoudun Relay curtain arrays

The International broadcasting center of TDF (Télédiffusion de France) is at Issoudun/Saint-Aoustrille. As of 2011, Issoudun is utilized by TDF for shortwave transmissions. The site uses 12 rotary ALLISS antennas fed by 12 transmitters of 500 kW each to transmit shortwave broadcasts by Radio France Internationale (RFI), along with other broadcast services.

== See also ==
- Broadcast relay station
- Imperial Wireless Chain
