= Insurance Europe =

- Formation: 1953
- Legal status: Non-profit company
- Purpose: European insurance and reinsurance federation
- Headquarters: Brussels, Belgium
- Region served: Europe
- Members: 37
- Official language: English
- Director General: Thea Utoft Høj Jensen
- Staff: 45
- Website: www.insuranceeurope.eu

Insurance Europe is the European insurance and reinsurance federation. Insurance Europe, which is based in Brussels, Belgium, makes a major contribution to Europe's economic growth and development. The federation is the voice of the European insurance industry at European and international levels.

== Overview ==
Through its 37 member bodies national insurance associations — the national insurance associations — it represents all types of insurance and reinsurance undertakings, e.g. pan-European companies, monoliners, mutuals and SMEs. Insurance Europe, which is based in Brussels, Belgium, represents undertakings that account for around 95% of total European premium income. Insurance makes a major contribution to Europe's economic growth and development. European insurers pay out over €1 000bn annually — or €2.8bn a day — in claims, directly employ more than 920 000 people and invest over €10.6trn in the economy. In addition, Europe Insurances allocated approximately €150bn to sustainable investments.

"Insurance Europe is considered a fair and reliable partner and a contact point for Institutions of the European Union, politicians and supervisors. The federation provides services to the European and international institutions to the benefit of its members. In the regulatory process, it represents the common interests of European insurers by developing, promoting, defending, illustrating and lobbying industry positions that are supported by technical research and expertise. Through government lobby, public affairs, industry forums and issue management, it contributes to achieve a positive political, social, business and economic environment in support of the industry".

Insurance Europe provides the infrastructure for an exchange information and experience between members. The federation also plays a supporting role in relation to its members and provides information and guidance on issues of interest to the European insurance sector.

== History ==
Insurance Europe was founded in 1953 as Comité Européen des Assurances (CEA). Insurance Europe had 18 members in 1953 and later had several dozen national member associations. Its aim was to observe the works of the OECD in Paris. Later, CEA shifted its attention and activities to the European arena, therefore adapting to the power structures resulting from the foundation of the European Community and its more recent evolution into the European Union. In March 2012, it changed its name from Comité Européen des Assurances to Insurance Europe.

== Mission statement ==
The Insurance Europe's mission is:

- To draw attention to issues of strategic interest to all European insurers and reinsurers in a sustainable manner.
- To raise awareness of insurers' and reinsurers' roles in providing insurance protection and security to the community as well as in contributing to economic growth and development.
- To promote – as the expert and representative voice of the insurance industry – a competitive and open market to the benefit of the European consumer as well as corporate clients.

== Insurance Europe in the News ==
- Insurance Europe RAB advocates for open global reinsurance marketplace - Reinsurance News -
- Insurance Europe: Statement on the EU Commission's ESG rating proposal - Institutional Money -
- "More than a third of Europeans are not saving for retirement" - La Tribune de l'Assurance -
