= European Covered Bond Council =

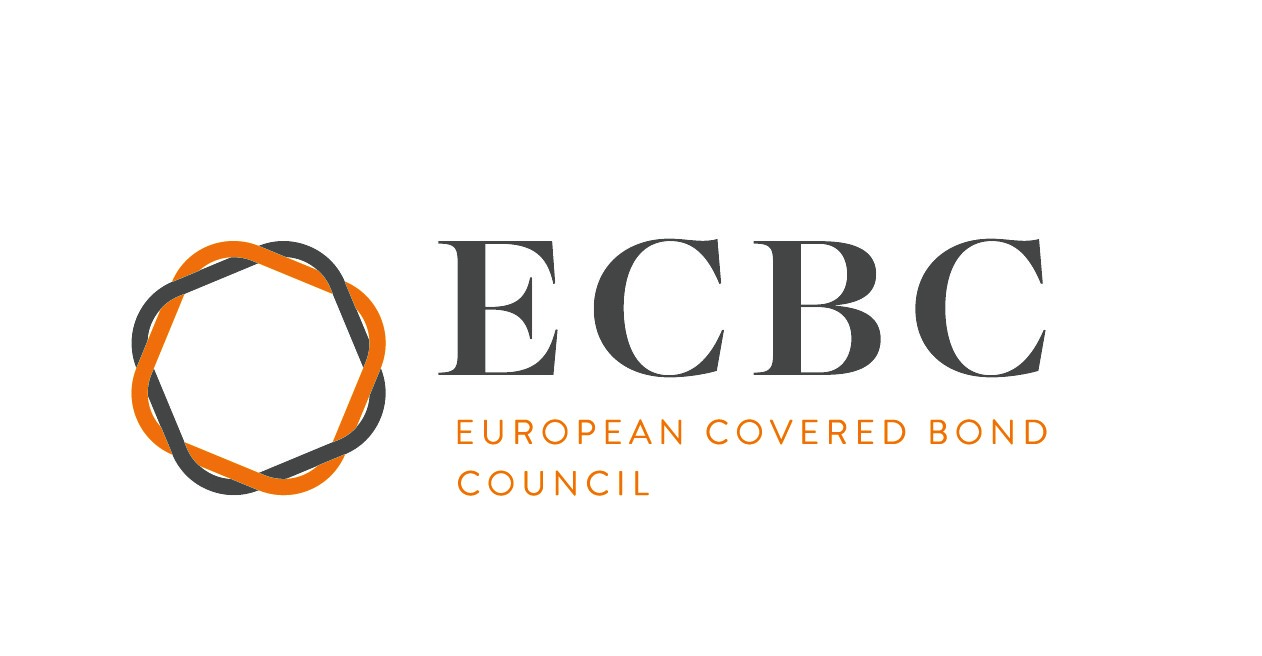
- Logo of the European Covered Bond Council
- Abbreviation: ECBC
- Established: 2004; 22 years ago
- Founder: European Mortgage Federation
- Type: Trade association
- Location: Brussels, Belgium
- Region served: Worldwide
- Official language: English
- Website: hypo.org/ecbc/

The European Covered Bond Council is trade association representing covered bond market participants including covered bond issuers, analysts, investment bankers, rating agencies and a wide range of other interested stakeholders.

== History ==
The group founded by the European Mortgage Federation in November 2004.

== Working groups ==
The European Covered Bond Council has seven technical Working Groups:

- EU Legislation Working Group
- ECBC Technical Issues Working Group
- Research and Data Working Group
- Market Related Issues Working Group'
- Covered Bond Fact Book Working Group
- Rating Agency Approaches Working Group
- Global Issues Working Group

== Publications ==
- The ECBC Covered Bond Fact Book
- ECBC concept note on third country equivalence for a global implementation of the Covered Bond Directive
