= European Mortgage Federation =

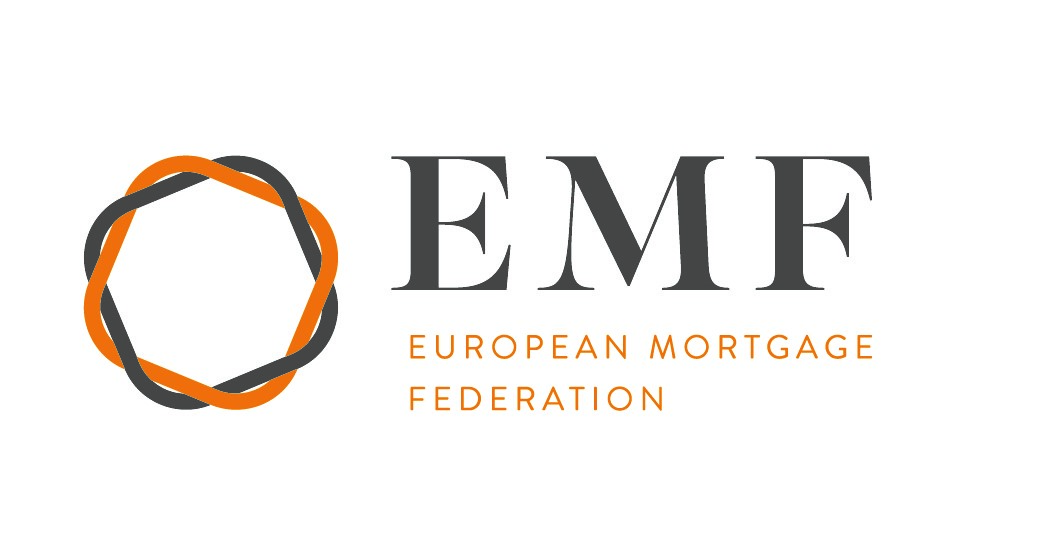
- Formation: 1967; 59 years ago
- Type: Trade association
- Legal status: Federation
- Purpose: Represent the European mortgage industry
- Location: Brussels, Belgium
- Region served: Europe
- Products: Position papers, statistics and responses to policy makers
- Members: 13 Full members and 11 observer members (2024)
- Funding: Member fees
- Website: hypo.org/emf/

The European Mortgage Federation (EMF) is a trade association representing the mortgage industry in Europe. It provides information on the industry to policy makers, does research and published position papers.

Through its work the Federation has become the key-talking partner of the European Commission, the European Parliament, the European Central Bank, the European System of Financial Supervisors and the Basel Committee on Banking Supervision on all questions relating to the European mortgage industry.

The Federation currently has 13 members across 12 Member States of the European Union as well as some observer members. The EMF secretariat is based in Brussels, Belgium.

== Committees ==
The European Mortgage Federation has four main technical committees:

- The Economic Affairs Committee (EAC)
- The Legal Affairs Committee (LAC)
- The Research & Data Committee
- The Valuation Committee (VALCOM)

== Publications ==
The EMF regularly publishes data, statistics, studies and a newsletter which provide information on developments, strategies and the latest trends related to the mortgage industry in Europe. The following are examples of some of the publications available:

=== Hypostat ===
The Federation's main source of statistical information with regards to recent developments in housing and mortgage markets in Europe. Hypostat is the result of a collaborative effort by the European Mortgage Federation's national delegations and external experts.

=== Quarterly Reviews ===
EMF's Quarterly Reviews present the latest short-term developments in mortgage and housing markets in Europe. The reviews include tables, charts and comments on the following indicators:

- Representative mortgage interest rates
- Total residential lending outstanding
- Gross and net mortgage lending
- Nominal house prices (% annual change)

=== The Latest from Brussels ===
The EMF-ECBC's Latest from Brussels is the Federation's weekly EU public affairs and policy newsletter exclusively for EMF-ECBC members. This provides the latest regulatory developments on key files with direct or indirect impact on mortgage credit and covered bond market, specifically designed for those who monitor developments at European level. It reports on progress made in the main issues currently under discussion in Brussels, Paris and Frankfurt.

== Energy Efficient Mortgages 'Ecosystem' ==
The EMF has been promoting green bonds which play an important role in financing assets needed for the low-carbon transition.

Based on consumer research, market research and value chain analysis conducted in Scotland and the Province of Trento (EEMI market demonstrators), over the course of two and a half years, the Energy Efficient Mortgages Initiative (EEMI) has boiled the findings down into core elements which are being brought together in an EEMI ‘ecosystem’, a market-led initiative spanning the whole value chain, from the origination of green mortgages to the issuance of green covered bonds.

To facilitate a more active participation by banks in the green loans market, the European Commission is advised to make available a voluntary EU definition and label for green loans based on the use of the loan proceeds.
