= Nauen Transmitter Station =

Oldest continuously operating radio transmitting installation in the world

Coordinates: 52.647721°N 12.909772°E

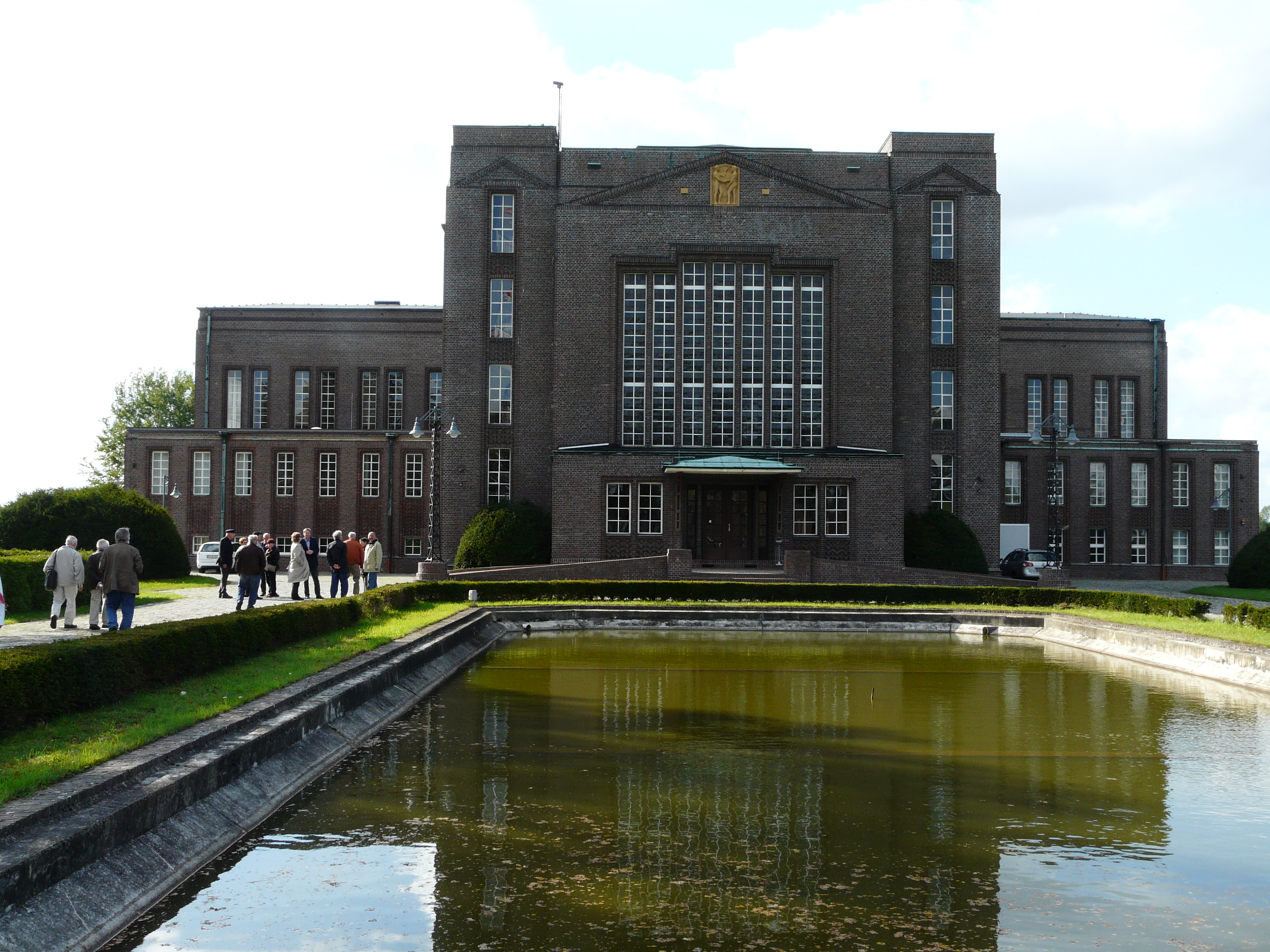
Preserved Nauen transmitter building designed by Herman Muthesius, dating from 1920

Nauen Transmitter Station (German: Grossfunkstelle Nauen or Sender Nauen) in Nauen, Havelland district, Brandenburg, Germany, is the oldest continuously operating radio transmitting installation in the world. Germany's first high power radio transmitter, it was founded on 1 April 1906 by Telefunken corporation and operated as a longwave radiotelegraphy station through World War II, and during World War I became Germany's main link with the outside world when its submarine communications cables were cut. Upgraded with shortwave transmitters in the 1920s it was Germany's most advanced long range radio station, continually upgraded with the latest equipment and serving as an experimental station for Telefunken to test new technology. At the end of World War II, invading Russian troops dismantled and removed the transmitting equipment. During the Cold War it served as the GDR's (East Germany's) international shortwave station Radio Berlin International (RBI), and was the East Bloc's second most powerful radio station, disseminating Communist propaganda to other countries. Since German Reunification in 1991 it has been operated by Deutsche Telekom, Germany's state telecommunication service. The original 1920 transmitter building designed by architect Herman Muthesius is still used; it is one of the many remaining buildings designed by that architect that is a protected cultural heritage site.

== History ==
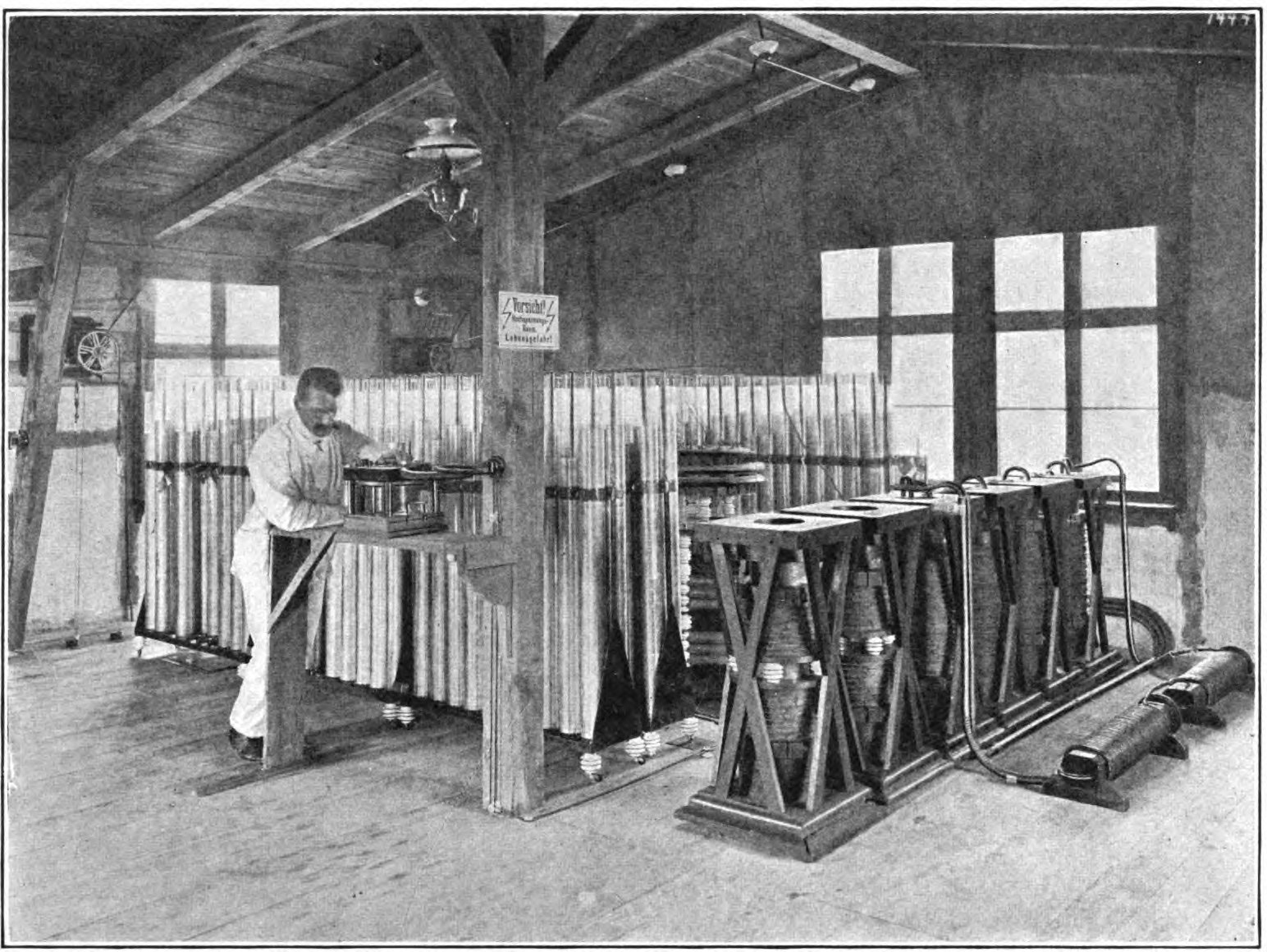
Original 25 kW spark-gap transmitter built 1906, showing large 400 μF Leyden jar capacitor bank (rear) and vertical spark gaps (right)

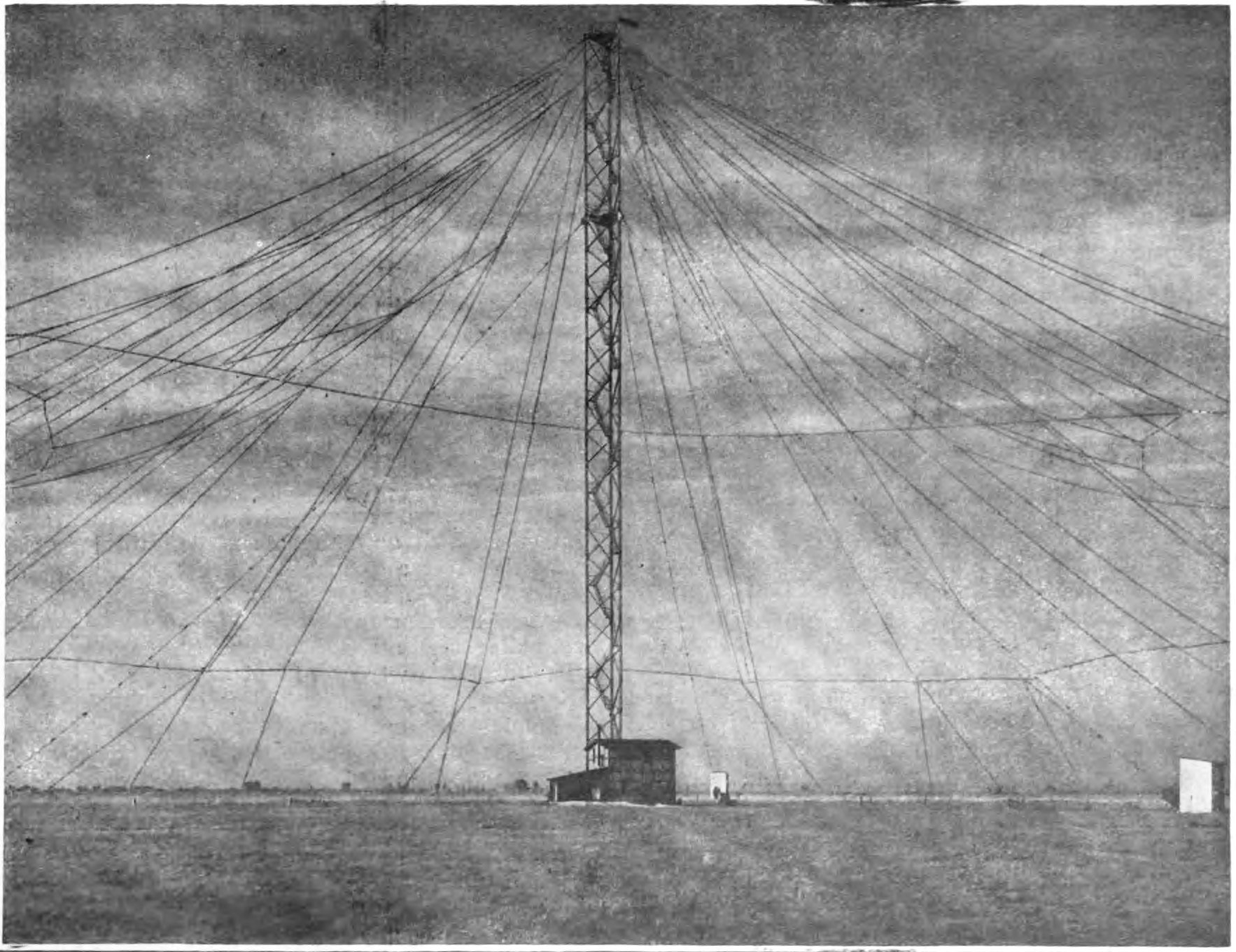
Umbrella antenna of transmitter

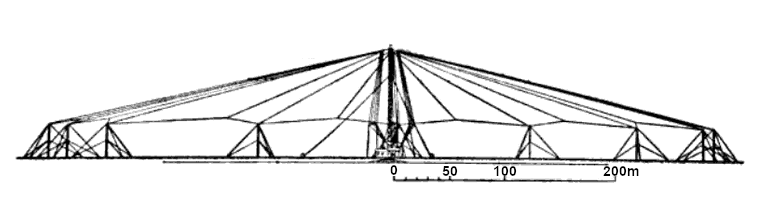
Umbrella antenna built in 1911

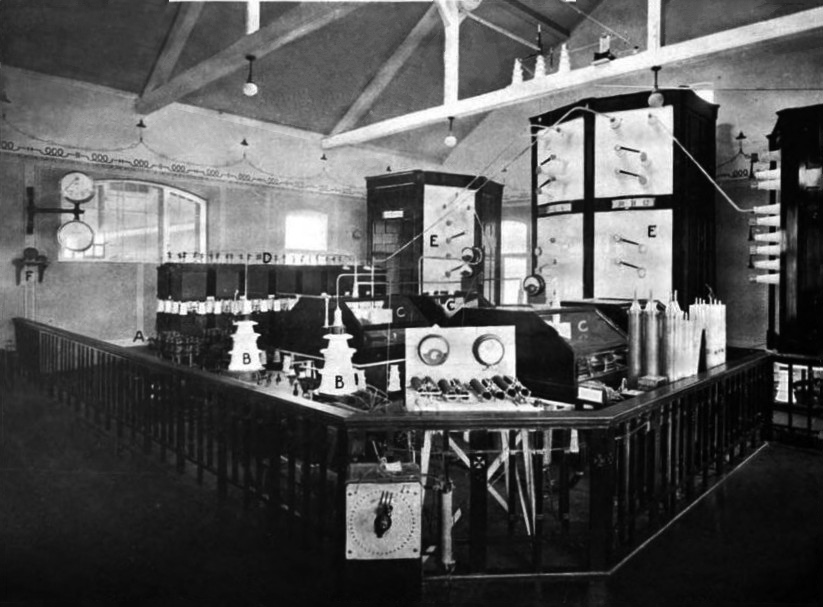
100 kW quenched spark transmitter installed in 1913, said to be the most powerful transmitter in the world at the time.

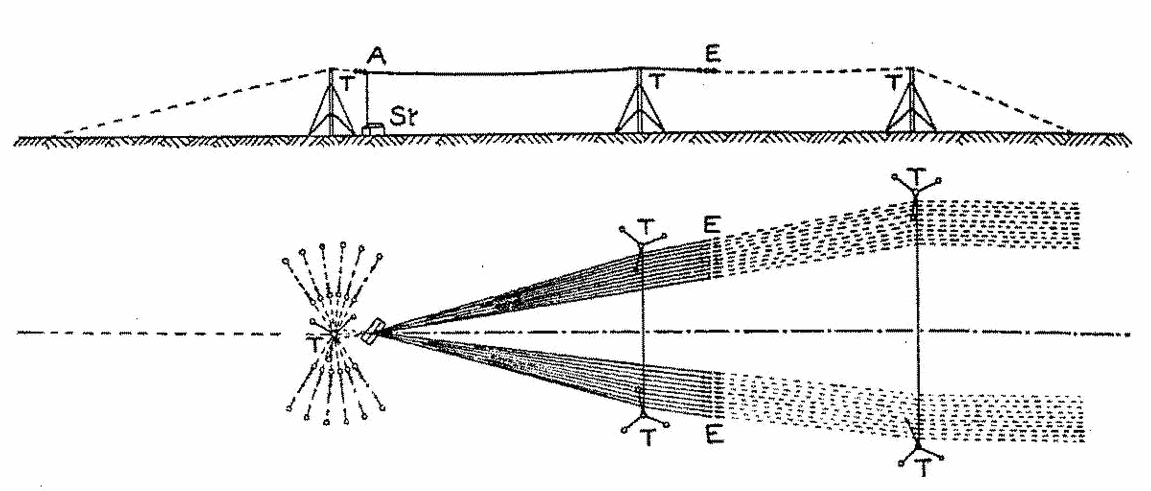
1,037 metre wire inverted-L flattop antenna aimed at Africa, built in 1913.

During the early years of the 20th century after Marconi's 1901 transatlantic radio demonstration, industrial nations began building networks of powerful longwave transoceanic radiotelegraphy stations to communicate with other countries and keep in touch with their overseas colonies. These transmitted telegram traffic with Morse code at high speed using paper tape machines. During World War I long-distance radio communication became a strategic technology; not only was it necessary to keep in timely contact with distant armies and naval fleets, but a nation without it could be isolated by an enemy cutting its submarine telegraph cables, as happened to Germany during both world wars.

The Telefunken company, founded in 1903 by German radio pioneers Adolf Slaby, Georg von Arco, and Karl Ferdinand Braun, was (with its rival, Britain's Marconi Company) one of the two giant wireless firms of the age. Built by Telefunken under the direction of engineer R. Hirsch on a 40-hectare property north of Nauen, leased from Fideikommissar Fritz Stotze, the Nauen station was Germany's first high power radio transmitter. Trial service was initiated on 9 August 1906, and operational service began on 16 August 1906 using a 25 kW spark gap transmitter designed by von Arco, which fed an umbrella antenna supported by a steel lattice mast 100 metres high, insulated from earth. Since the station had no commercial power, a 35 HP steam tractor was installed in the transmitter building, a light half timbered house, which powered a 50 Hz alternator producing 25 kilowatts (kW) output power. The transmitter worked at frequencies of 75 – 100 kHz with a radiated power of around 10 kW, and the station could be received at a range of about 3,500 kilometres (2,200 miles).

The station was financed by Germany's Post Office, which wanted to develop it as a strategic link with Germany's overseas colonies, as well as handling commercial telegram traffic to the Americas. In 1909 a post office official, Hans Bredow, became station director, who set about to achieve these goals by making Nauen a 'superpower' station.

In 1911 the station changed from an experimental to a commercial station, with call sign POZ. The steam power plant was increased to 100 kW and the transmitter was replaced with a new more efficient 35 kW quenched-spark transmitter which increased the range to about 5,300 kilometres (3,300 miles). In the same year the antenna tower was increased to 200 metres in height; however, this tower was destroyed by a storm on 31 March 1912. A temporary replacement antenna was suspended between two 120 metres high masts.

In 1913 the station was upgraded to communicate with Germany's African colony Togoland. The transmitter was replaced with a 100 kW quenched-spark transmitter, the most powerful transmitter in the world at the time. The omnidirectional umbrella antenna was replaced by a 1,037-meter (3,402 ft) long directional flattop antenna consisting of 20 parallel horizontal wires supported by five 120-meter (390 ft) towers, pointed at southwest Africa. These improvements gave the station a range of 9,000 kilometres (5,600 miles), allowing communication with all of Europe, North America, the coast of South America, and at night with Togoland.

In addition to the spark transmitter, in 1913 a 100 kW Joly-Arco alternator transmitter was installed. This was an early continuous wave radio transmitter technology invented by Georg von Arco similar to the Alexanderson alternator. It generated radio frequency current at 8 kHz using a rotating generator turned by an electric motor, which was increased in frequency to 32 kHz with two cascaded saturated core magnetic frequency doubler transformers before being applied to the antenna. This transmitter was capable of daylight transatlantic communication with its sister station in Sayville, Long Island, New York, while other transatlantic radio stations could only achieve transatlantic contact at night. Also an experimental 6 kW radiotelephony transmitter was built, one of the earliest AM transmitters, which allowed voice communication with Vienna, 640 kilometres (400 miles) distant.

=== First World War and the interwar period ===
Station in 1931

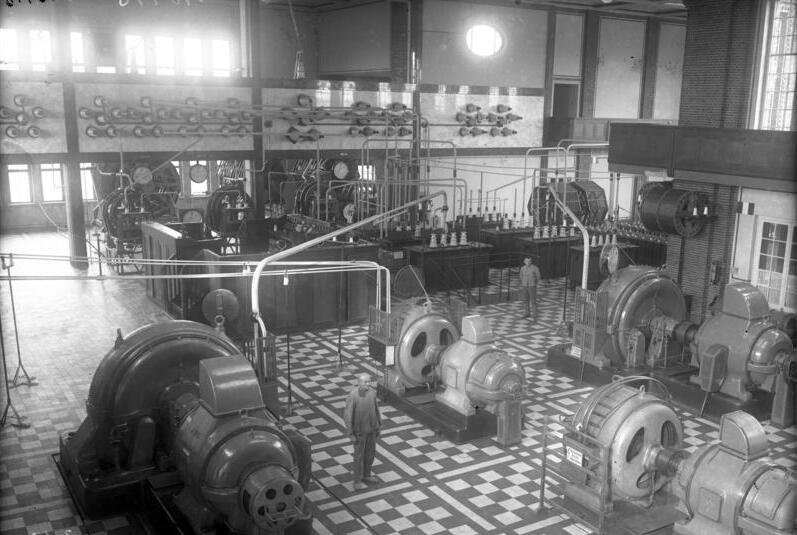
Alternator radio transmitters. The two in center were the 100 kW units from 1913. The two on the sides were the 400 kW units installed 1916. At rear are the frequency doubler transformers and tank circuits

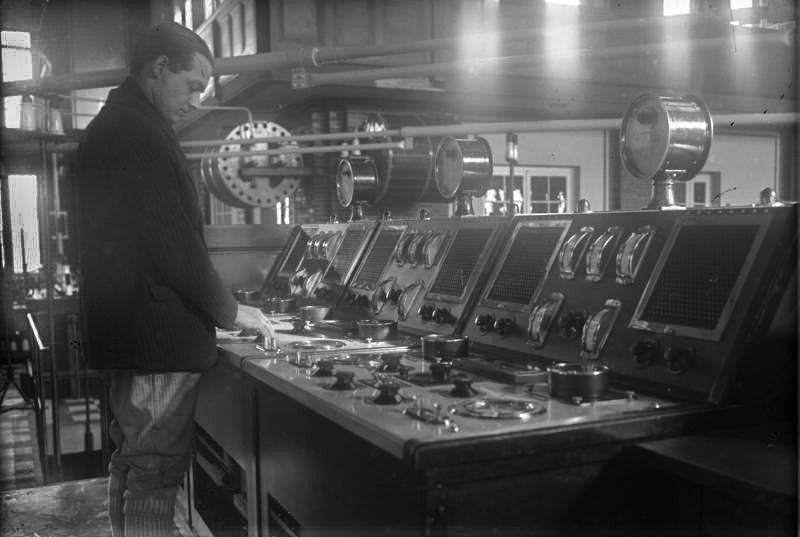
Control board for alternators

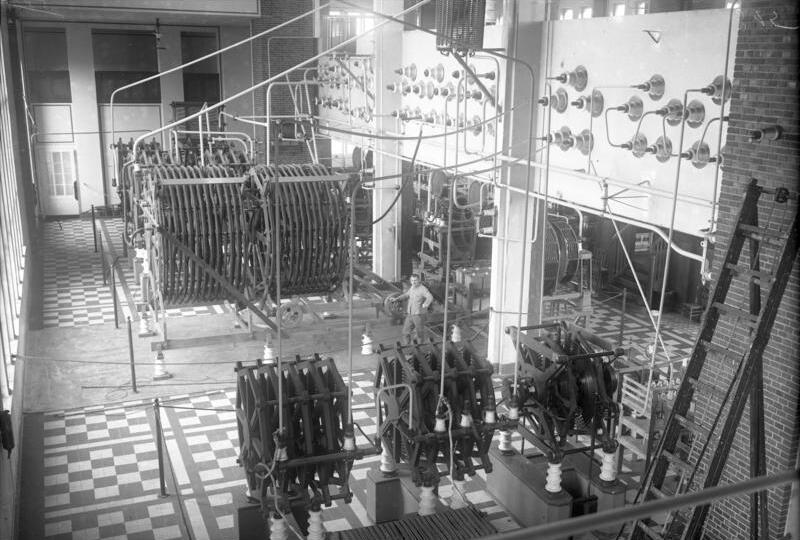
Output hall with antenna loading coils

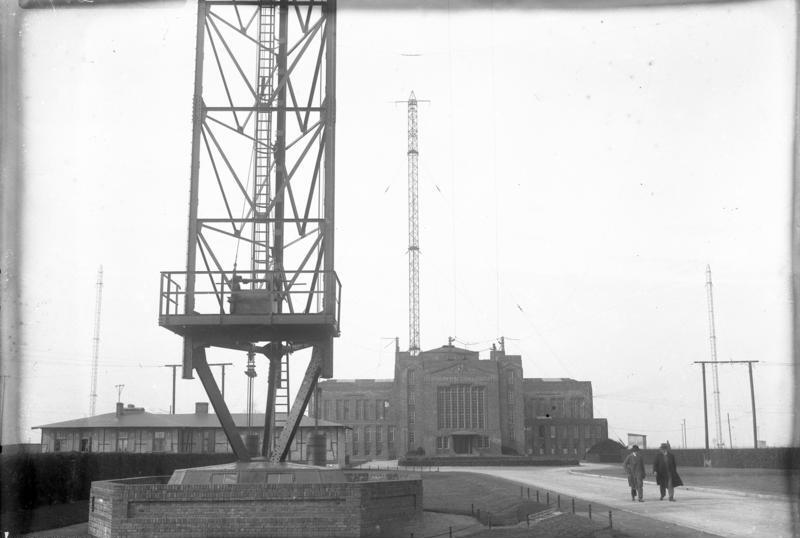
Base of mast

After the beginning of World War I in 1914, the station became very important because the transatlantic cables leading to Germany were cut by the British Navy. During the war, the station was run by the German Admiralty, which used it for military communication with its fleet as well as commercial radiotelegraphy traffic. The British Radio Intelligence Service devoted much effort into intercepting and decoding encrypted military communications from the station during the war.

In 1916, at the urging of Bredow, major additional development of the station took place. Two huge 400 kW Joly-Arco alternator transmitters were installed, which could work in parallel giving an output power of 800 kW; making the station by far the most powerful radio transmitter in the world. These were some of the largest alternator transmitters ever built, and operated at the limit of this technology. The alternator had a 1.65 meter diameter rotor weighing 7 tons, rotating at 1500 rpm. The rotor's 240 teeth (magnetic poles) generated 1200 amps alternating current at 450 volts and a frequency of 6 kHz. This was doubled twice by two cascaded frequency doubler transformers to give 24 kHz, which was applied to the antenna. The large doubler transformers, although 90% efficient, required a powerful forced-oil cooling system to remove the 40 kW waste heat. A system of switchable doubler and tripler transformers allowed the transmitter to operate on a range of frequencies: 12 kHz, 18 kHz, 24 kHz, 36 kHz, or 48 kHz. The antenna system was enormously increased in size. In 1920 the main flattop antenna, carried on two 260-metre (850 ft) and four 125-metre (410 ft) masts, was 2,484 metres (8,150 ft) long. These transmitters gave the station a range of 11,000 kilometres (6,800 miles), which was increased to 18,000 kilometres (11,000 miles) by the end of the war, essentially covering most of the world.

At a right angle to the large antenna was a smaller antenna, carried by three masts, which was used by the 100 kW transmitter, so the station could transmit on two frequencies at the same time.

During the war the Nauen station was Germany's main communication link with the outside world. Germany's Transocean news service broadcast overseas news summaries in English twice daily from Nauen, which could be received worldwide, to circumvent the censorship of Britain's cable network, to get their version of the news to the Americas and the Far East. In 1918 in World War 1 US president Woodrow Wilson transmitted a request for surrender to Nauen from the alternator station at New Brunswick, New Jersey.

A new transmitter building designed by Hermann Muthesius was erected in 1920, an Art Deco style cathedral-like structure to give space for more high power transmitting equipment. The modernized station was inaugurated on September 29, 1920 by German president Friedrich Ebert.

In the 1920s long distance radio communication shifted from the longwave to the shortwave bands with the discovery of the skywave (skip) propagation mechanism. The last longwave transmitter was installed at Nauen in 1923 and vacuum tube shortwave transmitters were installed after 1924. On 1 January 1932 the German Reichspost took over the station. It was considerably expanded and by 1939 was one of the biggest and most powerful communication complexes in the world. Although vacuum tube transmitters had long been the state of the art in the 1930s, the high power alternator transmitters were again modernized in 1937 for use in WW2 to communicate with Germany's U-boat fleet.

=== Second World War and the post-war period ===
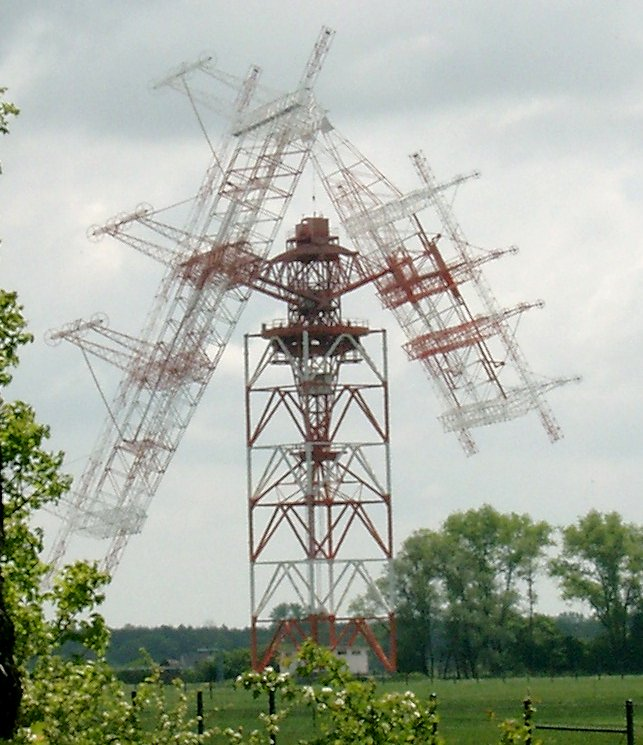
Long distance shortwave transmitting antenna at Nauen, 2004

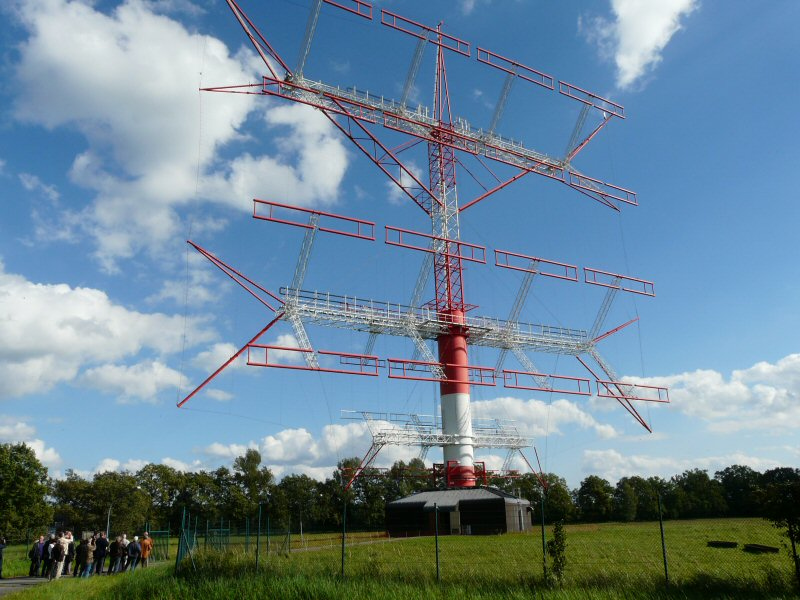
One of the four ALLISS antennas at Nauen, 2010

In World War II, the longwave transmitters were used by the military to transmit instructions to submerged submarines. Unlike higher frequency radio waves, the very low frequency (VLF) waves generated by the alternator transmitters could penetrate seawater and reach submerged submarines without the need for them to surface and become vulnerable to detection. The station survived World War II without damage, but after May 1945 was disassembled by Soviet occupation forces. All technical mechanisms were dismantled and the masts of the station were blown up. Whether and where the dismantled transmitters were used in the Soviet Union is unknown. The Muthesius building was also planned to be blown up, but this was prevented.

The building was used for potato storage up until 1955 when the communist German Democratic Republic (GDR, East Germany), in whose borders the station ended the war, began to use it as a radio station again. In 1959 it became the GDR's international shortwave broadcasting station, Radio DDR, which broadcast under the name Radio Berlin International (RBI). Between 1959 and 1989 21 transmitters with power up to 100 kW and 45 antenna systems were installed for worldwide radio communication. Between 1971 and 1981 three 500 kW superpower shortwave transmitters were installed, feeding 23 high gain curtain antennas positioned to broadcast to politically important countries. As the Eastern Bloc's second most powerful radio station after Moscow, it became important as a dissemination channel of Cold War propaganda to both Western and other East Bloc countries.

In 1964 two German companies built one of the first prototype rotating shortwave broadcast antennas nearby at the Dechtower dyke, which was used until the end of the Cold War. It has been preserved as a historical structure. This consisted of a 70 metre tower supporting two reflective dipole arrays weighing 40 and 70 tons covering 5.8 to 18.8 MHz that could be rotated 360° and tilted in elevation from horizontal to 30° to adjust to changing ionospheric skywave propagation conditions. It has a gain of 14.1 and 20.0 dB and is fully automatic in operation.

=== German reunification and after ===
On 3 October 1990, the day the GDR reunified with the Federal Republic of Germany, all transmitters were switched off and the station was provisionally transferred to German international shortwave broadcaster Deutsche Welle. In 1991 it was taken over by Deusche Bundespost Telecom, Germany's Federal telecommunications service. It was decided to upgrade the station with new transmitters and antennas. Four modular rotatable ALLISS antennas made by Thomcast GmbH and 500 kW transmitters type S4105 made by Telefunken were installed between 1995 and 1997.

When the Deutsche Bundespost was privatized, all transmitters were transferred to Deutsche Telekom AG as its legal successor. From 2001 the broadcasting division belonged to the subsidiary T-Systems, where it was run as a separate division Media & Broadcast. In preparation for a sale, it was spun off on June 1, 2007 to T-Systems Media & Broadcast GmbH (M&B). In January 2008, the Media & Broadcast GmbH was merged with the French network operator Télédiffusion de France (TDF); since February 15, 2008 it has been operating as Media Broadcast GmbH.

The company operates its own transmitter location in Nauen for shortwave broadcasting.
