= Hotel Lux =

Hotel in Moscow during the Soviet Union

- Люксъ
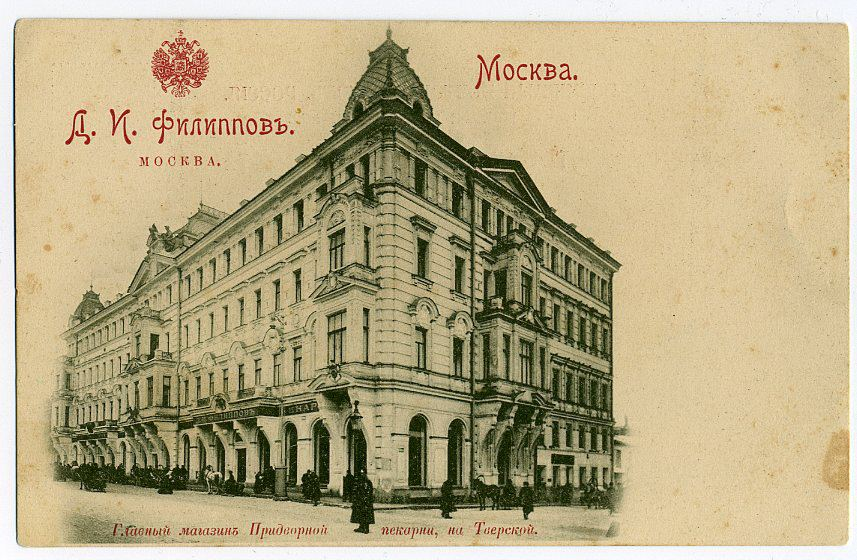
- The Hotel Frantsiya, later the Hotel Lux, c. 1911

General information
- Location: Moscow, Soviet Union
- Coordinates: 55°45′47″N 37°36′31″E
- Year built: 1911

Hotel Lux (Люксъ) was a hotel in Moscow during the Soviet Union, housing many leading exiled and visiting Communists. During the Nazi era, exiles from all over Europe went there, particularly from Germany. A number of them became leading figures in German politics in the postwar era. Initial reports of the hotel were good, although its problem with rats was mentioned as early as 1921. Communists from more than 50 countries came for congresses, for training or to work. By the 1930s, Joseph Stalin had come to regard the international character of the hotel with suspicion and its occupants as potential spies. His purges created an atmosphere of fear among the occupants, who were faced with mistrust, denunciations, and nightly arrests. The purges at the hotel peaked between 1936 and 1938. Germans who had fled Nazi Germany, seeking safety in the Soviet Union, were interrogated, arrested, tortured, and sent to forced labour camps. Most of the 178 leading German communists who were killed in Stalin's purges were residents of Hotel Lux.

== Early history ==
Originally named Hotel Frantsiya, the hotel was built as a luxury hotel in 1911 by the son of Ivan Filippov, a well-known Moscow baker, whose baked goods were delivered widely, including to the tsar's residence. Located at Tverskaya Street 36, it had four stories and housed the Filippov Café. The hotel was taken over by the Bolsheviks after the October Revolution and renamed Люксъ, i.e. Hotel de luxe. It came to be used by the Communist International (Comintern) as lodging for communist revolutionaries from other countries. In the 1920s, the hotel also served as a social and political contact point for communists from outside the Soviet Union. Guests were lodged according to hierarchy; more important individuals received better rooms. Some rooms were also used for meetings.

In June and July 1921, 600 delegates who came to the Third World Congress of the Communist International from 52 countries were housed at Hotel Lux. With the sudden influx of so many international revolutionaries, the hotel began to be known as the "headquarters of the world revolution". Germany alone sent 41 delegates. The Hamburg Uprising was discussed at the hotel, both before and after the events. After the Comintern was founded, many of the party's leading functionaries lived at the hotel, including Ernst Reuter, and the hotel became the best known of the Comintern's buildings, although its offices were elsewhere.

During the 1920s, the hotel bar was often occupied by Yan Karlovich Berzin and his recruiting staff.

== 1933 through World War II ==
In 1933, two stories were added, giving the hotel 300 rooms. The address, meanwhile, was changed to Gorky Street 10. 1933 was also the year Adolf Hitler gained power with the Machtergreifung and soon began to arrest and imprison his political opponents, arresting communists and socialists by the thousands. German communists began to flee to the Soviet Union and the Hotel Lux began to fill with German exiles.

In addition to party functionaries, there were advisors, translators and writers who came with their families. Employees were brought to the Comintern Central Committee's offices by bus. The hotel became overcrowded and conditions were difficult. The hotel was continually plagued by rats; the earliest reports of them were in 1921. There was hot water only twice a week, forcing people to shower in groups, as many as four people at a time. Communal kitchens for the use of residents cooked food next to boiling pots of diapers being sterilized. In spite of the conditions, initially, there was camaraderie among the residents. Children played in the halls and attended a German-language school, the Karl Liebknecht School, set up for the children of exiles. There were a number of English speaking residents in the thirties, living in the Lux. These were not refugees but dedicated Communists from Great Britain, Australia and the United States who went to "help build Socialism." In at least one case an American-born young man who lived with his parents in the Lux volunteered with the Red Army and was killed in combat in the War.

=== Stalin's purges ===
In 1934, after the murder of Sergei Kirov, Joseph Stalin began a campaign of political repression and persecution to cleanse the Party of "enemies of the people". Stalin viewed the foreign occupants of Hotel Lux as potential spies, or as a Moscow newspaper assumed of Germans (and Japanese) in 1937, they were working actively on behalf of their own country. By 1936, his Great Purge began to include the hotel's residents. The hotel then gained a second name, that of "the golden cage of the Comintern" because many would like to have left, but could not while being investigated. Between 1936 and 1938, many residents of the hotel were arrested and interrogated by the NKVD (People's Commissariat for Internal Affairs). Suspicion and betrayal created an atmosphere of fear. Arrests came in the middle of the night, so that some residents slept in their clothes, others paced the floor, or played games of concentration to mask the stress.

An investigation or arrest was prompted more by the atmosphere of terror than by charges of wrongdoing, which were often baseless. Walter Laqueur later wrote of the period, "There was no rhyme or reason as to who was arrested and who was not, the security organs were given a plan to fulfill, a certain number of people were to be arrested in a certain region, and from this stage on it was more or less a matter of accident at whose door the NKVD (the secret police) emissaries would knock in the early hours of the morning." The procedure was for the NKVD to knock, the accused was told to pack a small suitcase with a few things, get dressed and wait outside the door to be picked up and taken away. Then the NKVD returned to collect the accused and seal the door. One night, the NKVD knocked on the Langs' door and Franz Lang was told to get ready. Dutifully waiting outside his door to be picked up, the security police returned. "What are you doing standing around out here?", asked the NKVD. Lang replied that he'd been ordered to do so. "What's your room number?", asked the security officer. "Number 13." "We're only taking away the even numbers tonight!" Astonished, Lang went back to bed. Nor did the NKVD ever knock on his door again.

In the morning, the doors of those arrested were sealed; (Note: Years later, Margarete Buber-Neumann wrote of the nights that grew ever more painful and of discreetly looking for sealed doors the next morning. Her husband, Heinz Neumann was one of the leaders of the Communist Party of Germany from 1929 to 1932, but in 1937, was arrested at Hotel Lux by the NKVD and was later executed. In 1938, she was also arrested and in 1940, was returned to Germany, where she spent the rest of the war in Ravensbrück concentration camp.) the wives and children had to move to other quarters and were ostracized as "enemies of the state". (Note: Women were also taken away and even children.) The children of parents under investigation were placed in orphanages, where some died from illness and others rejected both their parents and their own German identity. Some of the adults arrested were sent to a gulag or were executed. Those who came back were regarded with suspicion, as was the case with Herbert Wehner, who was taken away and returned twice. Such people were assumed to have betrayed others under torture or to save themselves. In Wehner's case, that was what happened.

By 1938, in order to get upstairs in the hotel, a propusk was needed, a document that said one was authorized to get past the armed guard, standing in front of the elegant Art Nouveau elevator. Even high-level members of the Comintern could not get past the guard without a propusk.

The atmosphere affected the children. Rolf Schälike, who was a child at Hotel Lux, later wrote, "I grew up in Moscow, in the center of power, and state and non-state criminality, Gorky Street, Hotel Lux. It was the years 1938–1946. Around us too, there was juvenile violence. We played 'partisan and German fascists' in our Hotel Lux, and one kid in our group was hanged—for fun. He couldn't be revived again. There were frequent battles with iron bands with the kids from the neighboring building."

Of the 1400 leading German communists, a total of 178 were killed in Stalin's purges, nearly all of them residents of Hotel Lux. By comparison, the Nazis killed 222 of those 1400 leading German communists. Within the top leadership itself, there were 59 Politburo members between 1918 and 1945, six of whom were killed by Nazis and seven by the Stalinist purges. The saying among the German communists was, "What the Gestapo left of the Communist Party of Germany, the NKVD picked up." When Leon Trotsky was killed in August 1940, the purges at Hotel Lux stopped, bringing a brief respite to the exiles.

=== Evacuation and return ===
Ten months later, in June 1941, Operation Barbarossa began, Nazi Germany's assault on the Soviet Union. In 1941, the hotel was evacuated. The first residents returned in February 1942. At the end of World War II, the Ulbricht Group left Hotel Lux for the airport to return to Germany on 30 April 1945 to become the new leaders of the German Democratic Republic. The purpose of the trip and whether or not the assignment was temporary or a permanent return to Germany was not known to the whole group until they arrived in Berlin. Russian authorities had Wolfgang Leonhard evacuated with the Ulbricht Group, although the latter claimed he did not know the group. (Note: Leonhard's mother, Susanne Leonhard, was one of the founders of the KPD. She was arrested October 26, 1936 and spent 12 years in the Gulag. Wolfgang Leonhard attended Landschulheim Herrlingen for the 1932–1933 school year, then a boarding school in Stockholm. His mother came to visit in 1935, but couldn't remain in Sweden or return to Germany, so they fled to the Soviet Union, where he then attended the Karl Liebknecht School, a German-language school in Moscow for the children of exiles, living at a home for those children from September 1936 to 1939. After Hitler's invasion of the Soviet Union in 1941, he was evacuated with other Germans. He returned to Moscow in 1942 at the age of 21 and was trained at the Comintern school before becoming employed by the National Committee for a Free Germany.)

The last political residents left the hotel in 1954, either willingly or by eviction, and the hotel returned to normal, operating under the name "Hotel Tsentralnaya".

== Post-Soviet era ==
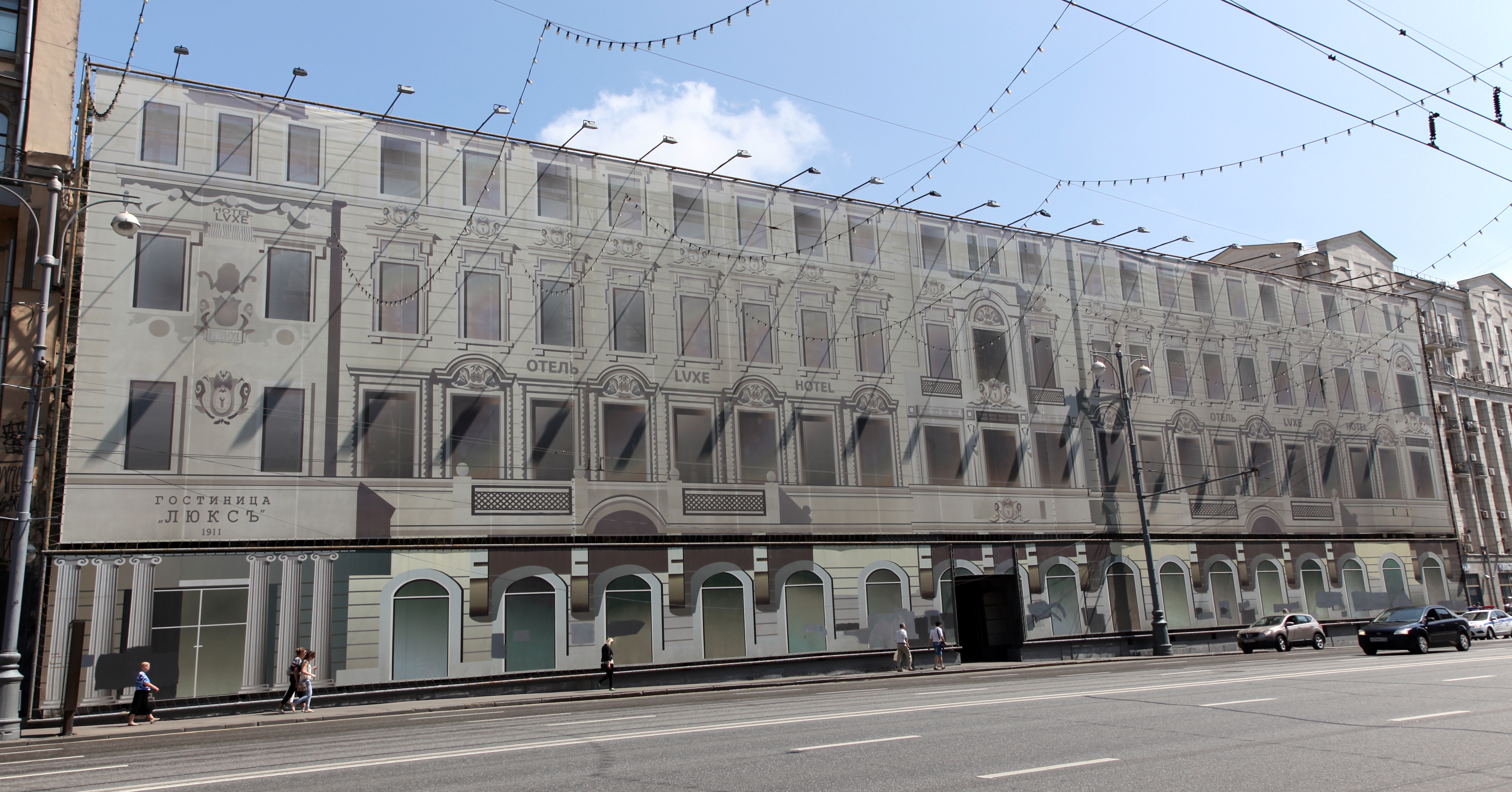
The former Hotel Lux in Moscow, 2013

After the collapse of communism, the hotel housed offices, small travel agencies, liquidation companies and other small businesses on the lower floors, the upper floors remained hotel rooms.

The building, still called Hotel Tsentralnaya, was bought by the holding company Unikor in 2007. Unikor and its majority shareholder, Boris Ivanishvili bought the hotel to renovate it and re-open it as a luxury hotel. There were mostly offices in the building at the time of its sale. The structure was demolished, with only the historic facade retained. In 2007, it was announced that the Mandarin Oriental Moscow, a luxury hotel, would be built behind the restored historic facade. The project was cancelled soon after. In 2019, it was again announced that a luxury hotel would be built, retaining the historic facade, this time the Corinthia Moscow Hotel.

The street name has been restored to Tverskaya; the building remains number 10.

== Legacy ==
Numerous guests and residents of Hotel Lux have written about the hotel, initially in reports and articles, later in books and memoirs. Early reports from before the purges were often positive, though mentions of rats appear from the beginning. Accommodations were described in favorable terms and the atmosphere as full of camaraderie.

In East Germany in the 1950s and 1960s, the Socialist Unity Party commissioned memoirs (Erinnerungsberichte) from former exiles who had lived there. These were carefully written official reports that sanitized and supported the official version of events. Franziska Reubens, who lived there with her husband and children, wrote in guarded language, "It is not easy to write about the memories from that time, to write about them honestly." Other people turned away from the Communist Party, some as a result of their exile in the Soviet Union, and wrote more bluntly and critically about the hotel, such as Ruth von Mayenburg, who in one passage, used cannibalism as a metaphor to describe the period. In 1978, von Mayenburg published the first history ever written about Hotel Lux.

== Notable residents from 1921–1954 ==
- Toivo Antikainen
- Johannes R. Becher
- Bolesław Bierut
- Willi Bredel
- Georgi Dimitrov
- Hugo Eberlein
- Zhou Enlai
- Mihály Farkas
- Ernst Fischer
- Ruth Fischer, was expelled from the Communist Party of Germany and held under house arrest for 10 months
- Klement Gottwald
- Antonio Gramsci
- Antonio Graziadei
- Julius Hay
- Jules Humbert-Droz
- Emmy Kaemmerer
- Lotte Kühn, 1935
- Aino Kuusinen
- Otto Ville Kuusinen
- Wolfgang Leonhard
- Ruth von Mayenburg, Communist Party of Austria
- Ho Chi Minh
- Imre Nagy
- Margarete Buber-Neumann, returned to Germany in 1940 under the Nazi-Soviet Pact
- Heinz Neumann, executed in 1937 in the Great Purge
- May O'Callaghan
- Wilhelm Pieck
- Theodor Plivier
- Karl Retzlaw
- Ernst Reuter
- Kang Sheng
- Rudolf Slánský
- Richard Sorge
- Ernst Thälmann
- Josip Broz Tito
- Palmiro Togliatti
- Walter Ulbricht, 1935
- Gustav von Wangenheim
- Ubaidullah Sindhi November 1922 to June 1923 Indian Revolutionary
- Herbert Wehner, 1937 to early 1941
- Erich Weinert
- Markus Wolf
- Clara Zetkin
- Hedda Zinner
- Ahmet Cevat Emre
- Nâzim Hikmet
- Vala Nureddin

== Film ==
- Wehner – die unerzählte Geschichte (2) Hotel Lux, Heinrich Breloer, documentary. Germany (1993) (in German)
- Hotel Lux, written and directed by Leander Haußmann. With Michael Herbig. Germany (2011) (in German)

== See also ==
- Hitler Youth Conspiracy, NKVD case pursued in 1938 (later found to be baseless), resulting in some 70 arrests, 40 executions
