= Taganka =

Taganka may refer to:

- Taganka, a historic neighbourhood in Tagansky District of Moscow, Russia
- Taganka Square in Moscow
- Taganka Theatre in Moscow
- Taganka Prison
- Taganka (song)

== See also ==
- Tagansky (disambiguation)
