= Karl Laurenz =

German resistance fighter, journalist and jurist (1905–1955)

- Born: Karl Anton Laurenz; 11 September 1905; Brünn (Brno), Austro-Hungary
- Died: 23 November 1955 (aged 50); Münchner Platz Prison, Dresden, East Germany
- Cause of death: Execution by guillotine
- Education: Masaryk University
- Occupations: legal assistant journalist court translator (simultaneous) spy
- Political party: DDFP (Czechoslovakia); SED (East Germany)
- Children: 2

Karl Laurenz (11 September 1905 – 23 November 1955) was trained as a lawyer, but worked, for much of his life, as a German journalist and specialist translator. He was executed as a western spy on the guillotine in Dresden, Saxony, Germany. Approximately ten minutes later, Laurenz's lover, Elli Barczatis, was also executed.

== Life ==
=== In Brünn/Brno ===
Karl Anton Laurenz was born and grew up in Brünn (since 1919 "Brno"), a large multi-cultural city, and at that time the principal city in the Austro-Hungarian territory of Moravia. His school career concluded successfully when he passed his school leaving exams ("Abitur"), which opened the way to university-level education. Remaining in Brünn, he studied Jurisprudence at the city's recently opened Masaryk University. His studies included a dissertation which he wrote with the title "De poena capitali mutandis in temporibus" ("On the Death Penalty through the ages"). By this time, following frontier changes mandated at Versailles, Austro-Hungary had ceased to exist, and Brno had ended up in Czechoslovakia. Defined according to its 1918 city limits, the city was predominantly German speaking, but several neighbouring municipalities had subsequently been concatenated into a new enlarged city area, as a result of which German speakers in Brno, such as the Laurenz family, were now a minority, albeit a very substantial minority. In 1924 Laurenz took a job as a contributing editor with the publishers of "Tageboten", while also moonlighting as a translator (from Czech to German), and sometimes obtaining work as a simultaneous court translator. He also worked as a correspondent for the Vienna-based Neue Freie Presse (newspaper) and the Ostrava-based "Morgen-Zeitung" ("Morning Newspaper").

Until 1939 Laurenz was a member of the German Democratic Liberal Party ("Deutsche Demokratische Freiheitspartei"; DDFP), founded in Czechoslovakia to preserve liberal political traditions on behalf of the German speaking minority. The party lost support after 1933, following the establishment of the more overtly nationalistic Sudeten German Party, but there is no sign that Laurenz himself defected from the DDFP as the political mood across Europe became progressively more shrill. In 1934, in a lead article that he wrote for the Neue Freie Presse, he condemned an attack by Nazi party supporters on a barracks in Brno, but otherwise he was for the most part apolitical. Even after the German invasion of 1938 Laurenz was not among the ethnic Germans who joined the Nazi party, and according to his own later testimony was reprimanded by the security services for his "lack of political sensitivity" (wegen "fehlendem politischem Fingerspitzengefühl") and then, despite his physical unsuitability, conscripted into the military in 1941. Laurenz himself later placed his political position during the 1930s firmly in the context of his work as a translator in the courts, which gave him deep insights into the political situation. With positive beliefs forfeited, he identified himself as a "pacifist multiculturalist" (als "pazifistischen Kosmopoliten"), acknowledging "just three gods": the law, justice and common sense.

Laurenz was a Roman Catholic. He married on 28 February 1929, which resulted in the birth, in around 1930, of two daughters who ended up, after the war, in Vienna and subsequently with Laurenz's brother at Kirrlach near Karlsruhe.

=== After the Second World War in the Soviet occupation zone ===
Following his conscription Laurenz had the good fortune not to be sent to the front line for several years, instead being assigned to work on the training of new recruits. Towards the end of the war, however, in February 1945 he was posted as a soldier to the western front: in April 1945 he deserted, ending up at Profen (south of Leipzig), where he was captured and was held for a few weeks as a US prisoner of war. Immediately after that he took a job in the coal industry, initially in Profen, and ending up, by the end of 1947, at the national head office of the Coal Department ("Zentralverwaltung Kohle") in Berlin. Since the war had ended, formally in May 1945, the entire central portion of what had been Germany had been administered as the Soviet occupation zone. In the early summer the US army, in the south of the country, had advanced into a region of Thuringia that had already been designated, by the allied commanders, as part of the Soviet occupation zone, but they had withdrawn in June 1945, leaving Laurenz in the region controlled by the Soviet military. In October 1949 the entire Soviet zone underwent a relaunched as the Soviet sponsored German Democratic Republic (East Germany). In economic and political terms the new country was closely modeled on the institutions of the Soviet Union itself. Internationally it was a member of the Soviet military bloc. Early in 1948 Laurenz became a member of the recently constructed Socialist Unity Party ("Sozialistische Einheitspartei Deutschlands" / SED), by now well on its way to becoming the ruling party in a new kind of German one-party dictatorship. In the course of his work in the National Coal Administration Department ("Zentralverwaltung Kohle") Laurenz became friendly with several female colleagues, including Elli Barczatis who after 1949 was employed as a secretary to the head of the "Coal Department", a political appointee called Gustav Sobottka. Towards the end of 1949 Laurenz and Barczatis became lovers.

Elli Barczatis was six years younger than Laurenz, and was building a successful career inside the SED (party) and, after 1949, in the German Democratic Republic. She was widely liked and trusted by colleagues who appreciated her friendly but always correct manner. On 6 April 1950 she was promoted to a prestigious and sensitive job as secretary to Otto Grotewohl, the prime minister. In contrast, Laurenz's career was going into reverse. Full details are hard to discern, although much later, following his arrest, hints emerged of inappropriate conduct towards female colleagues. At the start of 1950 his employers sent him to take up a post in Leipzig as a legal advisor to the central Germany Trading Centre for solid fuels ("feste Brennstoffe" coal and lignite). Not wishing to leave Berlin, Laurenz looked for work in journalism. In February 1950 he took a job with Berlin Radio, but was sacked after two weeks. He then took work with the Berliner Verlag publishing house, but was sacked from this in August 1950.

In 1950 he was expelled from the party for "conduct damaging to the party" ("parteischädigenden Verhaltens") and "deficient vigilance and bourgeois deviations" ("mangelnder Wachsamkeit und kleinbürgerlicher Abweichungen"). One mistake was speaking out against a new law cancelling weekend bonus payments for truck drivers.

In January 1951 Laurenz obtained work with a Berlin lawyer called Dr. Greffin which, as matters turned out, landed him in more trouble. Sources indicate that he was placed under surveillance from June 1951. In October 1951 he was accused of "favouring prisoners" because of legal advice that he was providing. This led to a five month prison term followed by an instruction never again to set foot in the German Democratic Republic. During this time the political and economic divisions that had been implicit in the division of Berlin into military occupation zones back in 1945 were beginning to be matched by physical impediments to free movement between East and West Berlin: on his release Laurenz established that Dr.Greffin had moved to West Berlin. Laurenz sought out Greffin and resumed working for him, albeit on a casual basis and without any fixed employment contract. It appears that after this point Laurenz no longer had any full-time employment.

Frustrated, Laurenz became increasingly ambivalent in his attitude to the Eastern version of Germany, quietly becoming more positive about the German Federal Republic (West Germany). He linked up with Clemens Laby, a former colleague from their time together at the National Coal Administration Department. Laby had already relocated from East to West Berlin a few years before. Through Laby, Laurenz met a man called Schubert. Schubert and Laby were both working for the US sponsored Gehlen Organization, the forerunner of the West German Intelligence Service. There is speculation that "Schubert" was a cover name used by West Germany's "chief spy", Reinhard Gehlen himself. According to Laurenz's later testimony, Laby introduced Schubert as the head of "some West German intelligence service", and explained that they wished to recruit Laurenz. In return for a monthly payment of 400 Marks Laurenz would report on economic matters, politics and culture in East Germany. Military matters would be expressly excluded.

By 1952, at the latest, Laurenz was working as a spy for the service, but without knowing precisely which secret service he was working for. Elli Barczatis, as the trusted secretary of Otto Grotewohl, enjoyed access to secret documents which she showed Laurenz in the belief that he needed them for his work as a journalist. In the files of West German intelligence the operation is identified with the cover name "Daisy" ("Gänseblümchen"). In the files of the East German Ministry for State Security ("Stasi") the code name "Sylvester" is used. Over the years Laurenz was paid several thousand Marks, while Elli Barczatis received from her lover a string of gifts large and small, ranging from chocolates to a radio receiver.

=== Leisurely investigation ===
The authorities were already investigating Laurenz in 1951. Informers were recruited to report on Barczatis and her social circle, following her not merely in East Berlin but also West Berlin where she sometimes accompanied Laurenz for his meetings with his old drinking buddy, Laby. In-coming and out-going mail was scrutinised. From 27 March 1953 the Stasi reports use a cover name for Laurenz, identifying him as "Knesel". The reports on their movements were sometimes formidably detailed and precise in terms of times and places, and a certain amount of suspicious activity was reported as early as 1951, but until late in 1954 the investigators came up with little usable evidence. In the end the authorities set a trap. In November 1954 a hair was carefully attached to on a letter from Otto Grotewohl to the Soviet Foreign Minister, Vyacheslav Molotov. When the letter was inspected the next day, after it had passed through the hands of Barczatis, the hair had disappeared, which caused the investigators to suspect that someone had handled the letter far more thoroughly than would have been necessary merely to file it away: the inference was that someone - Barczatis - had removed the letter without authorisation and taken it home, filing it back in the correct safe the next day. Stasi investigators now set a series of further traps. Under judicial pressure at her subsequent trial, Barczatis confirmed that she had taken papers home in order to show them to Laurenz, but this was never proven.

=== Arrest and questioning ===
His arrest was originally scheduled for 8 December 1954, but was deferred. Reasons for the deferral unclear. In the end Laurenz was arrested at around 11.30 on 4 March 1955, close to his home at Vinetastraße 49 in Berlin-Pankow. Elli Barczatis was arrested some six hours later as she left her work. They were taken initially to the police station at Berlin-Lichtenberg. The next six months were spent held under investigatory detention at the Berlin-Hohenschönhausen prison. Laurenz was interrogated by a Stasi officer called Gerhard Niebling. Records indicate that he confessed early on, towards the end of March 1955, but then retracted his confession, comparing the tactics employed by the Stasi with those that he had evidently experienced at the hands of the Nazi security services and the Gestapo. The long hours of nocturnal interrogation broke him down. A routine was evolved whereby he underwent twelve hour interrogation sessions through the night, and was then sleep deprived during the hours of daylight.

=== Trial and execution ===
On 17 June 1955 the investigation was finally completed, with a recommendation to the court that the ensuing trial should be conducted in closed court. The trial, thought to have taken place in Berlin, was held on 23 September 1955. It is believed to have lasted approximately 13 hours and was recorded. A version of the recording, reduced to approximately 320 minutes, was found among the Stasi archives following the demise of the East German regime. Judge Walter Ziegler presided over the Nbr. 1 Criminal bench ("1. Strafsenat") of the Supreme Court. Neither Barczatis nor Laurenz had any legal representation. Apart from the two of them, the court officers and the prosecutors, only Stasi officers were present in court.

The original recommendation had been for life sentences, but the court condemned both defendants to death for "Boycott Agitation" under article §6 of the constitution. These were the eighth and ninth death sentences handed out by this court in 1955. President Pieck rejected an appeal for clemency on 11 November 1955.

At around 3 in the morning on 23 November 1955 Laurenz was taken from his cell to the execution room at the National Execution Facility in Dresden and guillotined. Elli Barczatis was guillotined approximately ten minutes later. Other sources indicate that Barczatis was the first to be guillotined. The bodies were cremated.

Laurenz was posthumously rehabilitated by the Berlin district court on 28 November 2006.

== Further context and evaluation ==
Karl Laurenz consistently downplayed the significance and the level of detail in the information that he has passed to the west.

"I wrote about the Berlin Conference, I wrote about the ... currency reforms [affecting the East German Mark's convertibility], I wrote about the 21st Plenum [of the party], I glossed over things that I thought could or should be glossed over, for instance where something had already been written up in the western press, where in some public building or other that I knew, the toilets were out of order. .... It was in any case annoying to get hold of these two reports in a week, whereby there was no longer a need to report on something that was already in the newspaper or on the radio. I knew from Laby that the organisation in West Berlin already had a radio [listening] facility able to pass on without delay important news items broadcast on the radio. And I must emphasize that throughout my two years of activity, not one of my own reports was passed on by the radio."

"Ich habe geschrieben über die Berliner Konferenz, ich habe geschrieben über die … Umstellung auf Goldbasis unserer Währung, ich habe über das 21. Plenum geschrieben, ich habe gewisse Dinge glossiert, die mir glossierenswert erschienen, z. B. wenn irgendwo […] in der demokratischen Presse geschrieben worden war, dass bei irgendeinem Bau, was weiß ich, die Toiletten nicht funktionierten. […] Es war jedenfalls ein Krampf, diese zwei Meldungen in der Woche zusammenzubekommen, denn ich durfte grundsätzlich nichts mehr berichten, was bereits in der Zeitung stand oder durch den Rundfunk gegeben war. Von Laby weiß ich, dass die Organisation in Westberlin eine eigene Funkanlage hatte, um wichtige Nachrichten per Funk sofort weiterzugeben. Und ich muss feststellen, dass in meiner ganzen zweijährigen Tätigkeit von mir aus nicht eine einzige Meldung per Funk weitergegeben worden ist."

Karl Laurenz (as quoted in the trial transcript which turned up after reunification)

The East German media were not able to report specifically on the trial which was held behind closed doors "in camera". But they did report in more general terms a massive unmasking and the successful arrest of more than 1,000 "Gehlen spies". Most of these were, of course, not spies but political detainees.

Contrasting assessments exist concerning the importance of Laurenz and Barczatis to western intelligence. Those who identify them as important sources take their lead from the former western intelligence chief, Reinhard Gehlen, who published his memoirs in 1971, describing Barczatis as "the first important link in the other part of Germany" ("der ersten wichtigen Verbindungen im anderen Teil Deutschlands"). He thanked her, posthumously, for her "committed and successful work" ("hingebungsvolle und erfolgreiche Tätigkeit"). Much subsequent comment has concluded that Gehlen, whose intelligence career had been widely discredited by the time he wrote his memoirs thanks, above all, to Heinz Felfe, had reasons of his own to emphasize any available positive aspects of the role played by the West German intelligence service during the early 1950s.

Since the trial records have become available, it has become evident that many of the facts which the court concluded Barczatis had passed to Laurenz for onward transmission to his western handlers involved agenda items that could be found in the newspapers in both East and West Germany, concerning matters such as the scheduling of formal visits by Prime Minister Grotewohl. Possibly of more interest to western intelligence would have been information on economic and industrial matters, such as supply shortages of certain raw materials, or challenges involved in feeding the population, but here again, the espionage alleged seems to have been strangely trivial. The court gave close attention to a problem in which Grotewohl's office became involved that had arisen in Dresden in December 1953, when bakers had been unable to produce traditional Christmas bread because the authorities, ignorant of the special characteristics of Christmas bread in Dresden, had failed to provide sufficient raisins.

Judge Helene Kleine, one of the panel of judges who had condemned Barczatis to death, was still alive in 1995, and was charged with manslaughter, false imprisonment and legal violations. The court determined that Kleine and her fellow judges had knowingly imposed disproportionately heavy penalties, and she was sentenced to a five-year jail term. The sentence was suspended, however.
