= Laby =

Laby may refer to:

== People ==
- Clemens Laby (1900–1984), German engineer
- Jean Laby (1915–2008), Australian physicist
- T. H. Laby (1880–1946), Australian physicist and chemist
- Laby, a character from Elsword

== Places ==
- Läby, Sweden
