= Elli Barczatis =

German typist-secretary (1912–1955)

- Born: Helene Barczatis; 7 January 1912; Berlin, Kingdom of Prussia, Germany
- Died: 23 November 1955 (aged 43); Münchner Platz Prison, Dresden, East Germany
- Cause of death: Execution by guillotine
- Occupation: Typist-secretary
- Political party: SED

Helene "Elli" Barczatis (7 January 1912 – 23 November 1955) was a typist-secretary who worked between April 1950 and January 1953 as the head secretary of the East German prime minister, Otto Grotewohl. Convicted of espionage, she and her lover Karl Laurenz were guillotined on 23 November 1955.

== Life ==
=== Early years ===
Elli Barczatis was born in Berlin in 1912, the daughter of a master tailor. She attended school locally between 1918 and 1926 before embarking on a traineeship as a saleswoman with a small publishing company, "Banzhaff-Verlag". She switched in 1928, working as a typist for a book dealership called Karl Block. In 1929 she joined the Gewerkschaftsbund der Angestellten, a trades union for clerical workers, and between 1929 and 1933 attended evening classes in order to gain a higher secretarial qualification. A succession of further secretarial positions followed, always in Berlin where she lived with and looked after her mother. On 3 February 1945, the home she occupied with her mother and two sisters was destroyed by aerial bombing.

=== Soviet occupation zone ===
In 1945, Barczatis joined the Free German Trade Union Federation "Freier Deutscher Gewerkschaftsbund" / FDGB), and the next year she joined the newly formed Socialist Unity Party ("Sozialistische Einheitspartei Deutschlands" / SED). Although it was not instantly apparent to everyone, the creation of the SED was a necessary precondition for a return to one-party dictatorship in the Soviet occupied parts of Germany. There are suggestions that Barczatis' own enrolment was not driven by deep political conviction, but rather can be seen as a shrewd career move at a time of savage economic destitution across Germany. She also became a member of the Society for German–Soviet Friendship and of the Democratic Women's League of Germany, which would cement her credentials in the eyes of the authorities as a reliable person.

In the years following the war she worked as a typist and secretary for various forms and organisations. She was hired in January 1946 to work as a secretary for Gustav Sobottka, a politician who at the time was the president of the National Administration for Energy Supplies ("Zentralverwaltung der Brennstoffindustrie"). It was while working here that she got to know Karl Laurenz. On 4 April 1950, Barczatis was switched to a job as chief secretary to Otto Grotewohl, the Prime Minister of East Germany. In 1951, she attended a course at the regional party academy. In January 1953, she resigned from her secretarial position in order to attend a training course at the "Walter Ulbricht" Management College (Verwaltungsakademie „Walter Ulbricht“). Her course completed, she returned briefly in May 1953 to her secretarial work for Grotewohl. In June 1953, she moved on again, becoming a senior clerical officer in the prime minister's economic office. She retained that post until her arrest in June 1955. Meanwhile, she continued to live with her mother and her sister, Herta, at an apartment in the Rudower Straße in Berlin-Köpenick.

== Espionage ==
=== Stasi investigation ===
On 26 June 1951 the Ministry for State Security (Stasi) launched what they termed Group Action "Sylvester" against Elli Barczatis and Karl Laurenz. The exercise involved an intensive Stasi surveillance operation.

The investigation was triggered by a former colleague of Elli Barczatis called Johanna Lexow. They had worked together at the "National Administration for Energy Supplies" ("Zentralverwaltung der Brennstoffindustrie"). Lexow reported suspicious behaviour by Barczatis which she said had taken place on the afternoon of 20 December 1950 between 15.30 and 18.00 in the cafe attached to the restaurant of a retail distribution centre (Handelsorganisation). Lexow saw Barczatis acting suspiciously with a womaniser called Karl Laurenz. On arriving in the cafe, Lexow had spotted Laurenz sitting alone, half hidden by a pillar, in a corner: she had assumed he was waiting to meet his longstanding girlfriend, whom she identified in her statement as "Miss Rettschlag". She then also noticed Elli Barczatis, whom she knew was now working a secretary to the prime minister, sitting at a separate table some distance away. However, Laurenz now got up from his table, paid his bill, exchanged looks with Barczatis and left the cafe. Barczatis then reached into a large bag that she had with her and removed a fat bundle of papers which she placed in another bag. She then left the cafe without paying. She returned shortly afterwards and placed a smaller bag in the larger bag and chatted with another woman sitting at the same table as she. Lexow inferred that she had seen Barczatis, the prime minister's secretary, handing over documents in a suspicious manner.

A few days later Joanna Lexow reported what she had seen at her place of work, and her concerns were passed on to the Ministry for State Security. Stasi files from this point on identify their informant, Johanna Lexow, under the cover name "Grünspan" (literally: "Verdigris").

=== Karl Laurenz ===
In fact, since the autumn of 1949 Karl Laurenz and Elli Barczatis had been lovers. At the time when they were spotted behaving suspiciously in a cafe, Laurenz had not been identified as a spy, although he had gained a certain notoriety because of his sometimes inappropriate behaviour with female colleagues: this may be why Johanna Lexow paid particular attention when she spotted him sitting on his own at a small table behind a pillar in the cafe. In 1950, Karl Laurenz was expelled from the ruling party because of "conduct damaging to the party" (wegen „parteischädigenden Verhaltens“"). In 1951 he was arrested and for a period detained, after which he worked as a journalist and simultaneous translator.

From 1952 - possibly earlier - Karl Laurenz was working with the Gehlen Organization, an intelligence agency established under the auspices of the US occupation authorities in West Germany. The Gehlen Organization later formed the basis for the establishment of the West German Federal Intelligence Service, but in 1952 it was still something of a maverick operation, reflecting the personality of Reinhard Gehlen. Elli Barczatis, the trusted secretary to prime minister Otto Grotewohl, was able to access secret documents, presumably including material that she had typed for her employer, and pass them to her lover, believing that he needed them for his work as a journalist.

During the early 1950s the political division of Berlin was not yet matched by physical divisions, and Laurenz regularly went to the western sector (later West Berlin) to meet Clemens Laby, his contact from the West German intelligence service. According to testimony which they gave in 1955, sometimes Barczatis accompanied him, being introduced to Laby simply as Laurenz's girlfriend: sometimes Laurenz went alone. It seems that for Barczatis, Clemens Laby and Karl Laurenz were simply old friends who liked to meet up occasionally and talk about old times. Later, when he faced trial, it would be repeatedly put to Laurenz that Barczatis must have been aware of the true nature of the relationship between himself and Laby, but Laurenz repeatedly insisted that he made a point of keeping this from her, "for her own protection". Barczatis was nevertheless given a code name by the western intelligence services who identified her as "Gänseblümchen" (literally: "Little daisy flower"). In return for the information that he handed over, Laurenz received several thousand western Marks over the years. Barczatis was well rewarded by Laurenz with gifts small and large, ranging from chocolate to a radio receiver.

=== A slow investigation ===
Despite having started to investigate in January 1951, at the end of 1954 the Stasi investigators still had no usable evidence against Barczatis. Frequently when agents were sent to follow her they lost her when she used the local railway (S-Bahn) to cross into the western sector. Neither telephone surveillance nor intercepting her mail produced any compelling evidence of culpability. In the end she was caught when the Stasi planted some specially prepared documents in the minister's safe, which Barczatis then took home with her. She later testified that she had taken these papers home in order to show them to Laurenz, though this detail could never be proven.

=== Arrest and questioning ===
Her arrest was originally scheduled for 8 December 1954, but was deferred. In the end Elli Barczatis was arrested at around 17.30 on 4 March 1955, while she was leaving work at her ministry office: Laurenz had already been arrested approximately six hours earlier the same day, in the street close to his home. They were taken initially to the police station at Berlin-Lichtenberg. The next six months were spent held under investigatory detention at the Berlin-Hohenschönhausen prison. Laurenz was interrogated by a Stasi officer called Gerhard Niebling. Barczatis was initially interrogated by a more junior officer called Karli Coburger, but after 23 March 1955 Niebling took over her interrogation which now ran in parallel with that of Laurenz. Laurenz confessed his guilt towards the end of March 1955, but then retracted his confession, comparing the tactics employed by the Stasi with those that he had evidently experienced at the hands of the Nazi security services and the Gestapo. The long hours of nocturnal interrogation broke him down. A routine was evolved whereby he underwent twelve hour interrogation sessions through the night, and was then sleep deprived during the hours of daylight. Despite the Stasi efforts to play the two off them off against one another, Laurenz made great efforts to exculpate his lover, but without success. After many hours during which they were interrogated together, Barczatis confessed in full and at her subsequent trial displayed remorse.

=== Trial and execution ===
On 17 June 1955 the investigation was finally completed, with a recommendation to the court that the ensuing trial should be conducted in closed court. The trial itself, thought to have taken place in Berlin, was held on 23 September 1955. It is thought to have lasted approximately 13 hours and was recorded. A version of the recording, reduced to approximately 320 minutes, was found among the Stasi archives following the demise of the East German regime. Judge Walter Ziegler presided over the Nbr. 1 Criminal bench ("1. Strafsenat") of the Supreme Court. Neither Barczatis nor Laurenz had any legal representation. Apart from the two of them, the court officers and the prosecutors, only Stasi officers were present in court.

The original recommendation had been for life sentences, but the court condemned both defendants to death for "Boycott Agitation" under article §6 of the constitution. These were the eighth and ninth death sentences handed out by this court in 1955. President Pieck rejected an appeal for clemency on 11 November 1955.

At around 3 in the morning on 23 November 1955, Karl Laurenz was taken from his cell to the execution room at the National Execution Facility in Dresden and guillotined. Elli Barczatis was guillotined approximately ten minutes later. Other sources indicate that Barczatis was the first to be guillotined. The official minutes of the event record that her execution took approximately three seconds.

Their bodies were cremated.

=== Communication ===
It was only some months later that the public became aware of the trial, the verdict and the execution. During the first part of 1956 the families knew nothing of the whereabouts of Barczatis and Laurenz. However, on 7 March 1956 Elli's younger sister, Herta Barczatis, told a reporter from the New York Times that she had learned that her sister had been condemned to death as a "spy for the United States" and sentenced to death. She thought it probable that Elli had been executed.

=== Rehabilitation ===
Elli Barczatis was officially rehabilitated by the Berlin District Court on 28 November 2006.

== Further context and evaluation ==
The East German media were not able to report specifically on the Barczatis case, because the trial was held behind closed doors in camera. But they did report in more general terms a massive unmasking and the successful arrest of more than 1,000 "Gehlen spies". Most of these were, of course, not spies but political detainees.

Contrasting assessments exist concerning the importance of Elli Barczatis to western intelligence. There are those who identify her as an important agent. These take their lead from the former western intelligence chief, Reinhard Gehlen, who published his memoirs in 1971, describing Barczatis as "the first important link in the other part of Germany" ("der ersten wichtigen Verbindungen im anderen Teil Deutschlands"). He thanked her, posthumously, for her "committed and successful work" ("hingebungsvolle und erfolgreiche Tätigkeit"). Much subsequent comment has concluded that Gehlen, whose intelligence career had been widely discredited by the time he wrote his memoirs thanks, above all, to Heinz Felfe, had reasons of his own to emphasize any available positive aspects of the role played by the West German intelligence service during the 1950s.

Since the records of her trial have become available it has become evident that many of the "facts" which the court concluded Barczatis had passed to Laurenz for onward transmission to his western handler involved agenda items that could be found in the newspapers in both East and West Germany, concerning matters such as the scheduling of formal visits by Prime Minister Grotewohl. Possibly of more interest to western intelligence would have been information on economic and industrial matters, such as supply shortages of certain raw materials, or challenges involved in feeding the population, but here again, the espionage alleged seems to have been strangely trivial. The court gave close attention to a problem in which Grotewohl's office became involved that had arisen in Dresden in December 1953, when bakers had been unable to produce traditional Christmas bread because the authorities, ignorant of the special characteristics of Christmas bread in Dresden, had failed to provide sufficient raisins.

One of the panel of judges that condemned Barczatis to death in 1955 was still alive in 1995, when Judge Helene Heymann (back in 1955 Judge Helene Kleine) found herself facing the Berlin District Court on charges of manslaughter, false imprisonment and legal violations. The court determined that Kleine and her fellow judges had knowingly imposed disproportionately heavy penalties, and she was herself sentenced to a five-year jail term. The sentence was suspended, however.
