= MS Sarny =

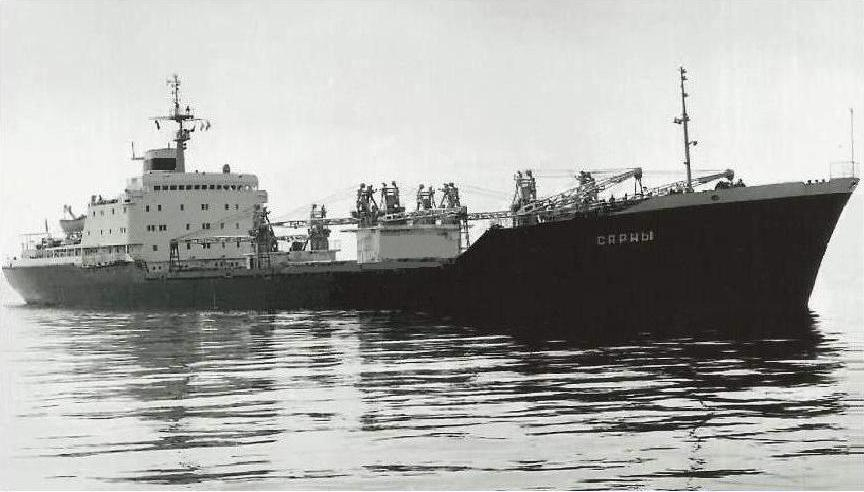
- Soviet general cargo ship Сарны.

History
- Name: Sarny; (Russian: Сарны); Shipyard Number: 1103; Call sign: Register Number: М-29039; IMO Number: 6919215
- Namesake: Slavyansk class of cargo ships
- Owner: 1967–1992: Black Sea Shipping Company, (Soviet Union) USSR; 1992–1997: GSK Black Sea Shipping Company, Ukraine
- Operator: 1967–1992: Black Sea Shipping Company, (Soviet Union) USSR; 1992–1997: GSK Black Sea Shipping Company, Ukraine
- Port of registry: 1967–1997: Odessa, from 1967 to 1992 (Soviet Union) USSR and from 1992 to 1997 Ukraine
- Builder: Kherson Shipyard - Kherson, Ukrainian SSR, USSR.
- Fate: sign off Black Sea Shipping Company in February 1996; scrapped in Alang in March 1996 or in 1997

General characteristics
- Type: freighter, tweendecker
- Tonnage: GT 10,023 mt; Summer DW: 13,805 mt; Displacement: 19,260 mt
- Length: length overall 501 ft (152.8 m)
- Beam: 68 ft (20.6 m)
- Height: высота борта 39.4 ft (12.0 m)
- Draught: 18.3 ft (5.59 m); 29.6 ft (9.02 m); 30.7 ft (9.37 m)
- Propulsion: Soviet diesel "6ДКРН 74/160-2" was built in Bryansk Engineering Plant (Russian: Брянский машиностроительный завод), USSR; one main engine 9,000 hp (1 х 6,620 kW)
- Speed: 16.0; 17.0; 17.7 knots
- Capacity: 5 cargo holds; total bale capacity: 17,423 cub.m.; total grain Capacity: 19,170 cub.m.; GRT 10,023; NRT 5,572
- Crew: 49 crew + 4 cadets + 5 passengers
- Notes: Navigation area: Not limited.; Cruising range: 12,000 miles

Sarny (Russian: Сарны) was a merchant ship of Black Sea Shipping Company (Soviet Union), tweendecker type general cargo ship, project 1563. This ship is one of the Slavyansk class of cargo ships. The ship was named in honor of the city Sarny in the Ukrainian SSR, USSR.

== Ship's data. ==
This class of ships, Project 1563, was developed at the Central Design Bureau Chernomorsudoproekt (CDB ChSP) in Nikolayev. Major designer: the main construktor Pankov V.A.

The ship was built in Kherson shipyard in 1967 and handed over to Black Sea Shipping Company, home port Odessa.

Five cargo holds. All ships of this class of cargo ships were built without longitudinal partitions and without side tanks in cargo holds.

Cargo gear - 9 cranes with cargo capacity 5 tons each.

== History ==
The cargo ship Sarny was built in Kherson Shipyard and handed over to Black Sea Shipping Company on the 31 of December, 1967.

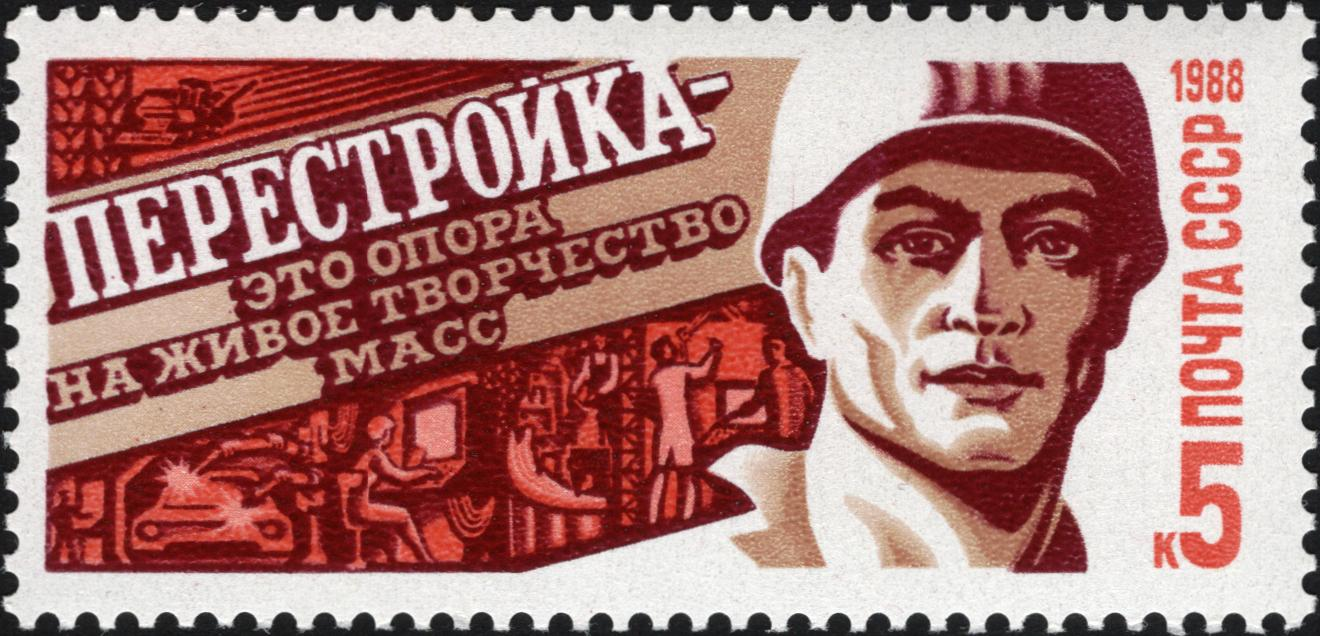
Perestroika postage stamp was issued in May 1988.

The fundamental reform of the entire system including the political changes began in January 1987, when the perestroyka (the restructuring) of the CPSU Central Committee plenum was announced a new state ideology.

=== Voyages in the second part of 1987. ===
June 1987. The ship Sarny was loaded in a Black Sea Ukrainian port and part of crew had to be changed before sailing. The staff captain and staff third officer V.F. Peretyatko had to be changed also. They all time went at sea or for vacation together as they were married two sisters of one family. New third deck officer joined the ship on the 13 of June, and the captain A. Yemeliyanov joined the ship at the same time about. Sarny sailed from Black Sea port to Haiphong port in Vietnam. It was the last trip of old captain A. Yemeliyanov before his pension period. It was the first voyage of the third officer in the ranck third deck officer. Previous ship of the third officer was cargo ship Toyvo Antikaynen. So, the captain A. Yemeliyanov and third deck officer joined the ship Sarny for one voyage only to substitute the staff captain and staff third deck officer.

July, 1987. The general cargo ship Sarny arrived in Haiphong port for discharge.

After discharge the ship run to Saigon river and was moored at the berth of Ho Chi Minh port on Saigon river, Vietnam, for loading. During the loading part of crew visited the Ho Chi Minh City with excursion program.

Before sailing from Ho Chi Minh port a third deck officer, or he was already second deck officer of other Soviet ship, joined the ship Sarny to pass at home. After sailing from Vietnam with cargo for USSR this deck officer explainer third deck officer of the ship Sarny about some correction parts of the books to update navigation charts and books properly.

The ship Sarny did not call Singapore during this voyage and the crew was not glad as the captain A. Yemeliyanov had not sought the call in Singapore. He wanted to achieve good parameters for this voyage and for this reason was better to take bunker supply in another port. He did not want any problem that can affect adversely his retirement. The call in Singapore could give the crew an extra income as per formula: to by in foreign country and to trade in the USSR.

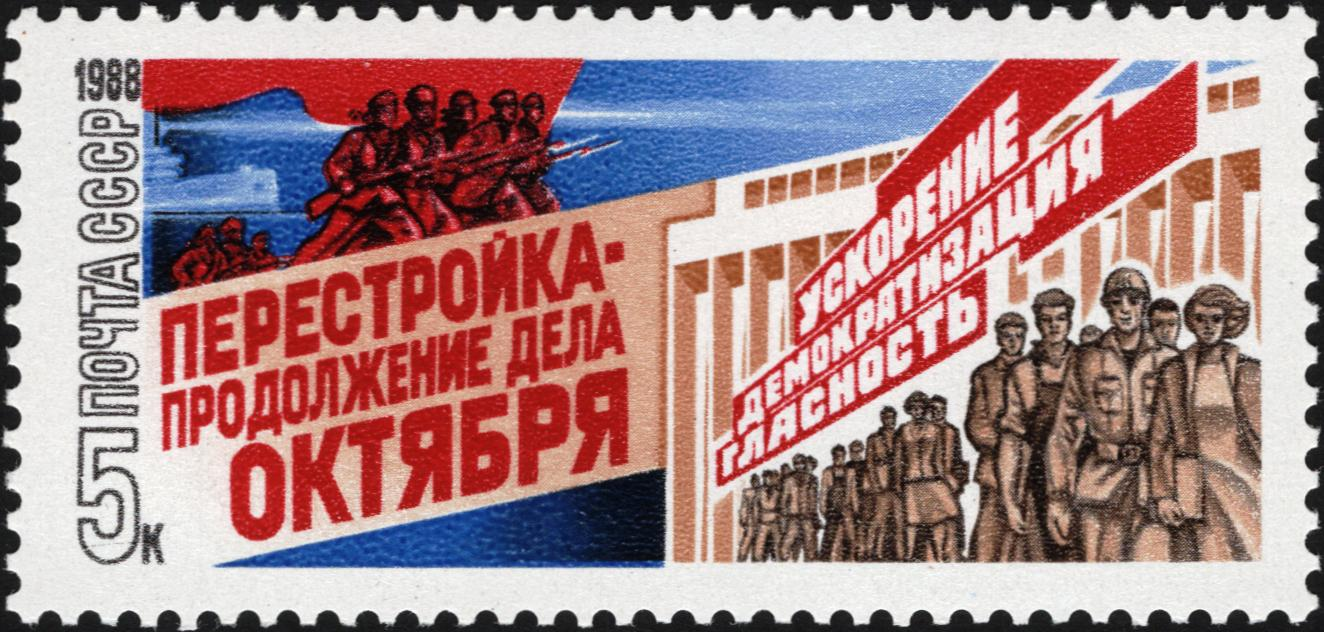
Soviet postal stamp about "perestroyka" was issued in May 1988.

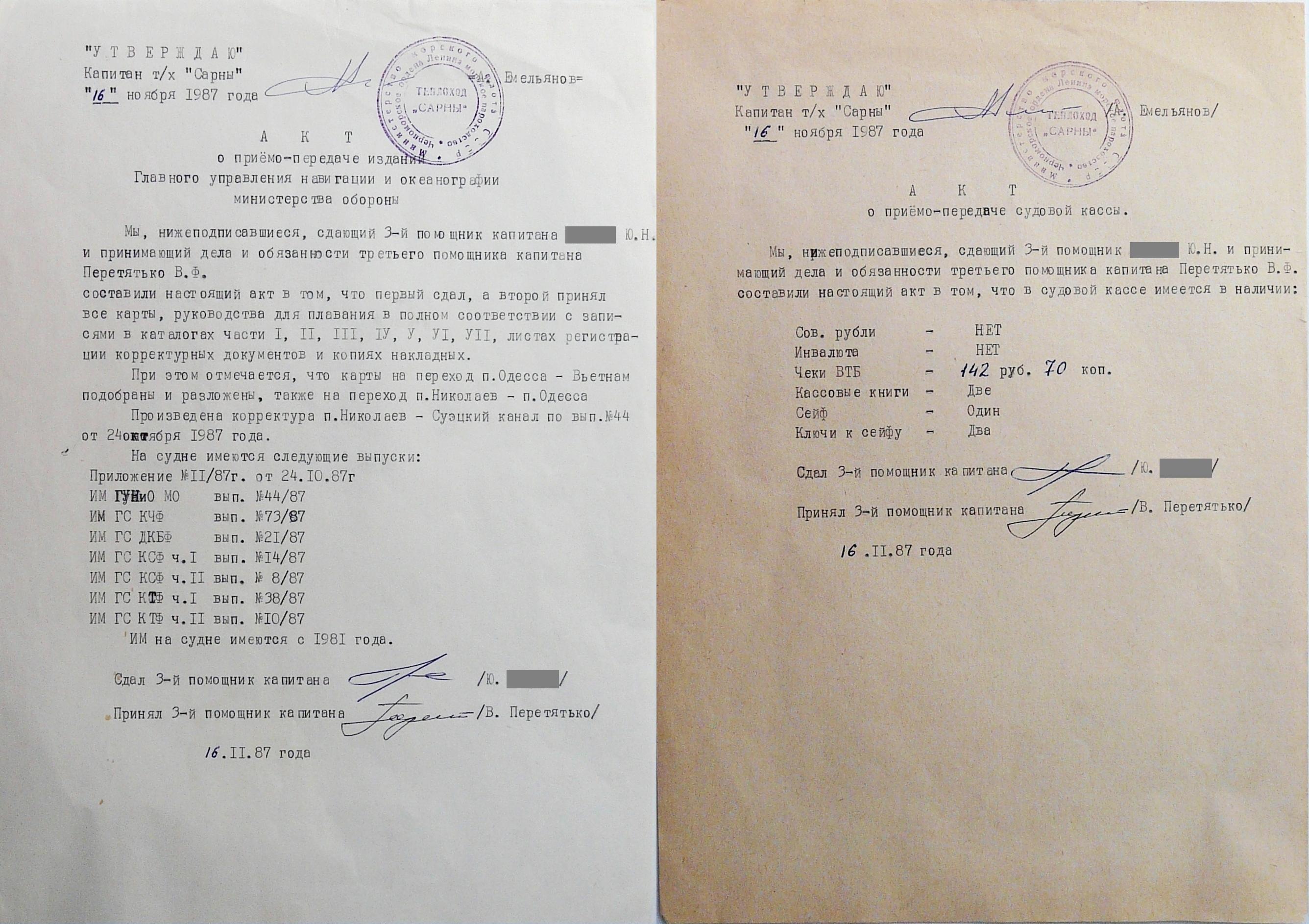
Third deck officers Handover protocols signed in Nikolayev port and dated 16 of November, 1987.

The ship was back from its voyage in Nikolayev sea port in first half of November 1987. During the arrival formalities the customs officers checked the chart room thoroughly. The third deck officer supposed that the check took place because he sometimes discussed Perestroyka among his own family at home only, mostly in front of the TV set, and disagreed with the politics of Mikhail Gorbachev. Anyhow the customs officers though find out and the third deck officer wanted to stop any discussion about politics in future, but somebody managed by his mined and during the next vacation on shore he forgot about the check on board ship and again sometimes discussed about perestroyka among his own family at home only, mostly in front of the TV set.

During the discharge in Nikolayev port the staff captain and staff third deck officer Peretyatko back on the ship and hand over date of third deck officers was on the 16 of November 1987. Next voyage vas planned from Odessa to Vietnam again.

=== Rescue operation in 1989. ===
On December 19, 1989, the Iranian tanker Khark 5 bound for refineries in Northern Europe exploded and caught fire approximately 400 miles north of the Canary Islands. An estimated 452,400 barrels (19 million gallons) of the 1,714,300 barrels (72 million gallons) on board spilled into the sea. The 35 crew members were rescued by the passing Soviet vessel Sarny. Ocean currents carried the abandoned vessel south towards the Canary Islands. The Khark 5 was sinking.

On December 20, 1989, Wednesday, "Los Angeles Times" wrote:

  Iran Tanker Sinking After Blast; Crew OK
  LAS PALMAS, Canary Islands — An Iranian oil tanker exploded and caught fire Tuesday in the Atlantic northwest of the Canary Islands and was reported sinking after its crew was rescued by a Soviet freighter, officials said.
  The 284,632-ton Khark 5 sent out a distress signal at 5 a.m. before its 35-man crew abandoned ship 350 miles from the Spanish archipelago's capital and was picked up by the freighter Sarny, Capt. David Rodriguez of the Las Palmas naval station said.
  Onda Pesquera, the Spanish ship-monitoring radio service based in Barcelona, said the Soviet ship rescued the Iranian tanker's crewmen and is expected to reach Las Palmas on Thursday.

== See also ==
- Cold War
- MS Toyvo Antikaynen
