= Karli Coburger =

- Born: 4 October 1929 (age 97); Neuhaus-Schierschnitz, Thuringia, Germany
- Occupation: Senior Intelligence Officer (Stasi)
- Political party: SED

Karli Coburger (born 4 October 1929) is a former Major general in the East German Ministry for State Security (MfS / "Stasi"). In 1984 he became, as matters turned out, the last head of the service's Central Department for surveillance, fact finding and arrests ("Hauptabteilung / Section VIII").

== Life ==
=== Early years ===
Coburger was born in a very small village roughly 10 km (6 miles) south of Sonneberg in rural Thuringia, a couple of weeks before a stock market crash in New York heralded a decade of economic challenges on both sides of the Atlantic. His father was a porcelain worker. He completed his basic schooling in 1943 and switched to a trade focused secondary school for a basic commercial training. He was halfway through his three-year period here in May 1945 when the war ended, and after the invading armies had repositioned themselves in order to align reality with their previous agreements, the whole of Thuringia ended up in the Soviet occupation zone of what had been Germany. Between 1946 and 1948 Coburger attended the Economics Senior School in Sonneberg, and then, in 1948/49 worked as an informal trainee at the "Plastewerk" factory in the town's Köppelsdorf quarter. The entire zone operated under Soviet Administration till it became a separate German state, the German Democratic Republic formally founded in October 1949. Long before that, in April 1946, the contentious merger between the old Communist Party and the Moderate-left SPD had created the basis for a return to one-party rule in this portion of Germany. Coburger joined the new Socialist Unity Party (Sozialistische Einheitspartei Deutschlands, SED), which had resulted from the merger, in 1949, the year of his twentieth birthday. He studied for a year at the prestigious "Walter Ulbricht" National Administration Academy (Deutsche Akademie für Staats- und Rechtswissenschaft) and then, till 1952, took a job as a commercial assistant, while simultaneously progressing his education through evening classes.

=== The Ministry for State Security ===
In 1952 Coburger joined the Ministry for State Security (MfS / Stasi). He worked initially at the Stasi regional administrative office in Leipzig, before being posted to Berlin in 1953. Here he became lead investigator in "Hauptabteilung IX ("Section IX"). Interrogation techniques applied by Coburger against political detainees included psychological torture such as sleep deprivation and isolation-detention. These methods were used to force victims to make incriminating statements which were then used in the preparation of political show trials. This was part of the elaborate approach taken to prepare the high-profile trial of Elli Barczatis, a former chief secretary in the office of Prime Minister Otto Grotewohl. Barczatis was executed by guillotine on 23 November 1955 (but rehabilitated by a Berlin district court on 28 November 2006)

Between 1957 and 1960 Coburger undertook a correspondence degree course in Crimininalistics – technological aspects of criminology with the Police Academy in Aschersleben. He passed his professional exams in the subject at the Humboldt University of Berlin, albeit only in 1966. That was also the year in which he was promoted, becoming deputy president of the Investigation Department. Ten years later, under a slightly unusual arrangement, he received jointly a doctorate with two other Stasi officers for a "collective dissertation" which bore the title "Enforcement by the Ministry for State Security of Criminal Responsibility on citizens on non-socialist states". The doctorate was awarded by the recently renamed Potsdam Legal Academy (Juristische Hochschule Potsdam).

In 1984 Karli Coburger was promoted to the rank of Major general and appointed to the headship of the service's "Section VIII" (Surveillande, Investigations and Arrests) in succession to Albert Schubert. He held this office till 1989. As the single party dictatorship and its Ministry for State Security dissolved, Coburger was released from his duties in 1990. He became an active participant in Historical revisionist movements that quickly emerged, notably the Society for Legal and Humanitarian Support (GSV / Gesellschaft zur Rechtlichen und Humanitären Unterstützung), formally established in 1993 by former East German politicians and Stasi officers in response to a growing number of legal cases focusing on legal abuses allegedly committed under the old one-party dictatorship that had been East Germany until 1990. In 2003 Coburg was one of a number of former Stasi officers to provide a filmed interview apparently intended to highlight positive aspects from the Stasi record in East Germany, with one of his fellow interviewees, Erich Mielke, characterising the old days with the phrase "A warm heart and clean hands!": the interview failed to gain much coverage or to impress reviewers.

=== Trial and conviction ===
On 14 December 1992 the Public Prosecutor (Generalbundesanwalt) preferred charges against Coburg in respect of his intelligence service activities. In July 2000 he was convicted, in connection with the Robert Havemann case, on charges of complicity in the perversion of justice and liberty: he was given a one-year suspended sentence. Coburg used his trial to reject any responsibility for the actions alleged.
