= Mieczysław Broński =

Polish economist and communist activist

Mieczysław Broński (also known as Warszawski-Broński or Broński-Warszawski, and M. J. Braun; Russian: Мечислав Генрихович Бронский (Варшавский); Mechislav Genrikhovich Bronsky; 1882 – 1 September 1938) was a Russian-Polish communist, Soviet diplomat, economist and academic, and a victim of the Great Purge.

== Early career ==
The Bronski family were industrialists, who owned a cotton factory in Łódź. After leaving school in 1900, he immigrated to Munich to study at the Technical University of Munich, and later at the Ludwig-Maximilians-Universität München, and joined the Polish Progressive movement. In 1902, he joined the Social Democracy of the Kingdom of Poland and Lithuania (SDKPiL), led by Rosa Luxemburg and Leo Jogiches. On the outbreak of the 1905 revolution, in February, he moved to Warsaw, to work first as a propagandist for the SDPKiL, then as a member of the Warsaw city party committee. In 1906, he edited the party newspaper Czerwony Sztandar ("Red Flag"). He was arrested in Lublin in autumn 1906, and held in prison until the end of 1907. After his release, he immigrated to Switzerland, and joined the Social Democratic Party of Switzerland. When the SDKPiL split in 1911, he joined the 'rozlamovist' faction, led by Jacob Hanecki and Karl Radek.

== Bolshevik career ==
Bronski was a founder of the Zimmerwald anti-war movement, and a Polish delegate to the second Zimmerwald conference in Kienthal in April 1916. By then, he had become part of the Zimmerwald left, and an ally of the Bolshevik leader, Vladimir Lenin. By 1916, they were near neighbours in Zurich: it was Bronski who brought Lenin news in 1917 that the February Revolution had broken out in Russia. In June 1917, he reached Petrograd, where he joined the Bolsheviks, worked in the party's Agitprop department, and edited the Polish-language newspaper Trybuna. After the Bolshevik Revolution, in November 1917, he worked for the state bank, and April supervised the first conference for prisoners of war (such as Bela Kun and Josip Broz Tito) who had converted to Bolshevism. From March 1918 until November 1918 he was the acting People's Commissar of Trade and Industry and until spring 1919, he was Deputy People's Commissar for Trade and Industry. In 1919, he was sent to Germany as an agent of Comintern, and addressed the founding congress the Young Communist International in a beer hall in Berlin in November 1919, and took part in a secret communist conference in Frankfurt and was a member of the Western Europe Secretariat. However he was very critical of Paul Levi's leadership of the Communist Party of Germany during the Kapp Putsch and was then recalled to Moscow.

From 1920 to 1924, he was the Soviet envoy in Austria, but was in Germany during the attempted revolution known as the March Action, but left soon afterwards. In 1924, he returned to Russia and held a senior post in the People's Commissariat for Finance. From 1927 to 1937, he was Professor of Political Economy at Moscow University. From 1928, he was a full member of the Communist Academy and was also a senior researcher at the Institute of Economy at the Academy of Sciences of the Soviet Union.

== Arrest and death ==
Bronski was arrested on 9 September 1937, and accused of being part of a terrorist plot, during a mass round-up of Polish nationals living in the Soviet Union. The former French communist, Boris Souvarine, thought it inevitable that he would be a victim of the purges because "a man like Bronski – cultured, polite, irreproachable – could not help but attract the murderous animadversion of the Despot." He was shot and buried at Kommunarka, near Moscow, on 1 September 1938. He was formally rehabilitated on 21 July 1956.

== Family ==
Bronski had a daughter, Wanda Brońska-Pampuch (1911–1972), from his first marriage. Brought up in Switzerland and Germany, she joined her father in the Soviet Union in 1931. She was arrested in 1938 and sentenced to eight years in the Gulag, in Kolyma. She was released in 1946, moved to Germany in 1952, and became known as a writer.

In Vienna, in 1920, he married Susanne Leonhard, a German communist and the mother of Wolfgang Leonhard, later renowned as a historian and critic of communism. She was arrested in 1936, and survived twelve years in the Gulag, in Vorkuta. With the help of her son, she was released in 1948, moving to East Berlin. A few months later, in the spring of 1949, mother and son decided to leave Stalinist East Germany for good, relocating to West Germany. Upon arrival, the U.S. Army's Counter Intelligence Corps interned her, but refusing to work as a spy, she was released in 1950. Susanne Leonhard died in Stuttgart in 1984.

Adopted son: Wolfgang Leonhard (1921–2014), a German historian. After his adoptive father’s arrest, he was placed in an orphanage. From 1945 to 1949, he participated in building the local administration in the Soviet occupation zone of Germany. In 1949, he emigrated first to Yugoslavia and then to West Germany.

== Works ==
- Zur Geschichte und Tätigkeit der Sowjets in Rußland : aus dem Volkskalender der Petrograder Sowjets 1919. (On the History and Activities of the Soviets in Russia: From the People's Calendar of the Petrograd Soviets, 1919.) "M. J. Braun", Berlin: Rote Fahne, 1919.
- Die Lehren des Kapp-Putsches. (The Lessons of the Kapp Putsch.) "M. J. Braun", Leipzig: Franke, 1920.
