= Stefan Doernberg =

German diplomat (1924–2010)

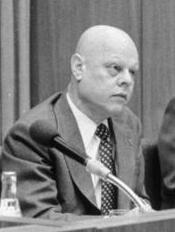
- Doernberg in 1980

Ambassador of the German Democratic Republic to Finland
- In office 1981–1987
- Preceded by: Joachim Mitdank
- Succeeded by: Rolf Böttcher

Personal details
- Born: June 21, 1924 Berlin, Weimar Republic
- Died: May 3, 2010 (aged 85) Berlin, Germany
- Party: The Left (2007–); Party of Democratic Socialism (1989–2007); Socialist Unity Party of Germany (1946–1989)
- Education: Moscow State University
- Awards: Patriotic Order of Merit, in gold (1984); Patriotic Order of Merit, in silver (1966); Patriotic Order of Merit, in bronze (1964)
- Military Service
- Allegiance: Soviet Union
- Branch: Red Army
- Service years: 1941–1945
- Rank: Lieutenant
- Unit: 8th Guards Army
- Conflicts: Second World War; Eastern Front; Operation Barbarossa
- Awards: Jubilee Medal "Forty Years of Victory in the Great Patriotic War 1941–1945" (1985)

Stefan Doernberg (21 June 1924 – 3 May 2010) was a German writer, secondary school teacher and Researcher of Contemporary History as well as the final director of International Relations Institute for the Academy of the State and Jurisprudence (ASR in German) for the German Democratic Republic (East Germany). He was the East German ambassador to Finland from 1981 to 1987.

== Early life ==
Doernberg was born the son of an official of the KPD. In 1935, he and his parents emigrated to the Soviet Union where he attended the Karl Liebknecht School. In 1939, he joined the KJVD and received his Abitur in Moscow.

On the day of Operation Barbarossa, he joined the Red Army. He was temporarily interned in a work camp in the Urals because of his German origins but he returned from his stay there to the front after schooling in the Comintern. As a Lieutenant in the 8th Guards Army he participated in the battles in Ukraine, Poland, and Berlin.
