= MS Toyvo Antikaynen =

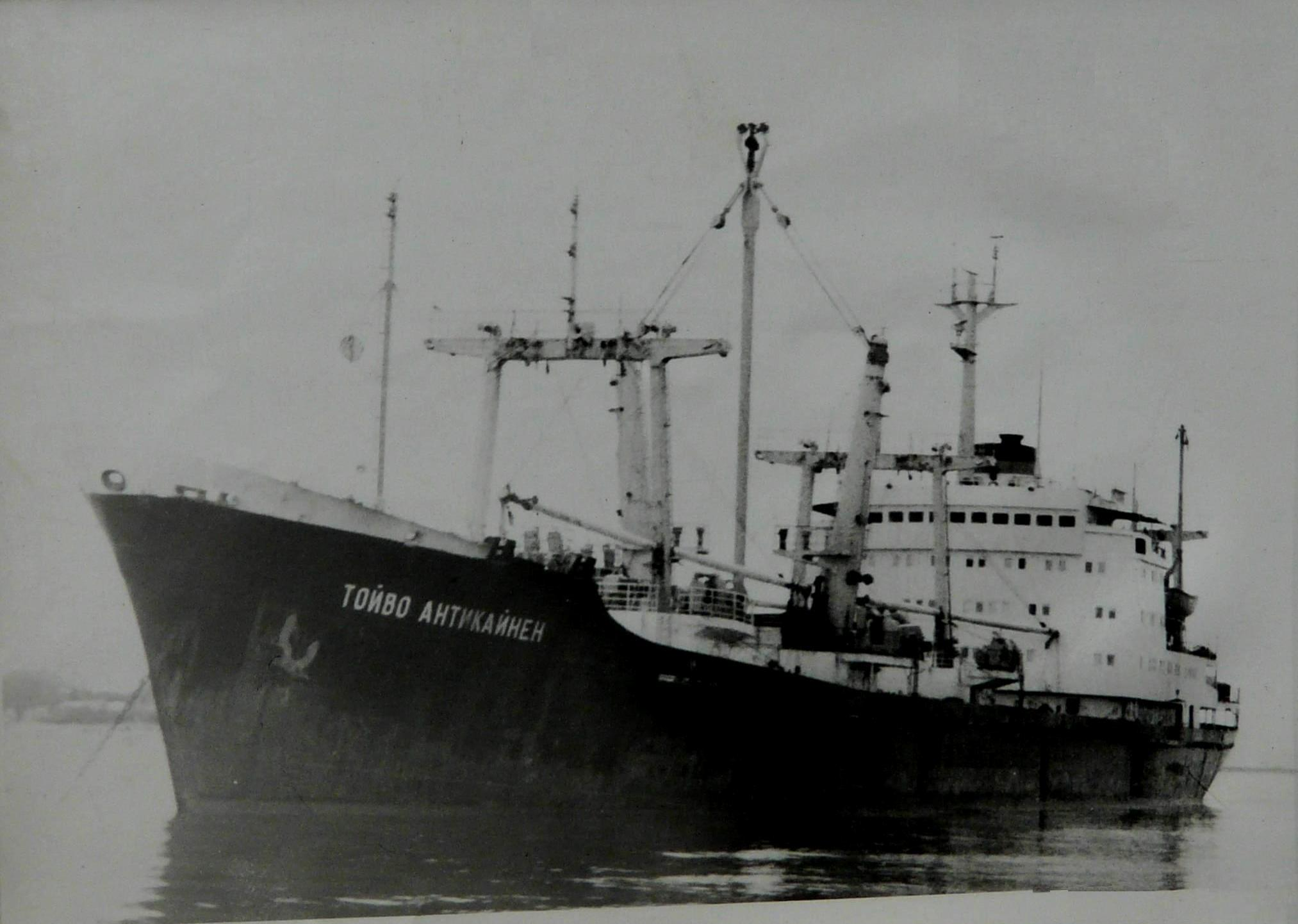
- Soviet ship Toyvo Antikaynen at anchor. Photo dated between 1974 and February 1986.

History
- Name: Toyvo Antikaynen; (Russian: Тойво Антикайнен)
- Namesake: Toivo Antikainen
- Owner: 25 April 1970–1999: Black Sea Shipping Company, (Soviet Union) USSR
- Operator: 25 April 1970–1999: Black Sea Shipping Company, (Soviet Union) USSR
- Port of registry: 25 April 1970–1999: Odessa, (Soviet Union) USSR
- Builder: Gdansk Shipyard in honor of Lenin, Poland.
- Identification: Call sign: UWQZ; IMO number: 7012727
- Fate: Scrapped in 1999 at Calcutta

General characteristics
- Class & type: Kommunist-class cargo ship
- Type: freighter, tweendecker
- Tonnage: 12,636 gross register tonnage
- Length: overall 507.0 ft (154.54 m); between perpendiculars 478.7 ft (145.92 m)
- Beam: 67.7 ft (20.62 m)
- Draught: 29.5 ft (8.98 m)
- Propulsion: Sulzer 6 cylinder diesel, 9600 HP. Single screw propeller.
- Speed: 15.2 knots
- Capacity: 5 cargo holds.; GRT 9,883 register tons.
- Crew: 34 persons about in 1985-1986

Toyvo Antikaynen (Russian: Тойво Антикайнен) was a merchant ship of Black Sea Shipping Company (Soviet Union), tweendecker type general cargo ship, project B401. This ship is one of the Kommunist-class cargo ships. The ship was named in honor of the Finnish communist leader and the Red Army officer Toivo Antikainen.

Only two ships of Kommunist-class cargo ships had additional figure in the built number (shipyard number). These were Djuzeppe di Vittorio (number B40/101 - B40/91) and Toyvo Antikaynen (number B40/102 - B40/92). Can be it was due to this two ships were built by another shipyard in Poland, and other Kommunist class cargo ships.

== Final years ==
The ship Toyvo Antikaynen was scrapped in 1999 at Calcutta, India. She was one of the last scrapped Kommunist-class ships.

== Gallery ==
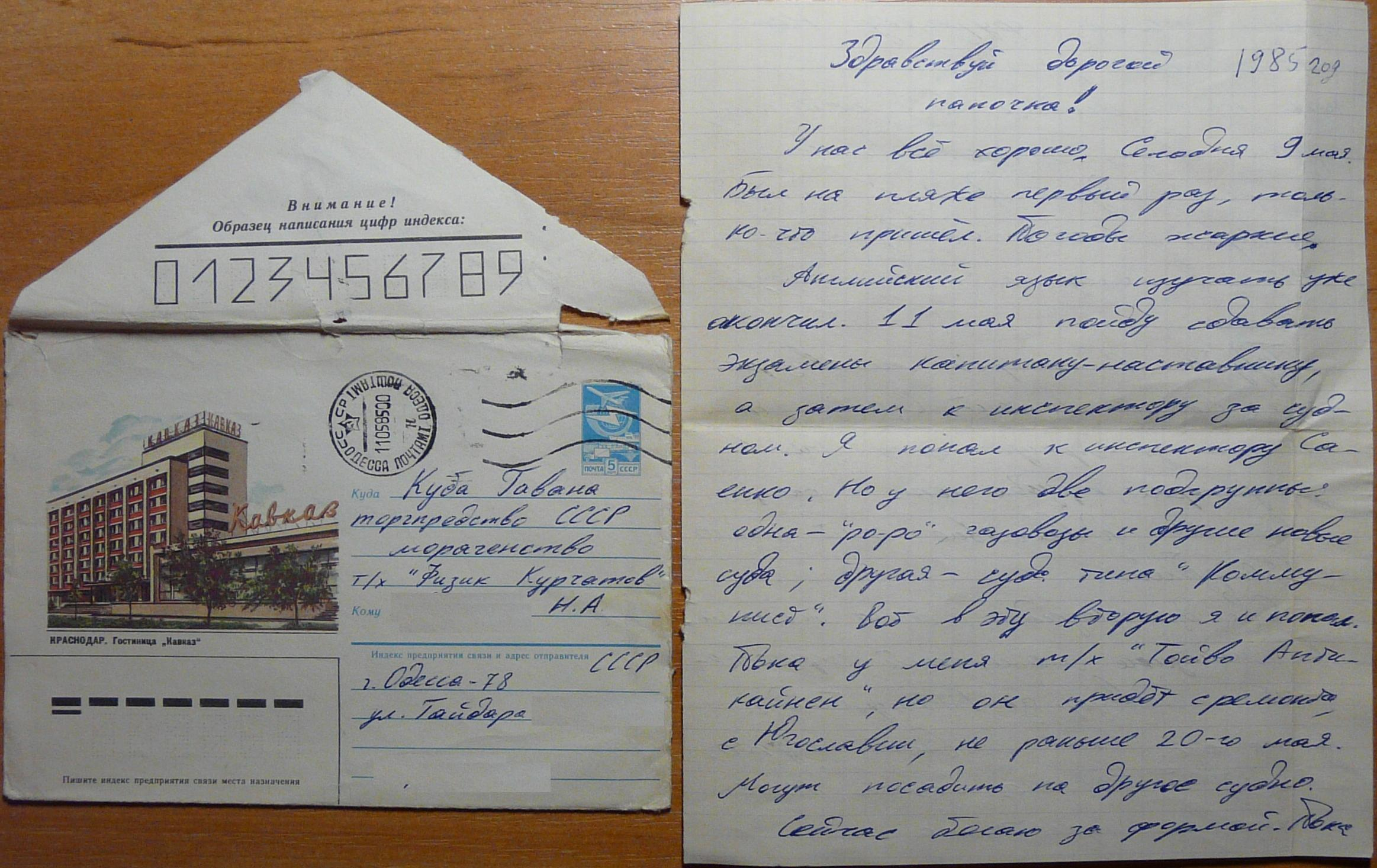
The part of the letter from the junior officer to his father when the father was in Cuba, on board of the ship Fizik Kurchatov. The letter dated 09 of May 1985. The text of this letter informs that the son was planned as the junior officer for the ship Toyvo Antikaynen and awaiting the ship's arrival in the USSR from Yugoslavia.

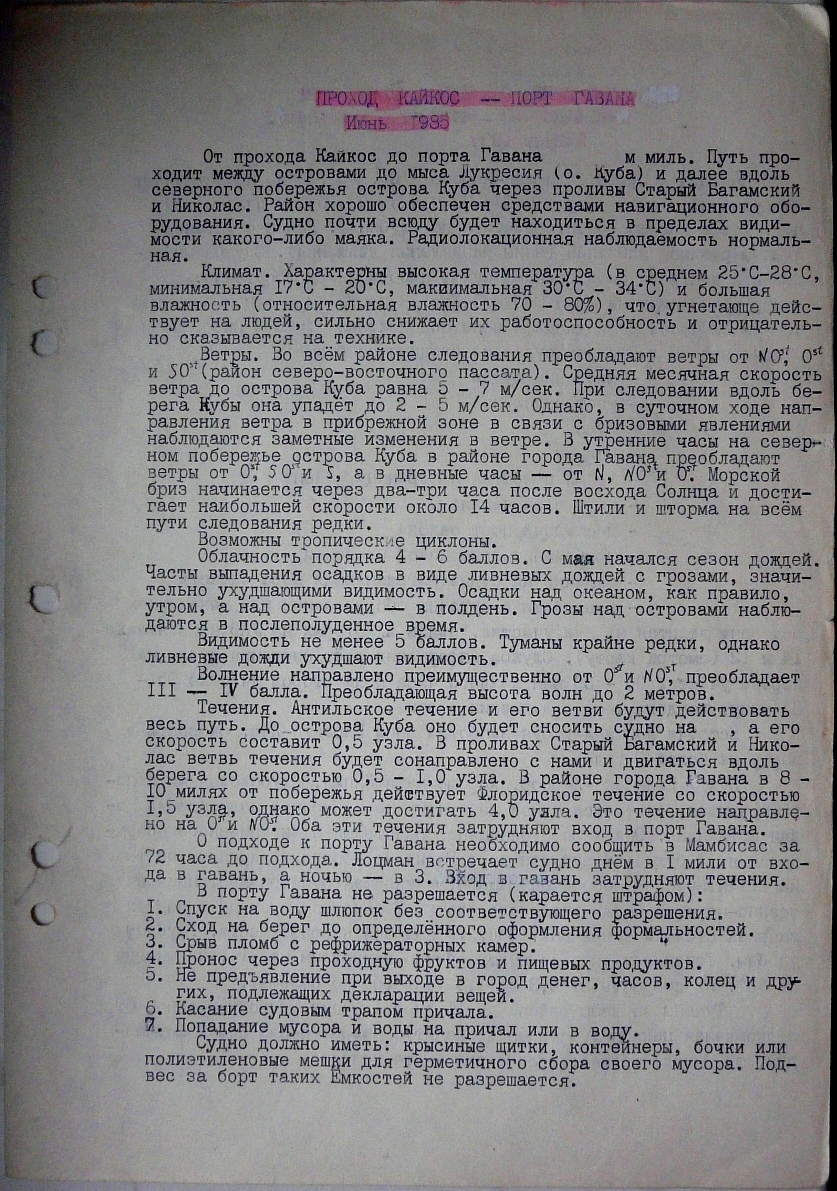
Appraisal, i.e. gathering all information relevant to the contemplated voyage or sea passage of Caicos Strait in June 1985, on Russian language. Photo from Navigator's Notebook of Junior Officer of mv Toyvo Antikaynen.

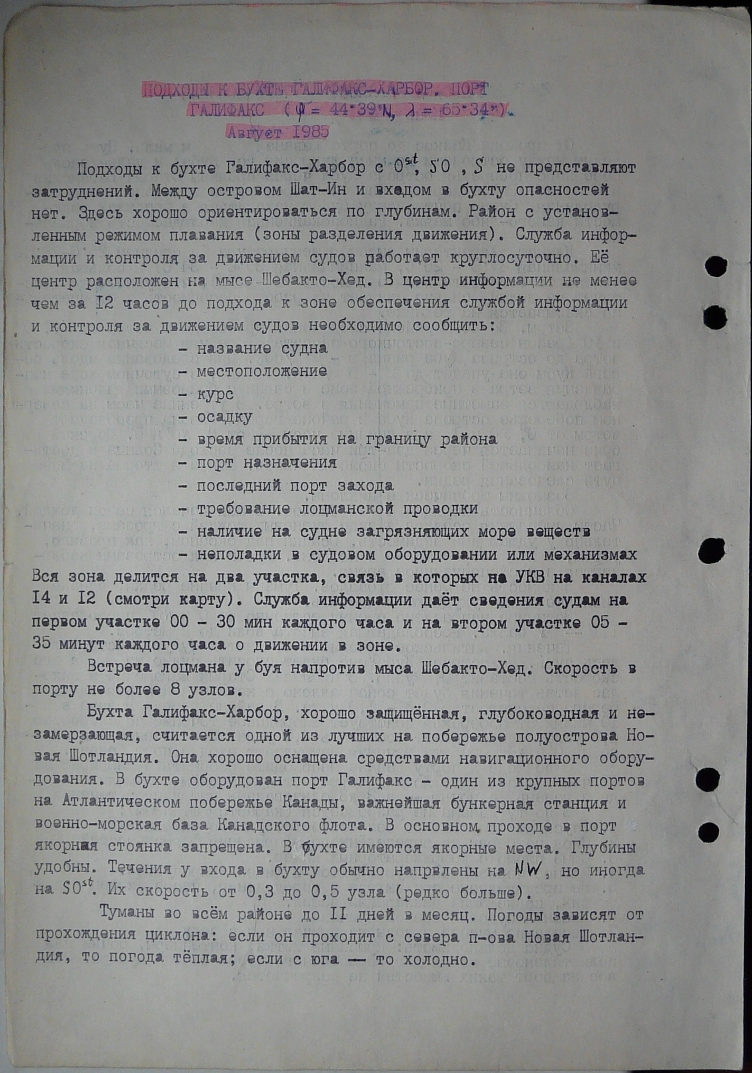
Appraisal, i.e. gathering all information relevant to the contemplated voyage or sea passage of Halifax Approaches and Weather in August 1985. Photo from Navigator's Notebook of junior officer from mv Toyvo Antikaynen, on Russian Language. It is means that mv Toyvo Antikaynen arrived in Halifax port in August 1985.

== See also ==
- Cold War
- SS Nezhin
- SS Karaganda
- SS Metallurg Anosov
- SS Fizik Kurchatov
- MS Sarny
