= Tagansky =

Tagansky (masculine), Taganskaya (feminine), or Taganskoye (neuter) may refer to:

- Tagansky District, a district of Moscow
- Taganskaya Street in Moscow
- Taganskaya (Koltsevaya line), a Moscow Metro station on the Koltsevaya line
- Taganskaya (Tagansko-Krasnopresnenskaya line), a Moscow Metro station on the Tagansko-Krasnopresnenskaya line
- Tagansky Protected Command Point, a bunker underneath Moscow

== See also ==
- Taganka (disambiguation)
