= Wolfgang Leonhard =

German political author and historian

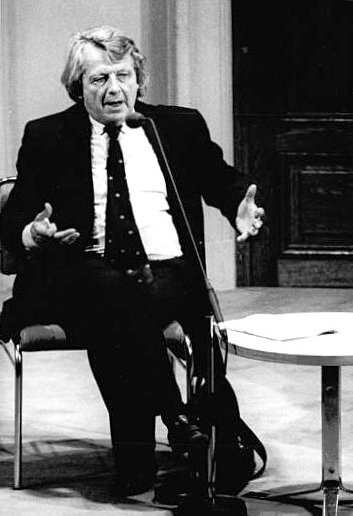
- Wolfgang Leonhard (1990)
- Born: Wladimir Leonhard; 16 April 1921; Vienna, Austria
- Died: 17 August 2014 (aged 93); Daun, Rhineland-Palatinate, Germany
- Occupations: Historian, lecturer, writer
- Political party: SED (later a party dissident)
- Spouse: Elke Leonhard-Schmid (1974)

Wolfgang Leonhard (16 April 1921 – 17 August 2014) was a German political author and historian of the Soviet Union, the German Democratic Republic and Communism. A German Communist whose family had fled Hitler's Germany and who was educated in the Soviet Union, after World War II Leonhard became one of the founders and leaders of the German Democratic Republic until he became disillusioned and fled in 1949, first defecting to Yugoslavia and then moving to West Germany in 1950 and later to the United Kingdom. In 1956 he moved to the United States, where he was a popular and influential professor at Yale University from 1966 to 1987, teaching the history of communism and the Soviet Union, topics about which he wrote several books. After the Cold War ended, he returned to Germany.

== Biography ==
=== Early life ===
Wolfgang (originally Vladimir) Leonhard was born in Vienna as the son of writers Susanne Köhler and Rudolf Leonhard. His mother was an active Communist and had been a close friend of Rosa Luxemburg and Karl Liebknecht, the German Communist leaders. At the time of Wolfgang's birth, however, his parents were already divorced, and his mother had married the Soviet ambassador to Austria, Mieczysław Broński, under Soviet law. Susanne Leonhard worked as head of the press department of the embassy.

From 1931, Susanne Leonhard and her son lived in the "Artists' Colony" in Wilmersdorf, Berlin, the home of many left-wing intellectuals. Wolfgang attended Karl Marx Grammar School and joined the youth organization of the Communist Party of Germany, the "Young Pioneers". As things grew more dangerous in Berlin, he was sent to Landschulheim Herrlingen, a private boarding school, in 1932.

After Adolf Hitler was appointed Chancellor of Germany in 1933, Susanne Leonhard sent her son to a boarding school in Sweden. She visited him there in 1935, but during her visit, her leftist group in Germany was exposed and she could not go back to Germany. She was not allowed to stay in Sweden either, so she had her 13-year-old son choose between exile in England and exile in the Soviet Union. He chose the Soviet Union.

=== In the Soviet Union ===
From 1935 to 1937, Leonhard attended Karl Liebknecht School in Moscow, a school for the children of German and Austrian Communists. A special children's home (Children's Home No. 6) had been established in Moscow for Austrian and German orphans of fascism; Leonhard lived there from September 1936 to August 1939, when it was closed a week after the Molotov–Ribbentrop Pact, following months of pressure after a number of residents were arrested in the so-called Hitler Youth Conspiracy. Afterwards Leonhard enrolled as a student at the Moscow Institute for Foreign Languages.

1936 was the beginning of The Great Purge, a period of arbitrary arrests and trials in the Soviet Union. Leonhard's mother was arrested by the secret police, NKVD, in October 1936, and had to do forced labour for the next 12 years, mainly in the camp of Vorkuta (see Gulag). With the help of Wilhelm Pieck, later President of the German Democratic Republic, Leonhard achieved her release in 1948.

After the German attack on the Soviet Union on 22 June 1941 the Germans there were deported to certain areas mainly in the southeast, and Leonhard had to go to Karaganda but was able to continue his teacher training. A year later he was sent to the International Lenin School, the Comintern school that had moved from Moscow to Ufa during the invasion. Some of his teachers and fellow students there were to be found in leading positions after 1945, such as Paul Wandel, Heinz Hoffmann and Markus Wolf in the GDR and Jakub Berman in Poland. The eldest son of Yugoslav partisan leader Josip Broz Tito, Zarko, also attended the Comintern school at the time.

Leonhard's final exams at the Comintern school in the summer of 1943 coincided with the dissolution of the Comintern and the closure of the school. He was now employed by the "National Committee for a Free Germany", an organization of prisoners of war and expatriates. First he worked for its weekly newspaper "Free Germany", whose editor-in-chief was Rudolf Herrnstadt.

Anton Ackermann, one of the leaders of the "National Committee", made Leonhard an announcer at the Committee's radio station, "Radio Free Germany".

=== In East Germany ===
Leonhard was chosen as a member of one of the two groups of German communists who were the first to return to Germany as soon as the Red Army had reached German territory. Each group consisted of ten members. Leonhard was in the Ulbricht Group, led by Walter Ulbricht, later (from 1950 to 1971) Secretary-General of the Socialist Unity Party of Germany (Sozialistische Einheitspartei Deutschlands, or SED). Their task was to organize the administration of the Soviet occupation zone. "It has to look democratic, but we must have control of everything," Ulbricht told them. Therefore, deputy mayors and chief constables as well as heads of personnel departments and departments of education had to be Communists. Other administrative jobs could go to people of a different political persuasion in order to gain support from as many groups as possible.

In the following years Leonhard continued to work for the Central Committee of the Communist Party, which became the Socialist Unity Party of Germany (SED) in April 1946 after the Social Democratic Party in the Soviet zone had been forced to merge with it. Among other things he was involved in journalism and political instruction. In September 1947 he became a lecturer in the history department of the party's college Karl Marx.

=== Escape to Yugoslavia ===
Like Anton Ackermann, Wolfgang Leonhard thought that the creation of a German socialist state would follow a more democratic pattern than the developments he had experienced in the Soviet Union. His first criticism and doubts about Stalinism came as early as in 1936, when his mother was arrested, but his basic belief in Marxism–Leninism persisted for years.

On April 16, 1948, Walter Ulbricht gave a five-hour speech at the SED college outlining the plans for the Soviet-occupied sector. He identified the SED as the future governing power and asserted that people should seek to reach their own goals through the state apparatus. This speech convinced Leonhard that Germany was not going to follow a different path to socialism, but would replicate the Soviet system. In March 1949, he fled to Yugoslavia via Czechoslovakia. Yugoslavia had been expelled from Cominform, the successor organization of Comintern under Soviet leadership, and was establishing its own type of socialism.

When asked in January 1996 what would have happened to him had the East German government caught him during his escape to Yugoslavia, Leonhard said, "Oh, execution. Because I was a high ranking official. I was the first high ranking official escaping from East Germany who was trained in Moscow, in the Soviet Union."

In Yugoslavia, Leonhard was in charge of the German programmes of Belgrade Radio.

=== In the West ===
From Yugoslavia, Wolfgang Leonhard then went on to West Germany, where he worked as a political writer and as an expert on Eastern Europe. He later said that it was then that he chose the focus of his life's work: "In West Germany I looked around and I decided my life I will devote to one question only, the Soviet Union.... My only aim was from 1950 onwards to study what happened and will happen in the Soviet Union and the Soviet bloc."

After his postgraduate studies at St Antony's College, Oxford University, from 1956 to 1958, and his work as a senior research fellow at the Institute for Russian Studies of Columbia University, in New York City, in 1963 and 1964, Leonhard became a professor at Yale University.

Professor Leonhard taught Soviet history and the history of international Communism at Yale from 1966 to 1987. His popular lecture course on the history of the Soviet Union was one of the largest courses there in the 1980s, and was commonly referred to as "Wolfgang." One of Leonhard's students at Yale was the future president George W. Bush, who wrote that Leonhard's History of the Soviet Union was "one of my most memorable courses," and "an introduction to the struggle between tyranny and freedom, a battle that has held my attention for the rest of my life."

Leonhard was a visiting professor at the universities of Michigan at Ann Arbor in the United States; and Mainz, Trier, Kiel, Chemnitz, and Erfurt in both West Germany and the former East Germany. He delivered lectures in places including Tokyo, Bombay, Accra, Ghana, and Colombo, Sri Lanka.

He was the author of numerous books and essays on Eastern Europe and Communism. His 1955 memoir, Die Revolution entlässt ihre Kinder ("Child of the Revolution"), was translated into many languages and was an international bestseller.

In 1987, when West German President Richard von Weizsäcker visited the Soviet Union, Leonhard was able to return to that country for the first time since 1945. Afterwards he paid regular visits to Russia and other countries in Eastern Europe. He has also had meetings with a number of acquaintances from his life in Russia and East Germany. Several times he observed elections in Russia, Belarus, and Ukraine for the Organization for Security and Co-operation in Europe (OECD).

Wolfgang Leonhard's wife, Elke Leonhard, was an SPD member of the Bundestag, the German parliament, from 1990 to 2005.

=== Death ===
Leonhard died on August 17, 2014, at a hospital in Daun, Germany, from a long illness at the age of 93.

== Awards and decorations ==
- Phi Beta Kappa from Yale University (1982)
- Merit Cross 1st Class of the Federal Republic of Germany (Verdienstkreuz 1. Klasse) (1987)
- Honorary doctorate from the Chemnitz University of Technology (1998)
- Cross of Honour for Science and Art, 1st Class (Austria, 2002)
- European Science Culture Award (2004)

== Published works ==
(partial list)

- Die Revolution entlässt ihre Kinder. Köln (Kiepenheuer & Witsch) 1955; in Engl.: Child of the revolution. Transl. by C. M. Woodhouse. London (Collins) 1957
- Die Dreispaltung des Marxismus - Ursprung und Entwicklung des Sowjetmarxismus, Maoismus und Reformkommunismus (1970)
- The Kremlin and the West (1988)
- Betrayal: The Hitler-Stalin Pact of 1939 (1989)

== See also ==
- List of Eastern Bloc defectors
