= Union of Manual and Intellectual Workers =

The Union of Manual and Intellectual Workers (Union der Hand- und Kopfarbeiter) was a German trade union that was politically close to the Communist Party of Germany (KPD). It was formed in the period after the German Revolution of 1918–1919 and existed to the end of 1925.

== History ==
The Union was formed in September 1921 by the merger of three left-wing trade unions that had not joined the Allgemeiner Deutscher Gewerkschaftsbund (ADGB), which they, like other radicalized workers in the General Workers Union of Germany (Allgemeine Arbeiter-Union Deutschlands) and the Free Workers' Union of Germany had felt was reformist. The three unions were the Gelsenkirchen Free Workers' Union, the Berlin-based Association of Manual and Intellectual Workers and the Braunschweig-based Farmworkers' Association (Landarbeiterverband). Gustav Sobottka was one of the founding members of the union. At the national level, the newly merged Union became part of the Profintern. The Union's was mainly focused in the Ruhr region and bordering areas, as well as in the Berlin area. The dominant sectors were mining and metalworking. In the Ruhr region, about half the KPD members who were members of various trade unions were also members of the Union.

At its inception, the Union had roughly 90,000 members. Between 1922 and 1923, it grew to over 100,000 members. Although losing members by the end of 1923, it still had the strongest voice in Ruhr region mining council elections in 1924. The Union's membership contained different sorts of radicals, many of whom were undisciplined, and caused problems for the more disciplined KPD. The KPD, seeking to advance the class struggle, wanted to establish revolutionary unions to displace the Christian and liberal unions' position of power in the workplace. The KPD tried to organize party factions within the Union, but with little success.

After the Fifth Congress of the Comintern in 1924, communists were urged to join the free unions, but the more radical Union instead urged workers to leave those unions, further straining relations with the KPD until the KPD ended it completely. Members withdrew and joined the ADGB and by the end of 1924, the Union was just over 20,000 strong; the following August, just 8,000 and faded from activity.

== Bibliography ==
- Eva Cornelia Schöck, Arbeitslosigkeit und Rationalisierung. Die Lage der Arbeiter und die kommunistische Gewerkschaftspolitik 1920-28. Frankfurt am Main/New York 1977 ISBN 3-593-32537-3, v.a. pp. 88–113 and p. 249 (in German)
- Hermann Weber, Die Wandlung des deutschen Kommunismus. Die Stalinisierung der KPD in der Weimarer Republik. Band 1. Frankfurt/Main 1969, v.a. S. 68f, p. 98f and p. 168 (in German)
