= Toivo Antikainen =

Finnish politician (born 1898)

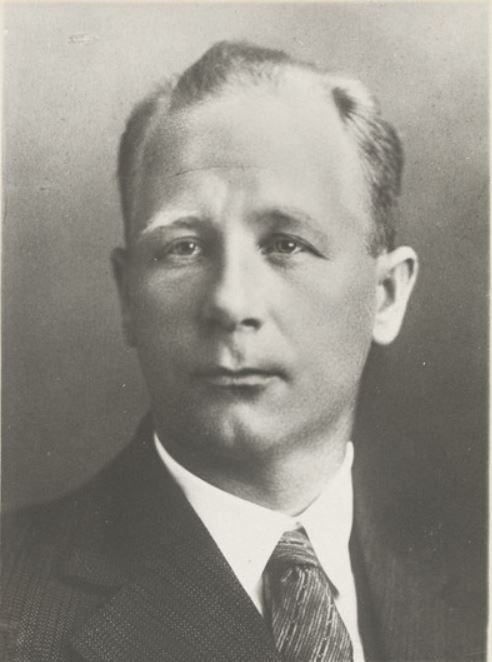
- Toivo Antikainen in 1930
- Born: 8 June 1898; Helsinki, Grand Duchy of Finland, Russian Empire
- Died: 4 October 1941 (aged 43); Arkhangelsk, Soviet Union
- Military career
- Allegiance: Soviet Union
- Service years: 1918–1924
- Conflicts: Finnish Civil War; Russian Civil War

Toivo Antikainen (Russian: То́йво А́нтикайнен, 8 June 1898 – 4 October 1941) was a Finnish-born communist and a military officer of the Soviet Red Army. He was one of the founders and leaders of the exiled Communist Party of Finland. Antikainen died in suspicious circumstances in the Soviet Union in 1941.

== Biography ==
=== Early years ===
Toivo Antikainen was born to a working-class family in Helsinki. His parents were trade unionists and Toivo joined the Social Democratic youth organization at the age of 8. Antikainen went to school for six years and started working as he was 12. In the late 1910s, Antikainen had several posts in the Social Democratic organizations. As the Finnish Civil War broke out in January 1918, Antikainen served in the Red administration, but did not fight in the Red Guards.

=== The Russian Civil War ===
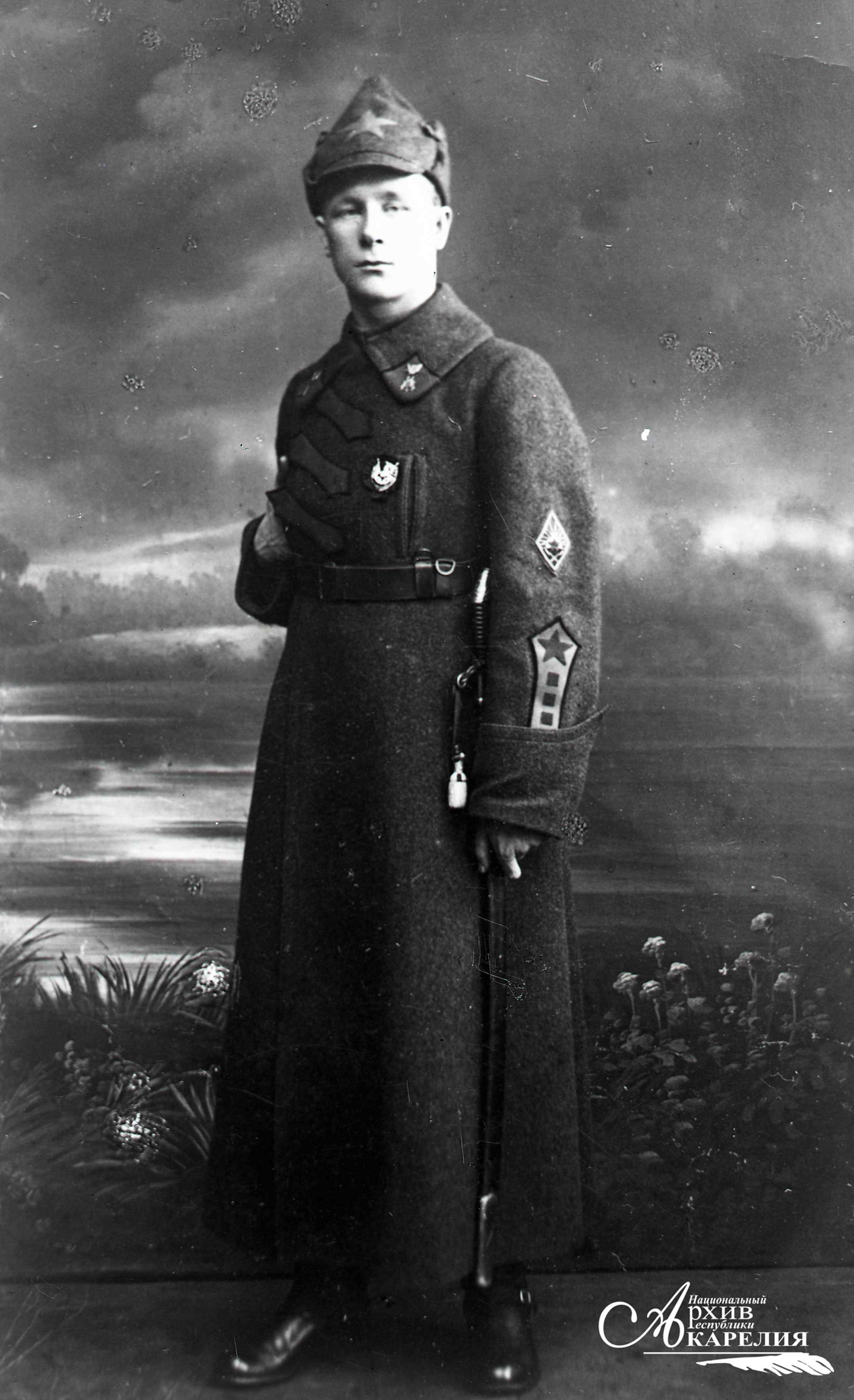
Antikainen in a Red Army officer uniform, 1922

As the Reds were losing the war, Antikainen fled to the Soviet Russia in late April 1918. He was one of the founders of the exile Communist Party of Finland, established in Moscow in August 1918. Antikainen took a course in the Petrograd Red Officer School and graduated in the spring of 1919. In the Russian Civil War, he fought against the Finnish Whites in East Karelia. In January 1922, Antikainen commanded a battalion in the Battle of Kimasozero, where a Red Army unit composed of Finnish Reds beat the Whites and pushed them back to Finland. The 1937 film Za Sovetskuyu Rodinu (For the Soviet Motherland) is based on the events. Antikainen is played by Oleg Zhakov. He also took part in the investigation of the Kuusinen Club Incident in 1920, and the suppression of the Kronstadt rebellion a year later. After working as a lecturer in the Red Officer School, Antikainen was transferred to the Communist International in 1924. Since 1926 he gave lectures at the International Lenin School in Moscow.

=== Trial in Finland ===
During the late 1920s and early 1930s, Antikainen had several underground assignments in Finland for the illegal Communist Party. In November 1934, the police captured him in Helsinki from the house of the communist leader Yrjö Leino. He was now accused of a preparation of a high treason in a trial that started in February 1935. Antikainen was also charged of the murder of the Finnish officer Antti Marjoniemi who was killed in the 1922 Battle of Kimasozero. According to the prosecution, Marjoniemi was taken as a prisoner and then shot by Antikainen. The right-wing press also claimed that Antikainen had tortured him and conducted some kind of cannibalism after Marjoniemi had been roasted in the camp fire, but these accusations were not based in reality.

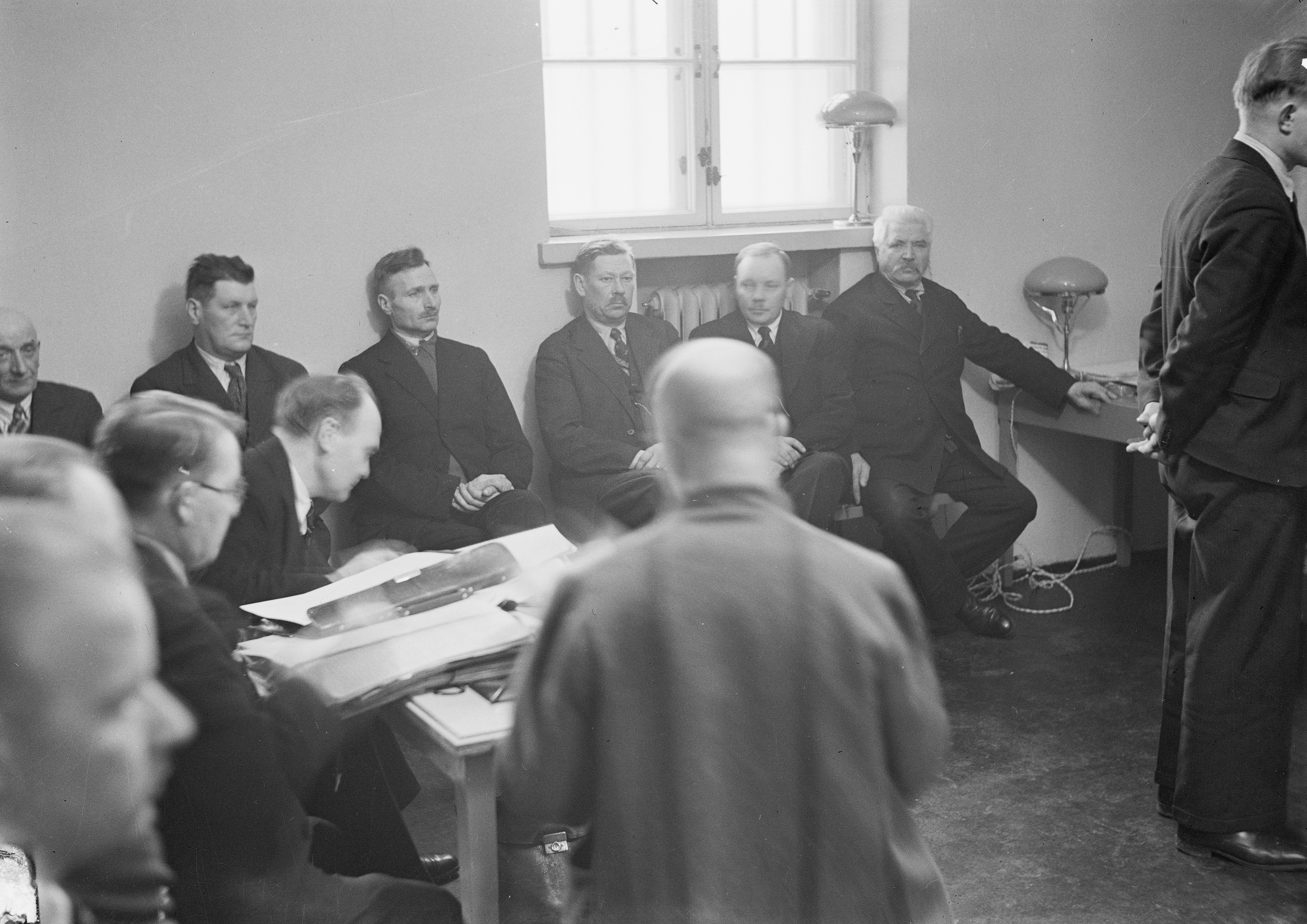
Trial of Antikainen in 1936

The trial caught worldwide attention as Antikainen and the Bulgarian communist Georgi Dimitrov, arrested in Berlin for alleged complicity in the Reichstag fire, were supported by an international solidarity campaign. The International Red Aid was also involved acquiring legal aid and bringing independent foreign experts to follow the trial. One of the observers was Diana Hubback, the daughter of the British feminist Eva Marian Hubback. Antikainen was even noticed by the Finnish American volunteers of the Spanish Civil War, a machine gun company of the Abraham Lincoln brigade was named after him. Due to the Antikainen case, the Finnish right-wing was eager to bring back the capital punishment, but this was strongly rejected by the liberals who collected a petition of more than 120,000 names against the intention. Finally, Antikainen was sentenced for 8 years of a preparation of a high treason. In May 1937, the Supreme Court sentenced him a life in prison of the murder of Antti Marjoniemi, although there was only circumstantial evidence. In 1974, the Finnish-born KGB officer Toivo Vähä published his memoirs claiming that he had killed Marjoniemi with a knife by an order from Antikainen. This information, however, cannot be verified from other sources.

=== Return to the Soviet Union ===
After the 1939–1940 Winter War, Antikainen and the Finnish communist Adolf Taimi were released and deported to Soviet Union. Antikainen now found out that a large number of his old Finnish companions had vanished. After awkwardly questioning the party officials, he finally learned that they were killed in the Great Purge. This led into a nervous breakdown and Antikainen took leave of absence. In the summer of 1940, he was elected to the Supreme Soviet of the Soviet Union as the representative of the Karelo-Finnish Soviet Socialist Republic.

=== Death ===
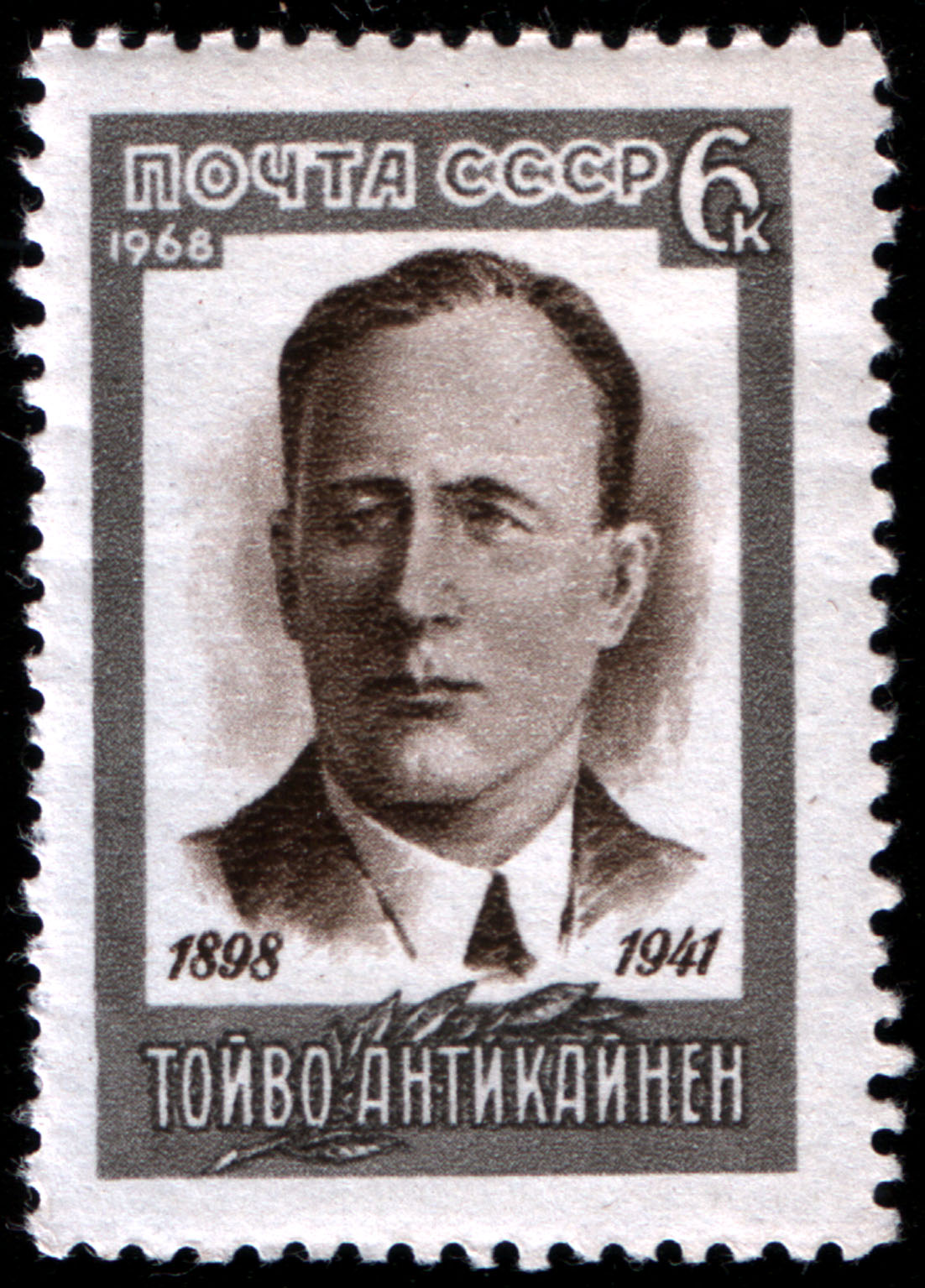
Toivo Antikainen in on 1968 Soviet stamp

Antikainen was allegedly killed in a plane crash near Arkhangelsk in October 1941. As he had openly criticized the Soviet leaders, some believe that his death was not an accident. According to the memoir of the exile Austrian communist Ruth von Mayenburg, Antikainen stayed at the Hotel Lux in Moscow and jumped out of the window as the NKVD officers were breaking his door. It is also claimed that he was assassinated by the later head of the Soviet Union Yuri Andropov, because Antikainen tried to take his place in the Komsomol of the Soviet Karelo-Finnish Republic.

Antikainen is buried to the village of Kegostrov in Arkhangelsk Oblast (currently in the city of Arkhangelsk). Streets in Petrozavodsk, Segezha and Kostomuksha are named after Antikainen. In 1970, the cargo ship MS Toyvo Antikaynen was named in his honor.
