= Children's Home No. 6 =

Buildings and structures in Moscow

Children's Home No. 6 was an orphanage in Moscow established for orphans from fascism. It was established for Austrian and German children and was considered a model in the Soviet Union, housing some 130 children. In 1938, a number of the teenaged residents were arrested in the so-called Hitler Youth conspiracy, bringing pressure to close the school.

Other institutions for German-speaking children were the Karl Liebknecht School and Ernst Thälmann summer camp, both of which closed around 1938.

Despite the efforts of the Austrian Communist Party to keep it open, the orphanage was closed in 1939, a week after the Molotov–Ribbentrop Pact.

== Notable former residents ==
- Wolfgang Leonhard
