= Turowo, Pisz County =

Turowo
- Village
- Location within Poland
- Coordinates: 53°31′N 21°54′E
- Country: Poland
- Voivodeship: Warmian-Masurian
- County: Pisz
- Gmina: Pisz
- Population: 300

Turowo [tuˈrɔvɔ] (German: Turowen) is a village in the administrative district of Gmina Pisz, within Pisz County, Warmian-Masurian Voivodeship, in northern Poland.

The village has a population of 300.

== Notable residents ==
- Gustav Sobottka (1886–1953), politician
