= Gustav Sobottka Jr. =

Gustav Sobottka Jr. (10 April 1915 – 22 September 1940) was a German communist and the son of Communist Party functionary and trade unionist Gustav Sobottka. He spent several months in Nazi concentration camps, then left Germany, eventually living in exile in the Soviet Union. He was arrested by the Soviet secret police at the age of 23 and accused of being part of the so-called Hitler Youth Conspiracy. Sobottka died in a Soviet prison.

== Early years ==
Gustav Sobottka Jr. was the younger son of Henriette "Jettchen" (née Schantowski) and Gustav Sobottka, a trade unionist and prominent Communist Party functionary. He had a sister and an older brother and was baptized in the Lutheran church in Röhlinghausen, today a district in Herne. His older brother was named Bernhard Sobottka (6 June 1911 – 20 July 1945).

Sobottka attended gymnasium in Germany and joined the Communist Youth in 1929. After the Nazis seized power, the Communist Party (German: Kommunistische Partei Deutschlands, or KPD) was outlawed, but Sobottka continued working for the party. He was arrested by the Gestapo on 11 August 1933 and was sent to the Nazi concentration camps at Oranienburg and Sonnenburg. He was released at the end of the year and fled to the Saarland, then under foreign occupation. He continued on to Paris, where his father had fled. His father was called to Moscow in 1935 and he and his mother made their way there at the end of 1935. His brother remained in Germany, working underground for the KPD. He was later arrested and sent to a concentration camp. In 1937, he, his brother and his parents were all deported by the Nazis.

== Exile and arrest ==
In the Soviet Union, he began using the cadre name "Hans Boden" and began working as a metalworker. He continued his education, learning Russian and going to school in Moscow at the "Rabfak", the Workers' University, in addition to working at a factory. Later, he began attending evening classes at a Moscow institute.

Sobottka was granted Soviet citizenship in December 1936. On 1 April 1936 Sobottka, Max Maddalena Jr. and Harry Schmidt were involved with an article in the Deutsche Zentral Zeitung, the newspaper of the German-speaking section of the Communist International, entitled "Wir freuen uns auf unser Jugendfest!" ("We're looking forward to our Youth Festival!").

On the evening of 4 February 1938 he was arrested on the street by the Soviet secret police, the NKVD, and immediately taken for an interrogation that lasted 15 hours. Subsequent interrogations in the following days included abuse and torture, which began when Sobottka denied having engaged in counter-revolutionary activity. He was called a fascist and was repeatedly pressured to sign a confession, at one point, with a pistol held against his chest.

During one torture-filled interrogation, he refused to sign a confession, after which he was put in a neighboring room and told to "think up something criminal" to write down in a confession. Certain he could withstand no more beatings and pressured by the command to fabricate misdeeds, Sobottka Jr. tried to commit suicide by cutting his wrists with glass shards from a broken lamp. He was transferred to the Taganka Prison infirmary, where he was surrounded by other prisoner patients who were bedridden with spinal cord injuries and other severe injuries resulting from torture, and he became convinced that his situation was hopeless. The other prisoners advised him that the only way to end the torture was to sign the confession dictated by the NKVD. On 9 March 1938 Sobottka was again interrogated, this time having made the decision it was necessary to write whatever confession was dictated to him.

Despite his father's stature within the party, Sobottka's parents were not told where he was being kept for months. During an NKVD interrogation session on 21 April 1938, two years after the publication of their article together, other young German exiles, Max Maddalena Jr., son of another important party functionary, Max Maddalena; and Harry Schmidt, named Hans Boden as one of the people involved in an espionage and sabotage ring. Sobottka was later accused of having ties to the anti-Comintern conspiracy involving Béla Kun, Osip Piatnitsky and Waldemar Knorin, all former Comintern leaders. Sobottka was accused of having been "assigned"—by a leading KPD functionary—the difficult job of assassinating Vyacheslav Molotov.

With Nikolai Yezhov's fall from grace by the end of 1938, the NKVD began investigating charges of torture and mishandling of the Hitler Youth Conspiracy. Sobottka testified in a hearing, on 28 December 1938, about the methods used to interrogate him. During the hearing, Sobottka affirmed he was not a fascist, nor had he ever engaged in counter-revolutionary activity. He said he wanted to tell the truth because in addition to the lies he confessed about himself, under the conditions of abuse and torture, he had also named others. He also denied he had ever planned to kill Molotov in August 1937, as he had "admitted", and furthermore, that he had never possessed the gun, and that he could not have gone to the appointed place because he was then on vacation in the Caucasus, which could easily be confirmed by records from the three cities he had visited. Despite letters written by his father and one by Wilhelm Pieck to Dmitry Manuilsky on April 9, 1939, recommending release for 16 people, including Sobottka, he was not released from prison.

In June 1939, Sobottka's parents were finally told the whereabouts of their son, that he was being held in Taganka Prison, but that because of insufficient evidence, the trial could not proceed. His parents thought he would soon be released, but instead, Gustav Sobottka Sr. was fired from his job and the parents' extension of their right to live in Moscow was shuffled into a bureaucratic maze. The situation caused his mother to have a nervous breakdown and be hospitalized.

Sobottka wrote of his hopelessness in 1940, after he'd been in prison for 26 months. Though he still had faith in the KPD, he said he'd lost hope that the truth would prevail and he'd escape his situation. He added that if his faith in the party were shattered, the result would be his mental and physical collapse. Just a few months later, on 22 September 1940, Sobottka died in Butyrka prison, according to some sources, from injuries sustained during torture; others say he was shot. His parents weren't told about their son's death until the beginning of 1941.

More than a decade after his death, a declaration of death was issued. Sobottka was rehabilitated in 1956 after an examination of his case found "no incriminating evidence".
