= Gustav Sobottka =

German politician (1886–1953)

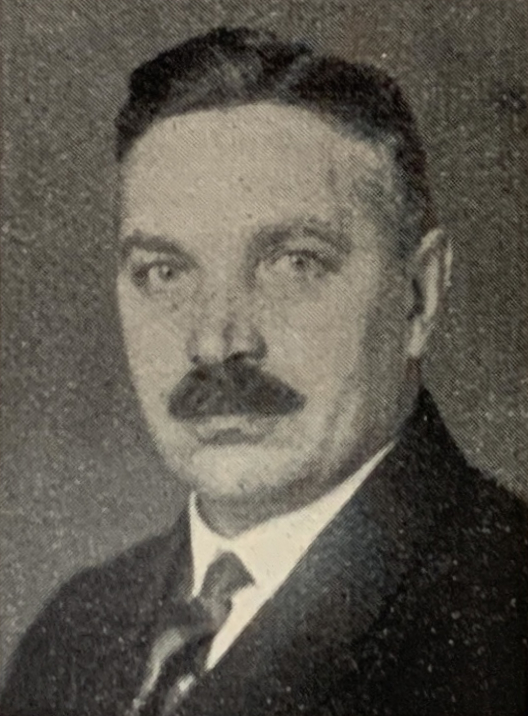
- Sobottka c. 1928
- Born: 12 July 1886; Turowen, East Prussia, German Empire
- Died: 6 March 1953 (aged 66); East Berlin, East Germany
- Occupations: Politician, unionist
- Political party: Communist (KPD), (SED)
- Children: Bernhard Sobottka, Gustav Sobottka, Jr.,

Gustav Sobottka (12 July 1886 – 6 March 1953) was a German politician, a member of the Communist Party of Germany in exile during the Nazi era who returned in 1945 as head of the Sobottka Group and later worked in the East German government.

== Early life ==
Gustav Sobottka was born in Turowen (Turowo), in the administrative district of Johannisburg (Pisz) in East Prussia. His father, Adam Sobottka, was a roofer and day laborer, his mother was Auguste Sobottka. In 1895, the family moved to Röhlinghausen, today the southwestern part of Herne, in the Ruhr region. The family were Muckers Pietists, a pious movement within the Lutheran church. Sobottka was confirmed in 1901 and began working in the coal mines that same year. In 1909, he married Henriette, née Schantowski, called "Jettchen" (9 March 1888 – 15 September 1971). He and his wife had a daughter and two sons. In World War I Sobottka served in the German Army from August 1914 to November 1918.

== Political life ==
Sobottka joined the Social Democrats in 1910, and his wife joined in 1912. Later, he was one of the founders of the Independent Social Democratic Party of Germany and became the leader in the Bochum-Gelsenkirchen district. At the end of 1920, he joined the Communist Party (Kommunistische Partei Deutschlands, or KPD). He was also one of the founding members and head of the "Miners' Group" in the communist-leaning Union of Manual and Intellectual Workers, whose 1925 merger into the confederation of unions, the Allgemeiner Deutscher Gewerkschaftsbund, he initially opposed, but later worked to accomplish.

Sobottka served in the Prussian Landtag as a representative of the KPD and he was the leader of the mining industry group of the KPD Central Committee. After he was expelled in 1928 from the Free Trade Unions' Miners' Association, in 1929, he became one of the founders and leading members of the Revolutionary Trade Union Opposition. In 1930, he became general secretary of the International Committee of Miners. In 1932, he was not nominated to be a candidate for the Prussian Landtag and so began working with the Rote Hilfe (Red Aid). After the Nazi Party seized power, as communists were threatened by arrest and attack, he worked underground, then went to the Saarland, then still under foreign occupation. He then went to Paris and continued his work. In spring 1935, the International Red Aid summoned him to Moscow.

Toward the end of 1935, his wife and son, Gustav, Jr. were able to travel to the Soviet Union via Paris. His other son, Bernhard (6 June 1911 – 20 July 1945), remained in Germany. He was arrested and imprisoned in Nazi concentration camp. He was liberated from Fuhlsbüttel, but died in the infirmary, shortly afterward. Before fleeing to the Soviet Union, Gustav Sobottka, Jr. had been in two Nazi concentration camps. He was arrested by the NKVD on February 5, 1938, as part of the so-called Hitler Youth Conspiracy, after which his mother had a nervous breakdown. Sobottka, Jr. was tortured and tried to commit suicide. In a letter he wrote after more than two years in custody, he said he'd given up all hope. He died in Moscow's Butyrka prison in September 1940. Because of his son's arrest, Sobottka, Sr. was fired from his job on the unions' central council of in March 1938 and was himself investigated.

In 1943, Sobottka was condemned to death in absentia for high treason by the Reich Military Court (Reichskriegsgericht).

== Postwar and final years ==
In 1945, Sobottka returned to Germany from the Soviet Union as leader of the Sobottka Group, which along with the Ulbricht Group and the Ackermann Group, were sent to lay the groundwork for the Soviet Military Administration in Germany. Sobottka reported on the chaos in Germany as forced labour from Poland and Russia turned on their former masters. Those who left would take animals and farm machinery with them leaving whole villages without either a cow or a farm worker.

Sobottka's group was sent to Mecklenburg, (today Mecklenburg-Vorpommern) where he prepared reports on the state of the agriculture for the Soviet Central Committee.

From 1947 to 1948, he was president of the Central Administration for the Combustible Fuel Industry. (Note: His secretary was Elli Barczatis, later tried and executed for spying.) From 1949 to 1951, he worked for the East German Ministry for Heavy Industry.

Sobottka retired with an honorary pension as an "Honored Miner of the German Democratic Republic", but was depressed about his son's death in Moscow and his wife's ill health. On 5 March 1953 he learned about the death of Joseph Stalin and was so overcome he died the following day in East Berlin. His wife was away at a health resort at the time. Gustav Sobottka, Jr. was rehabilitated in 1956.

== Recognition ==
Sobottka received an "Honorary pension, Fighter against Fascism" and was awarded "Honored Miner of the German Democratic Republic". The VEB Braunkohlenwerk in Röblingen (1953–1986) was named for Gustav Sobottka, as were many streets and schools. Some have since been renamed, but in Zeitz, there is still a Gustav-Sobottka-Straße A number of units in the National People's Army were named after Gustav Sobottka, as well.

In 1996, there was a documentary film made about Sobottka. It was made by Hans-Dieter Rusch and was called Vom Geheimnis eines Revolutionärs — Nachdenken über Gustav Sobottka. It was released by the film company Havel-Barbelsberg on 12 March 1996. (Note: The source may have misspelled the film company's name and it may actually be Havel-Babelsberg.)

== Sources ==
- Hermann Weber, Die Wandlung des deutschen Kommunismus. Die Stalinisierung der KPD in der Weimarer Republik. Band 2. Frankfurt am Main (1969), p. 308
- Peter Erler, Helmut Müller-Enbergs, Wer war wer in der DDR?, 5th edition. Ch. Links Verlag, Berlin (2010) ISBN 978-3-86153-561-4, Band 2
