= Hitler Youth conspiracy =

Case investigated by the Soviet secret police

The Hitler Youth conspiracy was a case investigated by the Soviet secret police during the Great Purge in the late 1930s. It resulted in the arrest of numerous adolescent Germans, some in their twenties and beyond. They were accused of having been fascist, anti-communist members of the Hitler Youth, who were working against the Soviet Union. Teenagers from the Karl Liebknecht School, from Children's Home No. 6, and adults from factories and elsewhere were arrested, tortured, and imprisoned. Many were executed or died in custody. Some were the children of leading communists. Within years, the investigation was found to have been faulty and a number of the investigators were also arrested, with sentences ranging from imprisonment to execution. In the 1950s, following the death of Joseph Stalin, a new examination of the files revealed many of the accusations to have been baseless and a number of the victims were rehabilitated.

== Background ==
With Stalin's seizure of power in 1927, a campaign of purges and mass repressions within the Soviet Union began, which also included purges of the Communist Party, both within the Soviet Union and abroad. The number of those who were charged with being counter-revolutionary or fascist increased substantially during these waves of persecution. In his "Secret Speech", Nikita Khrushchev said that between 1936 and 1937, the number of arrests for counter-revolutionary crimes grew ten times.

At the February–March 1937 plenary meeting of the Central Committee of the Communist Party of the Soviet Union (CPSU), there was a renewed call to purge the party of Trotskyite elements, unleashing a wave of mass terror in the summer of 1937. The term "counter-revolutionary fascist groups" came into use within the Soviet secret police in 1938, as they carried out these purges. At a meeting on April 28, 1938, German members of the Executive Committee of the Communist International reported that there had been 842 arrests.

As early as 1930, the Soviet secret police, the Cheka (later the People's Commissariat for Internal Affairs or NKVD), investigated teenage Germans suspected of being members of the Hitler Youth, but these investigations preceded the Great Purge and those arrested were not given the harsh sentences of later years. Most were released before 1934. As the Great Purge swept up communist activists in massive arrests, their spouses and children were also persecuted. Some were banished to a gulag, some children were put in orphanages and in some cases, older children were themselves arrested and charged with anti-revolutionary activity and forming anti-revolutionary groups. International communists living in the Soviet Union were hard hit, especially Germans, who were there in large numbers, fleeing Nazism. While German parents were rounded up and accused of espionage, this charge was not plausible for foreign children who had not been outside the Soviet Union in years. Instead, they were charged with having formed a branch of the Hitler Youth.

== New allegations ==
Investigations regarding NKVD Order Number 8842 – the Hitler Youth conspiracy – began in January 1938. The commissar of the NKVD gave an order to find and arrest a group of young people who were alleged to have formed a branch of the Hitler Youth and were planning acts of sabotage and assassination. They were also accused of praising Adolf Hitler. Department 4 of the Main Directorate of State Security under the NKVD handled secret political affairs and took care of the administration of the case while Department 7, which handled foreign intelligence, implemented the orders.

Those carrying out the arrests were directed to reach quotas for both arrests and confessions and were given deadlines. An interpreter who served during the interrogations, Rudolph Traibman, later said that when he complained to his superior, he was threatened with arrest. According to another contemporary, Leonid M. Sakovsky, "When Sorokin and Persitz ordered G. Yakubovich to sign arrest warrants, Yakubovich laid his wristwatch on the desk and said, 'Look how many arrest warrants I can sign in one minute.' And then he began to sign the warrants, without reading them." (Note: Mikhail Persitz was the commandant of the 4th department of the UGB. Yakubovich is spelled by some sources as "Iakubovich" or "Yakubovitch". In German, it is written, "Jakubowitsch" and "Soviet Union" is spelled "Sowjetunion", according to German rules of pronunciation.) The investigations produced completed arrest reports that, according to one historian, are hardly worth reading; they report no details other than personal identification. Instead, they followed a template, devoid of other evidence.

Some 70 teenagers and adults were arrested between January and March 1938, primarily the children of German and Austrian foreign workers and exiles, but also a few Russians. Some of those arrested were not members of the Hitler Youth; 20 were over the age of 30 and one was 62. Others were students at local technical schools or workers in factories. There were 13 pupils and two teachers arrested from the Karl Liebknecht School and a number from Children's Home No. 6. There were seven people, most adults, from the Left Column theater troupe, including Helmut Damerius, a close friend of Wilhelm Pieck's son, Arthur, also an actor and Bruno Schmidtsdorf, the lead actor in Gustav von Wangenheim's 1935 film, Kämpfer. (Note: The film's original Russian title was Bortsy. It was released in the United States as Der Kampf.) Schmidtsdorf was arrested on February 5, 1938, with fellow troupe members Kurt Ahrendt and Karl Oefelein, all charged with founding a branch of the Hitler Youth. All three were executed three weeks later. Ahrendt was also from the Karl Liebknecht School, where he was a leader of the Young Pioneers.

Those arrested were tortured and often confessed quickly to alleged crimes, either to try to bring the torture to a halt or because they were advised by those longer in custody that it was their only hope for relief from the beatings, which could last for hours. A number of those arrested were the children of prominent communists, such as Hans Beimler, Jr., son of Hans Beimler; Max Maddalena, Jr., son of Max Maddalena; and Gustav Sobottka, Jr., the son of Gustav Sobottka.

Of those arrested, 6 were released, 20 were sentenced from five to ten years, 40 were executed, two were returned to Germany and the Gestapo under the Molotov–Ribbentrop Pact; and one died in prison. The first execution was on February 20, 1938, at the Butovo firing range; an additional 39 people were executed there between March and May 1938.

== Aftermath ==
Mikhail Persitz was ousted from the NKVD and arrested in April 1939 and indicted with three paragraphs of Article 58. He was tortured and confessed his guilt, though he later recanted. An NKVD troop tribunal tried Persitz and found him guilty of all charges. He was shot on February 2, 1940. Ivan Sorokin, who had been head of the 3rd Department of the Main Directorate of State Security, was charged with mishandling prisoners and fabricating charges. He was tried at an NKVD troop tribunal in August 1939 and was sentenced to death, a sentence confirmed by the Supreme Soviet.

After Stalin's death, a re-examination of the case revealed that the charges were baseless. Survivors were released from detention in 1954 and 1955. Gustav Sobottka, Jr. was rehabilitated postmortem in 1956.

== Partial list of those arrested ==
- Kurt Ahrendt, age 30 – executed 1938
- Hans Beimler, Jr., teenager
- Helmut Damerius – tortured, sentenced to a gulag and banished to Kazakhstan
- Hans Klering, adult – later co-founder of DEFA
- Wilhelm Klug, age 17 – survived
- Max Maddalena, Jr., teenager – released and arrested again, following the German invasion, died in custody
- Karl Oefelein, age 29 – executed 1938
- Hans Petersen – sent back to Germany on the transport to Brest-Litovsk
- Wilhelm Reich – sent back to Germany via Brest-Litovsk
- Harry Schmitt – released in 1940
- Bruno Schmidtsdorf, age 29 – executed 1938
- Günther Schramm – released in 1940
- Gustav Sobottka, Jr., age 23 at time of arrest – died in custody at age 25
- Erwin Turra – sent back to Germany via Brest-Litovsk

== See also ==
- Hotel Lux
- Captain Volkonogov Escaped

== Sources ==
- Hans Schafranek, Natalia Musienko, "The Fictitious 'Hiter-Jugend' of the Moscow NKVD" in: Barry McLoughlin, Kevin McDermott (Eds.), Stalin's Terror: High Politics and Mass Repression in the Soviet Union. Palgrave MacMillan (2003), p. 208ff. ISBN 1-4039-0119-8
- Walter Laqueur, Generation Exodus: The Fate of Young Jewish Refugees from Nazi Germany. Brandeis University Press (2001), ISBN 1-58465-106-7 and Tauris Parke Paperbacks (2004), ISBN 1-86064-885-1. Original title: Geboren in Deutschland: Der Exodus der jüdischen Jugend nach 1933
