= Taganka Prison =

Former Russian prison

Coordinates: 55°44′06″N 37°39′16″E

Taganka Prison (Russian: Таганская тюрьма) was built in Moscow in 1804 by Alexander I, emperor of Russia. It gained notoriety for its use as a prison for political prisoners, both by the ruling tsars and during the years of the Soviet Union, by the Communist Party. During the Great Purge, the prison housed foreign enemies of the state, such as the German communist, Gustav Sobottka, Jr., as well as Russians. It played host to a mass protest in 1938 when thousands of prisoners repudiated their confessions made under torture. The prison became immortalized in poems and songs dating from before the October Revolution in 1918. The prison was razed in the 1950s.

Soviet 'martyr' Nikolay Bauman was beaten to death outside of Taganka Prison by a nationalist and reactionary mob upon the release of political prisoners 18 October 1905.

== Taganka (song) ==
Taganka is also the name of one of many Russian prisoners' songs. It takes its name from the prison and was popularized by Russian singers Vladimir Vysotsky and Mikhail Shufutinsky.

Lyrics
Russian	Romanization	Translation
Цыганка с картами, дорога дальняя. Дорога дальняя, казенный дом. Быть может старая, тюрьма центральная Меня, мальчишечку, по новой ждет. Быть может старая, тюрьма центральная Меня, мальчишечку, по новой ждет. [Припев:] Таганка, все ночи, полные огня, Таганка, зачем сгубила ты меня? Таганка, я твой бессменный арестант, Погибли юность и талант в твоих стенах. Таганка, я твой бессменный арестант, Погибли юность и талант в твоих стенах. Я знаю, милая, больше не встретимся... Дороги разные нам суждены. Опять по пятницам пойдут свидания И слезы горькие моей родни. Опять по пятницам пойдут свидания И слезы горькие моей родни. [Припев]	Tsyganka s kartami, doroga dal'nyaya, Doroga dal'nyaya, kazyonnyj dom... Byt' mozhet, staraya tyur'ma tsentral'naya, Menia, mal'chishechku, po novoj zhdyot. Byt' mozhet, staraya tyur'ma tsentral'naya, Menia, mal'chishechku, po novoj zhdyot. [Refrain:] Taganka, vse nochi polnye ognja, Taganka, zachem sgubila ty menja, Taganka, ya tvoj bessmenny arestant, Pogibli junost' i talant v tvoikh stenah. Taganka, ya tvoj bessmenny arestant, Pogibli junost' i talant v tvoikh stenah. Ya znayu, milaya, bol'she ne vstretimsya... Dorogi raznye nam suzhdeny. Opyat' po pyatnitsam pojdut svidaniya I slyozy gor'kie moyej rodni. Opyat' po pyatnitsam pojdut svidaniya I slyozy gor'kie moyej rodni. [Refrain]	A gypsy with cards, a long journey, A long journey, a prison... Perhaps the old central prison Again awaits me, a boy. Perhaps the old central prison Again awaits me, a boy. [Refrain:] Taganka, all nights filled with fire, Taganka, why have you ruined me? Taganka, I'm your eternal inmate, My youth and talent have withered inside your walls. Taganka, I'm your eternal inmate, My youth and talent have withered inside your walls. I know, beloved, we won't meet again... We are destined to separate paths. Again it'll be conjugal visits on Fridays And bitter tears of my relatives. Again it'll be conjugal visits on Fridays And bitter tears of my relatives. [Refrain]

== Notable prisoners ==
- Seraphim Chichagov (1856–1937)
- Pavel Florensky (1882–1937)
- Marcel Pauker (1896–1938)
- Thomas Sgovio (1916–1997) - American
- Ivan Mikhailovich Tregubov (1858-1931)
