= Karl Liebknecht School =

The Karl Liebknecht School (German: Karl-Liebknecht-Schule), named after Karl Liebknecht, was a German-language elementary school in Moscow. It was established for the children of German refugees to the Soviet Union. It opened in 1924 and was closed in 1939. A number of students and teachers were caught up in the Great Purge and the so-called Hitler Youth Conspiracy, many of them executed.

== Background ==
After the October Revolution, communists in other countries were encouraged to come to the Soviet Union to help build the world's first communist state. Germany under the Weimar Republic was in turmoil, particularly during the between 1919 and 1923, and had a large Communist Party. Numerous members went to the Soviet Union, both for training and as refugees from persecution by political enemies. The Karl Liebknecht School was founded to educate the children of German refugees in the German language, however some Russians also sent their children there.

The school acquired a nickname, Shkola Nashikh Mechtei ("the school of our dreams") and had an orchestra, which was popular with local Muscovites. Hans Hauska, a member of the German Theater's Left Column, led the choir.

In the first years of the school, as was the case in early Soviet education, there was no history taught. Also, common to other schools employing ideas of progressive education, there no tests or grades, however some by 1935, some practices were "denounced as Trotskyite" and were abandoned. With the help of headmistress Elsa Weber, the school moved into a proper school building on September 1, 1928.

== Purges and closing ==
During the 1934-1935 school year, there were 750 pupils at the school and a new headmistress, a Hungarian named Sophie Krammer. The previous headmaster was Helmut Schinkel, who had begun working there in 1932, but had made political mistakes. For the final five months, the headmaster was a Russian, named Antip Vassilyevitch Brukov.

The Soviet–German relations worsened following the coming of the Nazis to power in Germany in 1933, which seriously affected the school. In the middle of the school year, a group of pupils were deemed by the NKVD to be a fascist group. The pupil determined to be the leader, in the ninth grade, and another child were arrested, along with one teacher. Each was later sentenced. In 1936, the NKVD determined that among the teachers was a "counter-revolutionary, fascist-Trotskyite group". Other cases took place both inside and outside the school. In one case in 1936, a married couple was driven to suicide and in 1937, a number of pupils were executed. Two teachers, Kurt Bertram and Rudolf Senglaub, and thirteen students were arrested in the Hitler Youth Conspiracy, including Kurt Ahrendt, a leader of the Young Pioneers, who was executed three weeks after his arrest. By the time the purges subsided, 25 teachers and 40 pupils and former pupils had been arrested, as well as many parents. Many never returned. The school was closed in 1938 after it was decided that schools for national minorities were not in sync with the communist party line.

When the school was closed, children were sent to local Russian schools, to which not all children adapted well.

There was a summer camp for the German-speaking children, the Ernst Thälmann summer camp, which was also closed at the same time.

== Notable pupils ==
- Stefan Doernberg
- Peter Florin
- Marianne Lange-Weinert, author and daughter of Erich Weinert
- Wolfgang Leonhard
- Konrad Wolf
- Markus Wolf

== See also ==
- Children's Home No. 6
