= Clemens Laby =

German mining engineer, West German Intelligence spy (1900 - 1984)

- Born: November 22, 1900; Beuthen, Upper Silesia (now Bytom, Poland)
- Died: January 17, 1984 (aged 83); Bonn, West Germany
- Occupation: mining engineer
- Known for: alleged espionage activity for West German intelligence

Clemens Laby (22 November 1900 – 17 January 1984) was a German mining engineer. During the early 1950s he worked as a spy for West German Intelligence according to various records found in the Stasi archives. This is also attested by evidence surfaced in surviving East German trial transcripts and East German newspaper reports of the period. The West German Intelligence Service (which took over from its early 1950s equivalent only in 1956) has always maintained that it has found no reference to Laby in its own archives, however.

== Life ==
Clemens Laby was born in Beuthen (today known as Bytom), a mining city near Kattowitz (today Katowice) in Upper Silesia. Towards the end of his time at senior school, around 1920, he worked as an intern at the "Oheimgrube" (today Wujek) coal mine. He then moved on to the Technical University (TU) of Berlin where he studied mine engineering, obtaining his degree in or before 1926. It is from the record of his registration at the TU that his birth date and birthplace can be ascertained. The outcome of the 1921 plebiscite had moved the Polish frontier close to Beuthen, and in 1926 Laby went to work for the Polish mining administration. After the Annexation of Western Poland by the German army Laby was transferred to Germany's national head office of the Combustible Fuels Industry, taking a senior management position in the Bituminous coal department based in Berlin. It was here that he met the jurist Karl Laurenz in 1945, while Laby was working as a safety expert with the "Mining Technical Inspectorate". Between 1946 and 1949 Laby was also working as personal assistant to the President of the National Administration (for what had become, in May 1945, the Soviet occupation zone). The National Administration was the forerunner to the Ministry for Coal and Energy in what became, in October 1949, the German Democratic Republic. According to testimony given by Laurenz at his trial in 1955, Laby had had to leave the National Administration in 1949 because he had had to relocate from East to West Berlin – something he had done only reluctantly.

As a member of the Catholic Student Association, "AV Hansa Berlin", Laby had links to the Union of Catholic German Student Fraternities ("Cartelverband" / CV), where he was able to meet up colleagues from the old Upper Silesian Mining industry, many of whom, by 1945, had ended up in what became West Germany in 1949. Some of these soon held senior positions in the West German coal industry, including Anton Große-Boymann and Heinrich Kost, employed after 1947 in the British occupation zone by the North German Coal Corporation, predecessor organisation of the International Authority for the Ruhr established in 1949.

After moving to West Berlin Laby relocated again, this time to Essen where he worked with the West German Coal Mining Management. In 1947 he started recruiting former colleagues still in the Soviet occupation zone whom he knew from his time as a student and with the mines National Administration in East Berlin, who might provide information to the west on working conditions in the Soviet occupation zone. One of his recruits was the East German Professor of Mining Otto Fleischer: another was the legal adviser to the mining industry, Karl Laurenz. Laby recommended Fleischer to move from his home in Zwickau to the west so that he might be used as a source of information on the East German mining industry. Laby presented himself to Fleischer as an employee of the Western Coal industry. Laurenz was told that Laby worked for the Gehlen Organization.

Laby became a member of the League of Expellees and those Deprived of Rights ("Bund der Heimatvertriebenen und Entrechteten" / BHE), and anti-communist political which was founded in 1950 and which took an interest In East German intelligence services. After that, he disappears from the sources.

Clemens Laby died in Bonn in 1984, leaving behind a widow.
