= Königs Wusterhausen radio transmitter =

Coordinates: 52°17′30″N 13°37′30″E

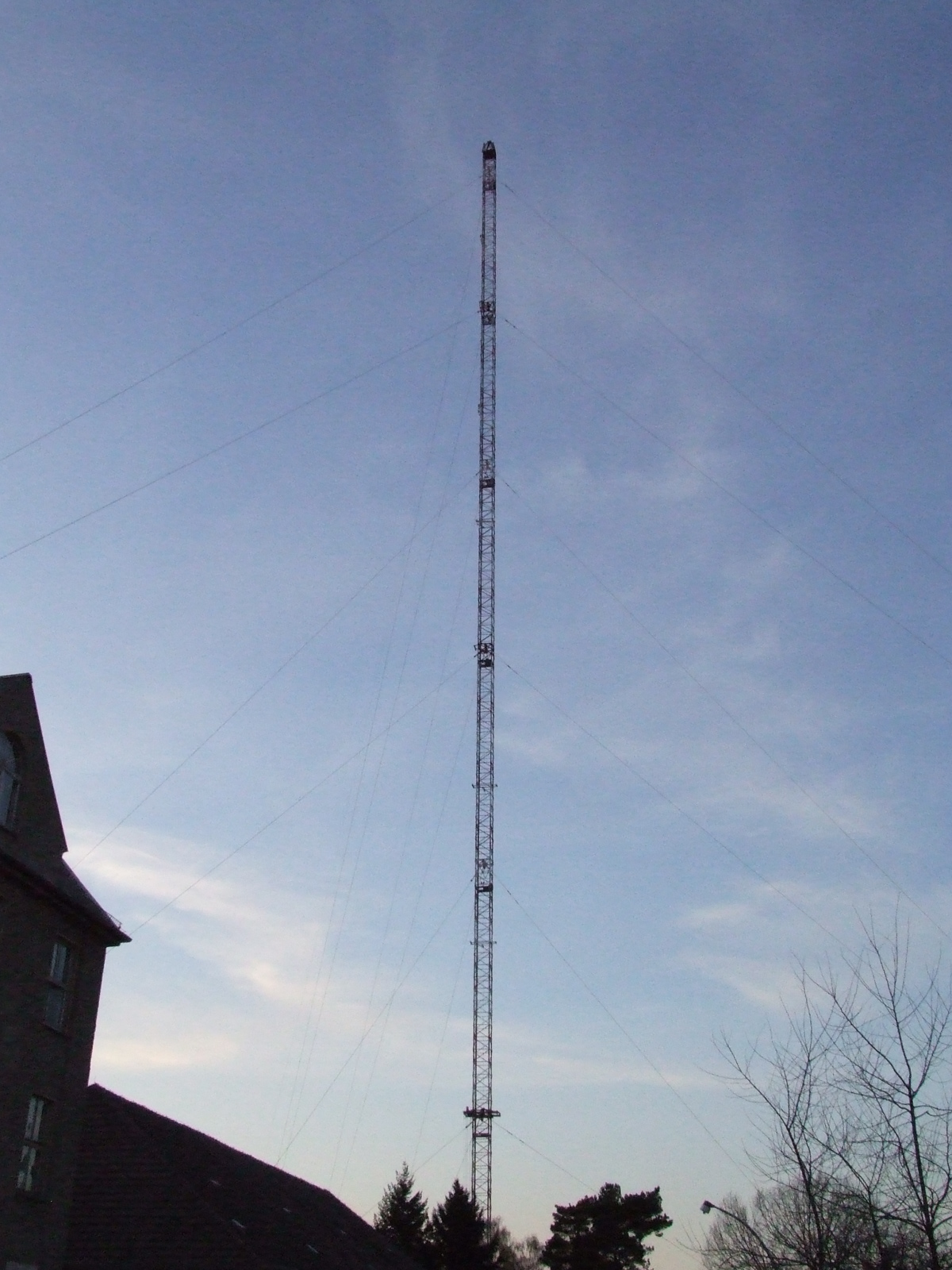
Königs Wusterhausen transmitter, 2006

The Königs Wusterhausen transmitter (German: Sender Königs Wusterhausen) was a large transmission facility for longwave, mediumwave and shortwave radio, located near Königs Wusterhausen southeast of Berlin, Germany. Initially built by the telegraph battalion of the German Army, operation began during World War I in 1916. On 22 December 1920, the transmission of a Christmas concert marked the birth of public broadcasting in Germany.

== History ==
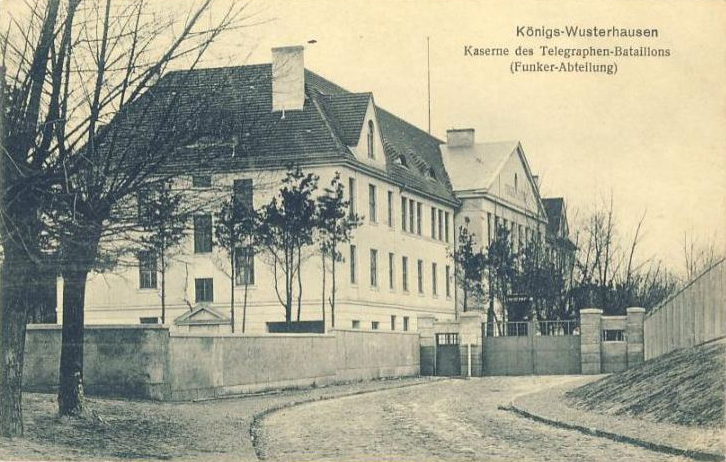
Barracks of the telegraph battalion, Königs Wusterhausen (postcard, about 1915)

The German armed forces had conducted experiments in radio technology on the Windmühlenberg hill northwest of Königs Wusterhausen since 1911, with mobile stations mounted on horse carriages and antennas held up by captive balloons. Extended signal corps facilities were erected at the site from 1913 onwards, including a large antenna system and several functional buildings. Later called Senderhaus 1, the military broadcasting station was put into operation in 1916.

After the war, the German Reichspost took over the barracks with effect from September 1919 and used the facilities for the transmission of weather reports, financial news, and telegrams. Radio broadcasting was initiated by post official Hans Bredow and his staff when they used an arc converter supplied by C. Lorenz AG for the first transmission of speech and music in the longwave range on 22 December 1920, making Königs Wusterhausen the "cradle of German broadcasting". After private radio reception was authorised by law in 1923, transmissions quickly developed throughout the Weimar Republic. The facilities soon had to be enlarged and a second station building (Sendehaus 2) was inaugurated in 1923

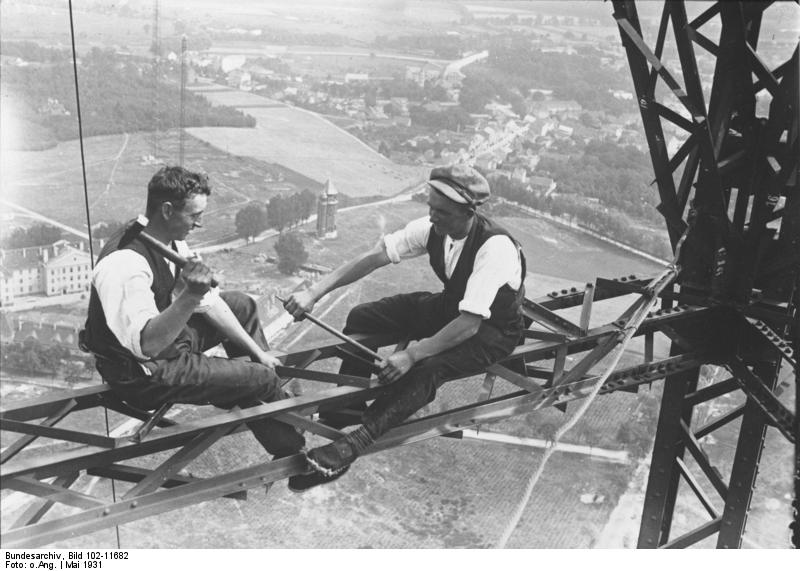
Repair work on the Central Tower, 1931

At Königs Wusterhausen, a nationwide Deutschlandsender transmitter was erected in 1925, then consisting of several masts with heights from 100 m (330 ft) up to 210 m (690 ft) and the 243 m (797 ft) high Central Tower. It was soon followed by a longwave transmitter in nearby Zeesen (Deutschlandsender II) and the first public shortwave transmitter for international broadcasting (Weltrundfunksender), built by the Telefunken company and inaugurated in August 1929. After the Nazi seizure of power in 1933, these facilities were extensively used for propaganda purposes.

With the end of World War II, Königs Wusterhausen was part of the Soviet occupation zone and several masts were taken down by order of the military government, though the station remained in use for broadcasting in East Germany. The Central Tower collapsed during the Cyclone Quimburga on 15 November 1972. At the date of German reunification in 1990, there was only one 210 m (690 ft) high mast with a longwave aerial, two masts for a T-aerial for medium wave and some small towers. The remaining transmitters for mediumwave, shortwave and longwave were shut down between 1992 and 1999 and the whole area was transformed into a museum, which is marked by the 210-metre-high mast.

For mobile phone services and low power FM broadcasting, a 67-metre-high free-standing tower of concrete was built in 1994.

== See also ==
- List of transmission sites
- List of tallest structures
