= Reichs-Rundfunk-Gesellschaft =

German broadcasting network

Reichs-Rundfunk-Gesellschaft mbH
- Type: Radio network; Television station
- Country: Weimar Republic; Nazi Germany
- Availability: National and international
- Owner: Deutsche Reichspost; Ministry of Public Enlightenment and Propaganda (from 1933)
- Key people: Hans Bredow, Eugen Hadamovsky
- Launch date: 15 May 1925
- Dissolved: 1951–1961 (liquidation)
- Replaced by: ARD (1950 to present); Rundfunk der DDR (1952–1991)

The Reichs-Rundfunk-Gesellschaft (RRG; Reich Broadcasting Corporation) was a national network of German regional public radio and television broadcasting companies active from 1925 until 1945. The programs of the RRG reached all parts of Germany. RRG was used extensively for Nazi propaganda after 1933.

Historical recordings of RRG broadcasts are today held by the German Broadcasting Archive.

== History ==
The company was established in Berlin on 15 May 1925 with a start capital of 100,000 Reichsmark as an umbrella organisation by nine regional broadcasters – that is to say, all of the German radio stations other than the Deutsche Stunde in Bayern – serving the various states of the Weimar Republic. From 1926, a majority share was held by the state-owned Deutsche Reichspost authority, represented by RF engineer and Reichspostministerium official Hans Bredow as chairman in the rank of a Reichs-Rundfunk-Kommissar.

The logo of the RRG was designed by German graphic designer Otto Firle.

An official broadcast receiving licence was required for the reception of radio broadcasts at a monthly fee of 2 Reichsmark. In 1932 there were four million registered radio users giving the corporation a revenue of four million Reichsmark.

== Original structure ==
Programming was provided by the following eleven regional broadcasting companies:

- Funk-Stunde AG, Berlin: the first regular broadcaster in Germany (on the air since 28 October 1923), covering the Prussian provinces of Brandenburg, western Pomerania (Stettin) and the northern Province of Saxony (Magdeburg) as well as the eastern parts of Mecklenburg-Schwerin and Mecklenburg-Strelitz On Air 29 October 1923 as the first Radio Station in Germany
- Mitteldeutsche Rundfunk AG (MIRAG), Leipzig (on the air since 2 March 1924), covering the Saxony, Thuringia, and the southern part of the Prussian Province of Saxony (Halle)
- Deutsche Stunde in Bayern GmbH, Munich (on the air since 30 March 1924) in Bavaria; renamed Bayerischer Rundfunk GmbH on 1 January 1931, it joined the RRG in 1933
- Südwestdeutsche Rundfunkdienst AG (SÜWRAG), Frankfurt am Main (since 31 March 1924) in the People's State of Hesse and the Prussian province of Hesse-Nassau
- Nordische Rundfunk AG (NORAG), Hamburg (since 2 May 1924) and Bremen (on the air since 30 November 1924), covering the Prussian provinces of Schleswig-Holstein and Hanover, as well as the Free State of Brunswick, the Free State of Oldenburg and western Mecklenburg-Schwerin; became Norddeutsche Rundfunk GmbH in November 1932
- Süddeutsche Rundfunk AG (SÜRAG), Stuttgart (on the air since 11 May 1924), covering Württemberg, Baden and the Prussian Province of Hohenzollern
- Schlesische Funkstunde AG (SFAG), Breslau (on the air since 26 May 1924) and Gleiwitz (from 1 November 1925), in the Prussian provinces of Lower and Upper Silesia
- Ostmarken Rundfunk AG (ORAG), Königsberg (on the air since 14 June 1924), covering the Prussian provinces of East Prussia and eastern Pomerania (Köslin), as well as the Free City of Danzig (see also Radio Königsberg)
- Westdeutsche Funkstunde AG (WEFAG), Münster (on the air since 10 October 1924) in the Prussian Rhine Province and the Province of Westphalia, renamed Westdeutsche Rundfunk AG (WERAG) in 1926 and headquarters moved to Cologne)
- Reichssender Saarbrücken, Saarbrücken (on the air since 1 March 1935) in the Saarland
- Reichssender Wien, Vienna (on the air since 12 March 1938) in Austria

An additional nationwide programme known as the Deutschlandsender was broadcast on longwave from the Königs Wusterhausen radio transmitter of Deutsche Welle GmbH (a separate company which was, however, 70% owned by the Reichs-Rundfunk-Gesellschaft).

Regular television programmes were transmitted from Berlin by the Fernsehsender Paul Nipkow.

== Headquarters ==
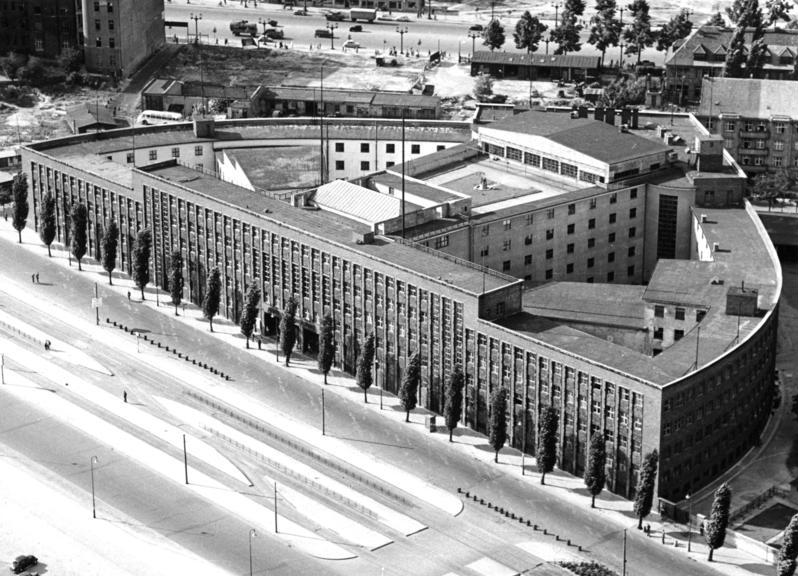
The Haus des Rundfunks in Berlin

On 22 January 1931 the Haus des Rundfunks ("House of Broadcasting"), on Masurenallee in Berlin-Westend, was inaugurated as the official seat of the Reichs-Rundfunk-Gesellschaft. Designed in 1929 by the architect Hans Poelzig (1869–1936), it is the world's first self-contained broadcasting centre and includes a large concert hall.

The triangular-shaped building also housed the broadcaster Deutsche Welle GmbH and, from 1935 until its relocation in 1937, the Fernsehsender Paul Nipkow television station.

== Nationalization ==
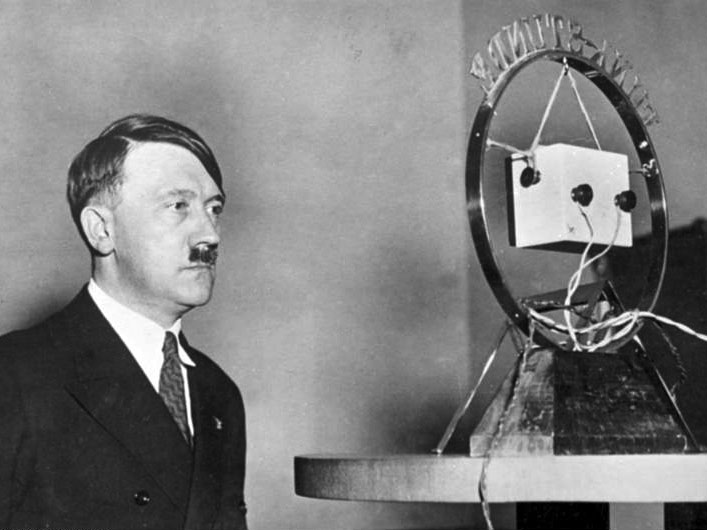
Adolf Hitler making his address to the nation at a Funk-Stunde microphone, following his appointment as Reich Chancellor in 1933

In the summer of 1932, the German government under Chancellor Franz von Papen started to gain control over the broadcasting companies of the RRG, full control over the corporation was reached in 1934. The regional broadcasters were also made reliant on the RRG, becoming local branches. The management board had to admit a representative, who supervised programming, delegated by the Minister of the Interior, Wilhelm von Gayl.

In the course of the Gleichschaltung process after the Machtergreifung in 1933 the RRG was nationalized by the Nazi government and was used extensively by the Ministry of Public Enlightenment and Propaganda under Joseph Goebbels to dictate radio programming. On 30 January 1933, while the new Minister of the Interior Wilhelm Frick enforced the live broadcast of the torchlight parades, the RRG chairman Hans Bredow resigned and was replaced by Eugen Hadamovsky. Several former managers were arrested and imprisoned. With effect from 1 April 1934 the regional broadcasting companies were incorporated as Reichssender.

Upon the affiliation of the Saar territory in 1935, the regional broadcaster was incorporated as Reichssender Saarbrücken (see Saarländischer Rundfunk). Likewise, after the Austrian Anschluss in 1938, the former Radio Verkehrs AG at Vienna became the Reichssender Wien. On 1 January 1939 the RRG was renamed Großdeutscher Rundfunk.

=== Programming 1939-1945 ===
Alongside entertainment, coverage of the war effort occupied a significant portion of radio programming during the Second World War. After the Invasion of Poland on 1 September 1939 upon the staged Gleiwitz incident, the former RRG became a vital instrument of wartime propaganda, especially by the daily Wehrmachtsbericht and the popular request show Wunschkonzert für die Wehrmacht (see Wunschkonzert).

Wehrmachtsbericht from the High Command of the Armed Forces (Oberkommando der Wehrmacht) were broadcast several times a day, supplemented by other news reports—some with military relevance, others without. Furthermore, the war was brought home to the audience through dispatches from propaganda companies (PK reports) and studio discussions featuring military personnel. Special bulletins, which had previously been introduced by distinct, specially composed fanfares, ceased to be used following the defeat at Stalingrad.

From 9 July 1940 onwards all Reichssender aired the same uniform nationwide program, which ended with the occupation of the Haus des Rundfunks by the Red Army during the Battle of Berlin on 2 May 1945.

== Volksempfänger and technical achievements ==
The Volksempfänger (people’s radio receiver) served as the technical counterpart to the Reichs-Rundfunk-Gesellschaft (RRG), designed to bring the state-controlled, homogenized programming of the Nazi regime into as many households as possible at an affordable price. The RRG was under the authority of Joseph Goebbels and the Reich Ministry of Public Enlightenment and Propaganda; the Volksempfänger was developed on the ministry's behalf as an inexpensive, standardized device designed to make RRG content accessible to everyone.

Volksempfänger was a technically very simple "audion" (regenerative) receiver designed for medium-wave and long-wave broadcasts. If a foreign station’s signal on the medium-wave or long-wave bands was strong enough, it could theoretically be heard—though doing so was prohibited. Foreign broadcasters, such as the German-language service of the British BBC, primarily used the short-wave bands. Since the Volksempfänger lacked a short-wave range, listening to these "enemy stations" ("Feindsender") was, in practice, either extremely difficult or entirely impossible.

=== Technical archivements ===
RRG engineers were responsible for important advances in sound-recording technology.

Walter Weber, while working for Hans Joachim von Braunmühl at the RRG, made many improvements in the field of magnetic tape sound recording. The most widely significant was the discovery of high frequency bias. This provided a major improvement in the fidelity of recordings. Others made the same discovery of HF bias before and after, but it was Weber's work that became widely used.

== See also ==
- Volksempfänger
- Nazi propaganda
