= Deutschlandsender Zeesen =

Facility for longwave broadcasting in Germany

Deutschlandsender Zeesen was a facility for longwave broadcasting near Zeesen, a district of Königs Wusterhausen in Germany. Built by the German Reichspost in 1927, it served the nationwide Deutschlandsender radio transmissions by the Deutsche Welle broadcaster.

== History ==
Construction started after the capacity of the first Königs Wusterhausen radio transmitter became insufficient to meet the growing demand. The completion of the Zeesen facility was delayed for three weeks, when the western of the two masts collapsed as its construction reached a height of 40 m (130 ft). The station was inaugurated on 20 December 1927, then called Deutschlandsender II.

The Zeesen transmitter's antenna comprised a 280 m-long (920 ft) and 12 m-wide (39 ft) T-antenna spun between two guyed 210 m-tall (690 ft) masts, which were 450 m (1,480 ft) apart. It was connected directly with the transmitter which was housed in a building in the middle of the two masts. Until 1928 Deutschlandsender II used the frequency 240 kHz. Afterwards its frequency was 183.5 kHz and, after 1934, 191 kHz. Its transmission power initially was 35 kilowatt; in 1931 it was increased to 60 kilowatt.

A neighbouring short-wave transmitter was erected in 1931. Kurt von Böckmann, who for eight years had run the Bavarian network, was appointed in 1933 April to head the station. In 1939, 250 people were employed operating ten transmitters, broadcasting a combined 70 hours of Nazi propaganda programming daily. This overtook even the BBC. In 1939 the Zeesen transmitter was replaced by Deutschlandsender III at Herzberg. In World War II it was used as reserve transmitter for the Herzberg station and for transmitting messages to agents of German's secret services. The facility was not destroyed in World War II, however, it was dismantled in 1945 by order of the Soviet occupation forces.

== See also ==
- List of transmission sites
- List of masts
