= Kersting =

Kersting is a surname. Notable people with the name include:

- Anthony F. Kersting (1916–2008), British architectural photographer
- Georg Friedrich Kersting (1785–1847), German painter
- Walter Maria Kersting (1889–1970), German architect and industrial designer

== See also ==
- Kersting-Modellbauwerkstätten, a defunct German motor manufacturer
