= Volksempfänger =

Standardized simple radio receiver type made in Nazi Germany

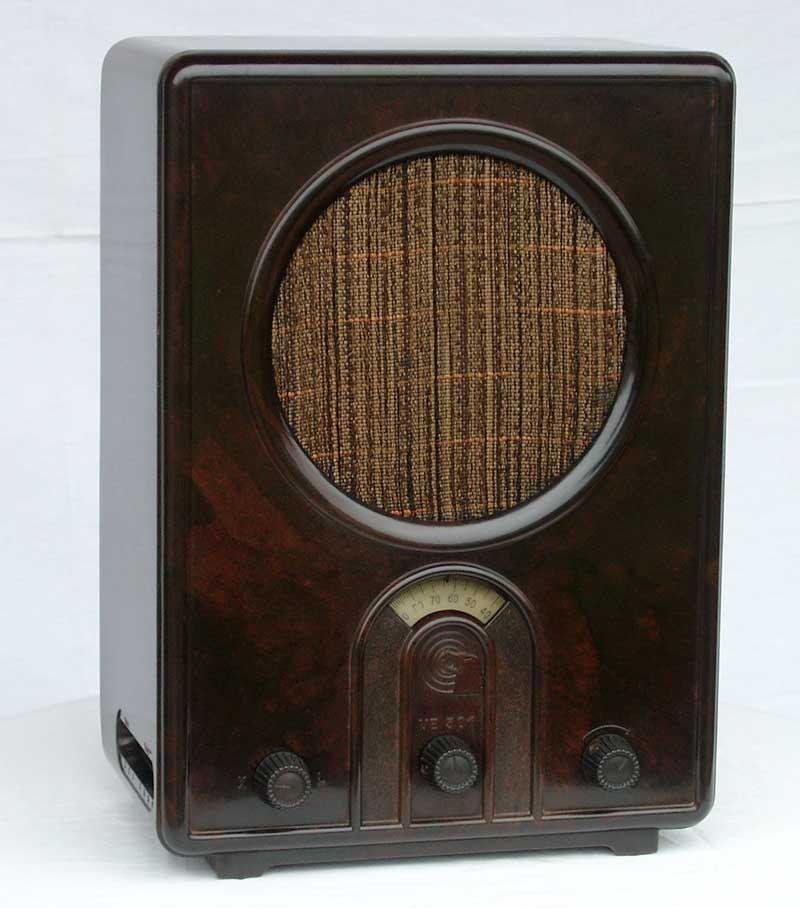
Volksempfänger VE301 - The distinctive Bakelite cabinet was designed by the architect and industrial designer Walter Maria Kersting.

The Volksempfänger (German: [ˈfɔlksʔɛmˌpfɛŋɐ], "people’s receiver") was a range of low-cost vacuum tube radio receivers produced in Germany during the 1930s. It was developed by engineer Otto Griessing at the request of Joseph Goebbels, the Reich Minister of Propaganda of the Nazi government.

Its purpose was to make radio reception technology affordable to the general public. Goebbels realized the great propaganda potential of this relatively new medium and thus considered the widespread availability of receivers highly important.

== History ==
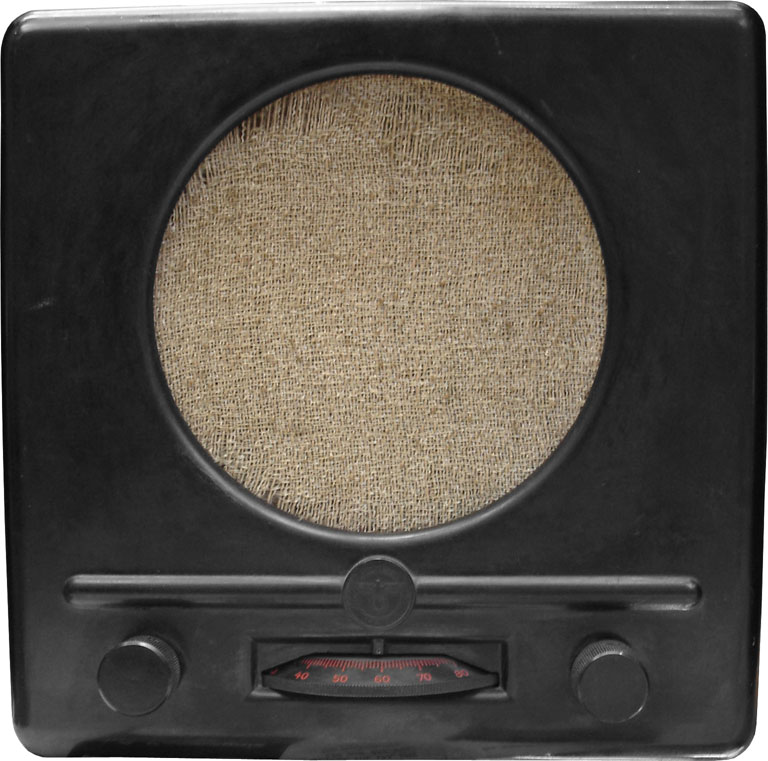
Deutscher Kleinempfänger, DKE 38 (built from 1938 to 1944)

The original Volksempfänger VE301 (Note: "VE301" is an abbreviation where the "VE" stands for "Volksempfänger" and the "301" refers to the date of 30 January 1933 – the day Hitler was appointed Germany's chancellor.) model was presented on August 18, 1933, at the 10. Große Deutsche Funkausstellung in Berlin. The VE301 was available at a readily affordable price of 76 ℛ︁ℳ︁ (equivalent to two weeks' average salary), and a cheaper 35 ℛ︁ℳ︁ model (only a little more than the average weekly wage of 32 ℛ︁ℳ︁, available on an installment plan to bring it within the budget of all German families), the DKE38 (sometimes called Goebbels-Schnauze – "Goebbels' snout" – by the general public) fitted with a multisection vacuum tube, was also later produced, along with a series of other models under the Volksempfänger, Gemeinschaftsempfänger, KdF (Kraft durch Freude), DKE (Deutscher Kleinempfänger), and other brands.

1936 Nazi propaganda poster, promoting the use of the Volksempfänger. The text can be translated as, "All of Germany hears the Führer with the People's Receiver".

The Volksempfänger was designed to be produced as cheaply as possible; as a consequence they generally lacked shortwave bands and did not follow the practice, common at the time, of marking the approximate dial positions of major European stations on its tuning scale. Only German and (after the 1938 annexation) Austrian stations were marked, and cheaper models listed only arbitrary numbers. Sensitivity to receive weak signals was limited, to reduce production costs further; so long as the set could receive Deutschlandsender and the local Reichssender, it was considered sensitive enough. However, foreign stations could be received after dark with an external antenna, particularly as stations, such as the BBC European service, increased their transmission power over the course of the war.

Listening to foreign stations became a criminal offence in Nazi Germany when the war began. In contrast, in some occupied territories, such as Poland, all radio listening by non-German citizens was outlawed (later in the war this prohibition was extended to a few other occupied countries coupled with mass seizures of radio sets). Penalties ranged from fines and confiscation of radios to, particularly later in the war, sentencing to a concentration camp or capital punishment. Nevertheless, such clandestine listening was widespread in many Nazi-occupied countries and (particularly later in the war) even Germany, itself. The Germans also attempted radio jamming of some enemy stations with limited success.

== Technical details ==
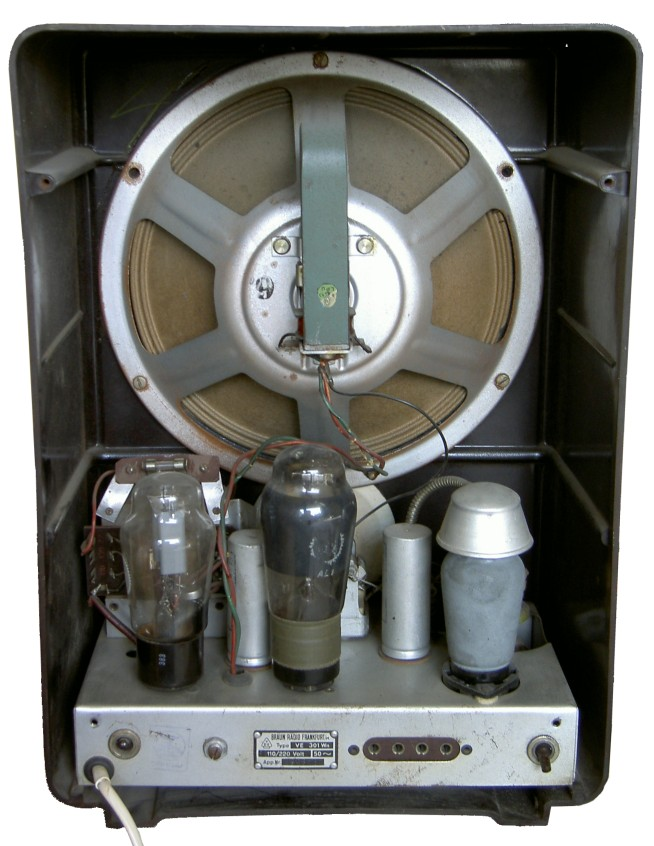
VE301 WN interior components

First introduced in 1933, the Volksempfänger Model VE301 used a regenerative circuit, an economical radio receiver design common during the 1920s. Three different VE301 models were produced to suit differing power supply requirements: batteries, alternating current (AC) mains, or direct current (DC) mains. Variations in AC line voltages were accommodated by moving a wire on the power transformer to select 110 volt, 130 volt, or 220 volt power sources. The set employed two or three vacuum tubes, depending on what kind of power source the radio was designed to operate from: the REN904/AF7 as the RF regenerative circuit, the RES 164 as the audio amplifier and the RGN354 rectifier for receivers designed to run on AC power.

The radio set was capable of reception on two bands: Langwelle (long wave) from 150 to 350 kilohertz, and Mittelwelle (medium wave) from 550 to 1700 kilohertz. On later models, the glass tuning dial was imprinted with the names of German and Austrian cities corresponding to the frequencies of broadcast stations located in them. Three antenna jacks were provided for antennas of differing lengths, used to optimize reception on the different frequency bands.

Volksempfänger models produced between 1933 and 1937 used an inexpensive metal reed type speaker. The 1938 models (VE301 Dyn) added an audio output transformer and featured a more modern electrodynamic loudspeaker.

== Legacy ==
The legacy of the Volksempfänger as a tool of propaganda is significant. Historian Oliver Rathkolb called it a "vital element of success" in spreading the Nazi ideology "which could not be ignored by the majority of the German population". According to media historian Alexander Badenoch, "Hitler's voice through the Volksempfänger is both a German and a Hollywood cliche for the intrusion of the 'distant' Nazi state into the (otherwise innocent) domestic sphere..." Today, historical exhibitions often use it as a "visual shorthand for Nazi propaganda".

Under the slogan "every national comrade a radio listener", Minister of Propaganda Joseph Goebbels' intention with the Volksempfänger was to double the number of radio listeners. Hitler's architect and Minister for Armaments and War Production, Albert Speer, said in his final speech at the Nuremberg trials:

Hitler's dictatorship differed in one fundamental point from all its predecessors in history. His was the first dictatorship in the present period of modern technical development, a dictatorship which made the complete use of all technical means for domination of its own country. Through technical devices like the radio and loudspeaker, 80 million people were deprived of independent thought. It was thereby possible to subject them to the will of one man...

== Utility receiver ==
The Volksempfänger "people's radio" concept has been compared to the Utility Radio or "Civilian Receiver" produced by Britain between 1944 and 1945. Unlike the Volksempfänger, the Utility Radio was produced primarily to remedy a shortage of consumer radio sets caused by the British radio industry's switch from civilian to military radio production. These Utility Radios followed a standardized and government approved design, and were built by a consortium of manufacturers using standard components.

== RFT Kolibri ==
A similar model of radio receiver was produced in East Germany in 1954/55 under the RFT/Stern brand called the "Kolibri" (EN: "Hummingbird") which sold for 50 marks and was very similar in cabinet styling to the Volksempfänger. A feature of the Kolibri design often misattributed to the Volksempfänger was that it was designed to receive only two (pre-tuned) stations. Sets without such limitations were also produced by RFT but were more expensive. Popularly derided as Rentnerradio (Pensioners radio) or Ulbricht-vogel (Ulbricht's Bird) production was discontinued in light of sluggish sales.

== Polish Ludowy Radio ==
In 1946 a small number of DKE38 and VE-301 "Ludowy" (People's) receivers were produced under the Zakłady Radiowe Diora brand at the formerly German held radio factory in Dzierżoniów, Poland. These were produced from materials leftover after the war and were similar to the Volksempfänger (with the Eagle/Swastika badge removed). Production of the sets ended when the stock of components was exhausted and the factory shifted to producing Polish designed sets. During the war there were Telefunken and Philips branded sets manufactured in occupied Poland with tuning limited to three preset stations these were only for sale to German citizens as Polish citizens and Jews were largely prohibited from owning radios.

== In popular culture ==
- The album Radio-Activity, released in 1975, by German electronic music pioneers Kraftwerk prominently features a Volksempfänger, of the DKE brand (model 38), on its cover.
- German band Welle: Erdball has also produced a song entitled "Volksempfänger VE-301", which first appeared on their Die Wunderwelt der Technik album of 2002.
- While living in Berlin in the 1970s, the American artist Edward Kienholz produced a series of works entitled Volksempfänger using the old radios, which at the time could be purchased cheaply at Berlin flea markets, a consequence of the large numbers that had been produced in the pre-war years.

== See also ==
- Censorship
- Freedom of information
- Propaganda
- Feindsender
- All American Five
- Volksflugzeug
- Linjesender

== Sources ==
- Diller, Ansgar (1983). "Der Volksempfänger. Propaganda- und Wirtschaftsfaktor". Mitteilungen des Studienkreises Rundfunk und Geschichte (in German). 9: 140–157.
- Hensle, Michael P. (2003). Rundfunkverbrechen. Das Hören von "Feindsendern" im Nationalsozialismus (in German). Berlin: Metropol. ISBN 3-936411-05-0.
- König, Wolfgang (2003). "Der Volksempfänger und die Radioindustrie. Ein Beitrag zum Verhältnis von Wirtschaft und Politik im Nationalsozialismus". Vierteljahreshefte für Sozial- und Wirtschaftsgeschichte (in German). 90: 269–289.
- König, Wolfgang (2003). "Mythen um den Volksempfänger. Revisionistische Untersuchungen zur nationalsozialistischen Rundfunkpolitik". Technikgeschichte (in German). 70 (2): 73–102. doi:10.5771/0040-117X-2003-2-73.
- König, Wolfgang (2004). Volkswagen, Volksempfänger, Volksgemeinschaft. "Volksprodukte" im Dritten Reich: Vom Scheitern einer nationalsozialistischen Konsumgesellschaft (in German). Paderborn: Ferdinand Schöningh. ISBN 3-506-71733-2.
- Latour, Conrad F. (1963). "Goebbels' "außerordentliche Rundfunkmaßnahmen" 1939–1942". Vierteljahrshefte für Zeitgeschichte (in German). 11: 418–435.
- Mühlenfeld, Daniel (2006). "Joseph Goebbels und die Grundlagen der NS-Rundfunkpolitik". Zeitschrift für Geschichtswissenschaft (in German). 54: 442–467.
- Schmidt, Uta C. (1999). "Der Volksempfänger. Tabernakel moderner Massenkultur". In Marßolek, Inge; Saldern, Adelheid von (eds.). Radiozeiten. Herrschaft, Alltag, Gesellschaft (1924–1960) (in German). Potsdam: Vlg. f. Berlin-Brandenburg. pp. 136–159. ISBN 3-932981-44-8.
- Steiner, Kilian J. L. (2005). Ortsempfänger, Volksfernseher und Optaphon. Entwicklung der deutschen Radio- und Fernsehindustrie und das Unternehmen Loewe 1923–1962 (in German). Essen: Klartext Vlg. ISBN 3-89861-492-1.
