= Pätzer Vordersee =

Lake in Germany

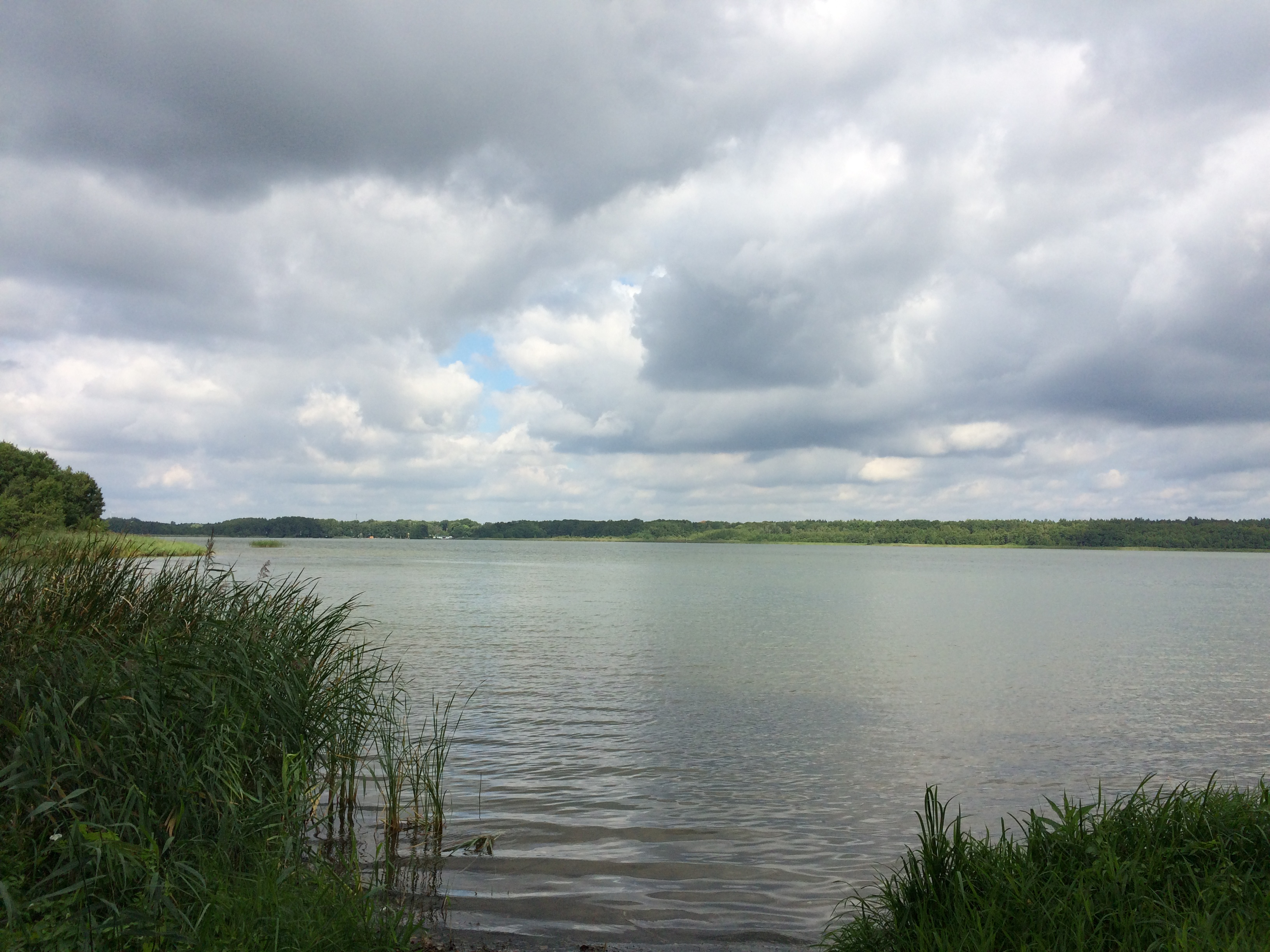

- Location within Brandenburg
- Location: Bestensee, Brandenburg
- Coordinates: 52°13′0″N 13°40′12″E
- Primary outflows: Glunze
- Basin countries: Germany
- Surface area: 1.7 km^{2} (0.66 sq mi)
- Max. depth: ca. 18 m (59 ft)
- Surface elevation: 34.4 m (113 ft)

Pätzer Vordersee is a lake in Bestensee, Brandenburg, Germany. At an elevation of 34.4 m, its surface area is 1.7 km^{2}.
