= Bestensee station =

Train station in Brandenburg, Germany

Bestensee
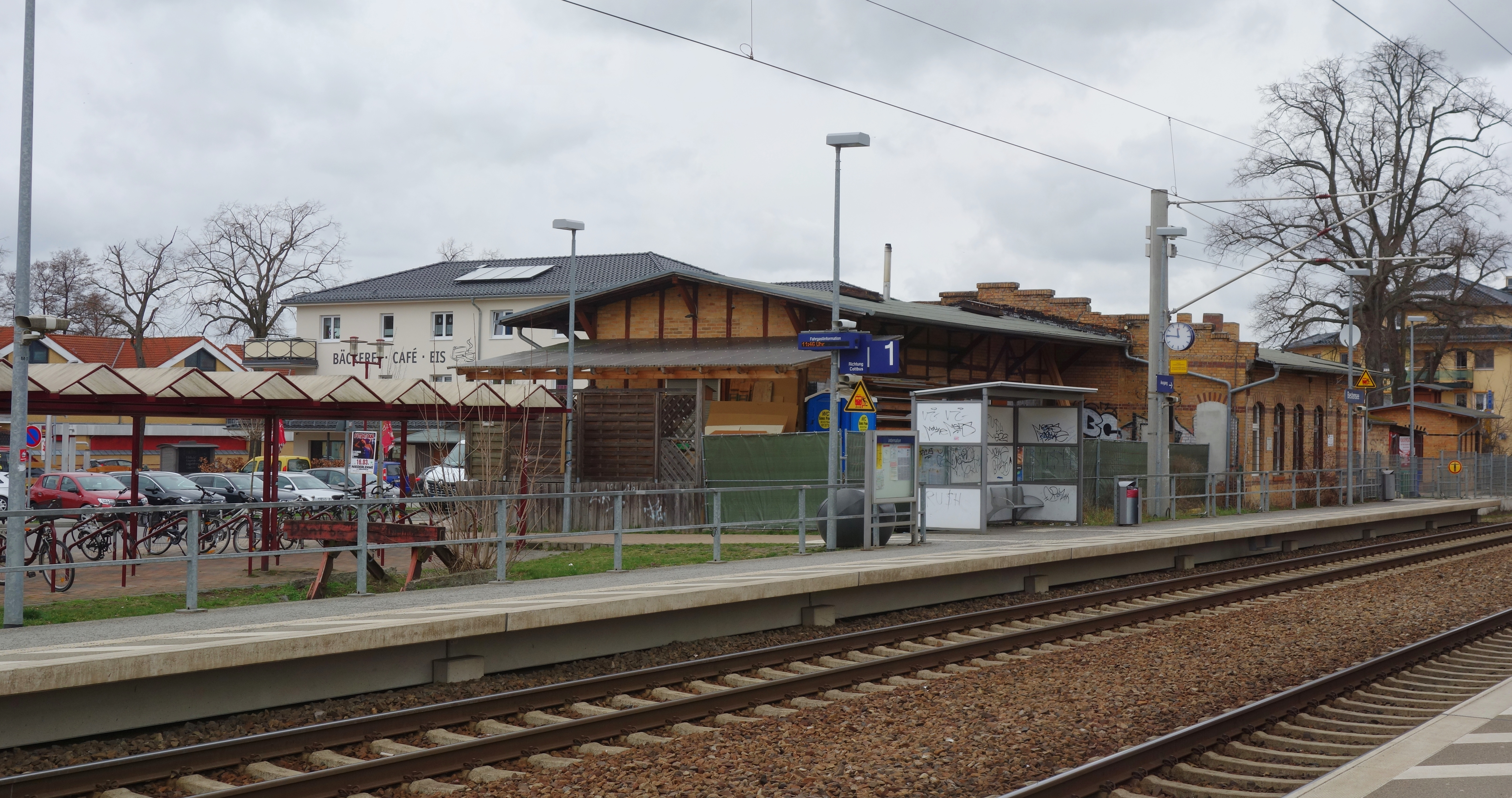
- 2019

General information
- Location: Am Bahnhof; 15741 Bestensee; Brandenburg; Germany
- Coordinates: 52.2415°N 13.6351°E
- Elevation: 36 m (118 ft)
- Owner: DB Netz
- Operator: DB Station&Service
- Lines: Berlin–Görlitz railway (KBS 202)
- Platforms: 2 side platforms
- Tracks: 2
- Train operators: DB Regio Nordost

Construction
- Parking: yes
- Cycle facilities: yes
- Accessible: yes

Other information
- Station code: 590
- DS100 code: BBST
- IBNR: 8011173
- Category: 6
- Fare zone: VBB: 6159
- Website: www.bahnhof.de

Services
| Preceding station | DB Regio Nordost | Following station |
|---|---|---|
| Zeesen towards Dessau Hbf | RE 7 | Groß Köris towards Senftenberg |
Location
- Location within Brandenburg Location within Germany Location within Europe

Bestensee station is a railway station in Bestensee, Brandenburg, Germany.
