= Otto Griessing =

German engineer

- Born: 19 January 1897; Munich, Bavaria, Germany
- Died: 11 November 1958; Überlingen, Baden-Württemberg, Germany
- Occupation: Electronics engineer

Otto Griessing (born 19 January 1897 in Munich – died 11 November 1958 in Überlingen) was a German electronics engineer. He became known following his design of the so-called Volksempfänger (people's receiver), one of the sets on display at the 10th German Radio Show (Internationale Funkausstellung Berlin) in August 1933. He designed the receiver at the request of Joseph Goebbels, the German Propaganda Minister. More Volksempfängers were manufactured in Germany between 1933 and 1945 than any other model. The budget-priced Deutsche Kleinempfänger (German small receiver) was also widely known as the Volksempfänger.

== Life ==
Son of a Bavarian NCO, Otto Griessing was educated in Munich, enlisting as a volunteer in 1914 and serving as a signaller. He reached the rank of lieutenant and saw active service on the eastern and western fronts. He was posted to the Near East and interned following the armistice with Turkey. From 1919 he studied at Würzburg Polytechnic, now the University of Applied Sciences Würzburg-Schweinfurt. Having an interest in radio technology, Griessing started work in Berlin with the firm, Erich F Huth, under the wing of its laboratory chief, Karl Rottgardt. A few years later he transferred to the regional broadcasting station at Munich, which he helped to develop. He was technical director of the private broadcaster ‘Deutsche Stunde’ (forerunner of the present Bayerischer Rundfunk) when this started its transmissions on 30 March 1924. Between January 1926 and August 1927, during the initial development stage, he was the head and technical director of a firm manufacturing communications equipment in Toblach, Italy.

From September 1927 he worked in Berlin-Schönenberg at Georg Seibt, soon being promoted to the post of chief designer. In the spring of 1933, at the request of Joseph Goebbels, he began work on the development of a reasonably priced but high-quality broadcast receiver. Competitors were the Berlin firms Blaupunkt (previously "Ideal Radio") and Telefunken. The selection committee opted for his Model VE 301. The design of the cabinet was principally the work of Walter Maria Kersting. The set received high praise at the 1933 radio show (Funkaustellung) and, at 76 ℛ︁ℳ︁, was half the price of an equivalent receiver; by the autumn of that year 200,000 sets had been sold. At the 16th Berlin Radio and TV Show, (Grosse Deutsche Funk-und Fernseh-Ausstellung Berlin) Griessing, wearing SA uniform, was awarded a prize of over 10,000 ℛ︁ℳ︁.

== Literature ==
- Kurt Jäger (Hg.): Lexikon der Elektrotechniker. Berlin; Offenbach: VDE-Verlag, 1996. ISBN 3-8007-2120-1 (in German)

The above is a translation based on the article in the German Wikipedia at de:Otto Griessing
