= AT Series =

Acer Inc AT Series includes a wide range of LED and LCD Tvs:

- Series AT58 LED designed by Pininfarina
- Series AT85: 42” and 32”
- Series AT26 LED: comes in four widescreen display sizes: 19”, 20”, 23”, and 32”
- LCD TVs in 26” and 32” format.

== Acer AT58 TV Led designed by Pininfarina ==
September 2010, at IFA Berlin, Acer Inc. presented a TV Led series designed by the Italian car designer Pininfarina. It comes in five widescreen display sizes: 20”, 23”(available in black-and-white version), 27”, 32” and 42”. Beside the 20” model with 1600x900 HD resolution, all others are Full HD 1080p. All series is equipped with InfiniContrast technology.
