= Zeesen station =

Railway station in Königs Wusterhausen, Germany

Zeesen
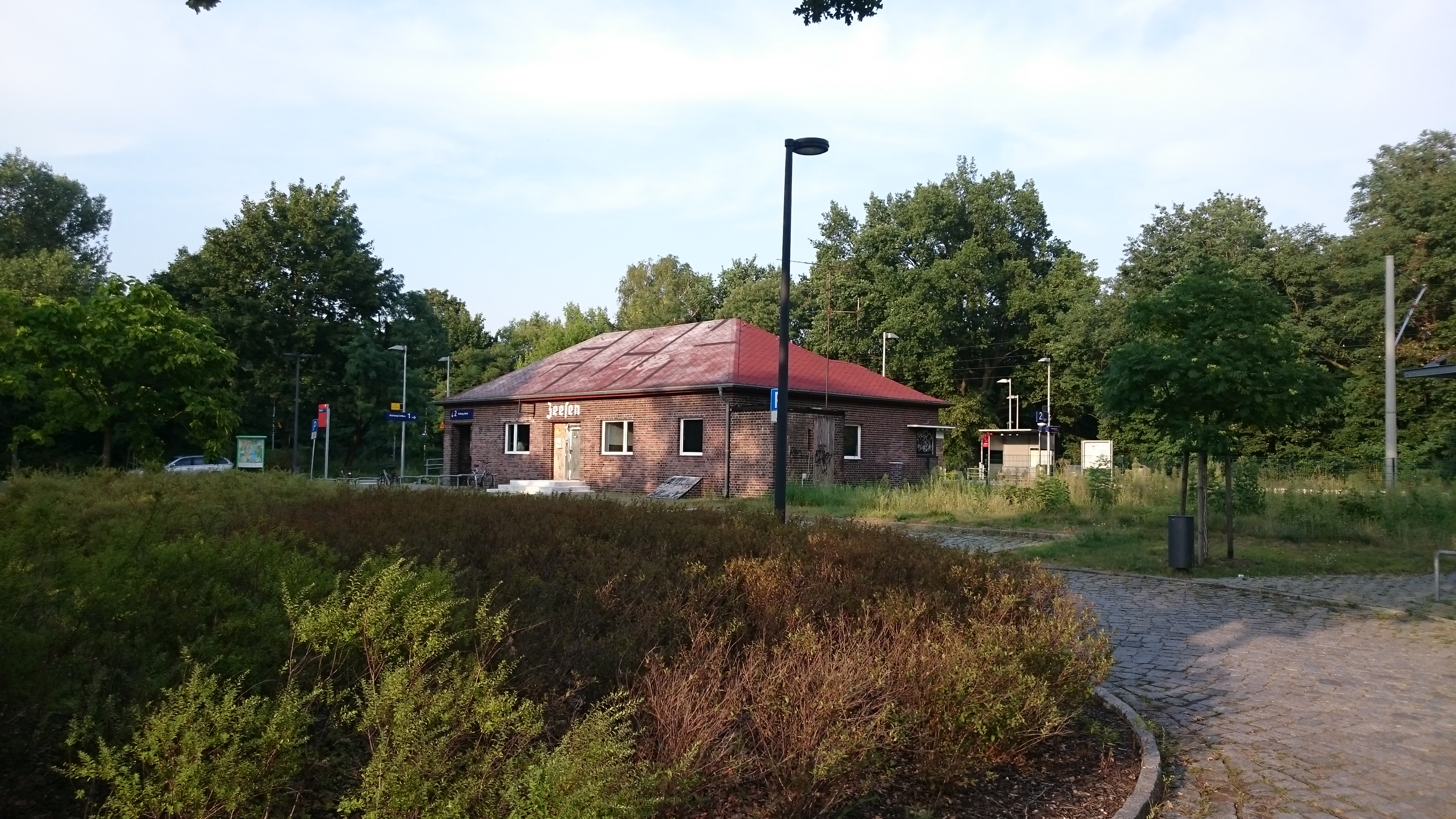
- 2015

General information
- Location: Karl-Liebknecht Straße 19; 15711 Königs Wusterhausen; Brandenburg; Germany
- Coordinates: 52.2649°N 13.6349°E
- Owner: DB Netz
- Operator: DB Station&Service
- Lines: Berlin–Görlitz railway (KBS 202)
- Platforms: 2 side platforms
- Tracks: 2
- Train operators: DB Regio Nordost

Other information
- Station code: 6979
- DS100 code: BZS
- IBNR: 8013376
- Category: 6
- Fare zone: VBB: Berlin C/6058
- Website: www.bahnhof.de

Services
Preceding station	DB Regio Nordost	Following station
Königs Wusterhausen towards Dessau Hbf	RE 7	Bestensee towards Senftenberg
Location
- Location within Brandenburg Location within Germany Location within Europe

Zeesen station is a railway station in the Zeesen district in the municipality of Königs Wusterhausen, located in the Dahme-Spreewald district in Brandenburg, Germany.
