= Heinrich Fehrentz =

Heinrich Hermann Fehrentz (26 June 1908 in Spiesen – 22 December 1943 in Stuttgart) was a German truck driver and sportsman, who was critical of the Nazi regime and listened to foreign radio stations, so called Feindsender. He was arrested, sentenced and executed at age 35.

== Life ==
Fehrentz came from a miner's family in Saarland, near the French border, and had nine siblings. Already at age 14 he had to work in a coal mine. He left the locksmith's training in Saarbrücken for economic reasons. Afterwards, he became a wandering labourer in Alsace and Luxembourg, working as a land-grabber and locksmith. At the end of the 1920s he moved to Heidelberg to live with his brother Hans. First he worked there as a shoemaker and roller shutter fitter. He was a member of the Red Sports, where he mostly did wrestling. After a motorcycle accident, he found a job as a truck driver and locksmith at the company Seppich. He married Gertrud née. Blum in 1938. The couple moved to an apartment in Dreikönigstraße and had two children.

After the defeat of Stalingrad the Nazi regime exacerbated their policies against any kind of resistance inside the Reich. Fehrentz was an outspoken anti-fascist and was introduced to some members of the illegal Communist Party by his brother. He did not join the Party but he regularly met some friends at the local pub "Zum Neckarstaden" for bowling and exchanging news they heard from acquaintances or from the radio programs of the Allied forces. The group was opposed to the Nazi regime. The circle was betrayed by an informer to the Gestapo. On 10 February 1943, seven persons were arrested, including Heinrich Fehrentz, and on 26 October 1943 they were sentenced by the Oberlandesgericht Stuttgart. The accusation was "preparation for high treason, undermining of military morale and listening to enemy radio stations". Six of his friends were sentenced to lengthy prison terms, while Heinrich Fehrentz was sentenced to death. Prosecutor Krebs has characterized him as a dangerous enemy of the Reich and as the leader of the group. Emilie Fehrentz remembers: "And then I was present there [at the trial]. They had already fixed everything in advance and then, they read the verdict directly from the print-outs. You can say, it was like a show trial."

On 22 December 1943 he was executed in Stuttgart.

== Remembrance ==
In 1950, an honorary grave site was established in Heidelberg's Bergfriedhof, the main cemetery of the town as a memorial to the resistance fighters of Heidelberg who were murdered by the Nazi regime. His name is engraved in a memorial stone there.

In 1974 the Mühlstraße in Heidelberg-Bergheim was renamed to Fehrentzstrasse. In March 2014 an addition plaque was mounted on the street sign remembering Heinrich Fehrentz.

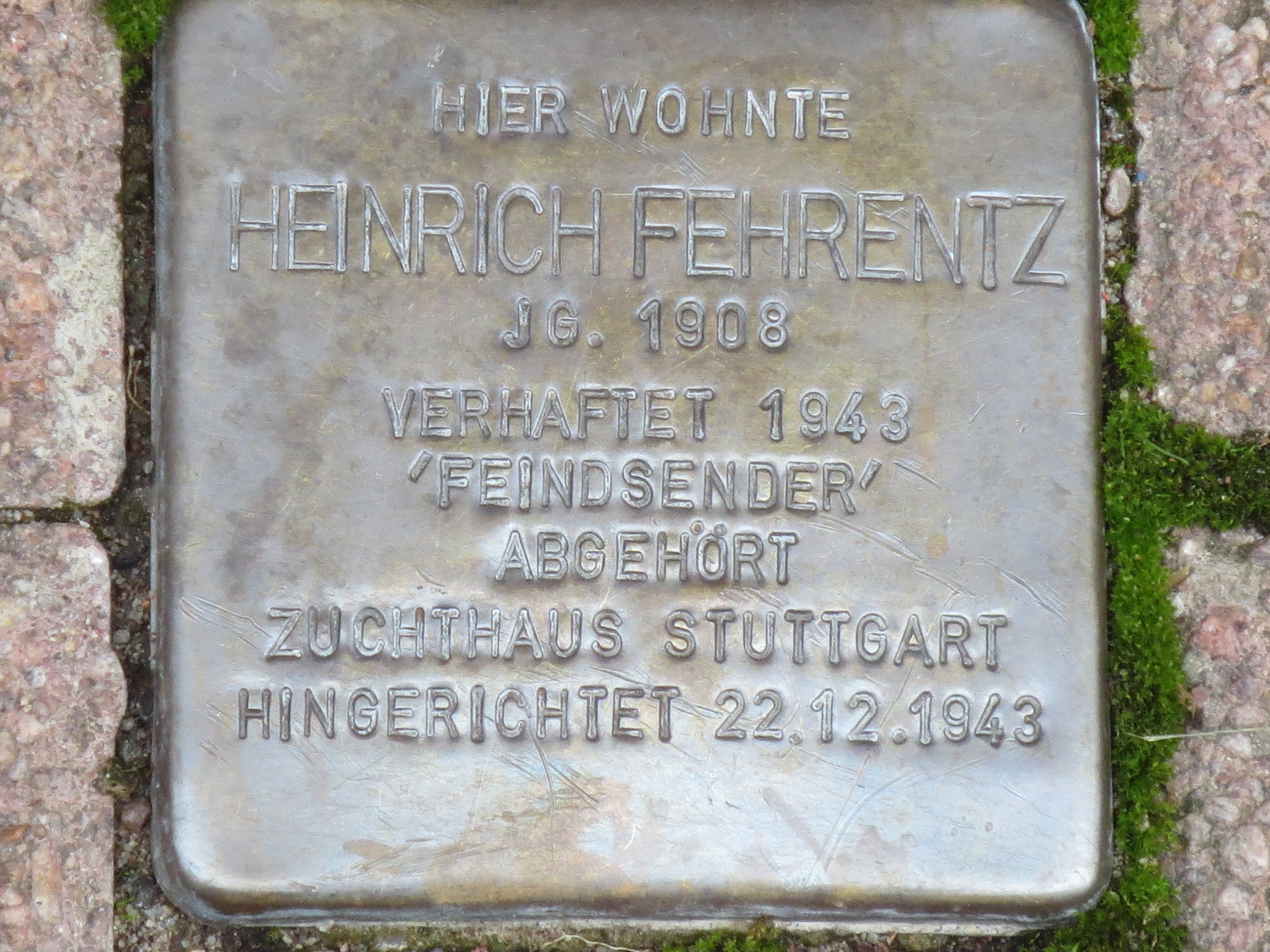
Stolperstein for Heinrich Fehrentz

On 12 October 2010 Gunter Demnig posed a Stolperstein in front of his last residence in Dreikönigstraße 15. The inscription says:

HERE LIVED
HEINRICH FEHRENTZ
BORN 1908
ARRESTED 1943
'ENEMY RADIO STATIONS'
LISTENED
PRISON STUTTGART
EXECUTED 22.12.1943
