= Technics Digital Link =

- RJ45 style socket
- Type: Digital audio connector

Production history
- Designer: Technics
- Designed: 2014
- Produced: announced for 2015
- Superseded: S/PDIF

General specifications
- Hot pluggable: unknown
- External: Yes
- Audio signal: Digital audio bitstream and control data.
- Cable: Twisted pair cable
- Pins: unknown
- Connector: RJ45 styled connector, exact specifications unknown

Data
- Width: 32-bit audio packets
- Bitrate: Audio: 192 kbit/s; Data: unknown
- Max. devices: 1
- Protocol: Serial

The Technics Digital Link interface was introduced by Panasonic at the Internationale Funkausstellung 2014 in Berlin as an integral part of the new "R1 Reference Class" of audio components. At the same time, Panasonic relaunched the Technics brand itself.

At the moment, only two devices are announced with this interface, the SE-R1 stereo power amplifier and the SU-R1 network audio control player/preamp.

== Design ==
As can be seen on the product images, The Technics Digital Link uses standard CAT7 STP networking cable.

The left and right channels of digital audio are transmitted on separate digital links and cables which is very different compared to S/PDIF, for example. The interface transmits digital audio data at a sample frequency of 192 kbit/s with 32-bit resolution together with some control data. The so called "VR control data" is used to adjust the output volume inside the power amp rather than in the pre-amplifier, which would be the case in analogue setups.

The connectors are clearly labeled as "IN" and "OUT", so the connections between the audio components will most likely be unidirectional point-to-point connections.
