= Deutschlandsender =

German national radio stations, 1926–1993

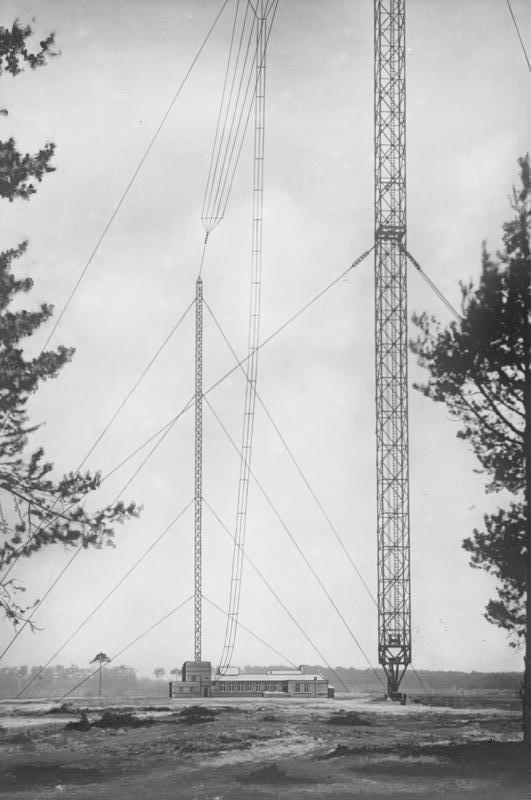
Königs Wusterhausen Central Tower, 1931

Deutschlandsender (German: [ˈdɔʏtʃlantˌzɛndɐ], Radio Germany), abbreviated DLS or DS, was one of the longest-established radio broadcasting stations in Germany. The name was used between 1926 and 1993 to denote a number of powerful stations designed to achieve a nationwide coverage.

Today’s Deutschlandradio emerged from the eventful history of the Deutschlandsender.

== History ==
=== Weimar Republic and Nazi Germany ===
Deutschlandsender I at first was the name of a powerful transmitter situated at Königs Wusterhausen in Brandenburg near Berlin, put into operation on 7 January 1926. The station was run by the Deutsche Welle GmbH, a commercial company – unconnected to today's similarly named international broadcaster – which had been set up by the Reichs-Rundfunk-Gesellschaft (RRG) network for nationally relaying programmes from Germany's nine regional broadcasting stations.

Broadcasting on long wave (182 kHz) from what was then a central position in the German Reich, the Deutschlandsender I transmitter enabled programmes from these stations to be heard throughout the country and its name was adopted as a station identification. The first programme broadcast was a concert from the RRG Berlin regional station, the Funk-Stunde AG. With effect from 1 January 1933, the Deutsche Welle company was renamed Deutschlandsender GmbH. Within a few weeks of this date the Nazi Ministry of Public Enlightenment and Propaganda was to take over direct control of all broadcasting in Germany in the course of the Gleichschaltung process.

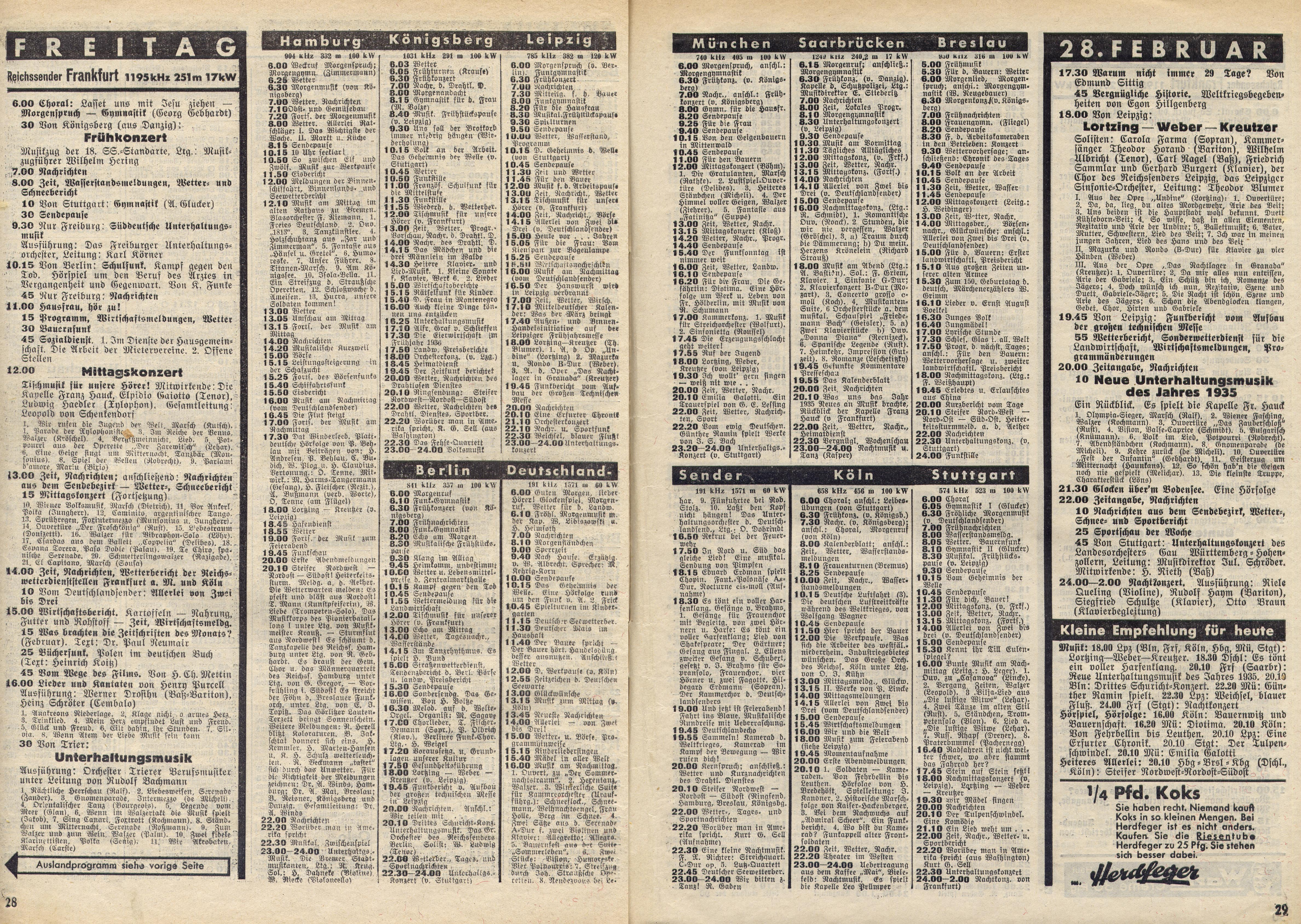
Radio magazine schedule for Friday, 28 February 1936; Reichssender plus: Deutschlandsender

A second transmitter, Deutschlandsender II, broadcasting from nearby Zeesen, had been opened on 20 December 1927. First the transmitter broadcast with 60 kW, and later 100 kW.

Also in Brandenburg, Deutschlandsender III, then with a height of 337 m (1,106 ft) the world's second largest structure after the Empire State Building, started its transmissions on 19 May 1939 from Herzberg. These transmitters were destroyed and dismantled by the Red Army in 1945.

During World War II the name Deutschlandsender was used to denote the long-wave service which covered most of Germany (and indeed Europe) while the regional medium-wave stations were normally identified as Reichssender [...] with the name of the city at or near which they were based.

=== East Germany ===
Stimme der DDR Voice of GDR
- East-Berlin; Germany
- Broadcast area: International, mainly West-Germany

Programming
- Language: German
- Format: News, speech

Ownership
- Owner: Council of Ministers of East Germany - Central Committee of SED

History
- First air date: 1 January 1971; 55 years ago

In the immediate post-war period, in 1947, a new long-wave radio transmitter, known as Deutschlandsender IV, was erected at Königs Wusterhausen. From 1 May 1949, the IV was dropped and the station became known as simply the Deutschlandsender programme of what was to become the Rundfunk der DDR broadcaster. The transmissions from the newly established German Democratic Republic (GDR) aimed at listeners in West Germany. The long-wave frequency used was 185 kHz and the station also broadcast via short wave.

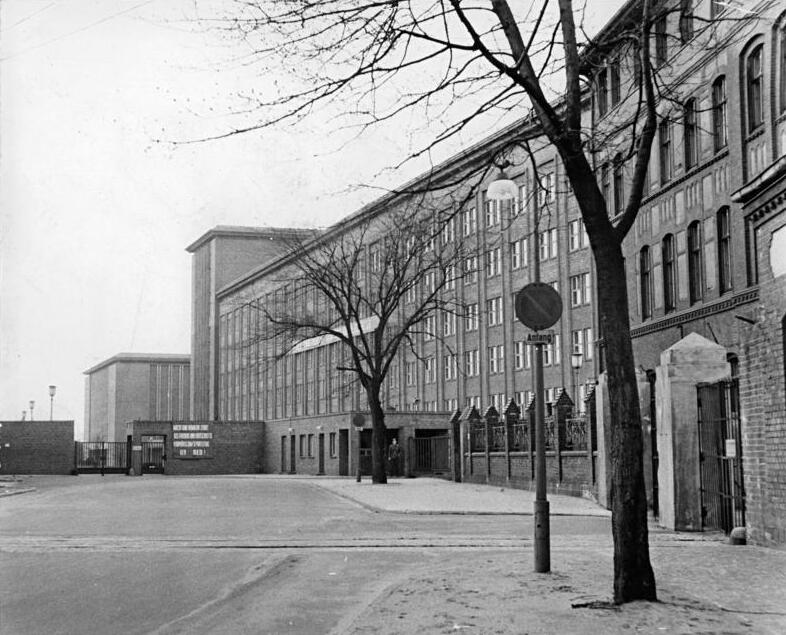
Funkhaus Nalepastraße, 1958

In 1952 the GDR government began a programme of centralisation, which included concentrating all broadcasting in East Berlin, and built a new studio centre in the Oberschöneweide district, known as the Funkhaus Nalepastraße. In September 1952, the short-wave Deutschlandsender service was renamed "Berlin I" and given a political programming emphasis. The long-wave Deutschlandsender service became "Berlin II", with an emphasis on culture and society. Both changes were, however, soon abandoned. In August 1953, the Deutschlandsender was relaunched as an "all-German" service, with FM coverage added.

A further reorganisation occurred when, in 1971, the State Broadcasting Committee of the GDR decided to merge the main station aimed at both sides of Berlin, Berliner Welle, with the Deutschlandsender to create Stimme der DDR ("Voice of the GDR"). This new information and news service began in November 1972. This program of Rundfunk der DDR was intended for German-speaking listeners outside the borders of the GDR - primarily for assembly workers and the GDR's seafarers, but also as a propaganda medium in "capitalist foreign countries". It had a high word content and offered political information, entertainment and culture.

=== German reunification ===
In 1989 the Peaceful Revolution in East Germany and the Fall of the Berlin Wall took place. In February 1990, the "Voice of the GDR" changed its name to Deutschlandsender. In May of the same year, it was combined with the existing national Radio DDR 2 to form Deutschlandsender Kultur, with headquarters at Funkhaus Nalepastraße.

Broadcasting started on 16 June 1990. As set out in the German Reunification Treaty of October 3, East German radio stations were to be closed, DS Kultur's operations therefore lacked a legal basis. Temporarily affiliated with the national ARD and ZDF public-service broadcasters, it was merged with the former West Berlin RIAS station to form Deutschlandradio Kultur with effect from 1 January 1994. With the Federal Republic's all-Germany service, Deutschlandfunk at Cologne, it today forms the Deutschlandradio broadcasting organisation, providing two nationwide radio stations for the reunified Germany.

== Literature ==
- Klaus Arnold (2002): Kalter Krieg im Äther. Der Deutschlandsender und die Westpropaganda der DDR. LIT Verlag Münster-Hamburg-London, 2002. ISBN 3-8258-6180-5

== See also ==
- Eastern Bloc information dissemination
- Rundfunk der DDR
