= Glunze =

River in Germany

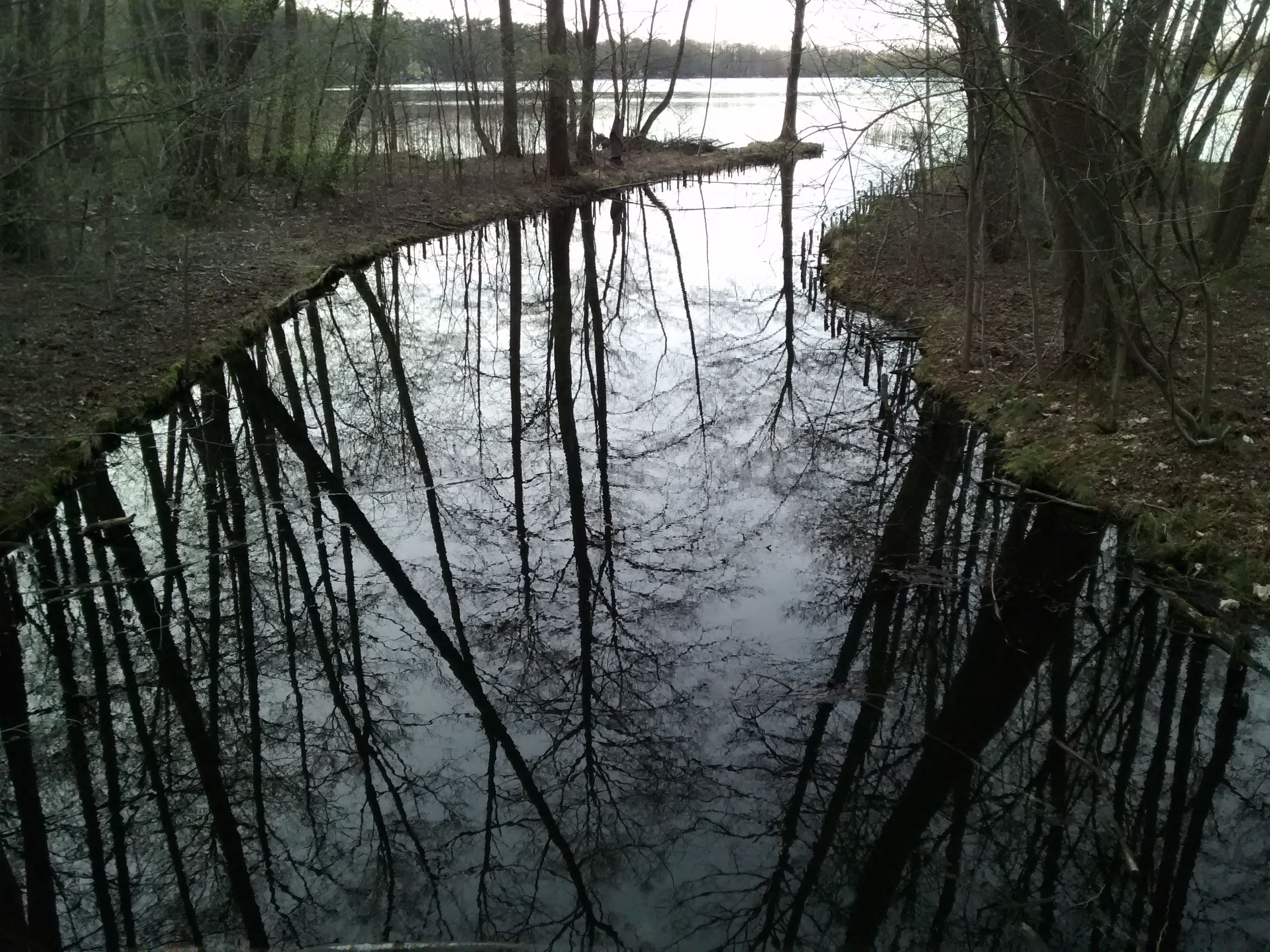

Location
- Country: Germany
- States: Brandenburg

Physical characteristics
- Mouth
  - location: Todnitzsee
  - coordinates: 52.2480°N 13.6492°E

Basin features
- Progression: Dahme→ Spree→ Havel→ Elbe→ North Sea

Glunze is a short river of Brandenburg, Germany. It discharges into the Todnitzsee, which is connected to the Dahme, near Bestensee.

== See also ==
- List of rivers of Brandenburg
