= Feindsender =

Broadcast stations prohibited in Nazi Germany

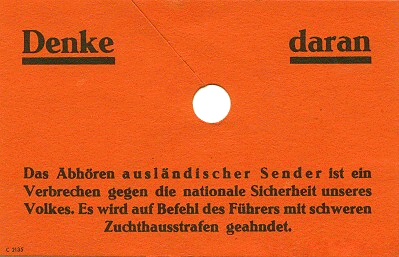
Paper tag attached to Volksempfänger devices as a warning that listening to foreign radio stations is punishable

Feindsender ("enemy radio station") was a term used in Nazi Germany to describe radio stations broadcasting from countries that were enemies of the state before and during World War II, such as the United Kingdom or the United States. It also referred to radio stations in Germany which broadcast anti-Nazi material. The term has not been in general use since the defeat of Nazi Germany.

== Background ==
As early as 1929, Soviet Radio Moscow broadcast German-language radio programs, mainly to support the agitation by the Communist Party of Germany against the Weimar government. After the Nazi Machtergreifung in 1933, anyone caught by the Gestapo listening to Radio Moscow could be sent to a concentration camp. The Nazis attempted to jam the broadcasts, this however also affected their own Deutschlandsender transmissions. In 1936 the Reich Ministry of Justice decreed that anyone listening to Radio Moscow could be prosecuted for treason. Secret Gestapo reports attested to the popularity of German-language programs aired by foreign radio stations.

Various new laws and prohibitions were put in place following the start of the second world war. One of the new laws, introduced on 1 September 1939 (the first day of the German Invasion of Poland), was the "regulation on extraordinary measures for radio-broadcasting" (German: Verordnung über außerordentliche Rundfunkmaßnahmen). The law prohibited deliberate listening to any foreign radio station (including those based in neutral countries such as Switzerland and even some nominally allied countries such as fascist Italy or francoist Spain) under threat of a prison sentence. Likewise all non-governmental radio transmissions were banned and the two-way radios used by German amateur radio operators were seized by the Reichspost.

== Persecution ==
The BBC came to be regarded as the main Feindsender, and listening to the German-language longwave program from London was punishable with imprisonment. Broadcasts like Thomas Mann's Listen, Germany! were still widely heard. Radio Moscow, Voice of America, Vatican Radio and the Swiss Beromünster radio station were other widely known Feindsender. Black propaganda broadcasters disguised as German armed forces stations like British Soldatensender Calais or Gustav Siegfried Eins and German pirate radio stations were also popular.

German citizens (Reichsbürger) denounced for violating the prohibition could expect to get off with warning for a first offence, or an arrest for a repeat offence, if they were listening to something relatively innocuous like comedy or jazz. However, spreading information considered demoralising was punished with incarceration, or even the death penalty. Death sentences were seldom based solely on radio listening but — in the cases of Helmuth Hübener and Walter Klingenbeck — rested on convictions for high treason or Wehrkraftzersetzung.

Estimates vary of how many listeners the Feindsender had. According to Sicherheitsdienst reports, a large-scale campaign in 1941, charging Nazi Blockleiter to visit the households in their area and attach warning paper tags to receiving sets, met widespread discontent. The author of Berlin Embassy, a bilingual American who traveled widely in Germany in 1939-40, estimated that 60 percent of Germans secretly listened to foreign broadcasts at low volume. Listening to foreign radio stations has been dubbed "the little man's resistance" because, together with being friendly to forced laborers (also a crime, and punished even more harshly), and taking detours to avoid passing a Nazi memorial where one would be forced to salute (the Viscardi Way or "Shirkers' Way" in Munich) it was very common and, later, could allow individuals to claim they had never really been a Nazi.

=== Outside Germany ===
Policy in Nazi occupied territories outside of Germany varied by time and place but there were instances of all radio listening by non-German citizens being outlawed backed up with mass seizures of radio sets.

== In popular culture ==
- The electro-pop-band Welle:Erdball wrote a song called "Feindsender 64.3".

== See also ==
- Volksempfanger
- Radio jamming
- Aspidistra (transmitter)
