= Kersting-Modellbauwerkstätten =

German automobile manufacturer

The Kersting-Modellbauwerstätten was a German motor manufacturer in Waging am See, Upper Bavaria. It was established in 1949 by the industrial designer and architect, Walter Maria Kersting and his sons Arno, Gerwald and Rainer. The company was initially involved with industrial design. In 1950 the small ‘Kleine Kersting’ motor car was launched with a plywood body without doors and a removable hardtop. It had three gears and was powered by a two-stroke DKW engine and was Professor Kersting's original 1920s design.

== Bibliography ==
- Ulrich Kubisch: Deutsche Automarken von A-Z. VF Verlagsgesellschaft, Mainz 1993, ISBN 3-926917-09-1

The above is a translation based on the article in the German Wikipedia at de:Kersting-Modellbauwerkstätten
