= Walter Maria Kersting =

German architect and industrial designer

- Born: 8 July 1889; Münster, North Rhine-Westphalia, Germany
- Died: 5 May 1970 (aged 80); Waging am See, Bavaria, Germany
- Occupations: Architect and industrial designer

Walter Maria Kersting (8 July 1889, in Münster – 5 May 1970, in Waging am See) was a German architect and industrial designer.

== Career ==
In 1928, he published the Bilderbuch für Kaufleute, (‘Picture book for business people’) a publicity handbook containing examples of catalogues, posters and packaging designs which had been created by Kersting and his wife in a plain and functional style. From 1927 to 1932 he was Professor of Artistic and Technical Design at the Kölner Werkschulen. With his students, Kersting designed the bakelite cabinet for the radio receiver, Volksempfänger model VE 301, which was launched at the 1933 Berlin Radio Show and which, on account of its striking design and the number of units sold, would become an icon of the Nazi period. After the Second World War, he and his sons set up Kersting-Modellbauwerkstätten GmbH, a motor manufacturing company in Waging am See, Upper Bavaria. In 1964 examples of his work were shown at ‘documenta III’, an exhibition of modern German art and design, in Kassel.
