= Zeesen short-wave transmitter (1931) =

Coordinates: 52°16′31″N 13°37′25″E

The Zeesen short-wave transmitter was a 70-metre-high shortwave radio transmission mast constructed at Zeesen in Germany in 1931. Consisting of a lattice tower of pitch pine timbers, it was one of Germany's first short-wave broadcasting transmitters. It was equipped with four transmitting arms, at 90-degree separation, surmounted by two omnidirectional aerials. In 1939, the wooden tower was replaced by a 70-metre high steel mast with a single omnidirectional aerial. This mast was dismantled, together with all the Zeesen transmitters, in 1945.

== See also ==
- Deutschlandsender Zeesen
