= Königs Wusterhausen Central Tower =

Coordinates: 52.304167°N 13.611111°E

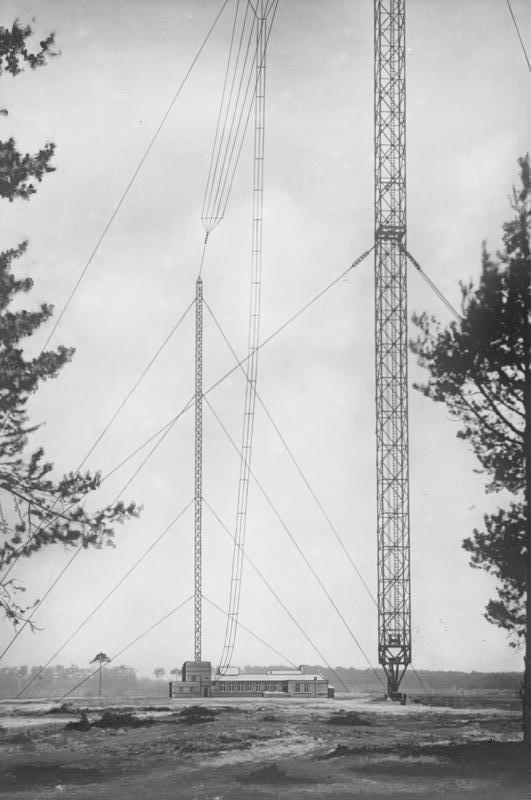

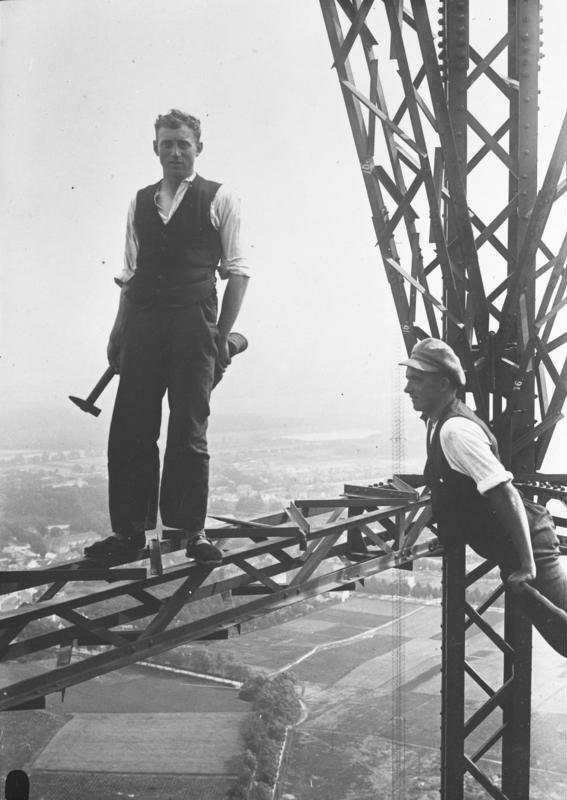
Checking the radio transmitter tower, 1930

Königs Wusterhausen coat of arms

Königs Wusterhausen Central Tower was a 243 m (797 ft), freestanding steel framework tower on the Funkerberg of Königs Wusterhausen, Germany. The tower, with its unique triangular cross section, was built from 1924 to 1925. The tower collapsed during the storm Quimburga on 13 November 1972.

== See also ==
- Lattice tower
- List of towers
- List of famous transmission sites
