= Deutschlandsender Herzberg/Elster =

Longwave transmitter in Germany

Coordinates: 51°43′00″N 13°15′51″E

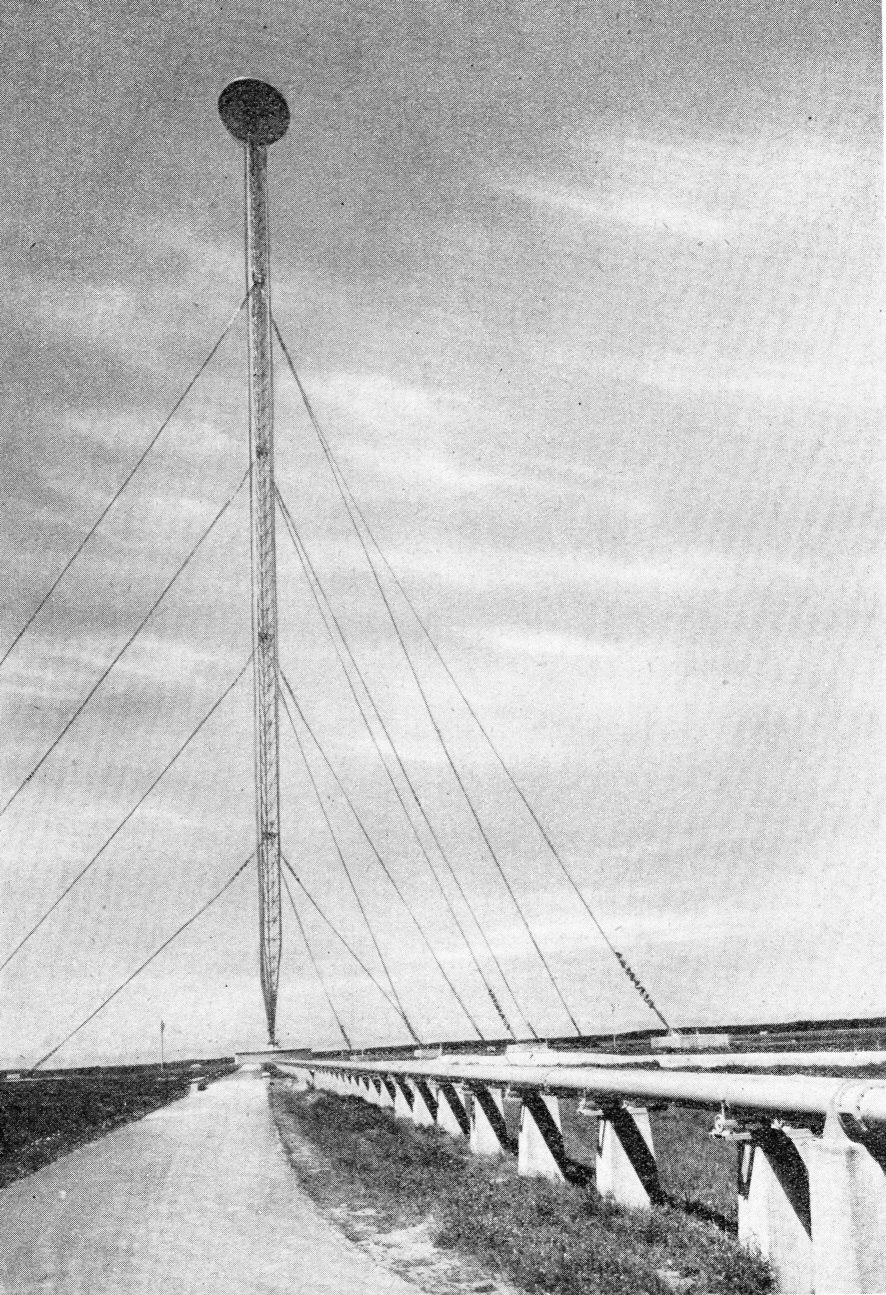
Mast in 1940

The Deutschlandsender III was a 500 kilowatt longwave transmitter, erected in 1938/39 near Herzberg, Brandenburg in Germany. Used for the Deutschlandsender radio broadcasts, the guyed mast reaching a height of 337 metres (1,106 feet) was the tallest construction in Europe and the second tallest in the world.

== Construction ==
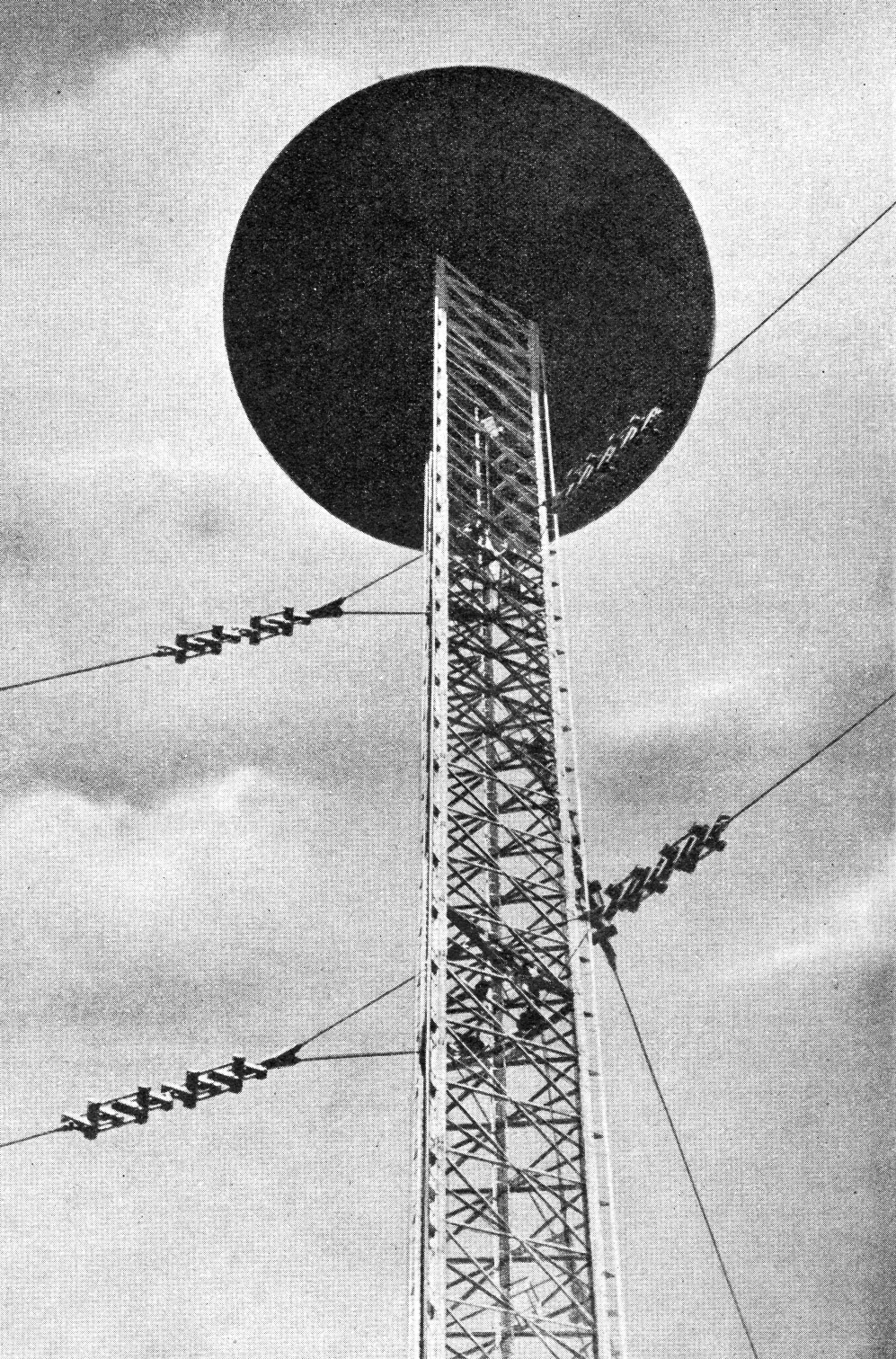
Mast head

The Deutschlandsender III used a 325 m (1,066 ft) tall guyed steel lattice mast of triangular cross section. This was used as a mast radiator and was therefore mounted on a 0.75 m (2.5 ft) high steatite insulator. At the top of the mast was a lens-like electrical lengthening structure with a diameter of 25 m (82 ft) and a height of 4 m (13 ft).

Because the mast was under high voltage during transmission, the aircraft warning lighting was realized in a very unconventional manner. On small poles near the mast multiple rotating searchlights were mounted which illuminated the lens-like structure on the top.

It was planned to expand the facility to a circle group antenna. Therefore, ten 275 m (902 ft) tall masts should be built on a circle with a diameter of 1,425 m (4,675 ft) around the central mast. In 1944 construction of a backup antenna in form of a triangle antenna, carried by three 150 m (490 ft) tall masts, forming a triangle with 210 m (690 ft) sidelength, started on the location of the planned mast No. 9. This antenna could not be completed as a result of the war.

On 21 April 1945 the transmitter was severely damaged by Allied bombing. The mast remained unimpaired, but it was dismantled by the Soviet occupation troops, a task that lasted from July 1946 to 23 December 1947. The other parts of the facility were dismantled in 1959, when waterworks were built on the former station area. Nevertheless, there are still some remnants of the base visible at the location.

It is unknown what happened to the mast after it was dismantled. It is sometimes claimed that it was rebuilt in Ukraine, as "Kiev" was scrawled on the containers the components were transported in.

== See also ==
- List of masts
