= Cyclone Quimburga =

1972 European windstorm

Meteorological history
- Formed: 11 November 1972
- Dissipated: Unknown

European windstorm Extratropical cyclone
- Highest gusts: 245 km/h (152 mph)
- Lowest pressure: 953 hPa (28.1 inHg)

Overall effects
- Casualties: 54
- Areas affected: Newfoundland, British Isles, France, Germany, Netherlands, Belgium, Italy, Switzerland, Austria, Denmark, Poland

Cyclone Quimburga, also referred to as the Lower Saxony Storm, was a deadly European windstorm that struck northern and central Europe between 12 and 14 November, 1972. The storm has been described as one of the most devastating storm events during the 20th century.

The storm developed over the UK where it caused some localised damage in the south before moving across the North Sea where it underwent explosive cyclogenesis dropping from 969 hPa to 953 hPa. This development was fueled by the contrast between cold air in the parent low and the warm water of the North Sea. The storm brought wind gusts of over 35 metres per second (130 km/h) to large areas of the Netherlands, with gusts over 40 m/s (140 km/h) across northern Germany. The greatest damage was reported across the German state of Lower Saxony, after which it is known in German as the Lower Saxony storm.

The storm destroyed the Königs Wusterhausen Central Tower, a 243 m (797 ft) communications tower to the southwest of Berlin and the church steeple in Berlin-Friedrichshagen.

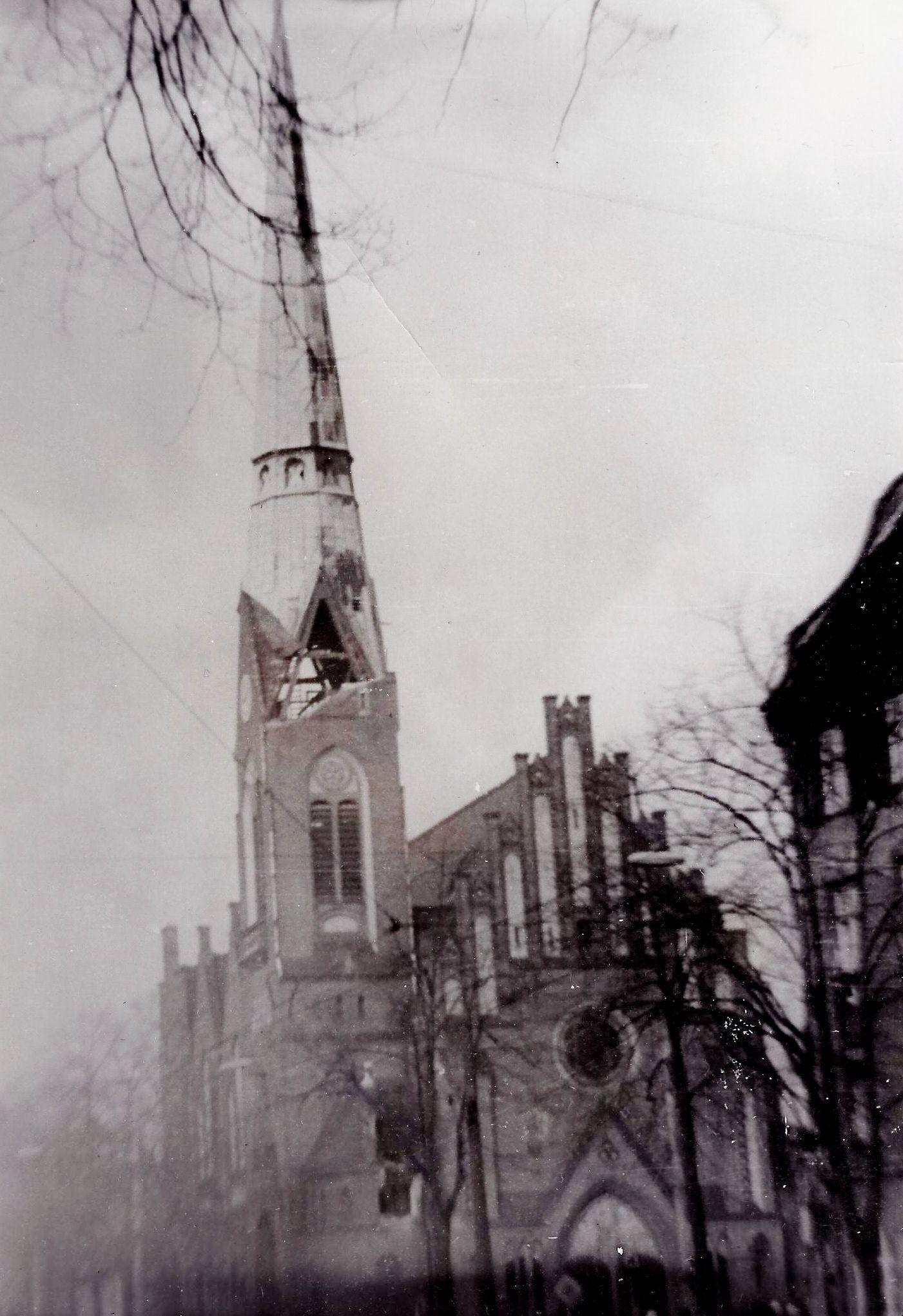
Damaged steeple of St. Christopher Church in Berlin-Friedrichshagen (Germany)

The courtyard of the Royal Netherlands Meteorological Institute headquarters in De Bilt features a representation of the pressure map of the Quimburga storm.
