= Hans Bredow =

German politician (1879–1959)

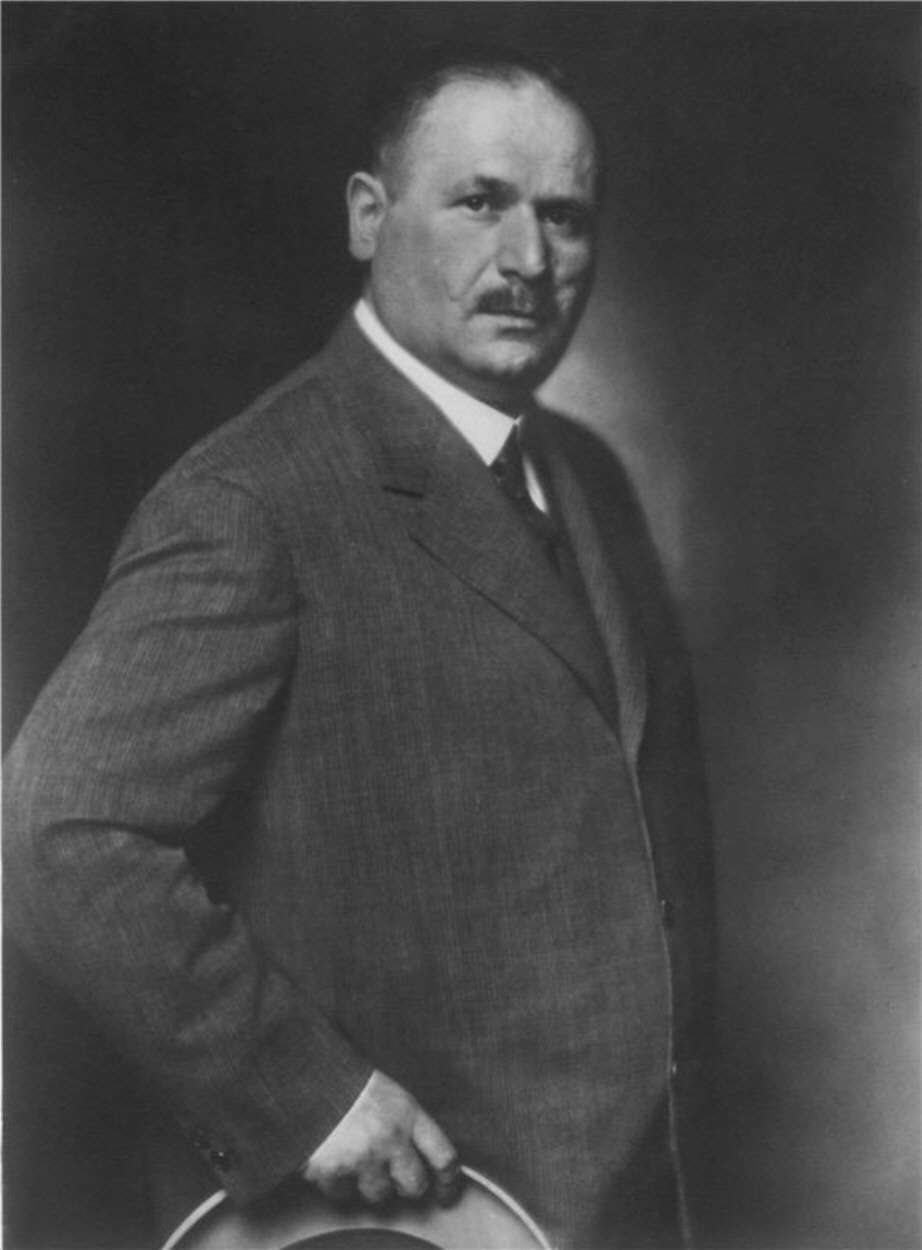
- Hans Bredow (1922)
- Born: 26 November 1879; Schlawe, Germany
- Died: 9 January 1959 (aged 79); Wiesbaden, West Germany
- Occupations: electrical engineer, radio frequency technician

Hans Bredow (26 November 1879 – 9 January 1959) was a German radio broadcasting pioneer and the first chairman of Weimar Germany's National broadcasting service. He is regarded as the "father of German broadcasting".

== Biography ==
Bredow was born in Schlawe, Pomerania, German Empire (now Sławno, Poland). His mother died in his early childhood and the family moved to Rendsburg in 1889. He began to study electrical engineering in Köthen in 1900 and started to work for AEG in Riga after completing his studies.

In 1904 he began to work for the "Gesellschaft für drahtlose Telegraphie m.b.H." (Company for Wireless Telegraphy Ltd.), the later Telefunken, and was sent to Saint Petersburg. After the outbreak of the Russo-Japanese War he acquired a contract for the radio equipment of the Russian Pacific squadron. He was involved in the planning of a Telefunken worldwide transmitting system and the construction of the Nauen Transmitter Station, which provided wireless communication with the United States via the Sayville Transmitter station and with the German colonies like the Kamina Transmitter in Togo.

In 1908 Bredow became executive director of Telefunken in Berlin. He volunteered for the German signal corps in World War I and organized an entertainment program at the Western Front by using military radio equipment.

In 1919 he became the department head and director of the newly founded Department for Wireless Telegraphy in the Reichspostministerium (Ministry of Posts), the central authority for the entire German radio communications in the Weimar Republic. On 1 April 1921 Bredow was appointed State Secretary for telecommunications.

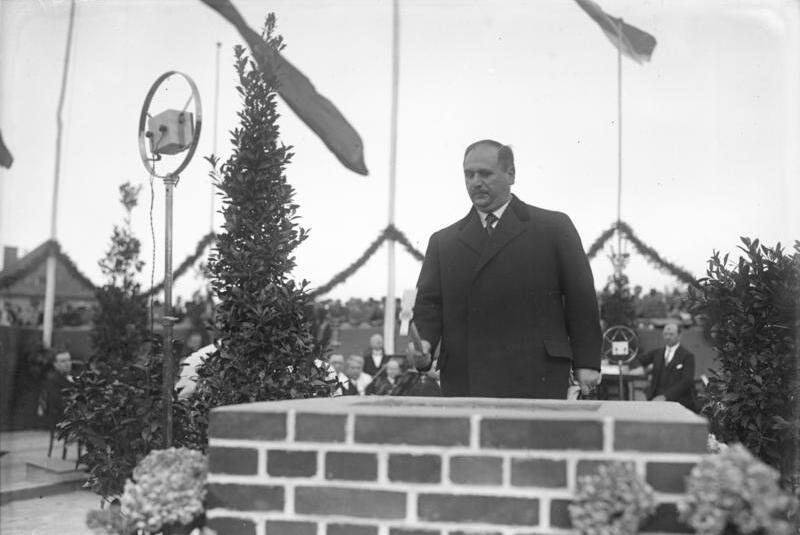
Hans Bredow laying the first stone of the Haus des Rundfunks in Berlin, 1929

On 16 November 1919 Bredow gave a speech about his vision of a nationwide wireless transmission of speech and music at Berlin's Urania, and in September 1923 the first German public broadcasting transmitter started operating in Berlin. In June 1926 Bredow left the Post administration and became chairman of the administrative board of the Reichs-Rundfunk-Gesellschaft (National Broadcasting Corporation), the federation of broadcasting companies in Germany.

On 30 January 1933, the day of the Machtergreifung of the Nazis in Germany, Bredow submitted his resignation and was replaced by August Kruckow on 15 February 1933. Within the following month several employees of the Reichs-Rundfunk-Gesellschaft were arrested, and subsequently interned in the Oranienburg concentration camp. Bredow protested against these arrests in several telegrams addressed to President Paul von Hindenburg, Hermann Göring, Franz von Papen and Hitler himself.

On 9 August 1933 Bredow sent a telegram to Hitler requesting the release of his former co-workers and explicitly asked to be treated like his colleagues in case they were kept in custody. Bredow was arrested on 25 October and kept in pretrial detention for 15 months. In a show trial he was accused of corruption; the initial sentence was revoked by the Reichsgericht in 1938. Bredow retired in 1939 and established a historical radio archive in Wiesbaden, which would become the predecessor of the German Broadcasting Archive.

After World War II, the Allies appointed him as the Regierungspräsident of the Wiesbaden region (May–September 1945). From 1945 to 1953 Bredow was chairman of the supervisory board of the Buderus ironworks and the "Edelstahlwerke Röchling-Buderus" and a member of the supervisory board of Philipp Holzmann AG. Bredow made several proposals for the restructuring of broadcasting in Germany and was chairman of the administrative board of the Hessian Broadcasting Company from 1949 to 1951.

Bredow died on 9 January 1959 in Wiesbaden.

== Awards ==
- Knight Commander's Cross of the Order of Merit of the Federal Republic of Germany
