= IFA Berlin =

Trade exhibition in Germany

IFA

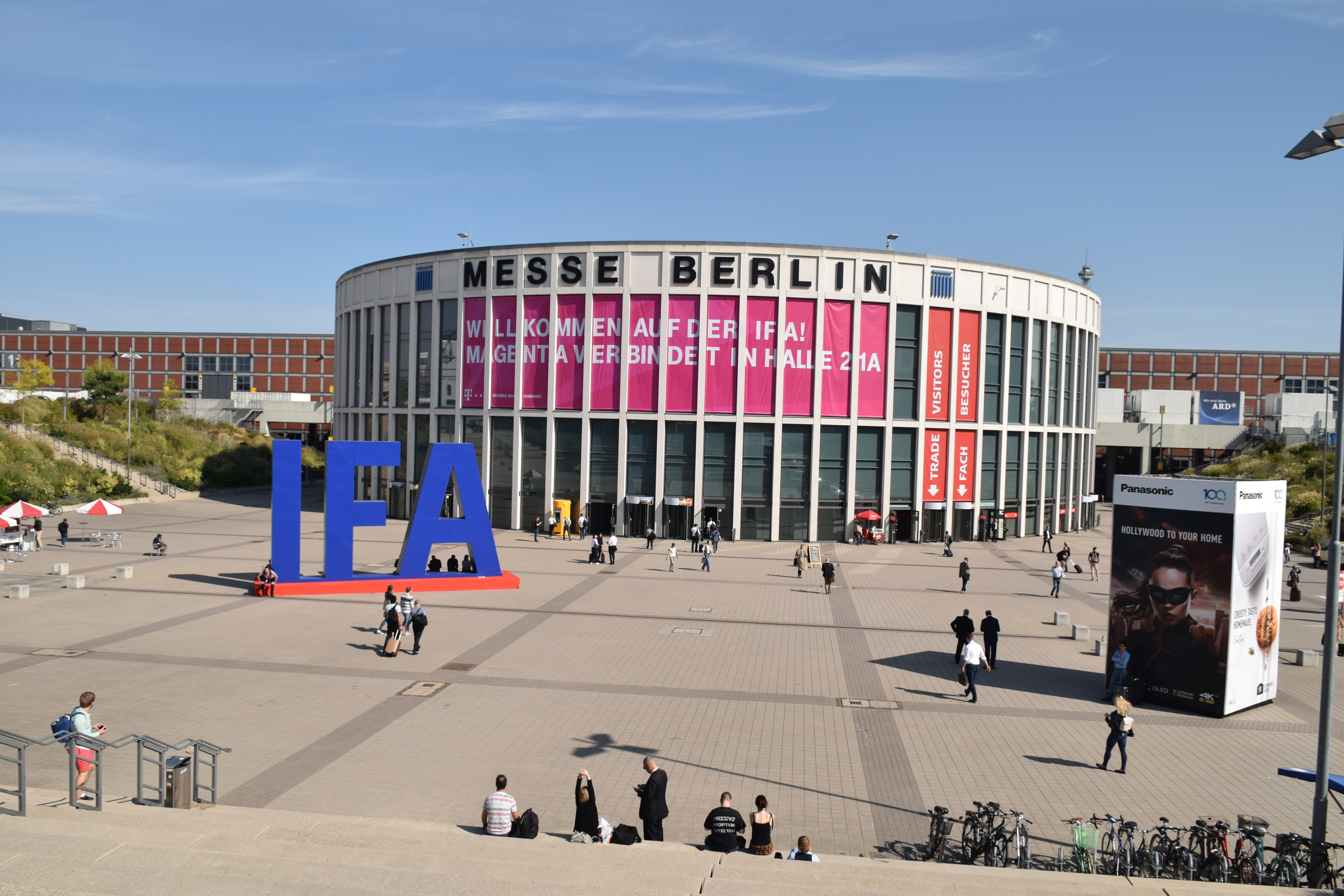
- Southern entrance to Berlin's fair ground during the IFA 2018
- Genre: Consumer electronics
- Date: 1924
- Begins: 1924
- Venue: Messe Berlin
- Country: Germany
- Founder: Messe Berlin GmbH
- Website: ifa-berlin.com

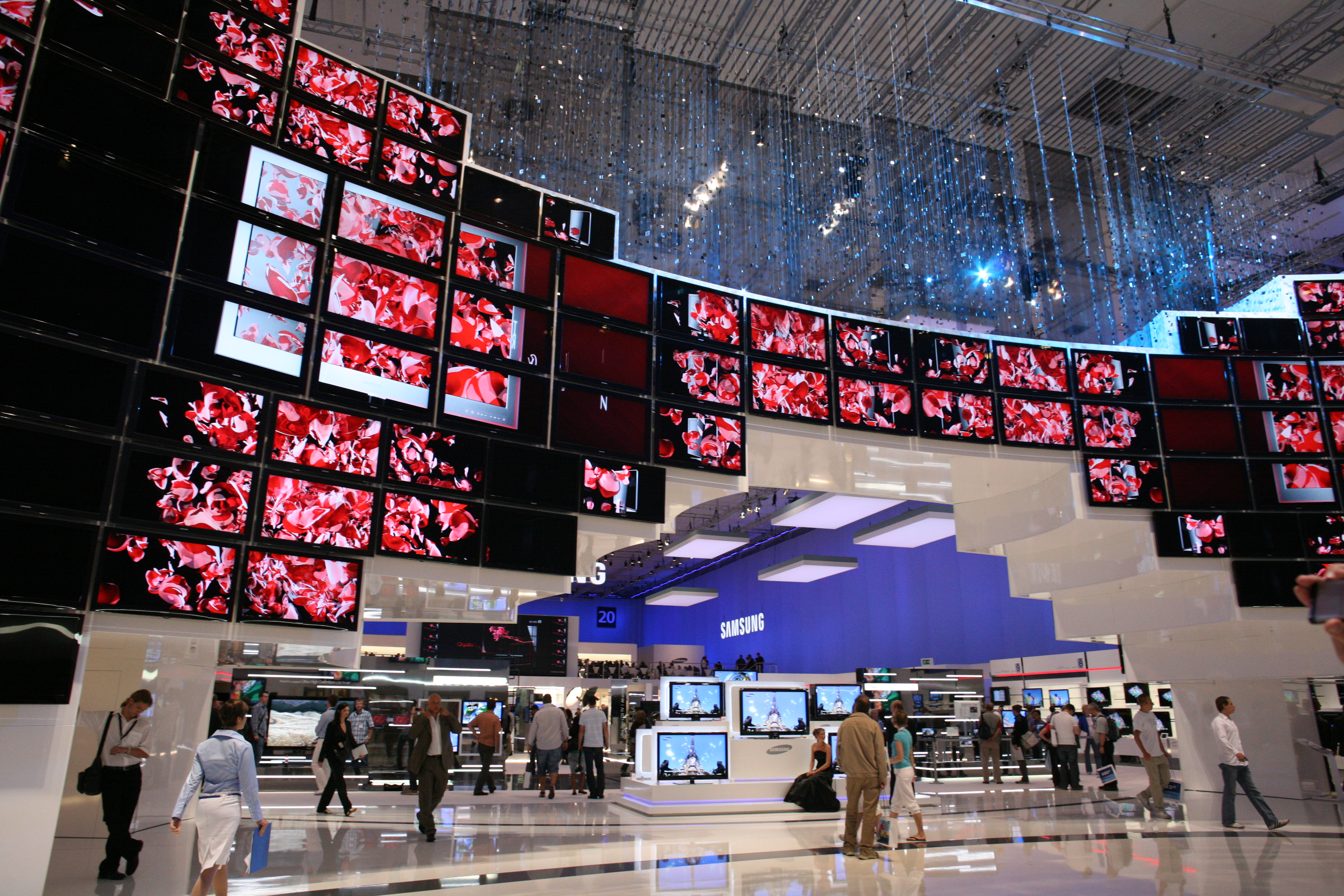
Samsung booth at IFA, 2008

The IFA (/ˈifɑː/ EE-fah), until 2004 the Internationale Funkausstellung Berlin ("International radio exhibition Berlin", a.k.a. "Berlin Radio Show", since 2025 as backronym Innovation for All), is one of the oldest industrial exhibitions in Germany.

Between 1924 and 1939 it was an annual event, but from 1950 it was held every other year until 2005. Since then it has become an annual event again, held in September. Today it is one of the world's leading trade shows for consumer electronics and home appliances.

It offers the opportunity to exhibitors to present their latest products and developments to the general public. As a result of daily reporting in almost all the German media, the radio exhibition and the showcased technology receive a large amount of attention around the globe. In the course of its history, many world innovations were first seen at the exhibition.

As of 2015 IFA is "Europe's biggest tech show". 245,000 visitors and 1,645 exhibitors attended IFA 2015.

== History ==
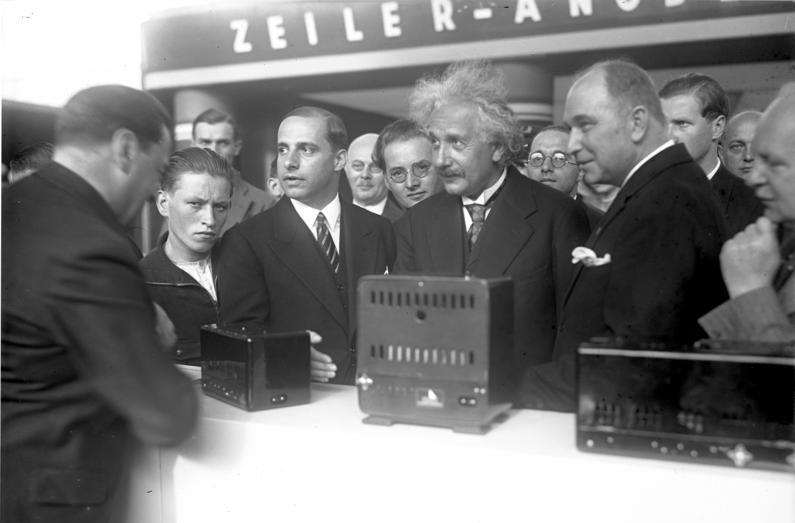
Einstein opens the IFA in 1930.

German physicist and inventor Manfred von Ardenne gave the world's first public demonstration of a fully electronic television system using a cathode-ray tube for both transmission (using flying-spot image scans, not a camera) and reception, at the 1931 show.

In 1933 the Volksempfänger (VE 301 W), a Nazi-sponsored radio receiver design, was introduced. Ordered by Joseph Goebbels, designed by Otto Griessing, sold by Gustav Seibt, it was presented at the tenth Berliner Funkausstellung on 18 August 1933, its price fixed at 76 Reichsmark (RM). 100,000 units were sold during the exhibition.

In 1938 the DKE 38 (Deutscher Kleinempfänger 38, i.e. German miniature receiver 1938) followed, the price fixed at 35 RM.

AEG, founded in 1883 by Emil Rathenau, showed the first practical audio tape recorder, the Magnetophon K1, at the August 1935 show.

In 1939 the exhibition was called Grosse Deutsche Funk- und Fernseh-Ausstellung (Great German Radio and Television Exhibition). The Einheits-Fernseh-Empfänger E1, a TV set designed to be affordable for everybody, was introduced. Plans for large-scale manufacture were thwarted by the outbreak of World War II. Color TV was also introduced (a prototype), based on an invention by Werner Flechsig (cf. shadow mask).

Multinational Dutch electronics corporation Philips introduced the compact audio cassette medium for audio storage and the first cassette recorder (the Philips EL3300), developed by ir. Lou Ottens and his team at the Philips factory in Hasselt, at the 1963 show, on Friday 30 August. Due to global pandemic, IFA Berlin was closed in 2020 and 2021. It was open again on September 2, 2022.

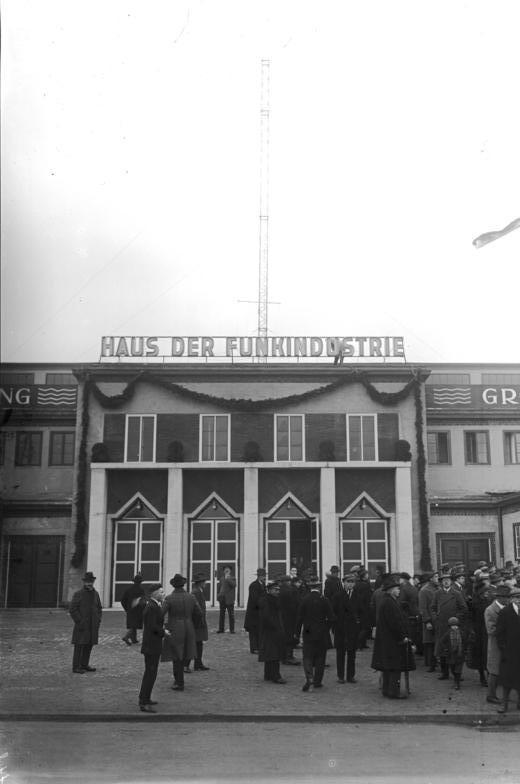
Main entrance and opening of exhibition in 1924

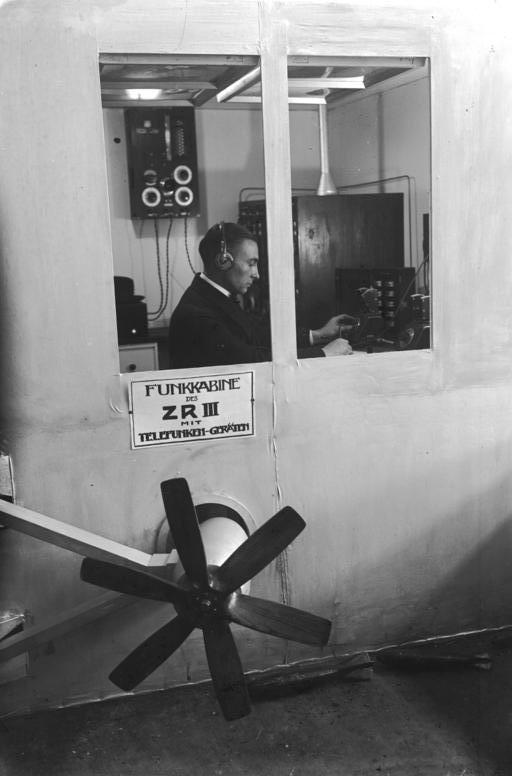
Radio shack of the ZR-3 (model)

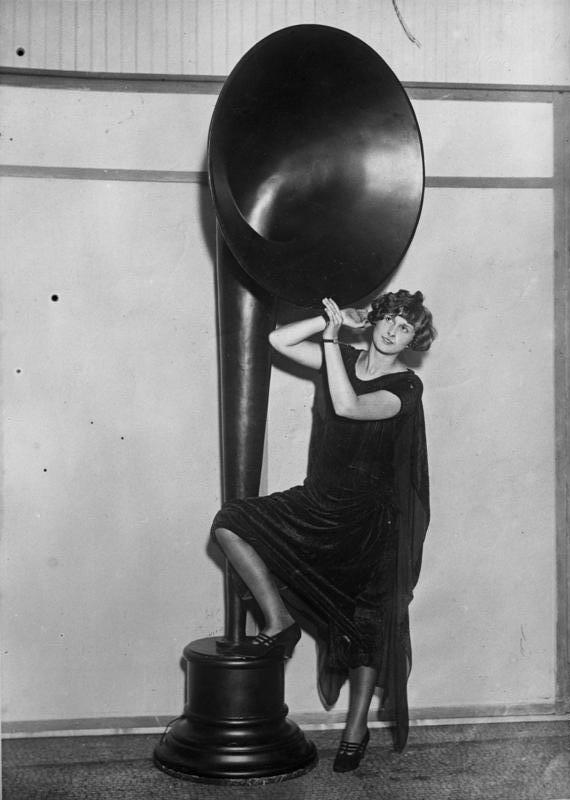
Presentation of a big speaker in 1929

== Gallery ==
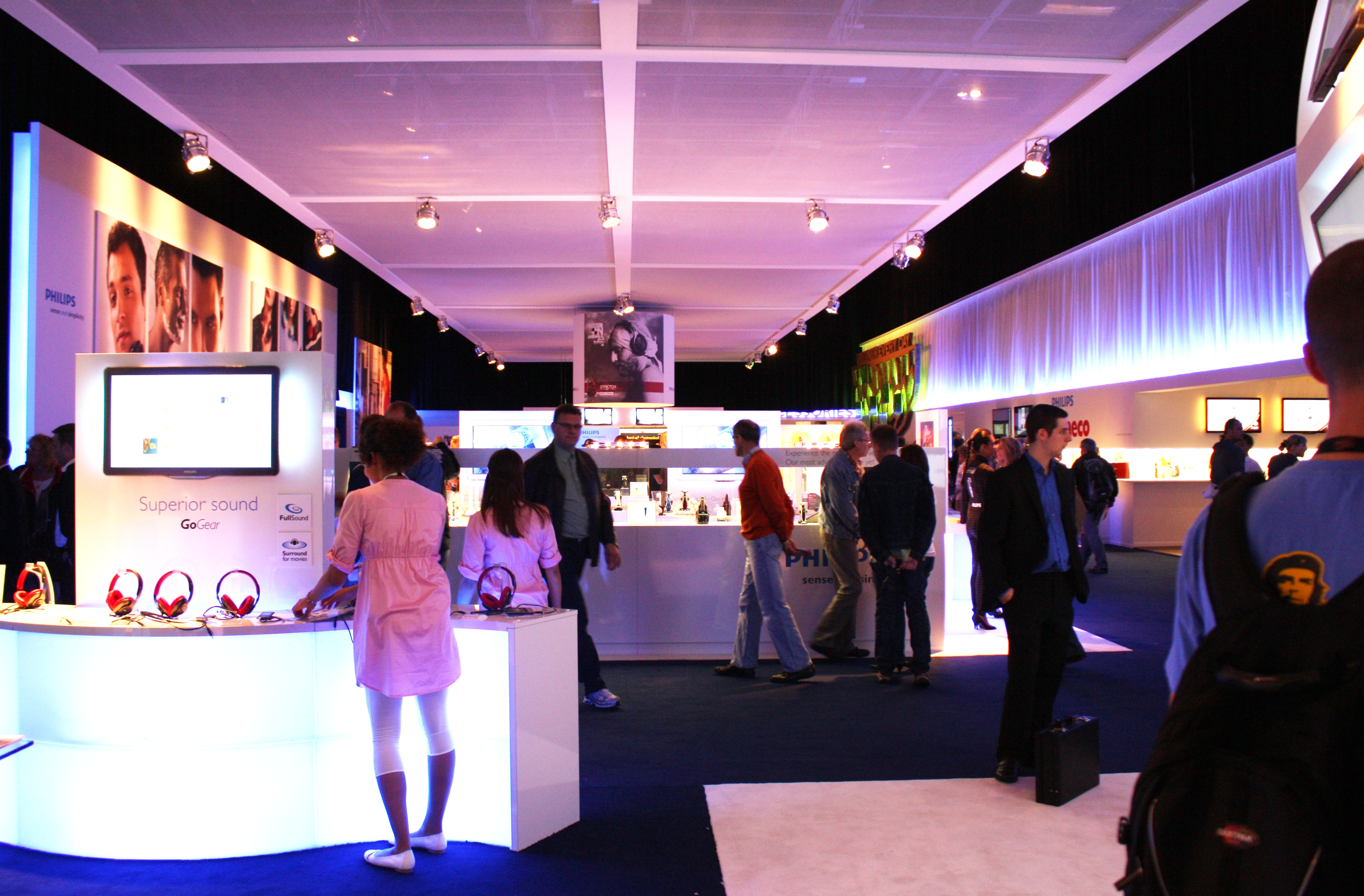
Philips booth (IFA 2010)

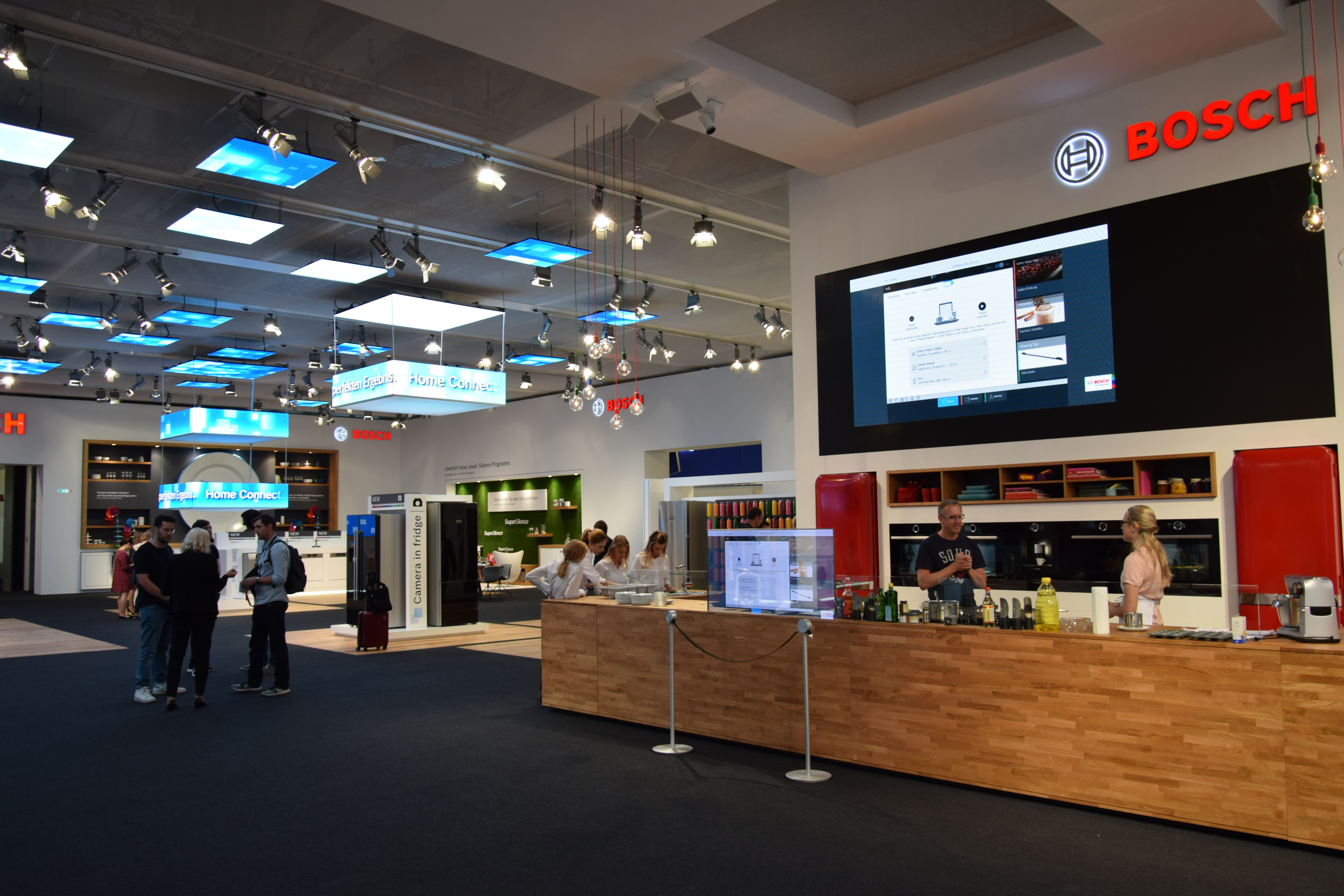
Bosch booth (IFA 2016)

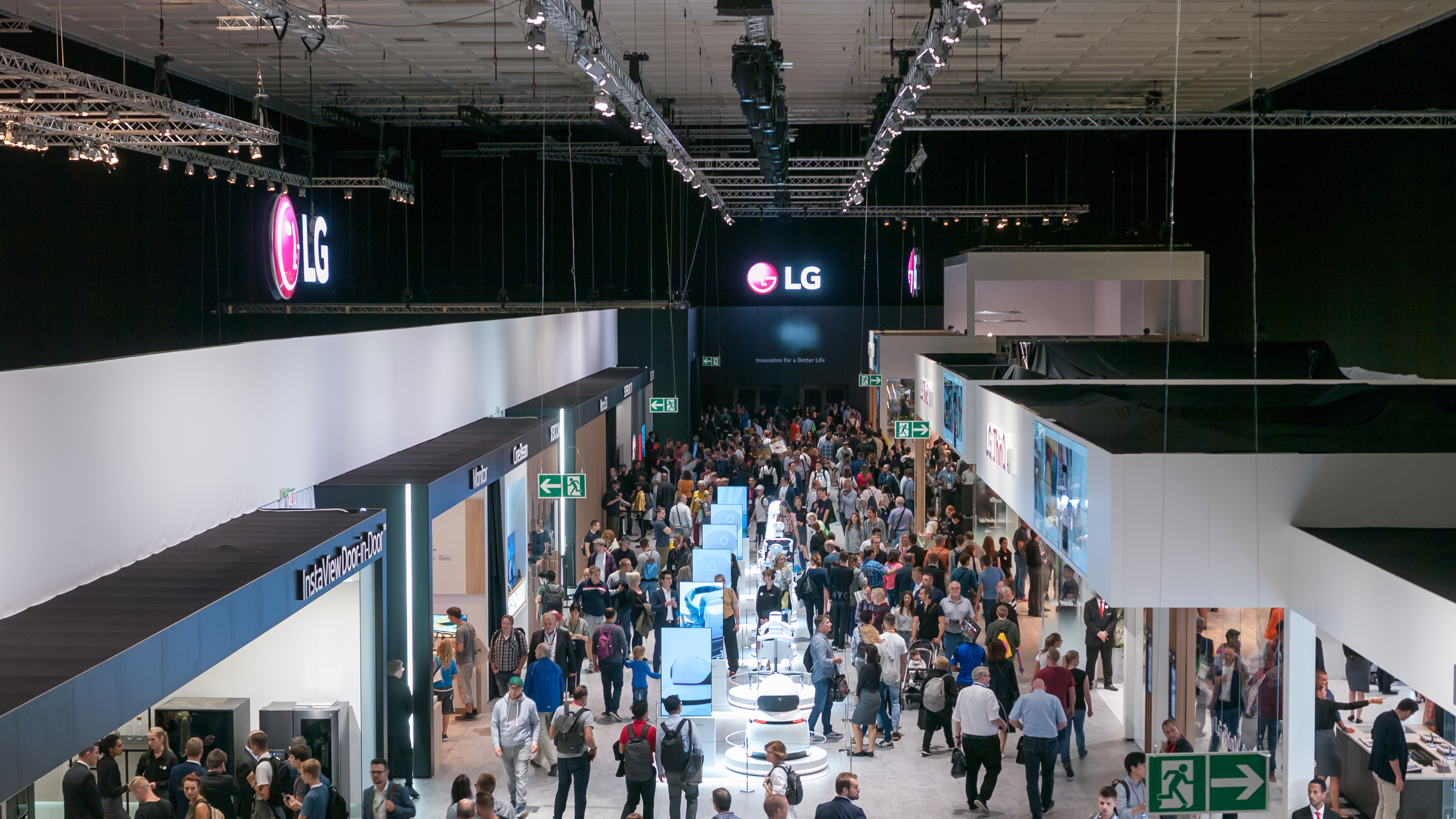
LG booth (IFA 2018)

== See also ==
- Technics Digital Link interface introduced at 2014 IFA
