= Bestensee =

- Municipality
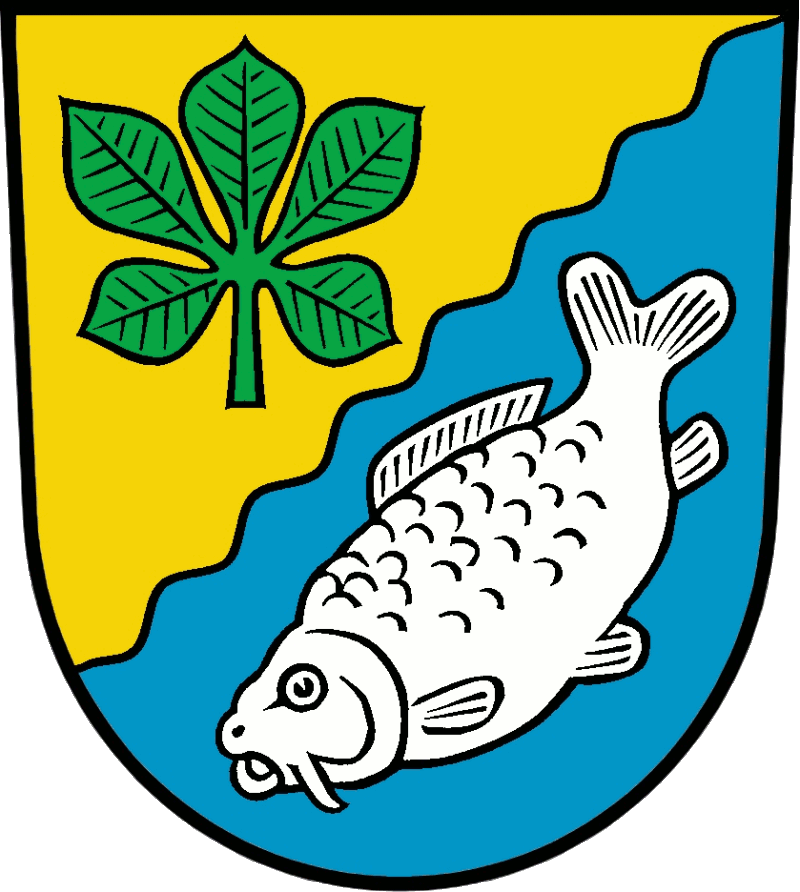
- Coat of arms

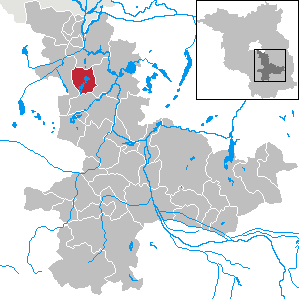
- Location of Bestensee within Dahme-Spreewald district
- Interactive map of Bestensee
- Location within Germany Location within Brandenburg
- Coordinates: 52°15′N 13°39′E
- Country: Germany
- State: Brandenburg
- District: Dahme-Spreewald
- Subdivisions: 3 Ortsteile

Government
  - Mayor (2023–31): Roland Holm (Ind.)

Area
  - Total: 38.04 km^{2} (14.69 sq mi)
- Elevation: 36 m (118 ft)

Population (2025-12-31)
  - Total: 9,388
  - Density: 246.8/km^{2} (639.2/sq mi)
- Time zone: UTC+01:00 (CET)
  - Summer (DST): UTC+02:00 (CEST)
- Postal codes: 15741
- Dialling codes: 033763
- Vehicle registration: LDS
- Website: www.bestensee.de

Bestensee (German pronunciation: [ˈbɛstn̩zeː]) is a municipality in the district of Dahme-Spreewald in Brandenburg in Germany.

== Demography ==
Development of Population since 1875 within the Current Boundaries (Blue Line: Population; Dotted Line: Comparison to Population Development of Brandenburg state; Grey Background: Time of Nazi rule; Red Background: Time of Communist rule)

Recent Population Development and Projections (Population Development before Census 2011 (blue line); Recent Population Development according to the Census in Germany in 2011 and 2022 (blue bordered line); Official projection for 2024-2040 in three variants (dotted lines 2025-2040)

Bestensee: Population development
within the current boundaries (2025)

Year	Pop.	±% p.a.
1875	751	—
1890	987	+1.84%
1910	1,786	+3.01%
1925	2,285	+1.66%
1933	2,929	+3.15%
1939	3,583	+3.42%
1946	4,231	+2.40%
1950	4,089	−0.85%
1964	4,113	+0.04%
1971	4,145	+0.11%

Year	Pop.	±% p.a.
1981	4,215	+0.17%
1985	4,494	+1.62%
1990	5,755	+5.07%
1995	5,978	+0.76%
2000	6,319	+1.12%
2005	6,669	+1.08%
2010	6,732	+0.19%
2015	7,367	+1.82%
2020	8,344	+2.52%
2025	9,388	+2.39%

== See also ==
- Pätzer Vordersee
