= Deutsche Welle GmbH =

German broadcaster of the 1920s and 1930s

Deutsche Welle GmbH was a publicly licensed, though privately financed, German broadcasting company active during the Weimar era.

== History ==
The company was founded in August 1924 (101 years ago) in Berlin, and was one of the nine broadcasting companies that were functioning during the Weimar Republic, the other eight being regional companies with medium-wave transmissions. However, while the regional companies started operations between 1923 and 1924, Deutsche Welle did not begin broadcasting until 7 January 1926 (100 years ago), when it opened a long-wave transmitter (which soon became known as the Deutschlandsender, since its broadcasts could be heard all over Germany) at Königs Wusterhausen near Berlin. A large part of the station's output consisted of the retransmission of material from the regional broadcasting companies; within this framework Deutsche Welle attempted to emphasize educational programming for a nationwide audience.

The far reach of the Deutschlandsender's long-wave transmitter meant that Deutsche Welle's programming could be heard well beyond Germany's borders. In September 1926, the Munich regional station -- the Deutsche Stunde in Bayern -- received feedback from listeners in Amsterdam when its programmes first began to be relayed by the Deutschlandsender.

On 1 January 1933, Deutsche Welle GmbH was officially renamed Deutschlandsender GmbH and given the specific remit of relaying representative programme material from the regional companies to a national audience.
