= Zeesen =

Coordinates: 52°16′43″N 13°38′03″E

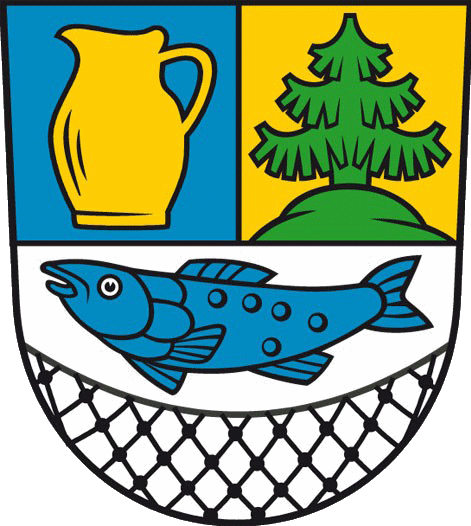
Coat of arms of Zeesen.

Zeesen is a village south of Königs Wusterhausen in Germany, known for Deutschlandsender Zeesen, which was built in 1927, and the Zeesen short-wave transmitter.
