= Hans Mahle =

German politician (1911–1999)

- Born: Heinrich Mahlmann; 22 September 1911; Hamburg, Germany
- Died: 18 May 1999 (aged 87); Berlin-Steglitz
- Occupations: Party official Politician; Anti-government activist Nation Builder (postwar); Political journalist Food Co-operative administrator Public broadcaster and broadcasting executive
- Political party: KPD; SED; SEW; PDS
- Spouse: Elsa Penner (1912–1986)
- Children: 2
- Parents: Adolf Mahlmann (1876-1945) (father); Helene Grashorn (1878-1959) (mother)

Hans Mahle (born Heinrich Mahlmann: 22 September 1911 – 18 May 1999) was a German party official, working successively for the Communist Party (KPD), the Socialist Unity Party (SED) and, after being co-opted into its leadership team in 1961, for the Socialist Unity Party of West Berlin. During the Second World War he became a founding member of the Soviet-sponsored National Committee for a Free Germany. As the war ended, on 30 April 1945, he was one of 30 men quietly delivered in a Soviet army truck to Bruchmühle, just outside Berlin, as a member of the so-called “Ulbricht Group”. He was part of the first of the three ten man cohorts, who had been flown across from the east, via Minsk, as far as the Oder, but the final part of the journey was undertaken with greater discretion. The men had arrived from Moscow with a meticulously detailed nation building plan, which would unfold in the Soviet occupation zone over the next few years. In a departure from the original plan, however, on 12 May 1945 Mahle was redeployed to an even more important project for which he was particularly well suited, on account of his wartime experience of radio technology and his talents, recognised and much prized by the Soviet party leadership, for “political education”. The Soviet military mayor-administrator in Berlin, Nikolai Berzarin ordered him to take charge of what became the East German Broadcasting Service. He remained a figure of major political importance in the Soviet occupation zone throughout the rest of the decade. However, by 1950 senior comrades were beginning to distance themselves from him, a clear sign that he was losing the leader's backing. In 1951 he was dismissed from his post on suspicion of espionage. His fall from grace was not as brutal nor as total as he might have feared at the time, and by 1956 he was the beneficiary of a gradual rehabilitation process. He never recovered his former status and influence within the party, however.

== Life ==
=== Provenance and early years ===
Heinrich August Ludwig Mahlmann (as Mahle was registered and identified officially till changing his name in 1945) was born into a working-class family in Hamburg. He grew up, after his mother lost her jobs as a cook when he was not quite 6, in Hamburg-Eppendorf. He was the younger by two years of his parents’ two sons. His father had been conscripted and was away when the family had to move, Adolf Mahlmann had nevertheless had the good fortune to suffer a serious injury early during the war, whereby he had lost his trigger finger. His physical disability meant he was unable to fire a gun, and he was therefore kept way from the worst of the fighting for much of the time. Politics was in the blood. Adolf Mahlmann would be a co-founder of the Communist Party in Hamburg less than a decade after his younger son's birth, and would die as an inmate of the Buchenwald concentration camp on account of his political convictions and activism. At the time of his birth Hans Mahlmann's parents were both in domestic service, employed over many years at one of the three homes of the wealthy businessman and ship owner Edmund Siemers. Adolf Mahlmann (1876-1945), had worked at the Siemers’ house as the coachman. His mother, born Helene Grashorn (1878-1959), was the cook. The family lived, till 1917, in a basement apartment beneath their employer's 25 room Hamburg villa. After a period of homelessness with their worldly good transported in a little cart, they found a two-room apartment space. At Easter 1918 Mahlmann entered the local school, though the asthma he had contracted during an early childhood marked by wartime austerity and hunger meant that initially he missed two thirds of the classes. His health appears to have improved subsequently.

On leaving school, he undertook a commercial apprenticeship. By this time he had already been an early member of the local “Young Pioneer Children's organisation” for several years. Another early member of the movement whom he came to know as a child was Irma Thälmann. From 1928 he and Irma Thälmann were members of the same “Young Pioneer” troupe. Through Irma he also got to know her father, Ernst Thälmann, the man who as leader of the Communist Party of Germany between 1925 and 1933 did much to determine the direction of politics in Germany for a generation or more. Meanwhile, in 1926 he joined the Young Communists. Membership, at least in Mahlmann's case involved courier work for the party, initially within Germany and later internationally. Two years later, still aged just 17, but having nevertheless completed his two-year commercial apprenticeship, Mahlmann became district leader of the “Young Pioneers” for the entire Hamburg region, while at the same time taking on the leadership of the Young Communists for the organisation's north-western sub-region ("Unterbezirk Nordwest").

Having evidently been talent spotted by the party leadership. In the early summer of 1931, still aged only 19, he was summoned to Moscow to attend an International Young Pioneers Leadership conference. In the Soviet capital there were many new experiences to absorb, and he underwent a certain amount of appropriate training. Having returned to Germany he was ordered by the party to relocate to Berlin in November 1931. He was co-opted into the “Young Pioneer” national leadership team ("Reichs-Pionier-Leitung") and given responsibility for producing “Trommel” ("Drum"), the organisation's journal. Once again, promotion within the Young Pioneer organisation went hand in hand with promotion among the Young Communists, 1931 was also the year in which Hands Mahlmann became a member of the Central Committee of the Young Communist League, a role which he retained during slightly more than three eventful years, till 1935.

=== Communist Party ===
In 1932 he reached the age of 21 and joined the Communist Party itself. He accepted nomination as “First Secretary of the Pioneer Organisation in Germany”. In October or December 1932 (sources differ) he represented Germany in this capacity at the Young Communist International meeting of the Comintern in Moscow, spending several months working as Germany's representative at the International Children's Office which had been established in 1925. The position was a somewhat shadowy one, and there are indications that Mahlmann himself never really understood was expected of him. Nevertheless, of the various representatives from different countries who were there with him, he enjoyed a certain kudos, since Germany had by far the largest and most active Young Pioneer movement outside the Soviet Union at this time. As matters turned out, he was the last person ever to hold the position.

Mahlmann had been reluctant to leave Germany at the end of 1932. With political polarisation spilling onto the streets, and the national parliament deadlocked through the refusal of the Communists and the Hitlerite parliamentary parties, to collaborate with the democratically oriented parties or with each other, there was a widespread expectation of a political explosion looming over the horizon. While Mahlmann was in Moscow, in January 1933, the National Socialists did indeed apply a skilful blend of intransigence and cunning in the face of the on-going political crisis to take power. That was followed by a rapid transition to one-party dictatorship. Well before Mahlmann was ordered back to Germany in July or August 1933, any sort of political engagement on behalf of the Communist Party had been made illegal. Many party leaders and activist members had already been arrested or fled the country. Those who remained were living and operating “underground” - somewhere other than at the address registered as their home – in order to avoid being found by officers of the security services. Mahlmann's journey home was anything but direct, For the first time in his life he travelled by plane, flying from Helsinki to Stockholm and from there to Copenhagen. Instead of continuing back to Hamburg he kept away from Germany at this stage, and flew in to Amsterdam. In the Netherlands he was able to arrange a meeting with Fritz Große, a senior party comrade who had been operating (illegally) in Germany as recently, probably, as May 1933. From Große he gained a detailed briefing on the practicalities of living out of the sight of the authorities as an active communist in Hitler's new Germany. Youth organisations – other than the Hitler youth – had been outlawed and were being ruthlessly suppressed. Große and Mahlmann engaged in intense discussion as to what might be done to put an end to “this brown barbarism” (Hitlerite Germany) as soon as possible, and what personal contributions Mahlmann might best make in support of that objective. Große was also able to share an already extensive roll-call of party comrades who had been arrested or murdered by government agencies.

=== Underground ===
In the end, the meeting with Große became a week-long briefing session from a man who had been a member of the Communist Party almost since its creation and a leader in the Young Communists for almost as long. Große told Mahlmann about a congress of the (German) Central Committee of the Young Communist League, that he had just attended in conditions of secrecy. The congress had been identified in communications as the “Bayreuth congress” in party planning documents in order to confuse any members of the German security services who came across references to it, but it had actually been conducted over several days on a canal boat chugging its way round and round the canals of Amsterdam. The attendance list comprised approximately twenty names, many of which belonged to men who would re-emerge in positions of leadership in the German Democratic Republic after 1949. In addition to Große, participants had included Artur Becker and Erich Jungmann from Berlin, Max Spangenberg from the industrially critical Ruhr region, Ernst Wabra and Erich Honecker representing Silesia and Ullrich Brurein from East Prussia. (Wilhelm Florin of the party politburo joined them from his exilte in (by this point) Paris.) Other parts of Germany, including the entire south and much of the north of the country, were completely unrepresented. There had been much disagreement, with delegates focusing on earlier mistakes, and others expressing practical reservations about the insistence that members, having been smuggled undetected back into Germany, should infiltrate the Hitler Youth organisation in order to try and redirect it, using “Trojan Horse methodology” from the inside. Despite the desperate situation and the disagreements, something resembling an action plan had emerged from the so-called “Bayreuth congress”. Große's calm but unvarnished briefing method impressed Mahlmann, and a mutual friendship and respect between the two developed, although towards the end of the week Mahlmann experienced an unexpected inner pang with the discovery that Lea Lichter, a female comrade with whom he had been briefly but evidently intensely and memorably involved while in Moscow, was Große's long-standing life-partner.

=== Underground in Berlin ===
After this week of intense preparation there was evidently no question for Mahlmann, keen to share in the movement's “underground antifascist work” of not returning to Germany. He was furnished with false identity papers and ordered to travel by train to Berlin. He travelled via Belgium, handing over to locally based comrades any potentially incriminating equipment for separate conveyance on the Belgian side of the frontier with Germany in (probably) early August, and then catching a city tram across the frontier into Aachen. Any temptation to take a detour to Hamburg and visit comrades and family members there was quickly set aside in account of his high-profile as a communist youth activist in his home city. Accommodation had been arranged in a “safe house” at Hohenschönhausen, a village which at that time was dill considered to be outside Berlin. There was a fine view across the fields from his room, but the couple who had been assigned to keep him secure were clearly very nervous, and the out of town location presented its own hazards. As news came through of a series of arrests in the immediate locality he set about making his own alternative arrangements without telling comrades or anyone else. In the city he was casually introduced, during the course of conversation, with the caretaker at an apartment block in an expensive central quarter of Berlin. The man was not a party member but was clearly no admirer of Hitler. Through his work, he had his own apartment in the block for which he was responsible, in which he lived with his wife and daughter: their son, about whom they worried constantly, was away, also “working illegally”. The caretaker's apartment had its own upper floor space. Two weeks after moving in at Hohenschönhausen, Mahlmann disappeared from the village and relocated to the caretaker's spare room at the top of an apartment in the Tiergarten quarter, conveniently central and not on the radar of party comrades (among whom the authorities could be assumed to have planted their own spies) or the authorities. During not quite two years Mahlmann would be based in various locations across central and western Germany, but whenever party business called him back on a visit to Berlin, he would continue to make use of the caretaker's upper room, sure always that he would be generously looked after, well fed and relatively safe.

Shortly after arriving in Berlin he managed to make contact with members of the Central Committee of the Young Communist League, including Walter Hähnel who would take on the leadership of the movement in 1935. The information that Young Communist organised activities involving children had been ended was a depressing indication of the extent of the changes in Germany while he had been abroad. During the period 1933-35 Mahlmann, based in Germany, managed to undertake his underground work, much of which was of an unexciting and administrative character, with a matter-of-fact attitude that belied the need for constant and intense underlying caution. taking the necessary care never to walk along the same route regularly, nor to take a direct tram/subway journey when returning home. Inevitably the security services were nevertheless aware of his presence in the country. Some of the aliases under which he is identified in surviving Gestapo files include "Mali", "Peter" and "Alfred". One name that apparently went unnoticed by the authorities at the time was “Mahle”, though it was another of the party code-names he was by this time using.

=== Underground in Leipzig ===
In September 1933 the order came through from Große that he should take over as chief Young Communist instructor for central Germany. Große was still in Amsterdam and the instruction was delivered by courier which was risky on various levels, but there was no alternative. Mahle made his way to his new base at Leipzig-Lindenau. He had been issued with half a torn cigarette card with which was to make himself known at the new safe house: the comrade meeting him would be holding the other half of exactly the same card. But he soon noticed that, as before, comrades were being arrested one after another. He left the supposedly safe house and made his own arrangements, via a trusted comrade called Rudi Hardtmann, to install another apartment, living with a family who proved trustworthy, and were indeed able to provide a number of services such as providing him with a new alternative set of identity documents, legitimising him as an insurance company representative. This remained his Leipzig base till he moved in, for a few weeks, with the family of his host's father, a typesetter. After that, circumstances conspired to persuade him to leave Leipzig.

There was much work to be done. Arrested comrades must be quickly replaced, which became more and more challenging as Gestapo raids, often resulting from the presence of spies within the little groups of activists, tore into the ranks of the little antifascist resistance groups. At the same time government propaganda that asserted that communism had been crushed, evidently encouraged a constant stream of new volunteers, keen to demonstrate that resistance continued. There were anti-government leaflets to be produced using basic printing equipment installed in basements, and then “distributed” round the city – left casually in little piles on trams, in public toilets, and on benches in public parks and train stations. A convenient informal meeting place for the comrades presented itself in the form of the large office building accommodating a local “Krankenkasse” ("health insurance") operation. Through a series of encounters in the corridors Mahle was able to get to know individual comrades and then build up an overall understanding of the condition of the party organisation in the locality and more broadly. In the remoter recesses of the insurance buildings it was even possible to hold meetings. An important chance to remind Germans that the communists had not simply evaporated occurred on 7 November 1933, which was the anniversary of the so-called October Revolution (named according to the Julian calendar which was still in use across the Russian Empire in 1917). There was a permanent fun-fair installed on otherwise the large piece of empty ground in front of the building. A comrade from Leipzig-Lindenau made his cellar available and others set to work with banners and displays. The highest point on the funfair was the roller coaster, from which a banner with sufficiently large writing on it could be seen from miles around. Overnight on 6/7 November the funfair was festooned with large communist messages. The scaffolding poles supporting the various structures were carefully coated with slippery green soap in order to make it hard to get at the banners in a hurry. The next morning the October Revolution was indeed celebrated as city folk gathered to watch members of the fire service frantically trying to clean up the site before too many people could read the messages. The message went out, however, that in their secret hide-outs the young communists had not succumbed to the one-party Hitler state. A succession of increasingly inventive “spectaculars” followed, and while activists complained that simple leafleting was not enough, leaflets calling on people to support communism and condemning the latest manifestations of Nazi barbarism continued to feature.

During his period in Leipzig, Mahle also made regular visits to Saxony, Thuringia and Halle-Merseberg in connection with his duties as a party instructor. Leipzig was the focus of an excellent railway network, and he would make use of the train service. On the trains people were subject to frequent unscheduled checks by government paramilitaries. His fictitious identify papers identifying him as an insurance representative, backed up by a briefcase stuffed with fictitious insurance documents, all carefully crafted by the family with whom he was accommodated during the first three months of 1934. It had turned out that his host was not merely a skilful document forger, but also an exceptionally prolific one. In this and other ways, despite the constant accompanying risks of discovery or betrayal, Mahle became exceptionally well networked between many surviving communist cells during the first two Hitler years, in ways which would serve him well after 1945. In 1934, however, the security services were stepping up their efforts to find him and take him out of circulation. There were several near misses and narrowly avoided entrapment incidents. One of these took place in Erfurt, and involved the alleged heavily pregnant wife of an arrested comrade who, after recounting her experiences, suddenly threw a bowl full of salt pepper in his face and attempted to overpower him. He managed to get away and stumbled into a little roadside hotel, hoping to find a room and clean himself up, only to find himself in the middle of a conference of SA officers. His involuntary shriek of horror aroused the suspicion of delegates, and he had to explain that he had just had a bowl of salt and pepper blown in his face by the wind, while sitting outside on the hotel terrace. Some of the men were sympathetic while others looked doubtful. He managed to get away through his hotel bedroom window which was at the back of the hotel, and not too far from the city's main railway station. The incident had nevertheless noted, and when he got back to Leipzig his hostess told him that the security services had been looking for him. It was time to move on.

=== Underground in Berlin and the Ruhr ===
Between March and July 1934 Mahle took charge of the Young Communists organisation in Berlin-Brandenburg. Despite numerous arrests, there were still around 700 activist members in the area, with particularly effective anti-government resistance cells at the large electro-engineering factories of AEG, Siemens, Osram. Senior party officers were by this time arrested, killed, or exiled. Prague, Paris and Moscow were emerging as three headquarter locations for (sometimes competing) leadership teams of the German communist Party. In July 1934 instructions came through from Paris that the party structure in Germany was to be decentralised, with five separate regional party hierarchies. Decentralisation had obvious advantages, but any reconfiguration would also open up opportunities for government infiltration and there were doubts expressed about the wisdom of the move within the Young Communists, not least by Mahle himself. Nevertheless, the party was controlled on a Stalinist top-down basis and during the summer Mahle was posted to Duisburg to take charge of one of the five newly decentralised regions. The first issue was to find safe accommodation. A Jewish comrade introduced him to a horse-butcher who interviewed him in the office of his large slaughter house in the city. Mahle was uninterrupted as he explained his situation, and when he had finished his plump interlocutor immediately invited him to accept sole use of the apartment he owned at the top of the house three buildings along the road from his own home. His needs would be attended to. Mahle never saw the butcher again. But every evening a large plate of meat and a supply of beer were delivered to his apartment, and he was also able to attend the works canteen at the slaughter house where his attempts to pay for his lunch were always refused. Mahle worked as an instructor and regional secretary in the Ruhr area, which traditionally had, like his home city Hamburg, been an area in which the Communist Party had been particularly strong. Nevertheless, the scope for resistance activism was becoming ever more circumscribed through the actions of government agencies. On the other hand, it was noted that letters condemning Nazi rule circulated in their thousands among members of the Hitler Youth, indicating that the “Trojan horse tactics” had borne some fruit in the region.

In August 1934 the resistance network around Düsseldorf was effectively destroyed through the arrest in a single month of some 300 comrades. Mahle's position was ever more precarious. Every meeting he attended might end in a mass arrest or a quiet arrest and a brutal series of “questionings”. That month he went into hiding. Meanwhile, unemployment in the country had been reduced. The middle and later 1930s were a period of sustained economic growth supported by deficit financing on the part of the government. Among apolitical workers who two years earlier might have seen themselves as communist supporters, there were many who were beginning to give Hitler the benefit of the doubt. For communist activists who remained in Germany, irrespective of the personal heroism of many, the trade-off between downside personal risk and upside political potential had shifted. It was time for a rethink.

=== Prague ===
During 1935 Mahle fled via Paris to Prague from where he continued to take responsibility for political youth work in the west of Germany. Later that year, he was on a “courier mission” when he was arrested and briefly imprisoned in Amsterdam. The episode may have involved an element of entrapment and false indictment involving a “Gestapo spy”, but sources are vague and sometimes inconsistent over the sequence of events in Mahle's political career at this time. In February 1936, back in Czechoslovakia, he was still listed as a Young Communist League instructor for Saxony, Berlin and the Ruhr region. By June 1936 he had relocated to Moscow, which would now be his home-base for almost nine years.

=== Soviet exile ===
Mahle's initial work following his arrival in Moscow was as a consultant with the Young Communist International ("Kommunistische Jugendinternationale" / KJI) organisation, a department of the Comintern. Between 1938 and 1941 he served on the Central Committee of the KJI. Many German communist exiles from Hitler who had settled in Moscow fell foul of Stalin's political purges during this period, but Mahle avoided that fate. Indeed, between June 1936 and September 1937 he held a parallel post as a seminar leader (political educator) at the International Lenin School, implying powerful endorsement from high up in the Soviet political hierarchy. Political endorsement from the government back home in Germany was not on the agenda. During 1937 the German authorities stripped him of German citizenship rights in absentia. In 1944 it became known that a German court martial had convicted Mahle and sentenced him to death, also in absentia, on a charge of high treason.

After his stint at the International Lenin School, he took on the position of Youth Editor with the German language section at Radio Moscow between 1938 and 1941. Several further editing jobs in the broadcasting sector <would come his way before he left Moscow in 1945. During or after 1941 he was appointed deputy to the editor in chief at Radio Free Germany, remaining a senior member of the leadership team at the broadcaster till September/October 1944.

During 1941 Mahle accepted an additional appointment as the representative of the Young German Antifascists on the Antifascist Committee of Soviet Youth.

In June 1941 a very large German military force invaded the Soviet Union. The development was not a surprise, though many contemporary commentators were shocked by the timing. Europe's two most powerful military dictatorships suddenly found themselves on opposing sides in what looked likely to become a fight to the finish. The Soviet government dusted down contingency plans for a mass evacuation which, in the case of Moscow, took place both through official actions and through Muscovites with friends, relatives or second homes to the east relocating without waiting for instructions. Moscow was also home to several thousand political exiles from the west, among whom the largest group by national provenance were survivors from among the Germans who had fled Germany after 1933, and arrangements were made for these to be evacuated with other Muscovites. In September 1941 the start of the Siege of Leningrad provided an intensified dimension of urgency to the situation. On 26 October 1941 Hans Mahle was evacuated from Moscow to Kuybyshev / Куйбышев (as Samara was known at that time), 1,000 kilometers (625 miles) down-river to the east. Kuybyshev was the new temporary seat of the Soviet government: between November 1941 and March 1942 the studios and entire editorial staff of Radio Moscow were also evacuated to Kuybyshev. On his arrival in Kuybyshev he received a mandate from the Comintern to start a re-education programme for the growing number of German prisoners of war being captured alive by the Red army. This led him, in December 1941, to the Spaski Sawod prison camp at Karaganda in Kazakhstan, as a member of a team of German communist instructors. One of these was Walter Ulbricht who by this time, like the political mentor of Mahle's teenage years, Ernst Thälmann, was emerging as one of the few Germans in whom Stalin was prepared to invest a measure of trust.

Reflecting positive assessments by his Soviet hosts of his re-education work at Karaganda, Mahle was invited to participate in a Comintern meeting at Ufa early in 1942 at which he was offered and accepted the opportunity to take charge at “Sturmadler” ("Storm Eagle"), which was a new German-language radio station designed to appeal to Hitler Youth members and other younger German soldiers who had ended up in Soviet captivity. In reality, “Sturmadler” would be operated under Mahle's direction as the youth channel of the so-called German People's Radio, though his power to control this important propaganda channel did not go uncontested. Anton Ackermann was supportive of Mahle, and for some it was enough that “Sturmadler” should be an anti-Hitler radio service, but when it came to more detailed considerations, other leading figures in the exiled German communist party were keen to have their own input as to the objectives and output of the channel. Some of the discussions became very heated.

By February 1943 the tide of the war had turned in favour of the Soviets. Muscovites were returning home and many (though by no means all) of the German political refugees who had been evacuated alongside them were also being taken back to the Russian capital. It is estimated that in the Soviet prisoner of war camps there were already more than 500,000 captured members of the German military, and Mahle was engaged in visiting the camps in pursuit of his re-education mission. In this way he was one of those undertaking on-the-ground preparation for the launch of the National Committee for a Free Germany ("Nationalkomitee Freies Deutschland"/ NKFD) which was formally launched at a conference near Krasnogorsk on 12/13 July 1943. Mahle was present at the conference, becoming a founder member of the NKFD and chairman of its youth commission. In August 1943 he received a new appointment, becoming, Technical Director with Radio Free Germany. In this context, in November 1943 he found himself deployed to the battle front near Kyiv.

As chairman of the Youth Commission of the NKVD, Mahle continued to deal with youth issues and preparations for future youth policy in a post-war Germany. That has led Wolfgang Leonhard, a former “Ulbricht insider” and a particularly well-informed and prescient commentator, to conclude that as the party leadership, while still in Moscow, finalised their plans, it was Hans Mahle who was the intended as the chairman of a youth movement or organisation and not, as actually happened when the time came, Erich Honecker. Between September 1944 and April 1945, in anticipation of the end of the war, Mahle was one of 150 comrades enrolled in a “special course” at the party academy (“Parteischule Nr. 12 der KPD”) just outside Moscow. The purpose of the course was so secret that key course members were only informed of it = still only in very generalised terms - in April 1945, after 30 participants were invited to join an additional series of evening meetings at the Hotel Lux, at which they received more specific mission briefings. The existence of the “Ulbricht Group” only became known beyond the higher reaches of the East German leadership after 1955.

=== Ulbricht group ===
On 30 April 1945 a thirty-man national building team arrived under conditions of secrecy in Berlin from Moscow with a detailed plan for rebuilding and reconfiguring the part of Germany that would soon be administered as the Soviet occupation zone. The team, which some sources identify as three teams each of ten men, came to be known, after its existence was disclosed in 1955, as the Ulbricht Group. One ten man contingent, led by Gustav Sobottka, moved on to Mecklenburg in order to focus on the northern part of the Soviet zone. Another, under the leadership of Anton Ackermann, were based in Saxony. The third group, usually seen as the lead group, remained in Berlin under the leadership of Walter Ulbricht who had overall leadership (always subject to Soviet agreement) of the entire project, and would remain in power as the executive leader of the resulting East German state till 1971. (Note: Some sources state that the Ulbricht group comprised not 30 men but 29, and that there were only 9 in the cohort that remained in Berlin during May 1945, under the direct control of Ulbricht himself. That is because one of them, Wolfgang Leonhard, later became disenchanted by the absence of the genuine political pluralism in evidence, as the carefully prepared plans which he had understood to have been finalised by January 1945 in Moscow were changed during the implementation stage after May 1945 in Berlin. He was also surprised and increasingly appalled by the brutally autocratic attitude to German comrades that Walter Ulbricht adopted on returning to Berlin from Moscow. In 1949, Leonhard fled via Yugoslavia and from there, after about a year, to West Germany, where he reinvented himself as an authoritative historian and pundit. He was therefore airbrushed out of the records in East Germany, reducing the number reported of Ulbricht Group members from 30 to 29 in sources placing reliance on East German reports of the later Ulbricht era.) Mahle was the youngest of the 30 members of the Ulbricht Group. He was part of Berlin-based cohort, working directly under the leadership of Walter Ulbricht.

Mahle was initially installed in the city centre Tiergarten quarter which he already knew well from his time as an underground resistance activist. It was Walter Ulbricht who set the agenda, and Ulbricht's first priority for Mahle was that he should participate in the urgent business of making the key appointments. It was at Ulbricht's instigation that Mahle contacted the widely respected surgeon Ferdinand Sauerbruch who was persuaded, after a certain amount of discussion, to accept appointment as the first post-war Head of the Health department in the ”Magistrat von Berlin” (city administration). It had already been agreed that Berlin should be divided between Soviet, U.S., British and French forces during a period of military occupation, but in May 1945 it was the Soviet forces that had already captured the whole of the city, and Ulbricht's plan, presumably closely aligned with Stalin's wishes, envisaged setting up a unitary city administration as rapidly as possible without waiting to see when, how or whether the division of the city, as already agreed, would be implemented. Unsurprisingly under the circumstances, 9 of the 17 members of this version of the ”Magistrat von Berlin” were members of the Communist Party: Sauerbruch was not one of these, however. Another victory for Mahle was his success in persuading Andreas Hermes to take responsibility for food distribution. Hermes was widely seen as an exceptional administrator.

Much of Berlin had been reduced to rubble, and group members were impatient explore what remained of central Berlin and see what was left. Of particular interest, along the Masurenallee, was the “Haus des Rundfunks” (broadcasting complex). The group had an unscheduled but urgent mission to locate and destroy archival records relating to the Molotov–Ribbentrop Pact negotiations. It turned out that another team had already made the necessary searches and removed any incriminating records. Nevertheless, as an experienced broadcasting editor, the chance to restore and deploy a functioning broadcasting operation in the heart of Berlin appealed to him on many levels. The Soviet military authorities and Ulbricht himself were enthusiastic believers in the power of radio to form public opinion. Ulbricht had also worked alongside Mahle during their time re-educating prisoners of war in the Soviet camps, and knew all about his abilities in the field of broadcasting. It is far from clear who first suggested the appointment, but on 11 May 1945, with the full support of Walter Ulbricht and the agreement of Hans Mahle himself, he withdrew from the Ulbricht Group in order to carry out the orders issued by the Soviet governor, “Mayor” Bezarin and “organise radio broadcasts”. Within a week Mahle, whose role amounted to that of an editor-in-chief with added administrative responsibilities, succeeded in increasing the quantity of the weekly output from 1 hour to 19 hours, with a blend of “early morning music, gymnastics, lunchtime concerts, and cheerful varied evening output”. Output was also, in Mahle's words “antifascist down to the tiniest element”. (Note: "… bis in die kleinste Darbietung hinein antifaschistisch”.) After twelve years of Hitler, any surviving resources were for the most part politically inappropriate. Early on, Mahle took to the microphone himself in order to launch an appeal for records and sheet music, works of Russian literature and works of German literature that had attracted opprobrium from the Nazis. In slightly more than two weeks, Berliners delivered more than 1,000 records to the “broadcasting house”. He remained in charge at the reborn “Berliner Rundfunk” till August 1946.

=== National politics under Soviet-style socialism ===
Mahle was not universally admired for his achievements at Berlin Radio. Several of his most senior party comrades entertained very grave reservations about the practice, which he very soon adopted, of allowing a voice on the airwaves for politicians from parties other than the Communist Party of Germany. The best known examples were transmitted in the twice weekly series “Tribüne der Demokratie” (“Tribune of Democracy”), launched on 19 June 1945. The programmes even, on occasion, featured politicians from the British or American occupation zones in what would become West Germany. Walter Ulbricht, for one, never saw any merit on political pluralism or in ventilating before the citizens opinions that differed from the official party line. For the time being, however, Mahle was left in place, and was also given the opportunity to contribute his experience and expertise to the restoration of other radio stations in the Soviet zone during 1945/46.

“Order No. 2” issued on 10 June 1945 by the Soviet military administrators was followed a few days later with the reproduction in the press of the so-called “Call by the Central Committee from the Communist Party of Germany to the German People to rebuild and antifascist democratic Germany”. (Note: “Aufruf des Zentralkomitees der Kommunistischen Partei an das deutsche Volk zum Aufbau eines antifaschistisch-demokratischen Deutschlands vom 11. Juni 1945”) It was dated 11 June 1945, and signed by sixteen top-level party leaders and officials. Hans Mahle was one of them, albeit the sixteenth on the list. The document, which has intrigued political commentators ever since it was published, a week after Ulbricht, Ackermann and Sobottka had been summoned to Moscow for a meeting with Stalin. Wolfgang Leonhard, a member of the Ulbricht Group who later fled to the west, wrote in 1965 that the meeting was called was because the Soviet government, surprised by the speed of the deterioration in Soviet-American relations following the end of the war, was in the process of hastily reformulating its plans for occupied Germany, or at least for that part of it under direct Soviet control. The ambiguities in the text, purportedly setting out a new vision for a new Germany, are strangely reflective of some of Stalin's own pronouncements on other matters. It has been subjected to a range of contrasting interpretations, primarily according to the differing political perspectives of the pundit involved. Mahle's inclusion as a signatory is nevertheless testimony to his continuing political importance at the time when it was published. Between June 1945 and September 1947 Hans Mahle was listed as a member of the Central Committee of the Communist Party of Germany and, following the contentious political merger of April 1946 which gave birth to its successor, of the Socialist Unity Party (Sozialistische Einheitspartei Deutschlands / SED). He was, in addition, a member of the presidium council of the ”Kulturbund” (East German Culture Association) between August 1945 and May 1947. The ”Kulturbund” was one of a number of so-called mass organisations which under the highly centralised government structure which was a defining feature of the Leninist power structure employed at this time under Soviet socialism in Soviet central Europe enjoyed significant privileges including a fixed quota of seats in the “Volkskammer” (national parliament).

There were also appointments within the government structure operating, till 1949, under the formal (and frequently hands-on) direction of the Soviet military. In 1946 he was appointed “Head of the Radio Department and of the Department for Cultural Enlightenment”, under the auspices of the (East) Germany Authority for People's Education. Nevertheless, in September 1947, at the Second Party congress of the SED, Mahle's membership of the powerful party Central Committee was not renewed. Instead, his seat was allocated to Heinz Kessler, a young and already senior general in the People's Army. For Mahle, this could be interpreted in a warning shot reflecting unease on the part of Walter Ulbricht over the extent and impact of Mahle's influence in the important business of communicating the government messages. Worse would follow a few years later. Nevertheless, Mahle was well networked and appears to have enjoyed the backing of Stalin till 1953. He would never suffer quite the precipitate fall from grace suffered by many others who stimulated Walter Ulbricht to a state of unease. Nevertheless, after the relaunch of the German Democratic Republic (East Germany) as a Soviet-sponsored “stand-alone state”, the entire broadcasting sector was reconfigured into a single entity, known as the “Deutscher Demokratischer Rundfunk”. A number of historians specialising in the period interpret this as a none too subtle demotion for Hans Mahle. Taken together with the accompanying personnel changes, it certainly had the effect of side-lining him away from any position involving unchallenged significant influence over public broadcasting, despite his accompanying appointment, in May 1949, as “Generalintendant” of the new organisation.

=== 1951: the fall ===
During the later 1940s Mahle he found himself in an on-going altercation with Ulbricht over his choice of residence location. In 1945 it was possible for many to assume that whatever eventually emerged from a defeated Germany, it would be a united entity, but after the currency reforms of 1948 and the failure of the ensuing siege of Berlin to win a united Germany on Stalin's terms, the Soviets came round to reluctant acceptance of a divided Germany. The political division of Berlin implicit in the agreement with Roosevelt and Churchill became more important, even if the intrusive infrastructure of physical barriers and check-points that would grow up in the 1950s was not yet in place. The “Haus des Rundfunks” in which Mahle had recreated Berlin Radio during 1945 and 1946 had ended up in the British sector. Mahle's family apartment nearby, in Berlin-Steglitz, was also in the British sector. Ulbricht let it be known, in front of senior comrades, that he thought Mahle should relocate with his family to a part of the city in the Soviet sector, but Mahle resisted the idea. He was the father of two small children by this time, and his young wife's social support network in West Berlin did indeed consist mostly of West Berliners, and so by definition people whom the East German authorities grouped together as “class enemies”. Walter Ulbricht was not a man to let matters rest once he had formed a judgment about a comrade, and Mahle found himself increasingly referred to among the more loquacious of his Central Committee comrades as a “Grenzgänger” (‘’cross-border commuter’’). The implication that he was content to live with class enemies as neighbours was not, in the circumstances, a healthy sign.

By 1951 Mahle was also found himself criticised because he insisted on devoting much of his time to the technology of television. During their shared war-time exile in Moscow he had evidently taken the opportunity to discuss and investigate television in some depth and he had become conscious of the future potential of the new medium. Walter Ulbricht was content the focus the young country's broadcasting talent and energies on radio technology, however, and senior comrades within the Central Committee were content to agree with their leader. On 14 July 1951, suddenly and without warning, Hans Mahle was dismissed from his position as “Generalintendant” at the “Deutscher Demokratischer Rundfunk”, apparently caught up in the backwash from the in-going fall of Paul Merker, who represented a far more immediate threat to the absolute leadership of Walter Ulbricht. The accusation surfaced that he had used his leadership role with the broadcaster to collaborate with the class enemy, and a surge of more generalised rumours that he had been engaging in espionage activities. A number of members of East Germany's cultural and political elite had been the subjects of similar rumour rashes and, in some cases, serious career degradation since the show trial in Budapest in September 1949. Cold War tensions were generating well publicised espionage fears on both sides of the Iron Curtain at this time. According to one estimate surfacing in a subsequently declassified CIA report, western intelligence subsequently determined that at least 300 people in the East German Communist Party were stripped of their office and imprisoned simply because they had known Field briefly in the past.

At that stage he remained in charge of television development and the research centre that had been set up for the purpose at Berlin-Adlershof. Here he continued to work, probably, for slightly more than a year after his dismissal from the top job at “Deutscher Demokratischer Rundfunk” (DDR). Sources differ. (Note: According to differing sources he continued to work at Adlersdorf till May 1951, May 1952 or August 1952, The third of these dates appears the most plausible.) Against the background of a politburo announcement of a further reorganisation at DDR the party found him a new job, after he had been blamed for a series of unspecified "accidents at the location". His new life involved living on probation, while working as a deputy branch manager at a rural food co-operative near Schwerin, which was almost as far away from Berlin as you could travel in a northerly direction without falling into the sea. According to Mahle's own later reports of the matter, the transfer was nothing like as seamless as some of the earlier reports of it had implied. Between Adlershof and his acceptance of the job at the co-op there were weeks of “hopelessness, of hiding, of helplessness and searching”.

=== Partial rehabilitation ===
The death of Stalin in March 1953 was marked by a slow reduction in the paranoia of party leaders in the Soviet satellite states of middle Europe. The political thaw was initially barely perceptible, and in the case of East Germany there were countervailing pressures resulting following the brief uprising in June 1953, brutally and effectively suppressed with Soviet military support. Nevertheless, Mahle's career benefitted through the 1950s, and as result of the cautious relaxation of some of the less subtle methods by which the East German rulers controlled the country. In Schwerin, Mahle remained under close security service surveillance, but he nevertheless rose through the ranks of the local agricultural co-operative, becoming a member of its executive board. He was also given responsibility for producing “Der Genossenschaftler ”, the newspaper of the region's co-operative movement. Through his media skills Mahle's partial rehabilitation progressed, and in 1956 he accepted an appointment as editor-in-chief at the Schweriner Volkszeitung (a party regional newspaper). He had already been installed as de facto editorial director since, according to one source November 1954, (although sources differ on the date and nature of his initial appointment at the Schweriner Volkszeitung). The job title had taken a little longer to come through. Mahle remained in charge of the production of the Schweriner Volkszeitung till February 1959. There is no indication that Mahle had ever actually been expelled from the party, and as editor-in-chief at a party newspaper that was politically important in the northern part of the country, at some point Mahle was co-opted onto the party leadership team, for the Schwerin region.

Further progress in Mahle's return to a certain level of official favour followed as February 1959 with his appointment as editor-in-chief at ”Die Wahrheit”, a weekly newspaper launched in West Berlin in 1955 to provide a voice in the west for the East German ruling SED (party). In April 1946, when the SED had been launched in East Berlin, the future extent of German division had been untested, and it is likely that the expectation of the government in Moscow had been for the SED, under the fraternal guidance from Moscow, might become the ruling party across the while Germany. In the event the SED never took root outside East Germany, and after the narrow avoidance of another world war in 1948/49, the SED was widely viewed in West Germany and West Berlin as a crude tool of Soviet imperialist ambitions. It nevertheless retained a presence in West Berlin of which ”Die Wahrheit” was a manifestation. As editor-in-chief at ”Die Wahrheit” he was soon party leadership team, for the Berlin region. A series of state honours, starting with the Patriotic Order of Merit in 1961, indicated that Hans Mahle's rehabilitation, to the extent that it might be expected from the Ulbricht government, was complete. There are indications that under Mahle's direction ”Die Wahrheit” gained in reputation and circulation. It even became the only West Berlin newspaper that could be obtained legally in East Germany, albeit strictly on a “subscription only” basis. In both West and East Berlin, ”Die Wahrheit” remained something of a niche publication.

In 1962 he became a member of the Party Executive of the SED-Westberlin (rebranded during the 1960s as the “Sozialistische Einheitspartei Westberlins“ / SEW, possibly reflecting the further separation, in simple physical terms, of West Berlin from East Berlin following the erection, in the eastern side, of the wall in 1961. Further promotion within the hierarchy of the SEW] followed. Mahle retained his position on this Party Executive along with his editorship responsibilities at ”Die Wahrheit” till 1981, when he retired on grounds of age.

=== Spitzenkandidat ===
After reunification in 1990, and almost nine years after his wife's death, Hans Mahle returned briefly to politics in 1995, when his name appeared on the ballot papers both in a national election and in a local municipal election in Berlin-Steglitz. He was 83. He was the top “list candidate” ("Spitzenkandidat") for the “Party of Democratic Socialism” (PDS), the name by which the former ruling part of East Germany had rebranded itself as it struggled to survive in a system of genuinely pluralist democracy.

Hans Mahle died through Kidney failure in the hospital at Berlin-Steglitz on 18 May 1999.

== Personal ==
Hans Mahle married Elsa Penner (1912–1986) in July 1946. The first of the couple's two children was born in July 1947. There is every indication that the marriage was a good one.

== Recognition (selection) ==
- 1961: Patriotic Order of Merit
- 1961 Honorary presidency of the Society for German–Soviet Friendship in West Berlin
- 1970: Order of the Patriotic War (Soviet decoration)
- 1970: Order of Lenin (Soviet decoration)
- 1976: Star of People's Friendship
- 1981: Order of Karl Marx
