= Funkhaus Berlin =

German recording studio

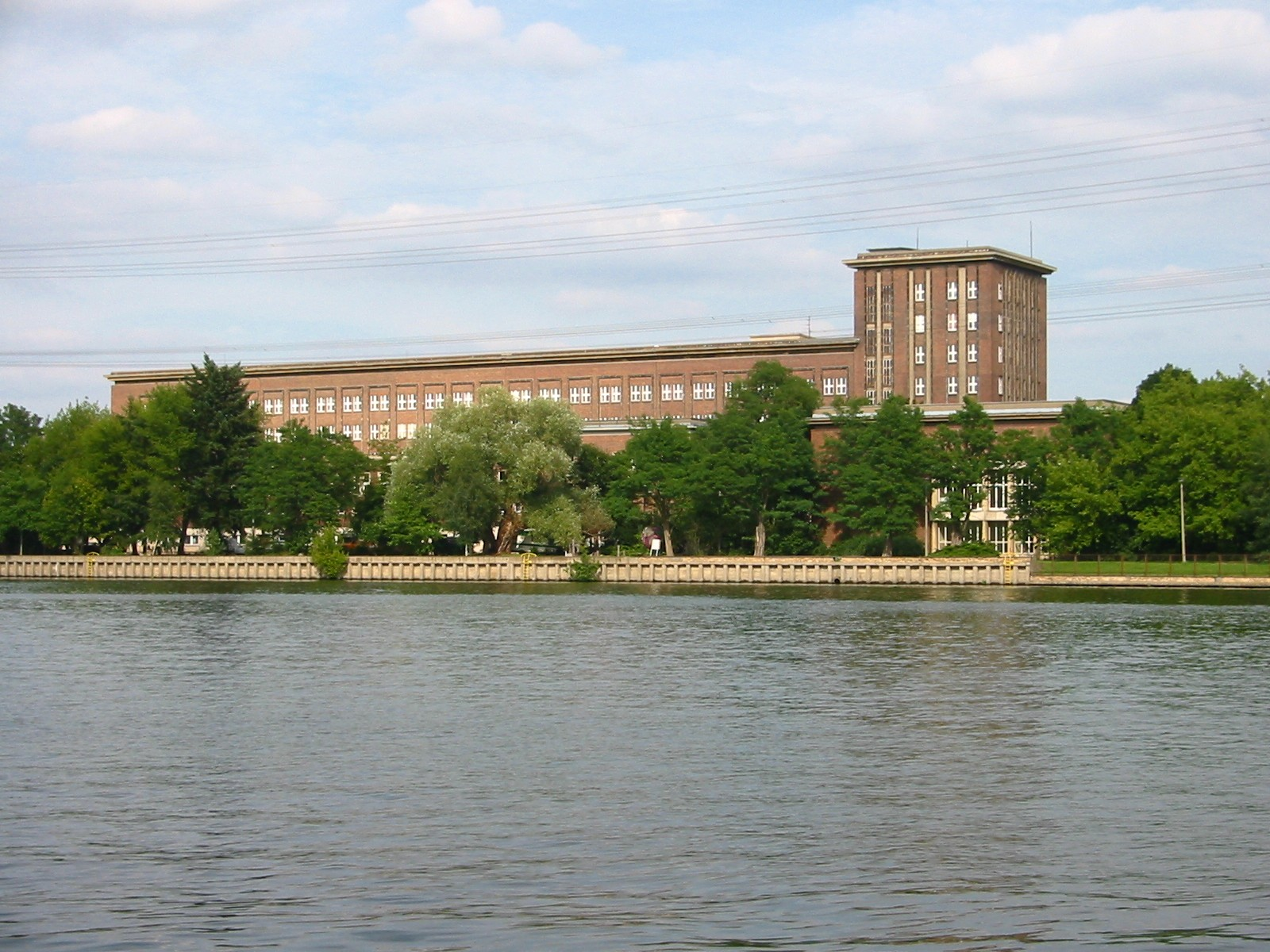
- Funkhaus Berlin building, August 2005
- Interactive map of the Funkhaus Berlin area

General information
- Location: Nalepastraße 38, Berlin, Germany
- Coordinates: 52.4795°N 13.4996°E
- Construction started: 1951

Website
- www.funkhaus-berlin.net

Funkhaus Berlin is a cultural center located in the Oberschöneweide locality of the Treptow-Köpenick borough of Berlin. Established in 1951 for Rundfunk der DDR (GDR Broadcasting) to facilitate radio broadcasting organized by the State Broadcasting Committee in the German Democratic Republic, it was expanded over the next five years into a multi-building complex, including one of the largest structures in the world purpose-built for music production.

Shortly after German reunification in 1990, Funkhaus Berlin's broadcasting activities ceased, and the complex was sold. It has since been developed to include multiple recording studios, music venues, event halls, coworking spaces, and a creative arts and technology university.

== History ==
After the End of World War II in Europe in May 1945, the Allies of World War II (the United States, the United Kingdom, and France) utilized Berlin's existing radio broadcasting facilities in the Haus des Rundfunks, so in 1951 GDR Broadcasting repurposed the concrete skeleton of a former plywood factory on the bank of the Spree river in the former borough of Köpenick to build its own radio broadcasting site. In 1956, Block B, designed by Bauhaus architect Franz Ehrlich was added, with the complex eventually comprising four buildings, or 'blocks,' the largest radio broadcasting site in the world.

Beginning in the 1950s, all of the GDR's national radio stations, including Deutschlandsender, Radio Berlin International, Radio DDR 1, Radio DDR 2, Berliner Rundfunk, and later Stimme der DDR, and DT64 now produced and broadcast from the Funkhaus Berlin facility. Over 2,500 people were employed at Funkhaus Berlin. Because staff were working in the building 24 hours a day, it included a supermarket, an outpatient clinic, a sauna, and other amenities.

Following the reunification of Germany in 1990, Funkhaus Berlin's broadcasting activities were phased out, and the studio complex was shut down in 1989 and fell into disrepair. In 1995 the complex was put on the market and sold to the first bidder for $150,000. It changed ownership several more times before being acquired by entrepreneur Uwe Fabich in 2015.

Now a protected architectural site, it has become a recording and production complex that hosts concerts, festivals, club events, fashion shows, conferences, and more.

== Facilities ==
Funkhaus Berlin's complex consists of multiple buildings, or 'blocks,' which reside on its over 32 acres of property.

=== Block A ===
Block A is a 9-story building that originally housed broadcast studios and offices for editors and administrators. The building currently houses facilities for the Catalyst Institute for Creative Arts & Technology (formerly dBs Music Berlin).

=== Block B ===
Block B, built from 1953 to 1956, is a 15,000–square–meter building which originally housed six main studios, making it one of the largest structures purpose-built for music production in the world. The various studios within Block B, each erected on its own separate foundation for sound isolation, vary in size and design for puposes ranging from symphonic, chamber, and pop music to foley recordings for state-run music labels and broadcast radio stations.

==== Studio 1 ====
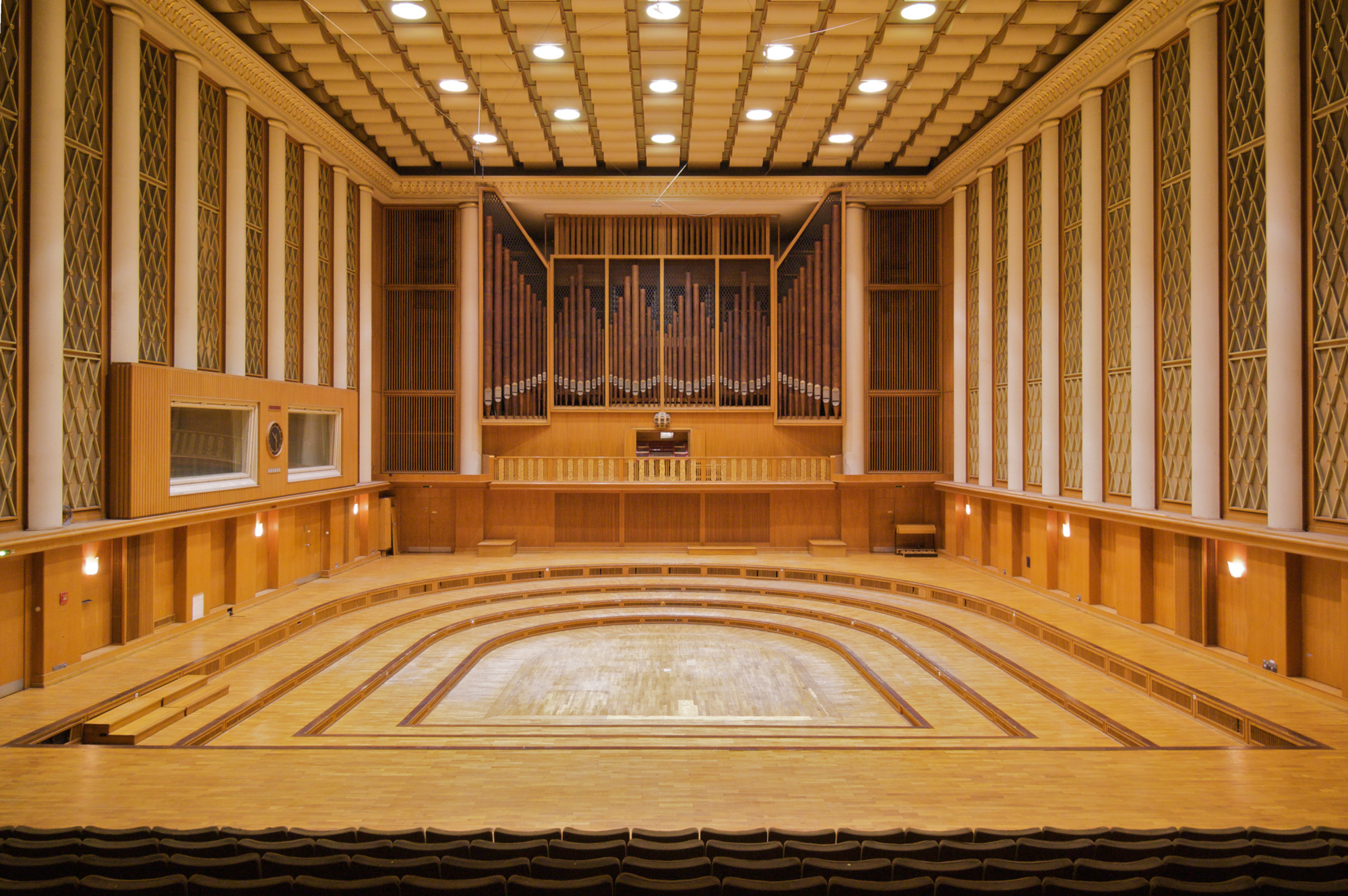
Funkhaus Berlin Großer Saal 1 (stage)

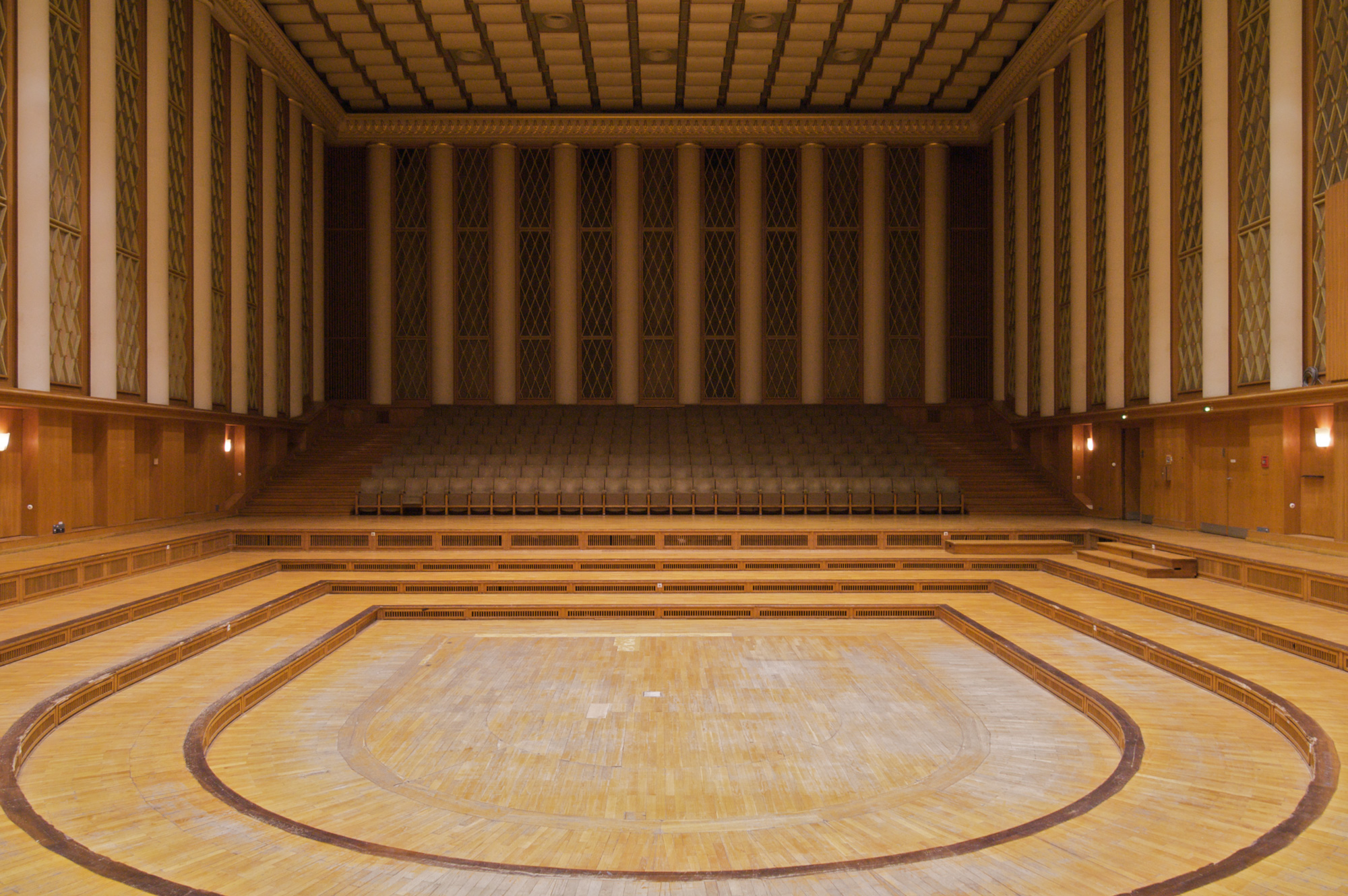
Funkhaus Berlin Großer Saal 1 (rear)

Studio 1 (originally referred to as Großer Saal 1, or Hall 1) is Funkhaus Berlin's largest recording space. The ornate hall with Colosseum-style seating overlooking an orchestra pit boasts over 900 square meters of floor space and 12,300 cubic meters of space overall is ideal for orchestral recordings. Estimated to be the largest purpose-built recording studio in the world, today Funkhaus' Studio 1 is primarily utilized as a live music venue.

==== Studio 2 ====
Studio 2 (originally referred to as Saal 2, or Hall 2), with a floor area of approximately 400 square meters, is well-suited to recording smaller ensembles or pop music.

==== Studio 3 ====
Studio 3, originally designed for chamber orchestra, features a 140 square meter live room and 32 square foot control room. In 2016 Nils Frahm began hosting the studio, which he refers to by its original Saal 3 name. Frahm has since used Saal 3 for projects including All Melody (2018).

==== Studio 4 ====
Studio 4 (originally referred to as Saal 4, or Hall 4) is well-suited to record pop music, and more closely resembles a modern recording studio, with isolation booths and attached spaces with a variety of surfaces to create foley effects for radio plays. There’s also a large echo chamber for creating a wide variety of reverb effects.

==== Funkhaus Studio ====
Funkhaus Studio is another recording studio within Block B, which was originally Hörspielstudio (‘radio play studio’) H1, one of two Funkhaus studios used for the production of radio plays. This studio was renamed Planet Roc, and hosted recording sessions from artists including Sting, Joe Jackson, the Black Eyed Peas, A-ha, and Phoenix. After Plant Roc ceased operations in 2011, Yensin Jahn partnered with Philipp Dusse to reopen the studio as Funkhaus Studio, recording artists including Till Brönner, Rammstein, Emigrate, Apparat, Dear Reader, and These New Puritans. Funkhaus Studio features five different live rooms, the largest being 185 square meters in size.

=== Block C ===
Block C is the Kultursaal.

=== Block D ===
Block D, originally built as a garage for the GDR state radio's broadcasting trucks, is now the Shedhalle, or Event Hall.

== Events ==
Funkhaus has hosted numerous concerts and music festivals. In 2016, Funkhaus hosted the Michelberger Music Festival curated by Bon Iver's Justin Vernon, the National's Aaron Dessner, Bryce Dessner, Marijuana Deathsquads' Ryan Olson, Vincent Moon, André de Ridder and the founders of the Michelberger Hotel in Berlin. In 2018, the organizers returned to Funkhaus for a second edition, which was now called PEOPLE. On 17 March 2017, Depeche Mode gave a promotional concert to 1000 fans at the Funkhaus Berlin to promote their Global Spirit Tour, streaming the concert live on the internet. In 2018, Ryuichi Sakamoto performed a concert with Alva Noto at Funkhaus. Nils Frahm's 2020 film, Tripping with Nils Frahm, was recorded from his live performance at Funkhaus Berlin. Other artists who have performed at Funkhaus Berlin include Aphex Twin, Four Tet, and The Necks.

Funkhaus Berlin has hosted numerous conferences, including MusicTech Fest, Superbooth, Ableton Loop, CTM Festival, and the Spatial Festival. In 2018, Funkhaus Berlin was the Red Bull Music Academy venue.

Since 2023, the Utopia international festival orchestra has maintained a creative residence at the Funkhaus Berlin.

== In popular culture ==
Portions of the soundtrack of the 2015 film The Revenant were recorded by Bryce Dessner and Stargaze at Funkhaus.

The entryway to Block B appeared in the 2018 film Balloon.

== See also ==
- Rundfunk der DDR
