= Broadcasting in East Germany =

Broadcasting in East Germany was performed by two organisations.

- Deutscher Fernsehfunk, the East German television organisation also known as Fernsehen der DDR
- Rundfunk der DDR, the East German radio organisation
