= Utopia (orchestra) =

International festival orchestra led by Teodor Currentzis

- Orchestra
- Founded: 2022
- Concert hall: Funkhaus Berlin
- Music director: Teodor Currentzis
- Website: utopia-orchestra.org

Utopia is an international festival orchestra founded by conductor Teodor Currentzis. The ensemble brings together more than 100 musicians from over 30 countries on a project basis and maintains a creative residence at the Funkhaus Berlin. Utopia performs regularly at major European concert halls and at festivals such as the Salzburg Festival.

== History ==
=== Foundation ===
The artistic director of Utopia is Teodor Currentzis, who developed the idea for the project back in 2018. In August 2022, Utopia was announced as a "creative community" that aims to bring together musicians from all over the world to form a "team of like-minded people with a shared musical ideology" dedicated to intensive engagement with repertoire and the search for an ideal sound.

Utopia is assembled anew for each project. Its members – from more than 30 countries – are selected by Teodor Currentzis. Many of the musicians who have participated in Utopia are members of major European orchestras, including the Concertgebouw Orchestra, the Staatskapelle Dresden, the Berlin Philharmonic, the Bavarian Radio Symphony Orchestra, and the Vienna Philharmonic. Especially the first violin section consists predominantly of concertmasters.

The ensemble is funded by concert revenues and private European patrons.

=== Performances ===
The first concerts took place in October 2022 at the Philharmonie Luxembourg, Laeiszhalle Hamburg, Konzerthaus Vienna, and the Berliner Philharmonie. The program included Stravinsky's 1945 Suite The Firebird, Ravel's Suite No. 2 from Daphnis et Chloé, as well as La Valse and Boléro.

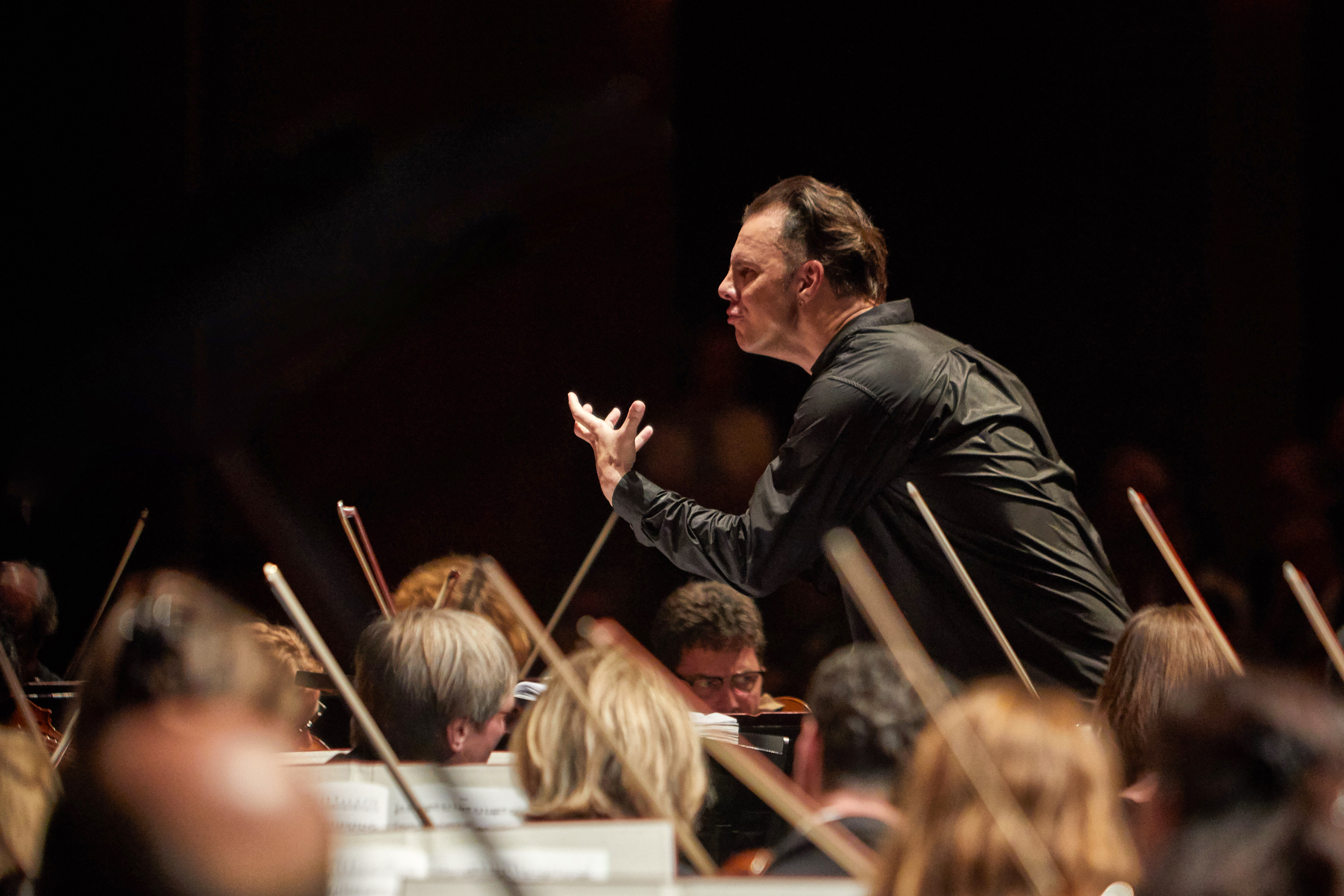
Teodor Currentzis (2019)

Since then, Utopia has performed in a number of other renowned concert halls, including the Elbphilharmonie Hamburg, Festspielhaus Baden-Baden, Müpa Budapest, deSingel Antwerp, Die Glocke Bremen, Athens Concert Hall, and the Santa Cecilia Hall in Rome.

The orchestra performs three to four new programs each year. So far, Utopia has performed works such at Mahler's 3rd, 4th and 5th symphony, Tchaikovsky's 5th symphony and Bruckner's 9th symphony, among others. The musicians of Utopia mostly play standing up.

In 2023, Utopia debuted at the Salzburg Festival with Purcell's The Indian Queen staged by Peter Sellars and Mozart's Great Mass in C minor. For this occasion, Teodor Currentzis also assembled the Utopia Choir, which consists of 40 singers from leading European theatres and ensembles. The following year, they performed Mozart's Don Giovanni staged by Romeo Castellucci and Bach's St Matthew Passion.

At the 2025 Salzburg Festival, the ensemble performed the opera Castor et Pollux by Rameau in a concert version, as well as Mahler's 4th Symphony and Shostakovich's Piano Concerto No. 2. With Castor et Pollux, Utopia also made its debut at the Paris Opera earlier that same year in a production by Peter Sellars.

=== Recordings ===
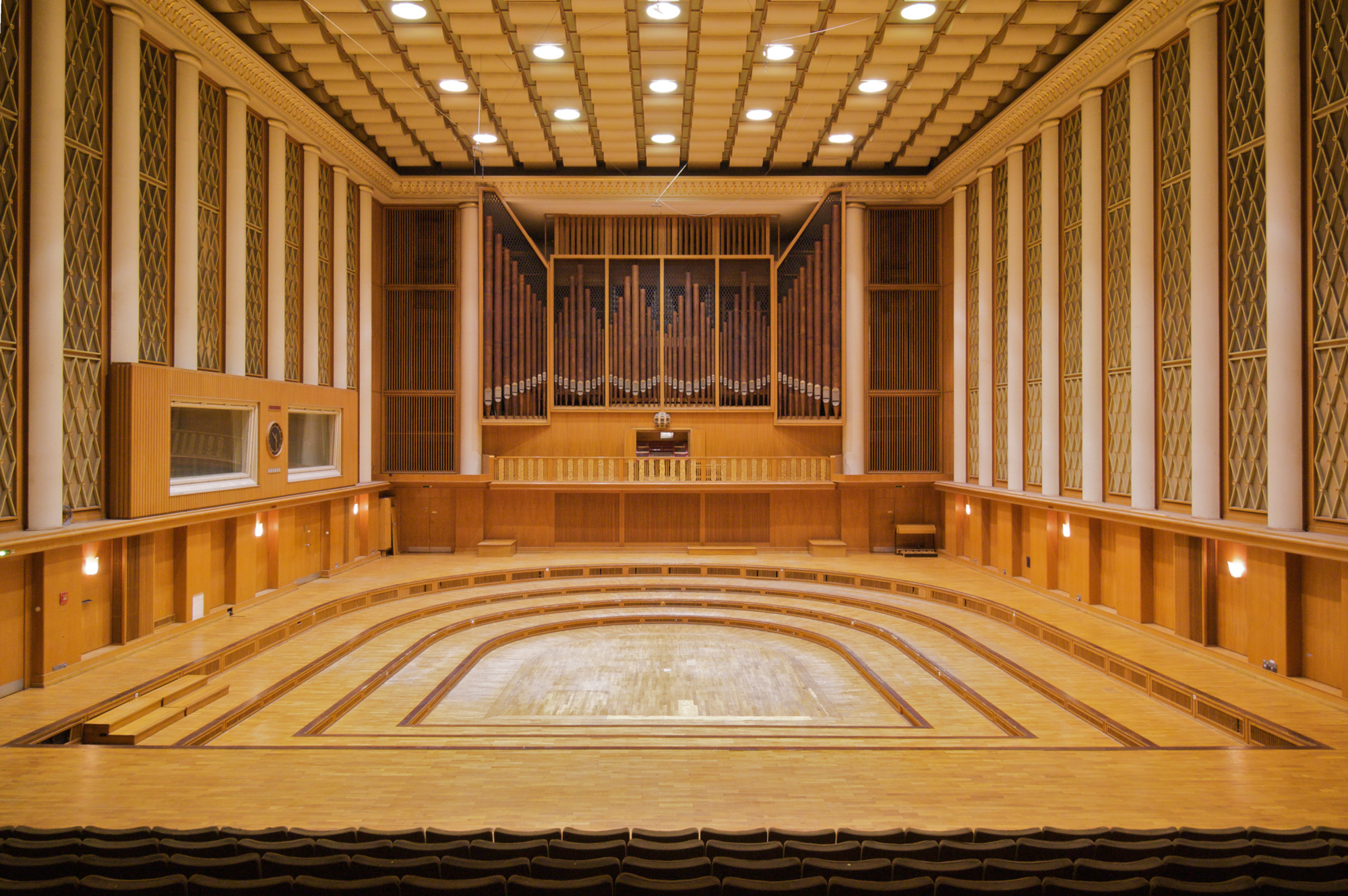
Funkhaus Berlin, large broadcasting hall

Since 2023 Utopia has maintained a creative residence at the Funkhaus Berlin, whose large broadcasting hall is internationally recognized for its exceptional acoustics. The ensemble uses the venue to rehearse in preparation for its tours and to produce studio recordings.

Releases appear on Theta, a label founded by Teodor Currentzis in collaboration with Outhere Music. The label's initial releases include recordings of Bruckner's 9th Symphony and Mahler's 3rd Symphony, scheduled for release in 2026. The rehearsals and recording sessions for the Mahler symphony are the subject of the documentary film Junkies of Dreaming by Jan Schmidt-Garre.
