= Ulbricht Group =

Secret communist administration in post-war Germany

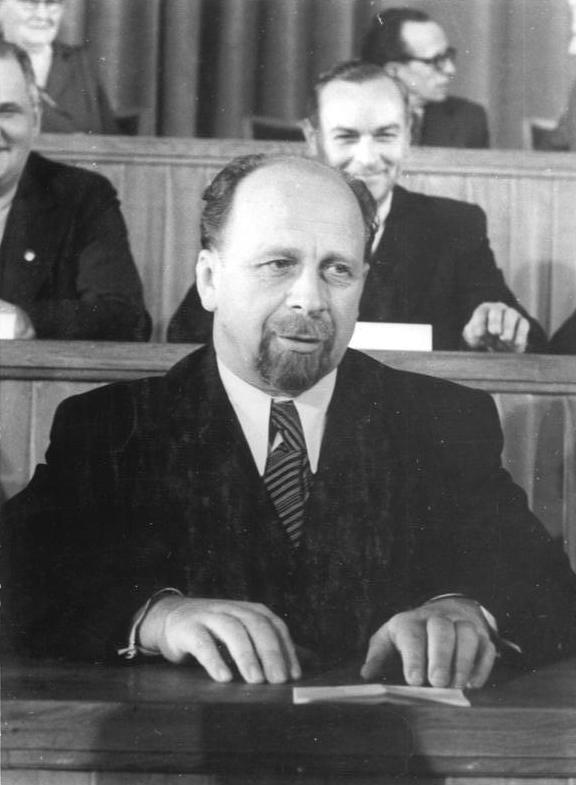
Walter Ulbricht seated in the People's Chamber (Volkskammer) after the 1950 East German general election. Photograph by Horst Sturm (November 15, 1950), East Berlin, Bundesarchiv.

The Ulbricht Group was a secret political administration composed of exiled members of the Communist Party of Germany (German: Kommunistische Partei Deutschlands, or KPD) and the National Committee for a Free Germany (German: Nationalkomitee Freies Deutschland, or NKFD), led by German politician Walter Ulbricht, who flew from the Soviet Union back to Allied-occupied Germany on April 30, 1945. Composed of functionaries from the KPD and ten anti-fascist German prisoners of war, their job was to seek out anti-fascist individuals and prepare the groundwork for the re-establishment of communist organizations and unions in post-war Berlin. There were two additional regional groups, the Ackermann Group in Saxony and the Sobottka Group in Mecklenburg. The Ulbricht Group was instrumental in the early development and establishment of the German Democratic Republic (German: Deutsche Demokratische Republik, or GDR), and many of the Group's members later became high-level officials in the country's government.

== Political operation ==
The tasks for the Ulbricht Group and the other communist cadres who were to return to Allied-occupied Germany under the administration of the Allied Control Council (German: Alliierter Kontrollrat, or ACC) were defined at a meeting between Wilhelm Pieck and Georgi Dimitrov held in Moscow, Soviet Russia on April 25, 1945. Dimitrov was then a high-level functionary of the Central Committee of the Communist Party of the Soviet Union, working as the assistant division leader of the International Information Division. They were to prepare the Eastern regions to accept and follow the instructions of the Soviet Military Administration in Germany (German: Sowjetische Militäradministration in Deutschland, or SMAD) so that the Nazi government could be dismantled. The Denazification process in post-war Germany was to convince the German people to turn over Nazi war criminals and to reject Nazism altogether. The Group was to calm the German people and assure them that the Soviet Red Army would neither destroy nor enslave them; but the Group was also to convey that Germans had to understand that they bore the responsibility for Hitler's rise to power, giving force to Nazi policies and causing the start of World War II.

In this narrative to be promulgated by the Ulbricht Group, German communists and social democrats had tried to warn the German people of the coming catastrophe, and were now there to help the people out of their distress. While communicating this message, the Group was to establish a basis for the future of the Communist Party of Germany (KPD). Moreover, they were to seek out anti-fascist individuals and prepare the groundwork for the re-establishment of communist organizations and unions in post-war Berlin. The youngest member of the Group was 24-year-old Wolfgang Leonhard. As a result, the Free German Trade Union Federation (German: Freier Deutscher Gewerkschaftsbund, or FDGB) was founded in the Soviet occupation zone. The Soviet Military Administration in Germany increasingly required communists to be represented in trade union leadership. After the foundation of the Socialist Unity Party of Germany (German: Sozialistische Einheitspartei Deutschlands, or SED) through a forced merger between the KPD and the SPD in 1946, purges were implemented immediately. Christian-social and other independent social-democratic union members were dismissed and had to flee to West Germany.

The Ulbricht Group left from the Hotel Lux, where they had been living in exile (some for years), and flew from Moscow to Minsk, then to Calau (near Międzyrzecz). Some members of the Group did not know what their assignment was, nor how long it would last, until after they landed. They landed in an airfield and were met by a Soviet officer, who drove away with Ulbricht. The rest left by truck for Bruchmühle, about 30 kilometers (19 mi) east of Berlin and the offices of Marshal Georgy Zhukov, the first commander of the Soviet occupation zone (German: Sowjetische Besatzungszone, or SBZ). The Ulbricht Group began working from there on May 2, 1945, though not much could be done with the city in flames after the battle of Berlin. In the evening, Ulbricht met with the Group and explained their assignment. They were to cover all 20 districts in Berlin and begin building local administrations. In each, they were to seek out as many social democrats as possible, also a civil servant with a Ph.D. from each local administration who was willing to work with the Soviets, and a cleric to lead a religious advisory council. Communists were to be installed in each district as assistant administrators, and to head up the departments for personnel and development. The Group worked from Bruchmühle till May 8, after which they moved to the Friedrichsfelde area of Berlin.

On May 6, 1945, Ulbricht gave the Soviet commander of Berlin, Nikolai Berzarin, the first list of suggested names to fill important administrative posts in Berlin. On May 12, 1945, the district administrators and city councils were appointed from Ulbricht's list without exception. Paul Markgraf, one of the ten anti-fascist German prisoners of war, was appointed the "Berlin Police President", also on Ulbricht's initiative. In the beginning of June 1945, Ulbricht, Ackermann, and Sobottka traveled back to Moscow to give the first reports and get their further instructions. On June 4, 1945, they met with Wilhelm Pieck, Andrei Zhdanov, and Stalin. Stalin urged them to found a nationwide, working-class communist party that would remain open for the proletariat, farmers, and intellectuals. He wanted the party to work for a unified Germany, and said that, in his opinion, the Western regions wanted to split the country into partitions; according to Pieck, their goal was to "[complete] the civil-democratic revolution through a civil-democratic government". The founding manifesto of the Communist Party of Germany (KPD) was written by Ackermann himself. In it, the new party spoke openly against a Sovietization of Germany. It stated that the goal was to "continue to its conclusion the civil-democratic transformation begun with the revolutions of 1848", and, through land reforms, to eliminate the "remnants of feudalism". Hence, the final goal of the KPD was the "establishment of an anti-fascist, democratic republic with all democratic rights and freedoms for the people". Since its foundation, the German Democratic Republic (GDR) was generally viewed as a communist state and described itself as a socialist workers' and peasants' state. With the re-establishment of the KPD on June 11, 1945, the Ulbricht Group reached its first goal. On July 10, 1945, it moved into the KPD's Central Committee building.

== Existence concealed ==
Until 1955 and the publication of Wolfgang Leonhard's memoir, Die Revolution entläßt ihre Kinder (later published in English as Child of the Revolution), knowledge of the Ulbricht Group was kept secret. In Leonhard's opinion, it was kept secret to the general public, both in East Germany and West Germany, so as not to emphasize the pivotal role of German communist revolutionaries who had been previously exiled to Moscow, Soviet Russia in the anti-Nazi German resistance and the establishment of the German Democratic Republic (GDR) after the end of World War II. After 1955, several versions of the story appeared regarding the composition of the Group and the order of events leading to the appointments.

There is disagreement among historians of World War II as to whether or not Stalin and Ackermann were earnest in their affirmation of a parliamentarian republic with democratic rights and freedoms for its citizens. Leonhard reported the oft-cited comment that Ulbricht himself made during this period: "It is quite clear. It must look democratic, but we must have everything in hand." Some historians affirm that by Spring 1945, the establishment of a communist-dominated government in the Soviet occupation zone and the proclaimed democracy was merely a transitional stage, but at least one historian believes that Stalin earnestly pursued the creation of a Western-style democratic republic for post-war Germany, as it was the only way he could secure the responsibility from the other Allied governments due to the multinational occupation of post–World War II Germany, which without him would easily have been able to deny access to the resources of the Ruhr region that he desperately needed as reparations to rebuild the war-ravaged Western regions of the Soviet Union. (Note: In fact, the Americans did halt the delivery of reparations to the Soviet Union from the U.S. occupation zone in early May 1946.)

== Members ==
- Walter Ulbricht (1893–1973), Leader. First secretary of the Socialist Unity Party of Germany, 1950 to 1971; chairman of the State Council of the German Democratic Republic, 1960 to 1973
- Fritz Erpenbeck (1897–1975), National Committee for a Free Germany (from 1943)
- Karl Maron (1903–1975), co-editor of the newspaper Freies Deutschland from 1943; later, assistant chief editor of the newspaper, Neues Deutschland and Interior Minister of the GDR
- Hans Mahle (1911–1999), editor of the German-language Moscow radio broadcasts, later chief editor of the newspaper Schweriner Volkszeitung
- Walter Köppe (1891–1970), administrative director of the Bauakademie Berlin until 1955, employed at the Ministry for Heavy Machinery Construction
- Richard Gyptner (1901–1972), secretary to Comintern General Secretary Georgi Dimitrov, 1933–1935; editor at radio Deutscher Volkssender in Moscow; head of the Capitalist Foreign Countries division (Kapitalistisches Ausland) of the GDR's Foreign Ministry and diplomat
- Wolfgang Leonhard (1921–2014; went by the name Vladimir Leonhard), graduate of the Comintern school and radio announcer at Freies Deutschland; broke with Stalinism in 1949, fled to Yugoslavia, then to the Federal Republic of Germany
- Otto Winzer (1902–1975), Moscow pseudonym: Otto Lorenz; chief of staff for GDR President Wilhelm Pieck until 1956; Foreign Minister of the GDR, 1965 to 1975
- Gustav Gundelach (1888–1962), editor and radio announcer at Deutscher Volkssender in Moscow; KPD representative of the first German Bundestag
- Otto Fischer (1901–1974), worked at the Berliner Rundfunk radio station

== Regional groups ==
=== Saxony ===
- Anton Ackermann (1905–1973), Leader. Went by the name "Peter Ackermann", as he was most often called in Moscow, Soviet Russia.
- Hermann Matern (1893–1971)
- Fred Oelßner (1903–1977), known as "Fred Larew"
- Kurt Fischer (1900–1950)
- Heinrich Greif (1907–1946)
- Peter Florin (1921–2014), deputy representative to the United Nations
- Franz Greiner
- Egon Dräger
- Artur Hofmann (1907–1987)
- Georg Wolff (KPD)

=== Mecklenburg ===
- Gustav Sobottka (1886–1953), Leader. East German politician.
- Gottfried Grünberg (1899–1985)
- Willi Bredel (1901–1964)
- Stanislaw Switallade
- Arthur Fiedler
- Georg Kamann
- Rudolf Herrnstadt (1903–1966), replaced Kurt Bürger (1894–1951) who was originally supposed to be in the group
- Karl Rabb (1906–1992)
- Oskar Stefan
- Herbert Hentschke
- Walter Offermann
- Bruno Schramm

== See also ==
- Anti-Nazi German resistance
- Marxism–Leninism
- Politics of East Germany (1945–1990)
  - 1946 Soviet occupation zone state elections
  - Bloc of the Anti-Fascist Democratic Parties (1945–1950)
  - Constitution of East Germany (1949)
  - German People's Congress (1947–1949)
  - Merger of the KPD and SPD (1946)
  - National Front of the German Democratic Republic (1950–1990)
    - Christian Democratic Union (East Germany) (CDU)
    - Democratic Farmers' Party of Germany (DBD)
    - Liberal Democratic Party of Germany (LDPD)
    - National Democratic Party of Germany (East Germany) (NDPD)
    - Socialist Unity Party of Germany (SED)
- Socialist patriotism
- Socialist Unity Party of West Berlin (SEW)
- Soviet communism
- Stalinism

== Bibliography ==
- Wolfgang Leonhard, Die Revolution entlässt ihre Kinder. Kiepenheuer und Witsch, Cologne (1955), Wilhelm Heyne Verlag, Munich (1985)
- Wolfgang Leonhard, Spurensuche. 40 Jahre nach 'Die Revolution entlässt ihre Kinder'. Kiepenheuer und Witsch, Cologne (1992–94)
