= SVZ =

SVZ can refer to:

- Subventricular zone, a structure in the mammalian brain
- South Volcanic Zone, a volcanic arc in southwestern South America
- Slovak Air Force (1939–1945) (Slovak: Slovenské vzdušné zbrane)
- Schweriner Volkszeitung, a German newspaper
- Steve van Zandt, American musician
