= Norddeutsche Neueste Nachrichten =

German newspaper

Website logo

The Norddeutsche Neueste Nachrichten (NNN) is a newspaper distributed in Rostock, Germany. It is affiliated with the Schweriner Volkszeitung. The controlling company, NNN Norddeutsche Neueste Nachrichten GmbH, has its head office in Rostock.
