= Artur Hofmann =

German politician (1907–1987)

- Born: 24 June 1907; Plauen, Kingdom of Saxony, German Empire
- Died: 4 May 1987 (aged 79); East Berlin, East Germany
- Occupations: Politician senior Stasi officer
- Political party: KPD; SED

Artur Hofmann (24 June 1907 – 4 May 1987) was a German Communist Party politician.

He was a member of the Ackermann Group that arrived in Saxony from Moscow in 1945 to prepare the way for Soviet Military Administration in the parts of Germany destined to be transformed into the German Democratic Republic. Between 1949 and 1952 he was the Minister of the Interior for Saxony until the abolition of a regional tier of government following national administrative reforms. He then became a senior functionary in the new country's Ministry for State Security (Stasi), where he served between 1953 and 1970, ending up as a colonel in the organisation.

== Life ==
=== Early years ===
Hofmann was born in Plauen, a mid-sized town in central southern Germany approximately 100 miles (160 km) south-west of Dresden. His father was a locksmith and his mother worked in a factory. On leaving school Hofmann got a job helping out in the market. In 1921 he undertook an apprenticeship, and then took a series of jobs as a locksmith/machinist and in related trades. He relocated several times in the 1920s, working successively in Thuringia, Bavaria and the Ruhr region. Between 1927 and 1929 he lived in The Netherlands, Austria, Czechoslovakia, Hungary, Yugoslavia and, finally, Bulgaria. He then returned to Germany, taking a job in Hamburg with the shipbuilders Blohm + Voss in 1929/30. A period of unemployment followed.

=== Politics, and a move to the Soviet Union ===
He joined the German Metal Workers' Union in 1923, later becoming a member of the Revolutionary Trades Union Opposition (RGO / Revolutionäre Gewerkschafts Opposition) movement. In 1931 Hofmann joined the Communist Party (KPD / Kommunistische Partei Deutschlands). In March 1931 he set off from Kiel in a kayak and succeeded in getting himself via Denmark, Sweden and Finland to Kronstadt, the principal port adjacent to Leningrad (as it was then called). He also succeeded in obtaining a residence permit in the Soviet Union. He stayed in the country for many years, resuming his work as a machinist and later in 1933 moving on to the Urals region where he became a foreman in a heavy machinery plant in Nadeschinsk (in 1939 renamed Serov). He moved again, in 1933, to Swerdlowsk taking another job in production management at a heavy machinery plant, remaining here till 1937. In 1938 he was working as an assembly shop foreman at the iron and steel complex at Tagilstroyevsky in the northern part of Nizhny Tagil. However, he was then targeted in one of the Stalinist purges: he was arrested in February 1938 and taken to Moscow where he spent eleven months in custody. He was released on 15 January 1939 and readmitted to the Communist Party.

In 1943 and 1944 Hofmann underwent a period of special training at the Communist Party Academy in Pushkino, a short distance to the north-east of Moscow. After that he was sent initially to the Prisoner of War camps at Uman in Ukraine as a representative of the Soviet backed National Committee for a Free Germany (NKFD / Nationalkomitee Freies Deutschland). In August 1944 Hofmann was parachuted into the Częstochowa region, after which he served as a member of the "Andreas Hofer" reconnaissance group in Poland, but by March 1945 he had been recalled to Moscow, probably at the instigation of Anton Ackermann.

During the closing days of the war, right at the end of April 1945, thirty men divided into three teams of ten German Communist Party members arrived by air from Moscow in what was shortly to become the Soviet occupation zone of Germany. The existence of these teams only became known in 1955 when a disillusioned team member moved to the west, became an academic published a book entitled "Die Revolution entläßt ihre Kinder" ("The revolution lets its children go"). Developments during and after 1945 in what now developed into the German Democratic Republic suggest that the team members, all of whom had spent the war years in Moscow, had planned in some detail for the Soviet military administration to become the basis for an ambitious nation building mission. Artur Hofmann was a member of the ten man group headed up by Anton Ackermann. During April 1945 he was in Moscow, participating in training that prepared him for a return to Germany.

=== Return to (East) Germany ===
The Ackermann team arrived in Saxony in the southern part of the Soviet occupation zone at the start of May 1945. Between 2 and 8 May Artur Hofmann was able to travel to the principal Saxon cities such as Dresden and Leipzig and he was also able, with Herbert Oehler, to get to Görlitz on 13 May 1945. They were presented to representatives of the Görlitz townsfolk by the Soviet military commander as "Representatives of General Seyslitz's Liberation Movement". This signaled the start of Hofmann's career as a regional politician. Oehler began to build up a city police force while Hofmann became the link man between the city council and the Soviet commander, becoming deputy mayor as part of the process. He supervised the return of various factories, businesses, food stores and livestock that had been seized by the occupation forces. He also recorded numerous complaints from the citizens of Görlitz of rape and plunder by Soviet and Polish troops. However, he rarely succeeded in progressing these complaints because the military commander of the city failed to provide him with the necessary support.

=== Regional administration and politics ===
During May and the first part of June 1945 Hofmann and Oehler traveled extensively across occupied Saxony, taking over 31 city and district councils. At the same time police patrols across the territory were implemented. Between 16 June and October 1945 Hofmann's appointments included the deputy administratorship of the Görlitz district with responsibilities that included personnel matters. In October 1945 Artur Hofmann was appointed Chief of Police for Saxony.

On 2 July 1949 Artur Hofmann was appointed Minister of the Interior in the Saxony regional government, under Max Seydewitz. He held the same position on the second Seydewitz cabinet between 1950 and 1952. However, the regional tier of government was suspended in July 1952 as part of a larger administrative reform which saw powers redistributed to the centre or to more local bodies. This put an end to the regional government in Saxony. Hofmann now became deputy chairman of the newly created Dresden district council.

=== Ministry for State Security ===
In July 1953 Hofmann switched to working for the Ministry for State Security (The Stasi) which involved relocating from Saxony to Berlin. It seems likely that this career move was not unconnected with the expansion in Stasi activity which quickly followed in the wake of the June uprisings. In or before 1954 he had already become a colonel in the Stasi, a rank and position that he would retain till 1970. At the end of 1953 he took charge in the Ministry's "Central Division III", with responsibility for economic matters, and in succession to Reinhold Knoppe.

Following difficulties in 1956 the Party Central Committee decided on 9 February 1957 that yet closer links were needed between the Ministry for State Security and The Party. In pursuance of this objective Hofmann, in March 1957, acquired the title Officer on Special Assignment, which essentially involved a senior liaison function with the Security Department of Party's Central Committee.

In 1960 Hofmann was badly ill and away from work for some time, but he survived and in October 1960 became the executive assistant head of the important Dresden district Ministry for State Security. He finally retired in 1970 and went to live in Eichwalde on the south-eastern edge of Berlin.

== Awards and honours ==
- 1955 Patriotic Order of Merit in Bronze
- 1960 Banner of Labor
- 1967 Patriotic Order of Merit in Gold
- 1977 Patriotic Order of Merit Gold clasp
- 1982 Order of Karl Marx
