= Radio Berlin International =

1959–1990 East German international radio broadcaster

- Type: Radio broadcasting
- Country: East Germany
- Availability: International
- Launch date: May 9 1959; 67 years ago
- Dissolved: 31 December 1991; 35 years ago
- Replaced by: Deutsche Welle

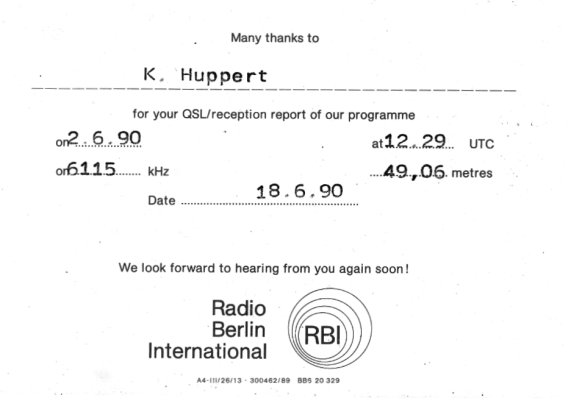
A Radio Berlin International QSL card

Radio Berlin International was the international broadcasting arm for the German Democratic Republic's (GDR) Rundfunk der DDR (Radio of the GDR) broadcasting service. Radio Berlin International (RBI) was one of the major international broadcasters of the Cold War era.

== History ==
Radio Berlin International was founded in May 1959 to counter the influence of the newly-formed Deutsche Welle, the West German international broadcaster. Much of the RBI's media output was focused on propagandized news reports and information about the GDR. RBI offered a state-sponsored view on life in a socialist country to nations around the world. The purpose of RBI's mission was two-fold. In accordance with state prerogatives, RBI was charged with spreading Marxist-Leninist ideology around the globe. In addition, RBI's broadcasts sought to establish international recognition of East Germany as a legitimate state by distributing large quantities of colourful and professionally-produced publicity material about life in the GDR to its listeners across the world. As a result of its international focus, RBI's content schedule was flexible, often changing depending on which world events offered the greatest returns for socialist propaganda.

Due to the international, multilingual nature of their broadcasting, RBI staff were able to more freely discuss prohibited content because their superiors were rarely able to understand foreign languages, such as such as Swahili and Arabic. From 1955 to 1975, RBI broadcast in 17 different languages, the most popular of which were English, French, and Arabic. By 1976 RBI was producing 338 hours of weekly content for an international audience. Of these 338 hours, Western and Eastern Europe consumed 175 hours of airtime, followed by Sub-Saharan Africa with 79 hours, North Africa and the Middle East taking up 53 hours, Latin America with 46 hours, and North America and East Asia both assuming 26 hours each.

RBI broadcasting initially used 50-kilowatt transmitters located at Leipzig, Königs-Wusterhausen, and Nauen. In 1964, RBI's system at Nauen built by the state enterprises VEB Funkwerk Berlin Köpenick and VEB Industrieprojekte featured rotatable, tiltable antennas under remote control and able to handle 200 KW of power, making RBI the second most powerful shortwave service in the Soviet bloc. From 1971-1981, the Nauen station was further upgraded with three 500-kilowatt transmitters - one imported from the Swiss company Brown, Boveri & Cie, two from Russia. The studios were based in a former furniture factory at Nalepastraße in East Berlin, next to the river Spree.

RBI continued to operate during the period between the fall of the Berlin Wall in November 1989 and German reunification on October 3, 1990. During this time, with a newly-obsolete state agenda, RBI's editors and staff were free to critique the now-defunct GDR, albeit still from an East German perspective. RBI aired its final broadcast on October 2, 1990, one day before German reunification formally dissolved the GDR by accession to the Federal Republic of Germany. The final broadcast was noted for the bitterness among RBI staff, some of whom resented its "takeover", rather than "unification," with Deutsche Welle. The last words (for the last English broadcast, at 36:48 of the reference) were by Robert Mitchell, "Take care and good luck", followed by The Doors' "The End".

== See also ==
- Rundfunk der DDR
- Eastern Bloc information dissemination
