= Rolf Gumlich =

Rolf Gumlich is a German journalist and author of screenplays.

From 1954 to 1989 Gumlich worked at the Rundfunk der DDR (Radio of the GDR). He is well known for his serial medical dramas such as Frauenarzt Dr. Markus Merthin and Für alle Fälle Stefanie.

== Sources ==
- P. Conley: "Das Kaninchen und die Schlange. Der Blick auf 'den Westen' im DDR-Feature." Deutschland Archiv, vol. 34, no. 6 (2001): pp. 998–1007. "Es ist vor allem Rolf Gumlich, einer der vier fest angestellten Autoren der Feature-Abteilung, der in zahlreichen Kultursendungen des Hörfunks das Bild von der Bundesrepublik prägte." ["It is above all Rolf Gumlich, one of the four permanent authors in the feature department, who shaped the image of the Federal Republic in numerous radio cultural broadcasts."]
