= Horst Kutscher =

German coal apprentice and the 36th person to die

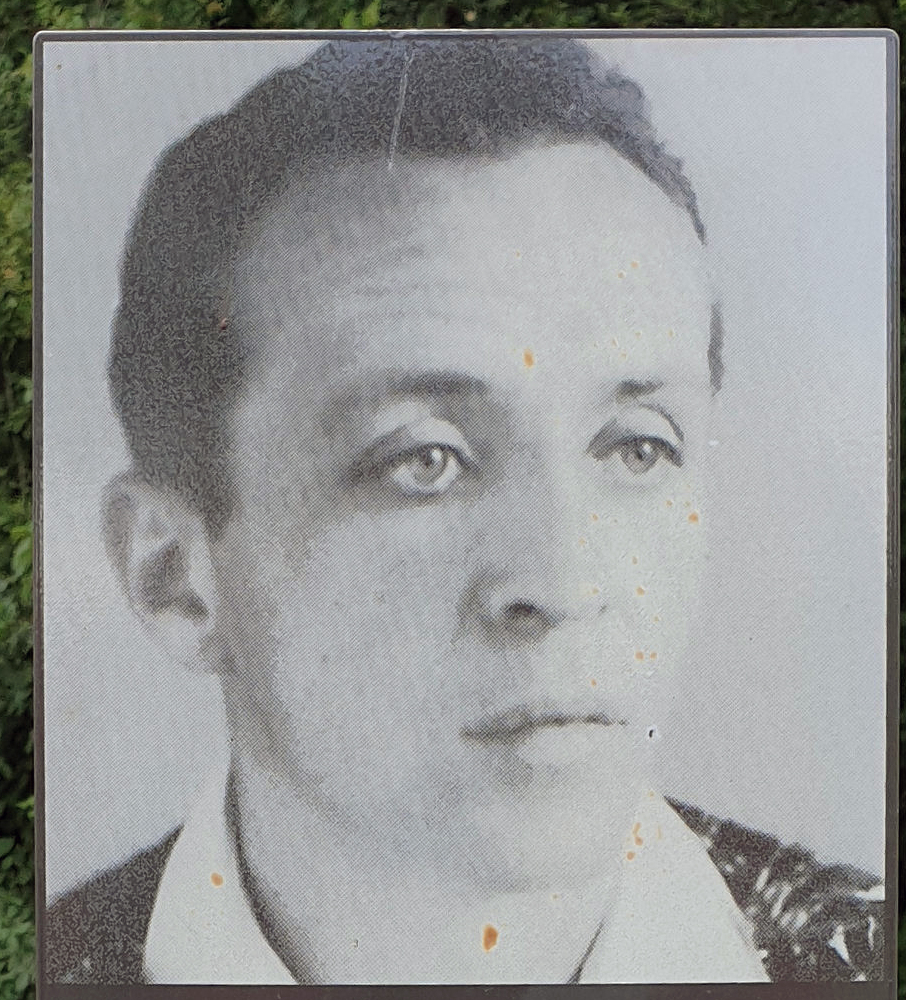
- Born: Horst Kutscher; July 5, 1931; Berlin, Germany
- Died: January 15, 1963 (aged 31); Rudowerstrasse, border between Treptow, East Berlin, East Germany and Neukölln, West Berlin, West Germany
- Occupation(s): auto mechanic, informant, construction worker, coal merchant
- Known for: being shot while escaping East Germany

Horst Kutscher (July 5, 1931 – January 15, 1963) was a German coal apprentice and the 36th person to die trying to cross the Berlin Wall from East Berlin to West Berlin.

== Early life ==
Kutscher was born on July 5, 1931, in Treptow, the fourth of 13 children to a mechanical engineer and a flower seller.

== Biography ==
In April 1956, he fled to West Germany, with his wife and children later following him. A year later, he and his family returned to Berlin-Treptow. He worked as a "border-crosser" in the West until the border was closed in August 1961.

== Death ==
On January 15, 1963, at the border near Rudower Strasse at the sector border between Berlin-Treptow and Berlin-Neukölln, Kutscher slid under the barbed-wire fence and then along the security trenches with 25 meters left when he was fatally shot in the head.

After the collapse of East Germany, Kutscher’s ex-wife was a witness in the trial against the guard who shot Kutscher. In August 1997, the former guard was sentenced to one year and three months' probation.

== See also ==
- List of deaths at the Berlin Wall
- Berlin Crisis of 1961
