= Radio DDR 2 =

Radio station in East Germany

Radio DDR

Radio DDR 2 (English: Radio GDR 2) was a radio channel in East Germany run by Rundfunk der DDR, created in October 1958. It was a regional service in the morning and at 01:00 local time, broadcast centralized classical music and radio plays produced in Berlin. Since this was a regional service, it used mostly FM broadcasting, with some minor AM broadcasting repeaters near Senftenberg.
