= Cross border commuters in the Berlin area 1948–1961 =

Aspect of life in divided Berlin

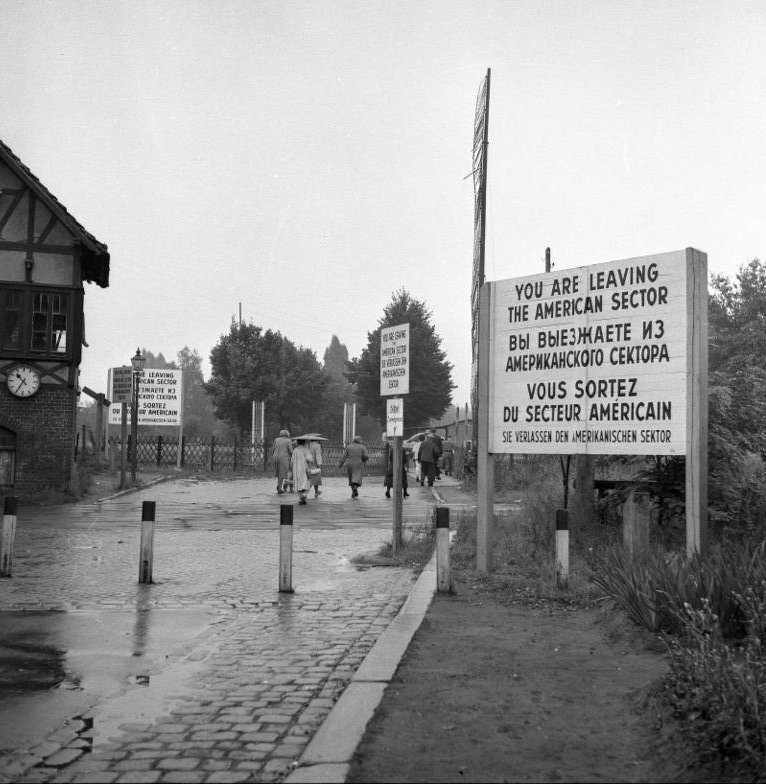
Border commuters at Berlin S-Bahnhof Düppel, on the southern border of West Berlin and the Brandenburg district of the GDR (1955).

The problem with cross-border commuters (German, Grenzgänger) in the Berlin area was a result of the political separation of East- and West Berlin in the years of 1948 and 1949. It resulted from the affiliations of the municipalities to two different currencies; East Berlin districts would use the East German mark (Mark der DDR), and West Berlin districts would use the German mark (DM). Another cause was the difference is residential and industrial areas throughout Berlin, with the western districts being more prosperous. The Socialist Unity Party (SED), which governed East Berlin, used the matter of cross-border commuters in its propaganda, citing them as a problem, which helped them to justify the construction of the Berlin Wall, starting in August 1961.

== Emergence ==
Following the introduction of the German Mark in the western sectors of Berlin, and the East German Mark in the Soviet Sector of Berlin, as well as the Soviet Occupation Zone (which completed the surrounding of West Berlin in areas which were not bordered by East Berlin), about 122,000 West Berliners were employed in East Berlin or the surrounding Berlin area, where they were paid in East German Marks (East cross-border commuters), while 76,000 East Berliners worked in the western Sectors of Berlin (West cross-border commuters), where initially, in the first months, they were paid in (West) German Marks, in accordance with a general payment ceiling. Because the exchange rate of 1:4 (1 German Mark to 4 East German Marks), meaning the German Mark had about four times the purchasing power of the East German Mark, the future existence of the wages of more than 120,000 West Berlin households was at risk.

== Settlement through the Wage Compensation Fund ==
In order to be able to maintain a uniform Berlin employment market, on March 20, 1949, in addition the elimination of the payment ceiling, Western powers, together with the abolition of the capping limit, created a Wage Compensation Fund for employees of the industrial/business economy. This would mean that the East cross-border commuters could exchange 60% of their wages, which were paid in East German Marks, to (West) German Marks at the rate of 1:1 once back in West Berlin, while the West cross-border commuters were only paid 10% of their income in German Marks, and 90% of their income in East German Marks.

The problem of East cross-border commuters, who were employed in positions of authority, or as police officers or teachers, was solved in 1948 and 49 during the political dividing of Berlin. They were only allowed to keep their jobs if they moved their residence to the Eastern sector of Berlin. They were not included in the Wage Compensation Fund in the Western sectors anyway.

On the other hand, the SED failed to accomplish a corresponding reduction in the number of West cross-border commuters, . Apart from a brief slump around 1954, until the construction of the Berlin Wall in 1961, it was always around 40,000 to 60,000. Pressure on these cross-border commuters came by means of disadvantages in the allocation of housing, children's training opportunities and the issuance of travel permits. An arbitrary interpretation of the foreign exchange regulations by the SED, up to the imposition of imprisonment, did not lead to the abandonment of their jobs in West Berlin, but instead, in more than 50,000 cases, it led to these commuters fleeing to the west permanently. Nevertheless, the number of West cross-border commuters did not decrease significantly. Because of the reduction of the East cross-border commuters, the Wage Compensation Fund was able to continually increase the pay rate to the West cross-border commuters. By August 1961, it was up from 10% when first established to 40% in August 1961, with a maximum exchange limit of DM 275. The acceptance of a job in West Berlin was attractive because of access to the high-quality goods in contrast to what was available in East Berlin, and the favorable exchange rate from (West) German Marks to East German Marks, despite its legal uncertainty.

In addition to the cross-border commuters that were legally registered in the East and West Berlin employment markets, West cross-border commuters who were worked in black market jobs existed, particularly in the cleaning, transportation, and catering industries. Their employment was illegal, irregular, paid hourly, and had a low economic significance with anywhere from 8,000 to 20,000 workers, who were often retirees.

== The SED's solution of the problem ==
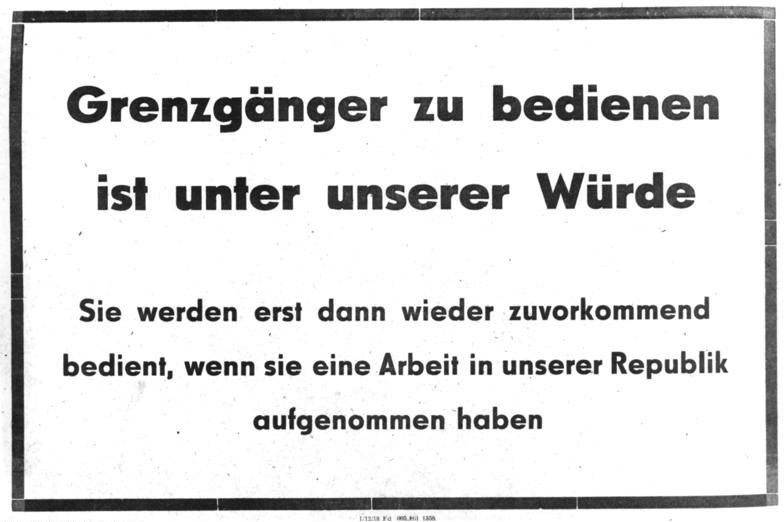
Poster addressing the problem of East Germans working in West Berlin. This poster was hung in shops the Königs Wusterhausen area (1961).

In 1961, when fleeing the republic became more and more frequent, the SED passed legislation closing the West Berlin borders, and by unleashing a witch-hunt for West cross-border commuters for propagandist reasons, portraying them in public events and a press campaign as traitors, criminals and parasites. A series of new regulations, effective as of August 1, 1961, made the West cross-border commuters virtually impossible to continue their employment in West Berlin.

However, before these provisions could fully take effect, the SED removed the problem of cross-border commuting in the Berlin area by building the Berlin Wall on 13 August 1961. At this time, there were still 12,000 East cross-border commuters employed in East Berlin, including 6,000 at the Deutsche Reichsbahn (East German Railways). The rest were mostly active as artists (70% of the soloistic staff of the Deutsche Staatsoper on Unter den Linden were West Berliners), or as scientists, technicians or doctors. Because of the absence of payments made by East cross-border commuters, the Wage Compensation Fund had to adjust its payments to the East cross-border commuters; they were faced with the alternatives of giving up their jobs in the east, or migrating to the east. Only a few chose to resettle in the east. Because those with such skills were difficult for the GDR government to obtain, their workplaces went unfilled. The SED would accept this disadvantage in favor of the general closure of the GDR.

The West cross-border commuters, by this time unemployed, were subject to long periods of discrimination in their everyday lives, employed in workplaces below their qualifications, and kept under police surveillance.

== Notable "Grenzgänger" ==
- Horst Buchholz (1933-2003), actor.
- Bruno Doehring (1874-1961), pastor and theologian.
- Walter Felsenstein (1901-1975), theater and opera director.
- Hans Heinrich (1911-2003), film editor, screenwriter, and film director.
- Regine Hildebrandt (1941-2001), biologist and politician.
- Horst Kutscher (1931-1963) 36th known fatality at the Berlin Wall.
- Günter Litfin (1937–1961), Second known fatality at the Berlin Wall, and the first known fatality that was shot at the Berlin Wall while attempting to escape.
- Kurt Scharf (1902-1990), clergyman and bishop of the Evangelical Church in Berlin-Brandenburg.
- Wolfgang Staudte (1906-1984), film director, script writer and actor.
- Ingeborg Weber-Kellermann (1918-1993), folklorist, anthropologist, ethnologist, and academic teacher.

== Literature ==
- Frank Roggenbuch: Das Berliner Grenzgängerproblem. Verflechtung und Systemkonkurrenz vor dem Mauerbau (The Berlin Cross-Border Commuters Problem; Interdependence and System Competition Before the Construction of the Berlin Wall). Walter de Gruyter, Berlin, New York 2008, ISBN 3110203448 (Veröffentlichungen der Historischen Kommission zu Berlin Band 107).(in German)
- Erika M. Hoerning: Zwischen den Fronten. Berliner Grenzgänger und Grenzhändler 1948–1961 (Between the Fronts. Berlin Cross-Border Commuters and Border Traders 1948–1961). Böhlau, Köln, Weimar, Wien 1992, ISBN 3-412-08091-8.(in German)
- Frank Roggenbuch: Verflechtung und Systemkonkurrenz. Eine Betrachtung zum Berliner Grenzgängerproblem (Interdependence and System Competition; A consideration of the Berlin frontier problem). (PDF-Datei)(in German)
