= Radio DDR 1 =

Radio DDR1
- Germany
- Broadcast area: East Germany and parts of West Germany; Czechoslovakia; Poland
- Frequencies: 531 kHz (Leipzig), 1044 kHz (Dresden) and others

Ownership
- Owner: Government of East Germany

History
- First air date: August 16, 1953; 72 years ago
- Former names: Berlin Zweites Programm (1953-1954)

Radio DDR 1 (English: Radio GDR 1) was a radio channel produced and transmitted by Rundfunk der DDR, the radio broadcasting organization of East Germany (GDR). It had a mixed of news and light entertainment schedule, with an emphasis on events in the GDR, and also included regional programming.

== History ==
The origins of Radio DDR 1 can be traced back to August 1953. As part of a reorganization of the broadcasting system, in 1952, existing stations Deutschlandsender (part of Rundfunk der DDR since 1949), Berliner Rundfunk (founded in 1946), and Mitteldeutscher Rundfunk were placed under the state broadcasting committee.

Between June 1954 and September 1955, it was known as Berlin zweites Programm (Berlin 2nd Programme) in distinction from Berlin erstes Programm (Berlin 1st Programme), the new name for Berliner Rundfunk. It officially became known as "Radio DDR" on 11 September 1955.

The channel, which was transmitted on medium wave (531, 558, 576, 603, 729, 882, and 1044 kHz) and FM, broadcast until 1990. In April of that year it was renamed "Radio aktuell" and carried advertising for the first time.

Following German reunification, Radio aktuell's frequencies were transferred to the new public-service broadcasting organizations Mitteldeutscher Rundfunk (covering Saxony, Saxony-Anhalt, and Thuringia) and Ostdeutscher Rundfunk Brandenburg, and to the Hamburg-based Norddeutscher Rundfunk which took over as public-service broadcaster in Mecklenburg-Vorpommern.

== Programmes ==
The weekly Schlagerrevue, which ran for 36 years and was presented from 1958 by Heinz Quermann, became the world's longest-running radio hit parade. The programme's editor from 1963 to 1988 was the composer, lyricist, arranger, singer, and bandleader Siegfried Jordan.

Radio DDR 1's Sports Department employed such well known journalists as Heinz-Florian Oertel, Hubert Knobloch, Wolfgang Hempel, and Waldefried Forkefeld.

== See also ==
- Eastern Bloc information dissemination
