= Rundfunk der DDR =

Radio broadcasting organisation of the German Democratic Republic

Coordinates: 52.432°N 13.540°E

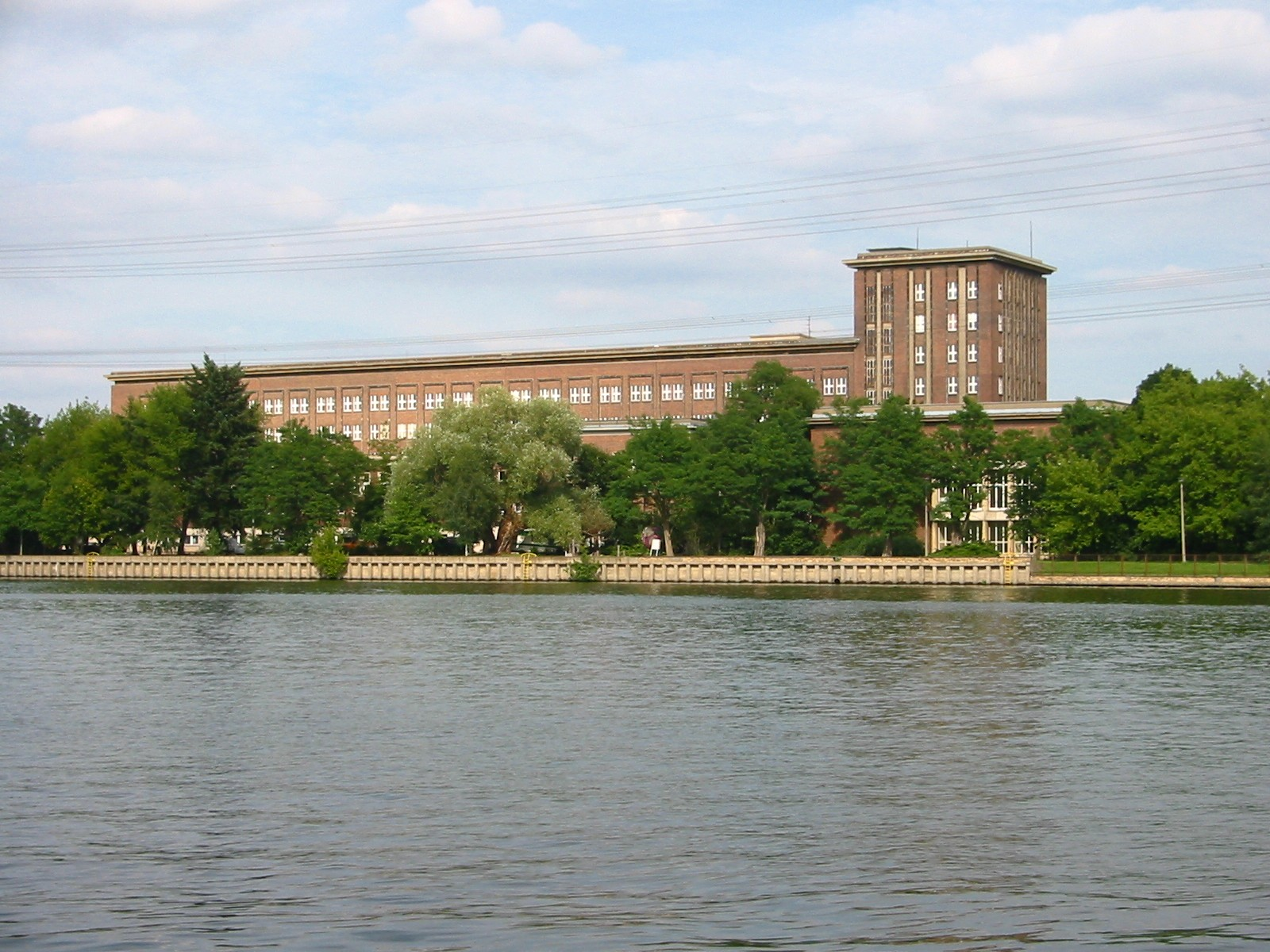
- Funkhaus Berlin building, August 2005
- Type: Broadcast radio
- Country: East Germany

History
- Launch date: 1946
- Closed: 1990

Coverage
- Availability: National; International

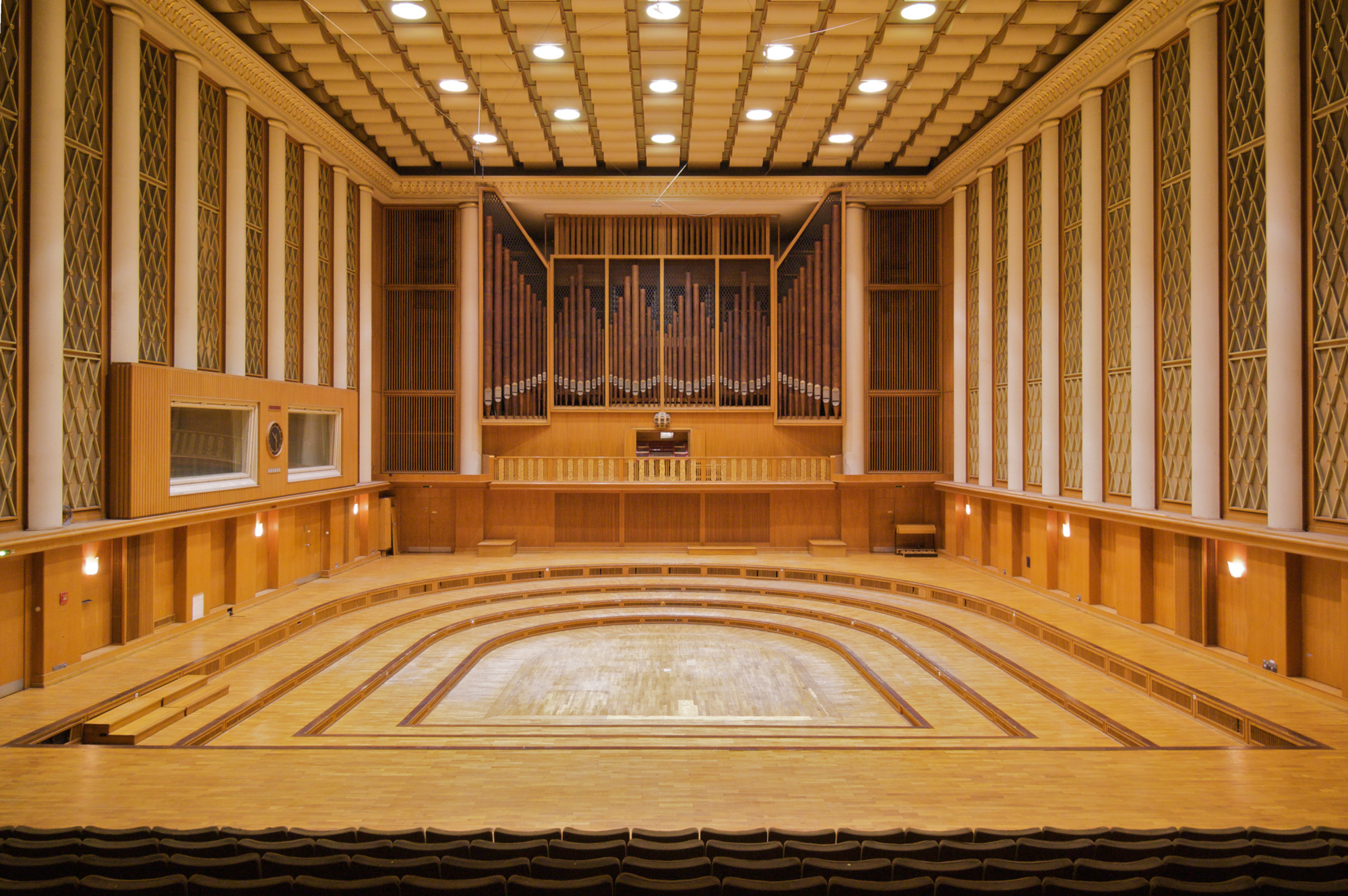
Funkhaus Berlin, Block B, large broadcasting hall

Rundfunk der DDR (German: [ˈʁʊntfʊŋk deːɐ̯ ˌdeːdeːˈʔɛʁ], 'GDR Broadcasting'; from about 1948 to 1972 Deutscher Demokratischer Rundfunk, 'German Democratic Broadcasting') was the collective designation for radio broadcasting organized by the State Broadcasting Committee in the German Democratic Republic (GDR) until German reunification in 1990.

== History ==
=== Post-war ===
The pre-war Reichssender stations, under the control of Joseph Goebbels' Reichsministerium für Volksaufklärung und Propaganda as Großdeutscher Rundfunk, were either destroyed by the Wehrmacht or closed by the Allied occupation forces upon Germany's surrender in May 1945. On 13 May 1945, the Soviet Military Administration in Germany (SMAG) began a radio broadcasting service to the people of Berlin called Berliner Rundfunk, operating from what would become the British sector of West Berlin.

For the most part the station retained staff from the Nazi era. The first broadcast included recordings of the "State Anthem of the Soviet Union," "The Star-Spangled Banner," "God Save the King," and "La Marseillaise" followed by greetings from Joseph Stalin, Winston Churchill, and Franklin D. Roosevelt. In the next few days the station focused on playing classical music by German and Russian composers such as Ludwig van Beethoven and Pyotr Ilyich Tchaikovsky alongside news. The station was controlled by the Ulbricht Group politicians Hans Mahle, Matthaus Klein, Wolfgang Leonhard, and Markus Wolf. The station began to become more ideological in tone after the Socialist Unity Party of Germany performed poorly in the 1946 Berlin state election.

From December 1945 it was meant to cover the north-eastern part of the Soviet occupation zone (territory of former Reichssender Berlin), while Mitteldeutscher Rundfunk should transmit to the south-western part (territory of former Reichssender Leipzig). Both networks were put under the control of the Zentralverwaltung für Volksbildung ("Central Administration for People's Education") and a Generalintendant (general manager) in 1946 and also provided air time for regional Landessender in the five states of the Soviet occupation zone. A Sorbian language broadcast was launched by Landessender Dresden in 1948, continued by Berlin in 1952 and by Bezirkssender Cottbus in 1957. As a third channel the East German Deutschlandsender was broadcasting for the whole of Germany.

=== Early GDR ===
The Funkhaus Berlin building was erected in 1951. It was the largest radio station in East Germany and was noted for its excellent acoustics. It was designed by the Bauhaus architect Franz Ehrlich. Because staff were working in the building 24 hours a day, it included a supermarket, an outpatients' clinic and a sauna.

After formation of the GDR in 1949 and dissolution of the states in 1952, the State Broadcasting Committee subordinate to the East German government was constituted. Originally it produced three central radio programmes called Berlin I, II and III, but soon the first two channels were named Berliner Rundfunk and Deutschlandsender again, while the third channel became Radio DDR. Regional outlets were reintroduced as Bezirkssender for the new districts.

In 1955 an external service was launched, becoming Radio Berlin International in 1959. For Eastern Germany Radio DDR 2 started in October 1958.

=== Iron Curtain and Berlin Wall ===
The increase in hours of output from Rundfunk der DDR between 1965 and 1989

In February 1958 a second channel of Berliner Rundfunk was introduced especially for West Berlin to tackle RIAS (a United States Information Agency outlet) and Sender Freies Berlin (SFB, the local outlet of the West German broadcasting consortium ARD). It was renamed Berliner Welle in 1959.

The GDR also instituted a programme of jamming foreign signals, both shortwave broadcasts from international broadcasters such as the BBC World Service and local broadcasts such as RIAS. A network of jamming stations was built covering the entire country. However, jamming RIAS broadcasts was discontinued in 1978 due to the Geneva Frequency Plan of 1975 signed also by East Germany. The diplomatic prestige gained through recognition by the Western signatories was more important to the GDR leadership than continuing jamming, which furthermore had already been proven inefficient.

Listening to or watching Western broadcasts in itself was legally tolerated, but communicating received content to others or inviting others to common reception could lead to penal sanctions for an offense called "incitement endangering the state" (staatsgefährdende Hetze). After the construction of the Berlin Wall in August 1961, the Freie Deutsche Jugend (Free German Youth), the official youth movement in the GDR, started the campaign "Blitz kontra NATO-Sender" ("Lightning against NATO's transmitters") to encourage young people to remove or turn away aerials pointing at Ochsenkopf Transmitter in Bavaria, West Germany.

In 1964 most Bezirkssender shared frequencies with Radio DDR 2, the districts adjacent to Berlin (Potsdam and Frankfurt/Oder) with Berliner Rundfunk. Special regional broadcasts included Ferienwelle during summer holiday season from Rostock and Messewelle twice a year during trade fair from Leipzig. In 1968 the State Committee for Television was split from the State Broadcasting Committee whose name was slightly changed to State Committee for Broadcasting. In 1972 Deutschlandsender and Berliner Welle were merged to form Stimme der DDR ("Voice of the GDR").

In 1981, a further attempt was made to draw GDR radio listeners - especially the young - from Western broadcasts by launching a youth radio station, DT64. By 1985 there were 6,646,500 licensed radios in the country, or 39.9 for every 100 persons.

=== After the fall of the Wall ===
After the fall of the Berlin Wall in November 1989, Stimme der DDR was renamed Deutschlandsender again, soon merged with Radio DDR 2 to become Deutschlandsender Kultur. The Bezirkssender were transformed to regional stations for the five newly developing states using the frequencies of former Radio DDR 2. Radio DDR 1 was renamed Radio aktuell.

Upon reunification in October 1990, the first station to cease broadcasting was Radio Berlin International. All other programmes were continued under the roof of the "Institution according to Article 36 of the Unification Treaty". In 1992 two new public broadcasters (ORB in the east and MDR in the south) were created, and two existing West German public broadcasters expanded their coverage areas (NDR from the north of the Federal Republic to the north of the whole country, and SFB from West Berlin to the entire city). They took over the frequencies of the regional stations, Radio aktuell and Berliner Rundfunk; Berliner Rundfunk itself became a local private broadcaster in Berlin. DT64 was continued by MDR until May 1993, Deutschlandsender Kultur by ARD and ZDF until merging with RIAS to constitute DeutschlandRadio Berlin in 1994.

== Broadcast hours ==
Year	1965	1970	1975	1980	1985	1988	1989
Spoken word	32217	36866	32479	35435	38221	46033	48428
Music	31499	31131	29706	31583	33804	48112	48953
Total	63716	67997	62185	67018	72025	94145	97381
Hours per week	1222	1304	1193	1282	1381	1800	1868

== Stations ==
East German radio programmes, timeline 1945–1990/93

=== Domestic ===
- Radio DDR 1 – information and discussion (1955–1990/91).
- Radio DDR 2 – culture and education (1958–1990), with regional programmes in the morning (Bezirkssender).
- Berliner Rundfunk – station focusing on East Berlin (1945–1952, 1955–1991).
- DT64 – the station for young people (1981–1993).
- Sorbischer Rundfunk – Sorbian language programme (1948–1991).
- Ferienwelle – a holiday radio service broadcast on the Baltic coast from May to September (1967–1993).
- Messewelle – a West-oriented station broadcast during the week-long Leipzig Trade Fair in March and September (1971–1991?).

=== International ===
- Radio Berlin International – the foreign-language service (1955/59–1990).
- Deutschlandsender – the "all-German" service (1948–1952, 1953–1971 and 1990–1993).
- Berliner Welle – the eastern service for West Berlin (1958/59–1971).
- Stimme der DDR – "Voice of the GDR", the German language international service, formed from Deutschlandsender and Berliner Welle (1971–1990).

=== Clandestine stations ===
- Deutscher Freiheitssender 904 – "German Liberty Radio", aimed at West German listeners (1956–1971)
- Deutscher Soldatensender 935 – "German Soldiers Radio", aimed at West German armed forces (1960–1972)
- "Voice of the Immigrants" – Aimed at "Guest workers" from Greece and Turkey in West Germany/Berlin (1970's)
- Radio Vltava – aimed for listeners in Czechoslovakia (1968–1969)

=== Soviet broadcasts ===
The Soviet Union maintained a service for its troops on GDR soil, "Radio Wolga", which broadcast on 261 kHz longwave. The Soviet foreign service was broadcast from East Germany on 1323 kHz mediumwave. Radio Wolga was closed when the last Soviet troops left German soil.

At Soviet military barracks, Programme 1 of Soviet television was transmitted on low power for the soldiers, in a similar way to the highly localised broadcasts of AFN, SSVC, CFN and the French FFB in the west. The last Russian transmitter was closed in 1994.

== See also ==
- German Broadcasting Archive
- Rundfunk im amerikanischen Sektor (RIAS)
- Radio Wolga
- Deutscher Fernsehfunk Television service
- Eastern Bloc information dissemination
- Culture of East Germany
- Rolf Gumlich

== Bibliography ==
- Klaus Arnold; Christoph Classen (eds.): Zwischen Pop und Propaganda. Radio in der DDR. Berlin: Ch. Links, 2004. ISBN 3-86153-343-X. Online
- Ingrid Pietrzynski (ed.): Das Schriftgut des DDR-Hörfunks. Eine Bestandsübersicht. Potsdam-Babelsberg: DRA, 2002. ISBN 3-926072-99-7. Online
- Sibylle Bolik: Das Hörspiel in der DDR. Frankfurt [u.a.]: Lang, 1994. ISBN 3-631-46955-1. Online
- Ingrid Scheffler (ed.): Literatur im DDR-Hörfunk. Günter Kunert - Bitterfelder Weg - Radio-Feature. Konstanz: UVK, 2005. ISBN 3-89669-478-2. Online
- Patrick Conley: Der parteiliche Journalist. Die Geschichte des Radio-Features in der DDR. Berlin: Metropol, 2012. ISBN 978-3-86331-050-9
- Georg Dannenberg: Sozialistischer Rundfunkjournalismus. 2nd edition. Leipzig: Karl-Marx-Universität, 1978
