= Haus des Rundfunks =

Radio broadcasting centre in Berlin, Germany

Coordinates: 52°30′30″N 13°16′33″E

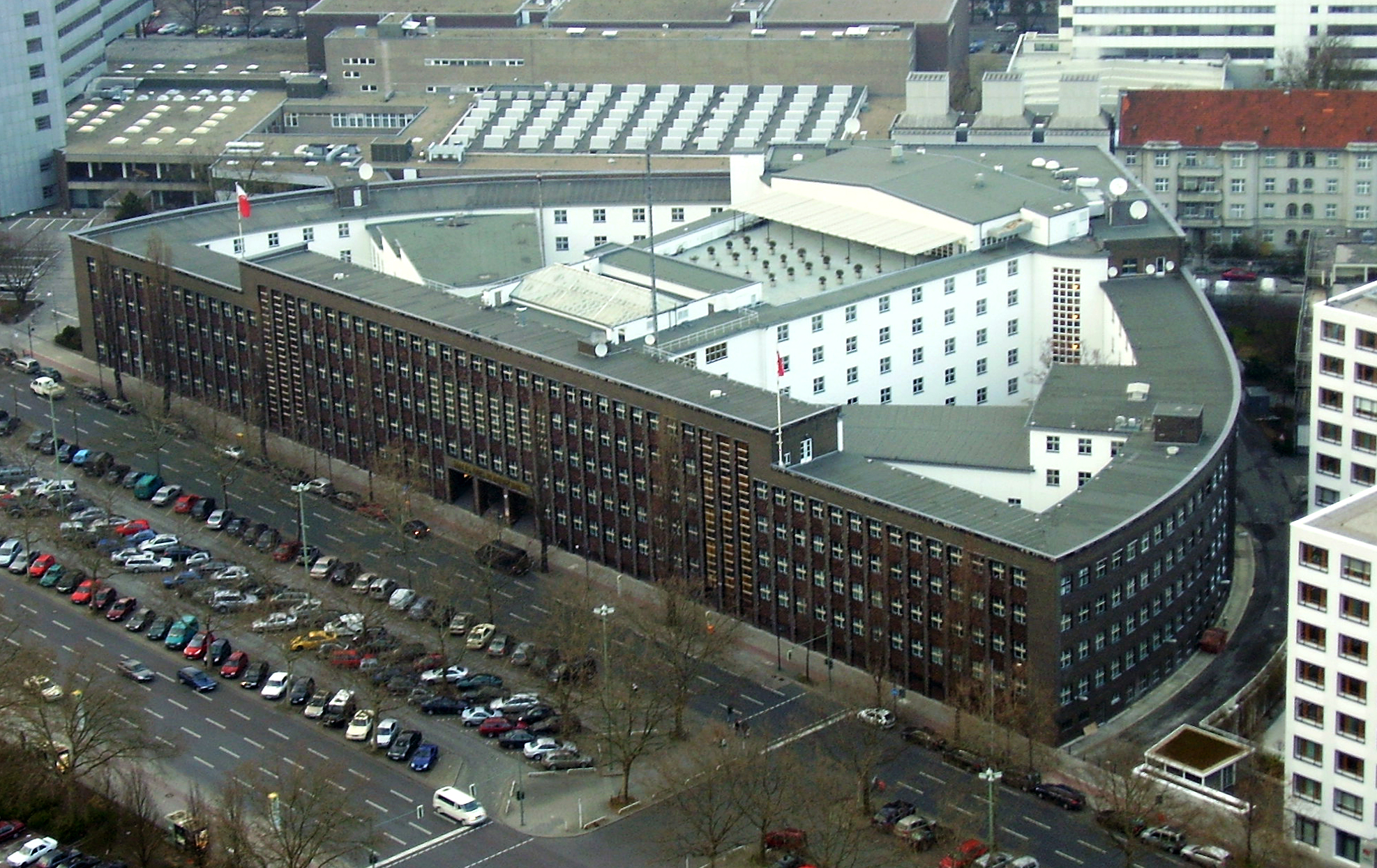

General information
- Architectural style: New Objectivity
- Location: Westend, Masurenallee 8-14, 14057 Berlin, Germany
- Construction started: 1929
- Completed: 1930

Design and construction
- Architect: Hans Poelzig

The Haus des Rundfunks (transl. Broadcasting House), located in the Westend district of Berlin, the capital city of Germany, is the world's oldest self-contained broadcasting centre. Designed by Hans Poelzig in 1929 after he won an architectural competition, the building contains three large centrally located broadcasting spaces, which are shielded from street noise by the surrounding office wings. It is used today by local ARD broadcaster Rundfunk Berlin-Brandenburg (RBB) to make programmes carried by its Inforadio, Kulturradio, and Radio Berlin 88,8 channels. The building's large broadcasting spaces are occasionally also used to host concerts.

== History ==
The building, the ground plan of which is a triangle with two curved sides and a 150 m long (490 ft) straight façade clad with ceramic tiles, was constructed between 1929 and 1930 and inaugurated on 22 January 1931 as the seat of the Reichs-Rundfunk-Gesellschaft. The large, central broadcasting space was finished in 1933. On 22 March 1935 the first regular television service in Germany Fernsehsender Paul Nipkow was begun here, but moved to a separate building on nearby Theodor-Heuss-Platz in 1937. The Haus des Rundfunks also had an important influence on the development of stereophonic sound and its adoption by radio broadcasting. Some radio programming continued during the war, notably the Wunschkonzert für die Wehrmacht (lit. 'Request Concert for the Armed Forces'), broadcast from the Haus des Rundfunks on Sunday afternoons from 1939 to 1941.

After World War II, the Haus des Rundfunks became something of a Cold War issue: although situated in the British Sector of West Berlin, it was used by the Berliner Rundfunk radio station, which was controlled by the Soviet occupation forces, until the station moved to East Berlin in 1952. The building was not handed over to the West Berlin mayor Otto Suhr by the Soviet military command until 5 July 1956. After considerable renovation work, it was used from the end of 1957 as the home of Sender Freies Berlins, which merged on 1 May 2003 with Rundfunk Berlin-Brandenburg.

== The building ==
The Haus des Rundfunks was one of the first buildings in Europe dedicated solely to broadcasting and is exceeded in age only by the Funkhaus München. It is thus especially noteworthy that the building still offers ideal conditions for broadcast production today. At the time, Hans Poelzig had almost no examples to emulate but he developed ideas which are still valid today: the office and editorial rooms are located in the outer areas of the building, thereby surrounding the three large studio complexes. The largest broadcasting space is the heart of the building, and as well as this there is also a smaller broadcasting room and an area which, with its diversity of acoustic characteristics, is used for the production of radio drama.

Poelzig put a great deal of thought into the acoustic properties of the studios. The chairs in the large broadcasting space were specially designed so that seats had the same sound-absorbing qualities whether occupied or not. In the smaller broadcasting room a hundred wall panels could be flipped. One side of the panels absorbed sound, the other reflected it. In this way very different reverberation effects could be achieved.
