= Berliner Rundfunk =

Germany
- Broadcast area: East Germany and parts of West Germany, Czechoslovakia, Poland
- Frequency: 91.4 MHz

Programming
- Format: Classic hits

Ownership
- Owner: Government of East Germany

History
- Former names: Berlin erstes Programm, Berlin 1
- Former frequencies: 999 kHz (Hoyerswerda); 1170 kHz (Reichenbach); 1575 kHz (Dresden) and others

Links
- Webcast: On website
- Website: berliner-rundfunk.de

The Berliner Rundfunk (BERU) was a radio station set in East Germany. The station formerly had a political focus and discussed events in East Berlin. Nowadays, it is a commercial radio station with a classic hits music format with the name "Berliner Rundfunk 91.4".

== History ==
The Berliner Rundfunk was established in 1945 by the Soviet Military Administration in Germany. It initially broadcast from the Haus des Rundfunks building of the former Reichs-Rundfunk-Gesellschaft (Reich-Radio Association) GmbH on Masurenallee in Berlin-Charlottenburg. It is notable that this broadcaster was located in the British sector of what was to become West Berlin. The station was merged with the regional broadcasters in Potsdam and Schwerin as well as the broadcast studio in Rostock.

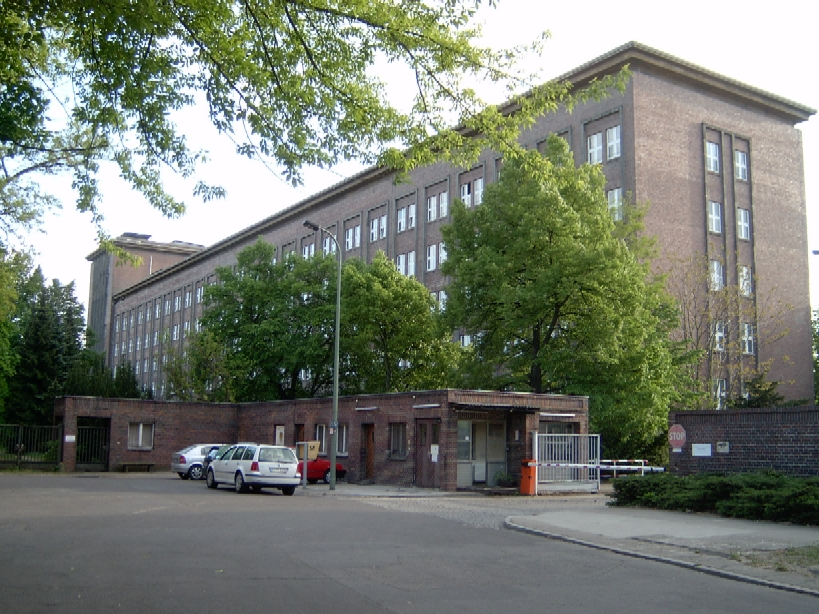
Funkhaus Nalepastraße, 2006 condition

In the course of the centralization of the German Democratic Republic (GDR) in 1952, in which among other things five Länder were eliminated, the status of East German radio changed. In the meantime, the new radio headquarters of the Rundfunk der DDR was established in Funkhaus Berlin on Nalepastraße in Oberschöneweide, East Berlin. After 1952, all radio programs in the GDR emanated from there. The Berliner Rundfunk was changed to the program Berlin I with a political focus and allotted the transmitters in Schwerin and Weimar. The program also took over the shortwave transmission of the previous Deutschlandsender.

In August 1953 the radio system was reorganized. This reform created the Deutschlandsender, the Berliner Rundfunk, and the Radio DDR. From June 1954 until September 1955 the program of the Berliner Rundfunk was temporarily called "Berlin 1. Programm" in contrast to the program of Radio DDR which was called "Berlin 2. Programm."

The Berliner Rundfunk transmitted its program set over mediumwave (657, 693, 999, 1170, 1431 and 1575 kHz) and VHF.

In connection with the unification of the two German states, the Berliner Rundfunk ceased its transmission in February 1990. In Berlin an identically named private radio program broadcast on the VHF frequency 91.4 MHz. The other open frequencies of the Berliner Rundfunk were taken over by regional programs of the newly created Länder.

== See also ==
- Broadcasting in East Germany
- Eastern Bloc information dissemination
