= Schweriner Volkszeitung =

German newspaper in Mecklenburg-Vorpommern

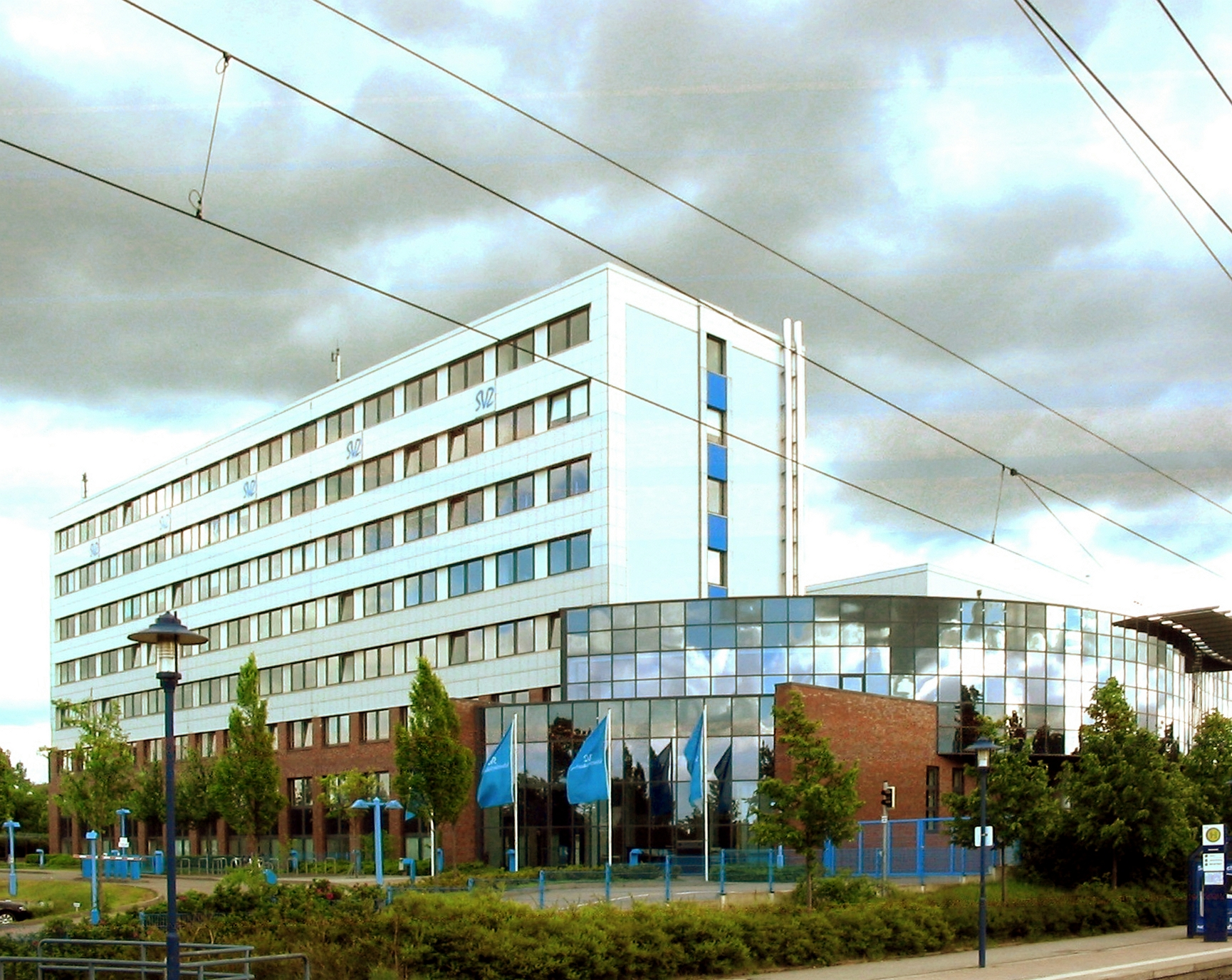
Head office

The Schweriner Volkszeitung (SVZ) is a newspaper in Germany. The controlling company, Zeitungsverlag Schwerin GmbH & Co. KG, has its head office in Schwerin, Mecklenburg-Vorpommern. The paper was a regional media outlet of the ruling party, Socialist Unity Party of Germany, in the East Germany. During this period the editor-in-chief was Hans Mahle.

== See also ==
- Norddeutsche Neueste Nachrichten
