= Interval signal =

Characteristic sound used in broadcasting

Historical interval signal of the BBC

RAVAG interval signal, clock ticking 270/min (9 in 2 sec)

An interval signal, or tuning signal, is a characteristic sound or musical phrase used in international broadcasting, numbers stations, and by some domestic broadcasters, played before commencement or during breaks in transmission, but most commonly between programs in different languages.

It serves several purposes:

- It helps a listener using a radio with an analog tuner to find the correct frequency.
- It informs other stations that the frequency is in use.
- It serves as a station identifier even if the language used in the subsequent broadcast is not one the listener understands.

The practice began in Europe in the 1920s and 1930s and was carried over into shortwave broadcasts. The use of interval signals has declined with the advent of digital tuning systems, but has not vanished. Interval signals were not required on commercial channels in the United States, where jingles were used as identification.

== List of interval signals by station ==
=== Recent ===
Interval signals
Radio station	Playable sound
(Abkhazia) Abkhazian State Television and Radio Broadcasting Company:	
(Afghanistan) Voice of Sharia:	https://www.intervalsignals.net/sounds/afg-z-voice_of_sharia_external_090600.mp3
BFBS Akrotiri and Dhekelia:	
(Åland) Ålands Radio och TV:	
(Algeria) Radio Algiers:	https://www.intervalsignals.net/sounds/alg-z-radio_algiers_c1996.mp3
Radio Andorra:	https://www.intervalsignals.net/sounds/and-z-radio_andorra_311225.mp3
Rádio Nacional de Angola:	Rádio Nacional de Angola
Radio Anguilla:	
(Antigua and Barbuda) ABS Radio:	https://www.intervalsignals.net/sounds/atg-abs_161001.mp3
Radiodifusión Argentina al Exterior: First eight notes of "Mi Buenos Aires querido" by Carlos Gardel, followed by people saying the station's name in eight languages.	
(Armenia) Radio Yerevan:	https://www.intervalsignals.net/sounds/arm-radio_yerevan_300707.mp3
TeleAruba Audio:	
(Ascension Island) Radio Ascension:	
(Azerbaijan) Radio Baku:	https://www.intervalsignals.net/sounds/aze-z-radio_baku_th_1075.mp3
(The Bahamas) Radio Bahamas:	https://www.intervalsignals.net/sounds/bah-bcb_radio_bahamas_090518.mp3
Radio Bahrain:	https://www.intervalsignals.net/sounds/bhr-radio_bahrain_english_service_150102.mp3
Bangladesh Betar: A tune composed by Samar Das.	
(Barbados) CBC The One 98.1:	https://www.intervalsignals.net/sounds/brb-cbc_theone98p1_171011.mp3
Radio Belarus: "Motherland, my dear" (Belarusian: be:Радзіма мая дарагая, Russian: Родина моя дорогая) by Vladimir Olovnikov and Ales Bachyla.	
Radio Belize:	https://www.intervalsignals.net/sounds/blz-z-radio_belize_fdxa_c1980.mp3
Radio Benin:	https://www.intervalsignals.net/sounds/ben-ortb_radio_benin_121205.mp3
Bermuda Broadcasting Company:	
Bhutan Broadcasting Service:	https://www.intervalsignals.net/sounds/btn-bbs_dzongkha_250208.mp3
(Bolivia) Radio Illimani:	https://www.intervalsignals.net/sounds/bol-radio_illimani_220804.mp3
Radio Bonaire:	
(Bosnia and Herzegovina) BH Radio 1:	https://www.intervalsignals.net/sounds/bih-rtvfbih_bhradio1_201108.mp3
Radio Botswana:	https://www.intervalsignals.net/sounds/bot-z-radio_botswana_241199.mp3
(Brazil) Rádio Nacional:	
(Brazil) Rádio MEC:	
(British Indian Ocean Territory) AFN Diego Garcia:	
Radio Brunei:	https://www.intervalsignals.net/sounds/bru-z-radio_brunei_c1964.mp3
Radio Bulgaria:	
(Burkina Faso) Radio Burkina:	
Radio Burundi:	https://www.intervalsignals.net/sounds/bdi-radio_burundi1_110809.mp3
National Radio of Cambodia:	https://www.intervalsignals.net/sounds/cbg-nrc_national_041211.mp3
(Cameroon) CRTV:	https://www.intervalsignals.net/sounds/cme-crtv_national_station_071105.mp3
(Cape Verde) Rádio Nacional de Cabo Verde:	
(Cayman Islands) Radio Cayman:	
(Central African Republic) Radio Centrafrique:	https://www.intervalsignals.net/sounds/caf-radio_centrafrique_c1995.mp3
(Chad) Radiodiffusion Nationale Tchadienne:	https://www.intervalsignals.net/sounds/tcd-rnt_201111.mp3
China National Radio and China Radio International: Chime version of March of the Volunteers (义勇军进行曲).	
/ (Indonesia) CRI Indonesian Radio (and Radio Peking, predecessor of China Radio International): 东方红 ("The East Is Red").	
(China) / (Taiwan) Voice of the Strait News Radio: Bell version of "Three Rules of Discipline and Eight Points for Attention" (三大纪律八项注意).	
Radio Christmas Island:	
(Cocos (Keeling) Islands) VK9X:	
(Colombia) La Voz de la Resistencia:	01. https://www.intervalsignals.net/sounds/clm-voz_de_la_resistencia_ow_0102.mp3; 02. https://www.intervalsignals.net/sounds/clm-voz_de_la_resistencia_eb_ow_0102.mp3; 03. https://www.intervalsignals.net/sounds/clm-voz_de_la_resistencia_wf_ow_0102.mp3
Radio Nacional de Colombia:	https://www.intervalsignals.net/sounds/clm-radio_nacional_221009.mp3
Radio Comoros:	https://www.intervalsignals.net/sounds/com-radio_comoro_091207.mp3
(Democratic Republic of the Congo) Radio Nationale:	https://www.intervalsignals.net/sounds/cod-rtnc_nationale_110917.mp3
(Republic of the Congo) Radio Congo:	https://www.intervalsignals.net/sounds/cog-radio_congo_270500.mp3
Cook Islands Radio:	
(Costa Rica) Adventist World Radio (AWR):	https://www.intervalsignals.net/sounds/ctr-z-awr_c1995.mp3
Radio Nacional de Costa Rica:	https://www.intervalsignals.net/sounds/ctr-radio_nacional_060214.mp3
(Croatia) Croatian Radio:	https://www.intervalsignals.net/sounds/hrv-z-croatian_radio_sw_c1999.mp3
Radio Habana Cuba: Refrain of "March of the 26th of July" (es:La Marcha del 26 de Julio) by Agustín Díaz Cartaya.	
(Curaçao) Radio Hoyer:	
(Northern Cyprus) Bayrak Radio and Television Corporation:	
(Czech Republic) Radio Prague International:	https://www.intervalsignals.net/sounds/cze-cro7_radio_prague_111110.mp3
(Denmark) DR P1: "Drømte mig en drøm i nat", played on metallophone.	
Radio Djibouti:	https://www.intervalsignals.net/sounds/dji-rd1_031207.mp3
(Dominica) DBS Radio:	https://www.intervalsignals.net/sounds/dma-dbs_151113.mp3
(Dominican Republic) Radio Santo Domingo:	https://www.intervalsignals.net/sounds/dom-certv_rsd_181012.mp3
Radio Nacional de El Salvador:	https://www.intervalsignals.net/sounds/slv-radio_nacional_280613.mp3
(Equatorial Guinea) Radio Nacional de Guinea Ecuatorial:	
(Eritrea) Voice of the Broad Masses:	https://www.intervalsignals.net/sounds/eri-vobme1_121203.mp3
(Estonia) Radio Tallinn:	https://www.intervalsignals.net/sounds/est-z-radio_tallinn_c1985.mp3
Eswatini Broadcasting and Information Service (Swazi Service):	https://www.intervalsignals.net/sounds/swz-ebis-1_071122.mp3
Eswatini Broadcasting and Information Service (English Service):	https://www.intervalsignals.net/sounds/swz-ebis2_201123.mp3
Radio Ethiopia:	
Falkland Islands Radio Service:	
(Faroe Islands) Kringvarp Føroya:	
Fiji Broadcasting Commission (FBC):	https://www.intervalsignals.net/sounds/fji-z-fbc_c1965.mp3
Radio France Internationale: Electronic-disco, culminating in the last 8 measures of "La Marseillaise".	
(French Guiana) Guyane La 1ère:	
(French Polynesia) Polynésie La 1ère:	
Radio Gabon:	https://www.intervalsignals.net/sounds/gab-radio_gabon_010424.mp3
(The Gambia) GRTS:	https://www.intervalsignals.net/sounds/gmb-grts_240311_040711.mp3
(Georgia (country)) Georgian Radio:	https://www.intervalsignals.net/sounds/geo-z-georgian_radio.mp3
(Germany) Deutsche Welle: "Es sucht der Bruder seine Brüder" from Fidelio (Act2 No.16 Finale. Heil sei dem Tag!) by Ludwig van Beethoven.	
(Ghana) Uniiq FM:	https://www.intervalsignals.net/sounds/gha-gbc_uniiqfm_290212.mp3
Radio Gibraltar:	
Voice of Greece: "The Little Shepherd" (el:Ο Τσομπανάκος), played on floghera.	
(Greenland) Kalaallit Nunaata Radioa:	
(Grenada) K105:	https://www.intervalsignals.net/sounds/grd-gbn_k105_271114.mp3
Guadeloupe La 1ère:	
(Guam) KPRG:	
W Radio (La Voz de Guatemala):	https://www.intervalsignals.net/sounds/gtm-wradio_140214.mp3
(Bailiwick of Guernsey) BBC Radio Guernsey:	
Radio Guinea:	https://www.intervalsignals.net/sounds/gui-radio_guinea_260518.mp3
(Guinea-Bissau) Radiodifusão Nacional da Guiné-Bissau:	
Voice of Guyana:	https://www.intervalsignals.net/sounds/guy-ncn_vo_guyana_250417.mp3
(Haiti) 4VEH:	https://www.intervalsignals.net/sounds/hti-radio_4veh_010605.mp3
Radio Nacional de Honduras:	https://www.intervalsignals.net/sounds/hnd-radio_nacional_140214.mp3
Radio Hong Kong:	
(Iceland) Rikisutvarpid:	https://www.intervalsignals.net/sounds/isl-z-rikisutvarpid_rvd_c1965.mp3
All India Radio: A tune composed by Walter Kaufmann or Thakur Balwant Singh, used since 1936.	
(India) AIR Goa:	
Indonesia: RRI Programa 3: Ending bars of "Solace on Coconut Island" (Rayuan Pulau Kelapa), composed by Ismail Marzuki.	RRI Regional: "Love Ambon" by George de Fretes RRI Voice of Indonesia: "Feeling of Love" (Rasa Sayang).
IRIB World Service (VIRI: Voice of the Islamic Republic of Iran):	https://www.intervalsignals.net/sounds/irn-viriws_cheshmazar_is_181123.mp3
(Iraq) Iraqi Media Network:	01. https://www.intervalsignals.net/sounds/irq-imn_roir_190924.mp3; 02. https://www.intervalsignals.net/sounds/irq-imn_radio_iraqia_290416.mp3; 03. https://www.intervalsignals.net/sounds/irq-imn_radio_forqan_130616.mp3; 04. https://www.intervalsignals.net/sounds/irq-imn_babagurgur_090307.mp3; 05. https://www.intervalsignals.net/sounds/irq-radio_babil_260904.mp3; 06. https://www.intervalsignals.net/sounds/irq-radio_basra_100206.mp3; 07. https://www.intervalsignals.net/sounds/irq-imn_radio_diyala_080804.mp3; 08. https://www.intervalsignals.net/sounds/irq-imn_radio_mosul_021116.mp3
(Republic of Ireland) RTÉ Radio 1: 2nd segment of "O'Donnell Forever" (O'Donnell Abú).	
(Isle of Man) Manx Radio:	
(Ivory Coast) Radio Cote d'Ivoire:	https://www.intervalsignals.net/sounds/cti-rci_110404.mp3
(Jamaica) RJR 94FM:	https://www.intervalsignals.net/sounds/jmc-rjr_94_fm_301100.mp3
NHK Radio Japan: "KazoeUta (Hitotsu to ya)" (数え歌, counting-out game).	
(Japan) Radio Nikkei: Kan Ishii	
BBC Radio Jersey:	
Radio Jordan:	https://www.intervalsignals.net/sounds/jor-z-rj_english_c1999.mp3
(Kazakhstan) Kazakh Radio:	https://www.intervalsignals.net/sounds/kaz-z-kazakh_radio.mp3
(Kenya) KBC:	https://www.intervalsignals.net/sounds/ken-z-kbc_national_300504.mp3
Radio Kiribati:	https://www.intervalsignals.net/sounds/kir-z-radio_kiribati_121105.mp3
(North Korea) Voice of Korea: Melody of "Song of General Kim Il-sung" (김일성장군의 노래).	Pyongyang FM: Melody of "Song of General Kim Jong-il" (김정일장군의 노래).
(South Korea) KBS World Radio: "Dawn" (여명); Korean kids song "Moon, moon, bright moon" (달아 달아 밝은달아)	
(Kosovo) Radio Kosova:	https://www.intervalsignals.net/sounds/ksv-z-rtk_kosova1_170600.mp3
Radio Kuwait:	https://www.intervalsignals.net/sounds/kwt-z-radio_kuwait_cm.mp3
(Kyrgyzstan) Kyrgyz Radio:	https://www.intervalsignals.net/sounds/kgz-z-kirghiz_radio_c1982.mp3
(Laos) Lao National Radio:	https://www.intervalsignals.net/sounds/lao-z-lnr_external_280308.mp3
Radio Lebanon:	https://www.intervalsignals.net/sounds/lbn-z-radio_lebanon.mp3
Radio Lesotho:	https://www.intervalsignals.net/sounds/lso-rl_main_290912.mp3
(Liberia) ELBC:	https://www.intervalsignals.net/sounds/lbr-lbs_elbc_111013.mp3
Libya National Radio:	01. https://www.intervalsignals.net/sounds/lby-lnr_benghazi_191017.mp3; 02. https://www.intervalsignals.net/sounds/lby-lnr_tripoli_211017.mp3
Radio Liechtenstein:	https://www.intervalsignals.net/sounds/lie-z-radio_liechtenstein_050924.mp3
(Luxembourg) RTL Radio: last segment of "lb:De Feierwon" by Michel Lentz, played on chimes.	
Radio Macau:	
(North Macedonia) Macedonian Radio:	https://www.intervalsignals.net/sounds/mkd-mr1_150425.mp3
Radio Madagascar (mg:Radio Madagasikara):	
(Malawi) MBC Radio:	https://www.intervalsignals.net/sounds/mwi-z-mbc_domestic_c1976.mp3
Voice of Maldives:	https://www.intervalsignals.net/sounds/mld-psm_vom_dhivehi_raajjeyge_adu_281016.mp3
(Mali) ORTM:	https://www.intervalsignals.net/sounds/mli-ortm_national_network_201101.mp3
(Marshall Islands) V7AB:	https://www.intervalsignals.net/sounds/mhl-radio_marshalls_031015.mp3
La 1ère Martinique:	
Radio Mauritania:	
Mayotte La 1ère:	
Mauritius Broadcasting Corporation:	https://www.intervalsignals.net/sounds/mau-z-mbc_c1978.mp3
(Mexico) XEW:	
(Federated States of Micronesia) V6AH:	https://www.intervalsignals.net/sounds/fsm-v6ah_voice_of_pohnpei_141105.mp3
(Moldova) Moldavian Radio:	https://www.intervalsignals.net/sounds/mda-radio_moldova_171214.mp3
Voice of Mongolia: "Motherland" (Эх орон) by Luvsanjambyn Mördorj.	
(Montenegro) Radio Crne Gore:	https://www.intervalsignals.net/sounds/mne-radio_montenegro_300507.mp3
Radio Montserrat:	
(Morocco) SNRT:	https://www.intervalsignals.net/sounds/mrc-snrt_national_250511.mp3
(Mozambique) Rádio Moçambique:	
Myanmar Radio:	https://www.intervalsignals.net/sounds/brm-mr_national_burmese_200125.mp3
(Namibia) NBC (National Radio):	https://www.intervalsignals.net/sounds/nmb-nbc_national_091209.mp3
(Nauru) Radio Naoero:	https://www.intervalsignals.net/sounds/nru-radio_naoero_140826.mp3
Radio Nepal: A tune composed by Ustad Govinda Lal Nepali.	
(New Caledonia) NC La 1ère:	
Radio New Zealand International: The call of a New Zealand bellbird	
Radio Nicaragua:	https://www.intervalsignals.net/sounds/ncg-radio_nicaragua_010903.mp3
(Niger) ORTN:	
Radio Nigeria:	https://www.intervalsignals.net/sounds/nig-radio_nigeria_abuja_180805.mp3
Radio Niue:	
(Norfolk Island) Radio Norfolk:	
(Northern Mariana Islands) KCNM:	
Radio Sultanate of Oman:	https://www.intervalsignals.net/sounds/oma-z-rso_arabic_c1996.mp3
(South Ossetia) South Ossetian Radio:	
Radio Pakistan: A tune composed by Khwaja Khursheed Anwar.	
(Palau) T8WH:	https://www.intervalsignals.net/sounds/plw-hope_radio_t8wh_070524.mp3
Voice of Palestine:	https://www.intervalsignals.net/sounds/wbg-vo_palestine_english_050907.mp3
(Panama) SERT (Nacional FM):	https://www.intervalsignals.net/sounds/pnr-sert_nacionalfm_060411.mp3
(Papua New Guinea) NBC (Karai National Radio):	https://www.intervalsignals.net/sounds/png-nbc_karai_260905.mp3
Radio Nacional del Paraguay:	https://www.intervalsignals.net/sounds/prg-z-rn_c1976.mp3
Radio Nacional del Peru:	https://www.intervalsignals.net/sounds/pru-z-irtp_nacional_220902.mp3
(Pitcairn Islands) Pitcairn Island Radio:	
(Philippines) : Far East Broadcasting Company: 2nd segment of "We Have Heard the Joyful Sound (Jesus Saves)".	Radio Veritas Asia: "O via, vita, veritas".
(Portugal) RTP Antena 1, Antena 1 Açores, Antena 1 Madeira, RTP África, and RTP Mundo:	
(Puerto Rico) WIPR Radio:	
: Qatar Radio	
Réunion La 1ère:	
Radio Romania International: The first nine notes of “Pui de lei", lyrics by Ioan S. Nenițescu and song by Ionel G. Brătianu	
(Russia) Radio Mayak: Vibraphone version of Moscow Nights.	Radio Sakha: Excerpt from a Yakut folk song.
: Radio Rwanda	
(Saba (island)) : Radio Saba	
(Saint Barthélemy) : Radio St. Barth	
(Sint Eustatius) : PJC-4	
(Saint Helena) : Radio St. Helena	
(Sahrawi Arab Democratic Republic) : Radio Nacional de la RASD: Five final notes of a 1960s Polisarian revolutionary anti-colonial and anti-imperialist song	
(Saint Kitts and Nevis) : ZIZ Radio	https://www.intervalsignals.net/sounds/scn-ziz_radio_220912.mp3
(Saint Lucia) : Radio St. Lucia	https://www.intervalsignals.net/sounds/lca-z-rsl_260703.mp3
(Sint Maarten) : PJB3	
(Collectivity of Saint Martin) : Saint-Martin La 1ère	
(Saint Pierre and Miquelon) : SPM La 1ère	
(Saint Vincent and the Grenadines) : NBC Radio	https://www.intervalsignals.net/sounds/vct-nbc_051012.mp3
(American Samoa) : KVZK	
(Samoa) : National Radio 2AP	https://www.intervalsignals.net/sounds/smo-radio2ap_011120.mp3
: Radio San Marino	https://www.intervalsignals.net/sounds/smr-rsm_270307.mp3
(São Tomé and Príncipe) Rádio Nacional de São Tomé e Príncipe:	
(Saudi Arabia) : Radio Saudi International	
Radio Senegal Chaine Nationale:	https://www.intervalsignals.net/sounds/sen-z-radio_senegal_chaine_nationale_fdxa_c1976.mp3
(Seychelles) FEBA Radio:	https://www.intervalsignals.net/sounds/sey-z-feba_c1968.mp3
Sierra Leone Broadcasting Corporation:	https://www.intervalsignals.net/sounds/srl-z-slbs_280800.mp3
Radio Slovenia: Electronically generated cuckoo chirping.	
(Solomon Islands) : Solomons Radio	https://www.intervalsignals.net/sounds/slm-z-sibs_fdxa_c1976.mp3
(Somalia) : Radio Mogadishu	https://www.intervalsignals.net/sounds/som-radio_mogadishu_votrs_040912.mp3
(Somaliland) : Radio Hargeysa	
(South Africa) : Channel Africa	https://www.intervalsignals.net/sounds/afs-channel_africa_130501.mp3
: BFBS South Georgia and the South Sandwich Islands	
: South Sudan Radio	https://www.intervalsignals.net/sounds/ssd-south_sudan_radio_020114.mp3
(Sri Lanka) : SLBC National Service (Sinhala Service)	https://www.intervalsignals.net/sounds/cln-slbc_national_sinhala_160901.mp3
(Sri Lanka) : SLBC National Service (Tamil Service)	https://www.intervalsignals.net/sounds/cln-slbc_national_tamil_160901.mp3
: Sudan Radio	https://www.intervalsignals.net/sounds/sdn-omdurman_domestic_011206.mp3
: Radio Suriname International	https://www.intervalsignals.net/sounds/sur-z-radio_suriname_international_sdp_c1989.mp3
: NRK Svalbard	
(Syria) : Radio Damascus	
Voice of Free China (current Radio Taiwan International):	
(Tajikistan) Tajik Radio:	https://www.intervalsignals.net/sounds/tjk-z-tajik_radio_c1978.mp3
(Tanzania) TBC FM:	https://www.intervalsignals.net/sounds/tza-tbcfm_280614.mp3
(Timor-Leste) Radio Timor Leste:	
(Togo) Radio Lomé:	https://www.intervalsignals.net/sounds/tgo-radio_lome_270405.mp3
Radio Tokelau:	
Radio Tonga:	https://www.intervalsignals.net/sounds/ton-tbc_radio_tonga_a3z_060312.mp3
(Transnistria) Radio PMR:	
(Trinidad and Tobago) Caribbean New Media Group:	01. https://www.intervalsignals.net/sounds/trd-cnmg_nextfm_010515.mp3; 02. https://www.intervalsignals.net/sounds/trd-cnmg_sweetfm_010515.mp3; 03. https://www.intervalsignals.net/sounds/trd-cnmg_talkcity_010515.mp3
(Tristan da Cunha) ZFB-2:	
(Tunisia) Radio Tunis Chaîne Internationale:	https://www.intervalsignals.net/sounds/tun-z-rt_international_281000.mp3
(Turkmenistan) Turkmen Radio:	https://www.intervalsignals.net/sounds/tkm-z-tr1_c1978.mp3
(Turks and Caicos Islands) Radio Turks and Caicos:	
Radio Tuvalu:	https://www.intervalsignals.net/sounds/tuv-radio_tuvalu_271107.mp3
(United Arab Emirates) : Radio Abu Dhabi	https://www.intervalsignals.net/sounds/uae-z-uae_radio_abu_dhabi_english.mp3
(United Arab Emirates) : Radio Dubai	https://www.intervalsignals.net/sounds/uae-z-uae_radio_dubai_english.mp3
: Radio Uganda	
Radio Ukraine International: "The Wide Dniepr Roars and Moans" (Реве та стогне Дніпр широкий).	
(United Kingdom) BBC World Service: English programme: "Bow Bells", 10 change-ringing bells.; Non-English programme, non-Europe: three notes tuned B–B–C.; Non-English programme, to Europe: four notes tuned B–B–B–E.	
(United States) : NBC: 3 chime-like notes.	
(United States) Trans World Radio (TWR)
(United States) // (Sri Lanka) Trans World Radio: Hymne Monégasque (Monaco anthem)	
(United States) / (Cyprus) TWR Europe: Amazing Grace	
(United States) / TWR Albania: last segment of "What a Friend We Have in Jesus"	
(United States) / TWR Guam: first part of "We've a story to tell to the nations"	
(United States) / (Eswatini) TWR Africa: last part of "We've a story to tell to the nations"	
(United States) / TWR Bonaire: last part of Stand Up, Stand Up for Jesus by George James Webb, in various renditions	
(United States) Voice of America: Brass band version of "Yankee Doodle".	
(United States) Middle East Broadcasting Networks (MBN), Middle Eastern and North African service of "Voice of America" (VOA): Middle Eastern and North African traditional musical version of "Yankee Doodle".	
(United States) Radio Free Asia (RFA), Far Eastern service of "Voice of America" (VOA): Far Eastern traditional musical version of "Yankee Doodle".	
(United States) Radio Free Europe / Radio Liberty (RFE / RL), Central and Eastern European service of "Voice of America" (VOA): Central and Eastern European traditional musical version of "Yankee Doodle".	
(United States) Radio y Televisión Martí (RTM), Latin American service of "Voice of America" (VOA): Latin American traditional musical version of "Yankee Doodle".	
(United States) WEWN, later EWTN Global Radio: "Salve Regina" (in simple tone) by Henri Dumont	
(Uruguay) SODRE:	01. https://www.intervalsignals.net/sounds/urg-z-sodre_uruguay_091106.mp3; 02. https://www.intervalsignals.net/sounds/urg-z-sodre_babelfm_091106.mp3; 03. https://www.intervalsignals.net/sounds/urg-z-sodre_clasica_091106.mp3; 04. https://www.intervalsignals.net/sounds/urg-z-sodre_emisora_del_sur_091106.mp3
(Uzbekistan) Uzbek Radio:	https://www.intervalsignals.net/sounds/uzb-z-uzbek_radio1_c1996.mp3
Radio Vanuatu:	https://www.intervalsignals.net/sounds/vut-vbtc_radio_vanuatu_060726.mp3
(Vatican City) Vatican Radio: "Christus Vincit" by fr:Aloys Kunc.	
Radio Nacional de Venezuela's Canal Internacional: Beginning of "Alma Llanera" by Pedro Elías Gutiérrez and Rafael Bolívar Coronado.	
(Vietnam) Đài tiếng nói Việt Nam (VOV): latter half of "vi:Diệt phát xít"	
(British Virgin Islands) ZBVI 780 AM:	
(United States Virgin Islands) WTJX Public Radio:	
(Wallis and Futuna) Wallis et Futuna La 1ère:	
Radio Yemen:	https://www.intervalsignals.net/sounds/yem-royr1_sana_english_c1999.mp3 https://www.intervalsignals.net/sounds/yem-royr2_aden_english_190804.mp3
Radio Zambia:	https://www.intervalsignals.net/sounds/zmb-z-radio_zambia_xs_c1978.mp3
Radio Zimbabwe:	https://www.intervalsignals.net/sounds/zwe-zbc_radio_zimbabwe_300102.mp3

=== Formerly used ===
Interval signals
Radio station	Playable sound
(Albania) Radio Tirana Këputa një gjethe dafine (transmission intro); the trumpet version of With Pickaxe and Rifle.	
Radio Australia Chorus segment of Waltzing Matilda; Kookaburra call; News signature tune: Majestic Fanfare.	
(Austria) Radio Österreich International An der schönen blauen Donau ("Blue Danube Waltz") by Johann Strauss.	
(Austria) Ö1 Three notes signifying O–R–F by Werner Pirchner, played on viola.	
(Austria) ORF	1st Program: Schubert, Rosamunde, Ballet Music 2 3rd Program: Haydn, Surprise Symphony
(Belgium) RTBF International:	Où peut-on être mieux qu’au sein de sa famille ? Benoit, Beiaardlied
(Brazil) Rádio Nacional	
Radio Canada International	First four notes of O Canada, played on piano (played in G major) , an electronic square wave (played in Bb major) , or autoharp (played in D major).
Radio Nacional de Chile	https://www.intervalsignals.net/sounds/chl-z-radio_nacional_1983.mp3
(People's Republic of the Congo) La Voix de la Revolution	https://www.intervalsignals.net/sounds/cog-z-la_voix_de_la_revolution_congolaise.mp3
Cyprus Broadcasting Corporation	Closing segment of Avkoritissa (Αυκορίτισσα), a traditional Cypriot song of Avgorou
(Czechoslovakia) Radio Prague	Smetana, Má vlast, 1. Vyšehrad Last segment of Kupředu levá ("Forward, Left") by cs:Jan Seidl Adagio – Allegro molto from Symphony No. 9 by Dvořák.
Radio Denmark: Nielsen, Moderen, Scene7 No.22 Som en rejselysten flåde	
(Ecuador) HCJB: using a motif from Great Is Thy Faithfulness	HCJB Japanese program: "Sakura Sakura" (さくらさくら, cherry blossoms)
(Egypt) Radio Cairo:	https://www.intervalsignals.net/sounds/egy-z-radio_cairo_c1973.mp3
(Finland) Yle Radio 1: Pim-pam-pulla, a tune from the 1700s proposed by A. O. Väisänen for 5-string kantele.	
Radio France Internationale: a popular song, Nous n'irons plus au bois.	
(Allied-occupied Germany) Nordwestdeutscher Rundfunk: The 4th symphony by Brahms.	
(Nazi Germany) Reichssender Berlin: Ending bars of Volk ans Gewehr, played on celesta.	
(East Germany) Berliner Rundfunk: Motif from the opera Regina, Act3 Finale by Albert Lortzing, played by horns.	Radio Berlin International: Beginning of Auferstanden aus Ruinen ("Risen from Ruins"), played on chimes. Radio DDR: Refrain of de:Wann wir schreiten Seit’ an Seit’ Radio NTS: Tchaikovsky, Symphony #5, Mvt.4 DFS 904: "Ode to Joy"
Germany	Deutschlandfunk: Ending bars of "Ich hab' mich ergeben" by August Daniel von Binzer. RIAS Berlin: Franz Wallner-Basté Deutschlandsender: Mozart, The Magic Flute (Ein Mädchen oder Weibchen) / Schubart, Üb’ immer Treu und Redlichkeit Funk-Stunde Berlin:
ORAG Königsberg	
Friedrich Dewischeit, de:Masurenlied (Wild flutet der See)	Wo des Haffes Wellen trecken an den Strand NORAG Hamburg: Wagner, Der fliegende Holländer, Act 3, Steuermann, lass die Wacht (Sailors' Chorus) NDR Hamburg Brahms, Symphony #2, Mvt.1 (Dominant major ninth chord) WERAG Köln: WDR Köln: Beethoven, Bundeslied (In allen guten Stunden) Deutsche Stunde in Bayern München: Wagner, Parsifal, Parsifal bell BR München: Wiesberg, de:Solang der alte Peter Schlesische Funkstunde Breslau: Hohenfriedberger Marsch Sender Freies Berlin: Es-F-B Radio Saarbrücken: Kein schöner Land in dieser Zeit SR Saarbrücken: de:Steigerlied (2nd line: Und er hat sein helles Licht bei der Nacht) SWF Baden-Baden: Mozart, The Magic Flute (Act 2: No.21, Finale: Bald prangt, den Morgen zu verkünden) SDR Stuttgart: Silcher, Jetzt gang i ans Brünnele HR Frankfurt: Hermann Heiss Radio Bremen: Bach, Mass in B minor, Et in terra pax
(Hungary) Budapest I: Excerpts from the suite 1848 by T.K. Polgar played on three trumpets and two cornets.	Budapest II and Budapest III
(Ba'athist Iraq) Radio Baghdad:	https://www.intervalsignals.net/sounds/irq-z-radio_baghdad_c1978.mp3
(Israel) Kol Yisrael: latter half of Hatikvah played on trumpets and timpani.	
(Italy) Rai Italia Radio: Mechanically generated canary chirping.	
(Latvia) Radio Riga:	
(History of Libya under Muammar Gaddafi) LJBC:	
(Lithuania) Radio Vilnius: Lietuvininkai we are born	latter half of Anthem of the Lithuanian Soviet Socialist Republic
Voice of Malaysia: Dondang Sayang	
(Malta) Voice of the Mediterranean:	https://www.intervalsignals.net/sounds/mlt-z-vom.mp3
(Monaco) Radio Monte Carlo (French Service)	https://www.intervalsignals.net/sounds/mco-rmc_french_160601.mp3
(Monaco) Radio Monte Carlo (Italian Service)	https://www.intervalsignals.net/sounds/mco-rmc_italian_160601.mp3
(Netherlands) NPO First eight notes of Wilhelmus, played on: Flute family: Hilversum 1 (Radio 2); Oboe family: Hilversum 2 (Radio 1), Hilversum 5; Synthesizer then Carillon: Hilversum 3; Harpsichord: Hilversum 4	Radio Netherlands: Carillon version of the Eighty Years' War song Merck toch hoe sterck.
NRK P1: Motif from Sigurd Jorsalfar by Edvard Grieg.; Radio Norway International (Utenlandssendingen, former international service of NRK): no:Pausesignalet og kjenningssignalet; Pausesignalet: a herding call stylized by Eivind Groven	Kjenningssignalet: beginning bars of Symphony No.1 "Innover viddene" by Eivind Groven
(Poland) Radio Katowice: Sound of a hammer striking an anvil. Radio Olsztyn: Excerpt from pl:O Warmio moja miła by Feliks Nowowiejski, played on barrel organ.	Polish Radio External Service: Excerpt from Prząśniczka by Stanisław Moniuszko Radio Polonia: Etude No. 12 ("Revolutionary Etude") by Chopin Military Polonaise by Chopin
(Romania) Radio Bucharest 1 and Radio Bucharest External Service (pre 1989): Fragment from Cantata anilor luminǎ by Anatol Vieru	
Voice of Russia: "Great Gate of Kiev" portion of Pictures at an Exhibition by Mussorgsky.	
Radio Serbia: Bože pravde, in various renditions.	
Radio Singapore:	https://www.intervalsignals.net/sounds/sng-z-radio_singapore_c1983.mp3
Radio Slovakia International: sk:Kto za pravdu horí	
(Union of South Africa) Radio RSA (former international service of Apartheid-era South African Broadcasting Corporation): Bokmakierie chirping and first bars of Ver in die Wereld, Kittie, played on guitar.	
(Spain) Radio Exterior de España: "Generala" (1761,1769) by es:Manuel de Espinosa de los Monteros	
Radio Sweden: Ut i vida världen ("Out in the Wide World"), composed by Ralph Lundsten	The opening notes of Carl Michael Bellman's Storm och böljor tystna r'en.
(Switzerland) Radio Beromünster: D' Zit isch do, played on music box.	Swiss Radio International: de:Lueget, vo Bärgen und Tal. Red Cross Broadcasting Service: Purcell, The Indian Queen, Trumpet Tune
Radio Thailand - World Service:	https://www.intervalsignals.net/sounds/tha-z-radio_thailand_1974.mp3
Voice of Turkey: Turkish makam, played on piano.	
Radio Moscow (former international service of the Soviet Union)	Подмосковные вечера ("Moscow Nights") performed by "Georgy Garanian and Melodia" Песня о Родине ("Wide Is My Motherland")
(United Kingdom) BBC World Service: Trumpet version of Oranges and Lemons; first four notes of Symphony No. 5 by Beethoven, played on timpani; Lillibullero (signature tune).	
(United States) World Christian Broadcasting (Alaska KNLS, Madagascar Madagascar World Voice (MWV)) Chariots of Fire by Vangelis	An unnamed tune by Jeff Brock
(United States) WYFR: First bars of To God Be the Glory by William Howard Doane	
(Socialist Federal Republic of Yugoslavia) Radio Yugoslavia (1980–1989)	Druže Tito, ljubićice bjela anonymous Partisan song, in various orchestral renditions.The Internationale
(Socialist Federal Republic of Yugoslavia) Radio Yugoslavia, later International Radio of Serbia and Montenegro: 2nd verse of Svečana Pesma (sr:Свечана песма) by sh:Nikola Hercigonja	
La Voix du Zaire:	https://www.intervalsignals.net/sounds/cod-z-lv_du_zaire_mb_1980.mp3
(United States) Classical radio station WQXR-FM in New York City, during its ownership by The New York Times Company, played different variations of a classical infused gong with the ID read at the same time as "The Classical Station of the New York Times, WQXR, New York (And WQXR.com 2000–2009)	

=== Numbers station interval signals ===
Numbers stations are often named after their interval signals, such as The Lincolnshire Poacher or Magnetic Fields after "Magnetic Fields Part 1" by Jean-Michel Jarre.
