= List of international broadcasters =

Broadcasting in around the world

This list of international broadcasters lists those broadcasting services which broadcast programs for an external audience.

== Radio ==
=== Africa ===
Country of origin	Name of Radio Service	Service	Website
Algeria	Radio Algérie Internationale	FM/Online/Satellite	
Equatorial Guinea	Radio Africa Network	SW/Online	
Ethiopia	africa		
Kenya	Kenya Broadcasting Corporation		
Libya	LGBC Voice of Africa		
Morocco	Chaîne Inter	FM/AM/Internet/Satellite	
Nigeria	Voice of Nigeria	SW/Online	
South Africa	Channel Africa	Online/Satellite	
Tunisia	Radio Tunis Chaîne Internationale	AM/FM/DAB+/Online/Satellite	

=== Asia ===
Country of origin	Name of Radio Service	Service	Website
Bangladesh	Bangladesh Betar		
Burma	Democratic Voice of Burma		
People's Republic of China	China Radio International	SW/Internet	
India	PB-Akashvani (All India Radio)		
Indonesia	Voice of Indonesia	SW/DAB+/Online/Satellite	
Japan	NHK Radio Japan	SW/Online	
Mongolia	Voice of Mongolia		
Myanmar	Myanmar Radio International	FM/DAB+	
North Korea	Voice of Korea		
Pakistan	Radio Pakistan		
Philippines	Radyo Pilipinas World Service	SW/Online	
South Korea	KBS World Radio	SW/Online/Satellite	
Sri Lanka	Sri Lanka Broadcasting Corporation		
Thailand	Radio Thailand World Service	SW/Satellite	
Taiwan	Radio Taiwan International	SW/Online	
Vietnam	Voice of Vietnam 5 (VOV World)	FM/Online/Satellite	

=== Europe ===
Country of origin	Name of Radio Service	Service	Website
Albania	Radio Tirana International	Online	
Azerbaijan	Azerbaijan International Radio		
Belarus	Radio Belarus	FM/Online	
Bulgaria	Radio Bulgaria	Online	
Croatia	Voice of Croatia	Online	
Cyprus	Cyprus Broadcasting Corporation		
Czech Republic	Radio Prague	Online	
Estonia	Raadio Tallinn	FM/Online	
Finland	YLE Mondo	FM	
France	Radio France Internationale	FM/AM/DAB+/Online/Satellite	
Germany	Deutsche Welle	SW/Online/Satellite	
Greece (Athens)	Voice of Greece	SW/Online/Satellite	
Greece (Thessaloniki)	Radio Station of Macedonia		
Ireland	Irish Radio Relay Service		
Italy	NEXUS International Broadcasting Association		
Italy	European Gospel Radio		
Italy	International Public Access Radio (IPAR)		
Moldova	Radio Moldova		
North Macedonia	Radio Macedonia	FM/SW/Satellite	
Poland	Radio Poland	SW/DAB+/Online/Satellite	
Poland	European Radio for Belarus		
Portugal	RTP África	FM/Online/Satellite	
Portugal	RTP Mundo	SW/FM/Online/Satellite	
Romania	Radio Romania International	SW/Online/Satellite	
Russia	Radio Sputnik	SW/FM/Online	
Slovakia	Radio Slovakia International	FM (Relay From rádio Litera)/DAB+/Online/Satellite	
Slovenia	Radio Slovenia International	FM/Online/Satellite	
Spain	Radio Exterior	SW/DAB+/Online/Satellite	
Switzerland	Swissinfo		
Transnistria	Radio PMR		
Turkey	Voice of Turkey	SW/Online/Satellite	
Ukraine	Radio Ukraine International	Online	
United Kingdom	BBC World Service	SW/AM/DAB+/Online/Satellite	
Vatican City	Vatican Radio	SW/FM/DAB+/Online/Satellite	
Independent	Radio Free Europe/Radio Liberty	SW/AM/Online	

=== Middle East ===
Country of origin	Name of Radio Service	Service	Website
Iran	IRIB World Service	SW/Online/Satellite	
Israel	Kan Reka	SW/Online	
Saudi Arabia	Saudia Radio	SW/Online	

=== North & South America ===
Country of origin	Name of Radio Service	Service	Website
Argentina	Radiodifusión Argentina al Exterior	SW/Online/Satellite	
Brazil	Rádio Nacional		
Canada	Radio Canada International		
Cuba	Radio Habana Cuba	SW/Online/Satellite	
Cuba	Radio Reloj		
Mexico	Radio México Internacional	Online	
United States of America	Voice of America 1	SW/Online/Satellite	

=== Oceania ===
Country of origin	Name of Radio Service	Service	Website
Australia	Radio Australia	SW/FM/DAB+/Online/Satellite	ABC Asia (Asia–Pacific); ABC Pacific (Pacific)
New Zealand	RNZ Pacific	SW/Online	RNZ Pacific

== Television ==
=== Europe ===
Country of origin	Name of Television Service	Free-to-air/Encrypted	Website
Albania	RTSH Satelit	Free-to-air Freeview (Satellite)	
Austria	ORF 2 Europe	Free-to-air Freeview (Terrestrial and Satellite)	
Bosnia and Herzegovina	Radio and Television of Bosnia and Herzegovina	Free-to-air Freeview (Terrestrial and Satellite)	
Bulgaria	BNT 4	Free-to-air Freeview	
Croatia	HRT International	Free-to-air Freeview (Satellite)	
Croatia	RTL Croatia World	Encrypted	
Cyprus	RIK Sat	Free-to-air Freeview (Satellite)	
Czech Republic	Nova International	Encrypted	
Finland	TV Finland	Encrypted (Free-to-air Freeview in Finnish-speaking areas of Sweden)	
France	France 24	Free-to-air Freeview (Terrestrial and Satellite)	
France	M6 International	Encrypted (Satellite)	
A France-based alliance of broadcasters of 5 Francophone countries such as Canada, Belgium, Switzerland, Monaco and Luxembourg ^{1}	TV5Monde	Free-to-air Freeview (Terrestrial and Satellite)	
A Germany-based alliance of broadcasters of 3 countries such as Austria, Switzerland and Liechtenstein ^{2}	3sat	Free-to-air Freeview (Terrestrial and Satellite)	
Germany	DW TV	Free-to-air Freeview (Terrestrial and Satellite)	
Greece (and Cyprus)	ERT Cosmos	Free-to-air Freeview (Terrestrial and Satellite)	
Greece	Alpha Sat	Free-to-air Freeview (Satellite)	
Greece	ANT1 Satellite	Free-to-air Freeview (Satellite)	
Greece	MEGA Cosmos	Encrypted	
Greece	Skai International	Free-to-air Freeview (Satellite)	
Greece	Star International	Free-to-air Freeview (Satellite)	
Hungary	Duna World	Free-to-air Freeview	
Italy	Rai Italia	Free-to-air Freeview (Terrestrial and Satellite)	
Italy	Rai World Premium	Encrypted	
Italy	Mediaset Italia	Free-to-air Freeview (Satellite)	
Kosovo	Radio Television of Kosovo	Free-to-air Freeview	
Lithuania	LRT Lituanica	Free-to-air Freeview	
Monaco	TVMonaco	Free-to-air	
Montenegro	TVCG MNE	Free-to-air Freeview (Satellite)	
Netherlands	BVN	Free-to-air Freeview (Terrestrial and Satellite)	
North Macedonia	MRT Sat	Free-to-air Freeview (Satellite)	
Norway	NRK	Free-to-air Freeview (Terrestrial and Satellite)	
Poland	TVP Polonia	Free-to-air Freeview (Terrestrial and Satellite)	
Poland	TVP World	Free-to-air Freeview (Terrestrial and Satellite)	
Poland	Belsat TV	Free-to-air Freeview	
Poland	Polsat 1	Free-to-air Freeview (Satellite)	
Poland	iTVN	Free-to-air Freeview (Satellite)	
Poland	iTVN Extra	Encrypted	
Portugal	RTP Mundo	Free-to-air Freeview (Terrestrial and Satellite)	RTP Mundo; RTP Mundo Live Streaming
Portugal	RTP África	Free-to-air Freeview (Terrestrial and Satellite)	RTP África; RTP África Live Streaming
Portugal	SIC Internacional	Free-to-air Freeview (Terrestrial and Satellite)	
Portugal	SIC Internacional África	Free-to-air Freeview (Satellite)	
Portugal	TVI Internacional	Free-to-air Freeview (Terrestrial and Satellite)	
Portugal	TVI África	Free-to-air Freeview (Streaming)	
Romania	TVRi	Free-to-air Freeview	
Romania	Pro TV Internațional	Encrypted	
Romania	Antena Internațional	Encrypted	
Russia	RTR-Planeta	Free-to-air Freeview	
Russia	Channel One Worldwide	Free-to-air Freeview (Satellite)	
Russia	RTVI	Free-to-air Freeview	
Russia	RT	Free-to-air Freeview	
Russia	Russia 24	Free-to-air Freeview	
Serbia	RTS Svet	Free-to-air Freeview	
Serbia	Pink World	Encrypted	
Serbia	Prva World	Encrypted	
Slovakia	Markíza International	Encrypted	
Spain	TVE Internacional	Free-to-air Freeview (Terrestrial and Satellite)	
Spain	Star	Encrypted	
Spain	24 Horas Internacional	Free-to-air Freeview (Satellite)	
Spain	Clan Internacional	Free-to-air Freeview (Satellite)	
Spain	Antena 3 Internacional	Free-to-air Freeview (Satellite)	
Spain	Atreseries Internacional	Encrypted	
Spain (Andalusia)	Canal Sur Andalucía	Free-to-air Freeview (Satellite)	
Spain (Aragon)	Aragón Internacional	Free-to-air Freeview (Satellite)	
Spain (Balearic Islands)	IB3 Global	Free-to-air Freeview (Satellite)	
Spain (Basque Country)	ETB Basque	Free-to-air Freeview (Satellite)	
Spain (Canary Islands)	Televisión Canaria Internacional	Free-to-air Freeview (Satellite)	
Spain (Catalonia)	TV3CAT	Free-to-air Freeview (Satellite)	
Spain (Galicia)	TVG América	Free-to-air Freeview (Satellite)	
Spain (Galicia)	TVG Europa	Free-to-air Freeview (Satellite)	
Spain (Madrid)	Telemadrid INT	Free-to-air Freeview (Satellite)	
Spain (Valencian Community)	À Punt INT	Free-to-air Freeview (Satellite)	
Turkey	TRT Türk	Free-to-air Freeview	TRT Turk
Turkey	TRT World	Free-to-air Freeview	TRT World
Turkey	ATV Avrupa	Free-to-air Freeview	ATV Avrupa
Turkey	A News	Free-to-air Freeview	A News
Turkey	Show Türk	Free-to-air Freeview	Show Türk
Turkey	Euro Star	Free-to-air Freeview	
Turkey	Euro D	Free-to-air Freeview	Euro D
Turkey	TGRT EU	Free-to-air Freeview	
Turkey	Kanal 7 Avrupa	Free-to-air Freeview	
Turkey	TV8 Int	Free-to-air Freeview	
Ukraine	UTR	Free-to-air Freeview	
Ukraine	1+1 International	Free-to-air Freeview	
Ukraine	Inter+	Free-to-air Freeview	
United Kingdom	BBC Brit	Free-to-air Freeview (Cable)	BBC Brit
United Kingdom	BBC Earth	Free-to-air Freeview (Cable)	BBC Earth
United Kingdom	BBC First	Free-to-air Freeview (Cable)	BBC First
United Kingdom	BBC News	Free-to-air Freeview (Terrestrial and Satellite)	BBC News (International)
United Kingdom	CBeebies	Free-to-air Freeview (Cable)	CBeebies
United Kingdom	Sky News	Free-to-air Freeview (Cable)	Sky News
United Kingdom	TRT World London	Free-to-air Freeview (Terrestrial and Satellite)	TRT World London

1. An alliance of France Télévisions & Arte in France, RTBF in Wallonia, Belgium, Radio-Canada & Télé-Québec in Canada, RTS in Switzerland, TVMonaco in Monaco & Réseau Outre-Mer 1ère in Overseas France
2. An alliance of ARD & ZDF in Germany, ORF in Austria & SRF in Switzerland

=== North & South America ===
Country of origin	Name of Television Service	Free-to-air/Encrypted	Website
United States of America	Voice of America	Free-to-air Freeview (Terrestrial and Satellite) 1	
United States of America	CNN International	Free-to-air Freeview (Terrestrial and Satellite)	
United States of America	CNBC World	Encrypted	
United States of America	Fox News International	Free-to-air Freeview (Cable)	
United States of America	Fox Business International	Free-to-air Freeview (Cable)	
An alliance of various Caribbean countries	Caribbean Media Corporation	Syndicated	
Argentina	América Internacional	Free-to-air Freeview (Pay Subscription)	
Argentina	Canal Siete Internacional	Free-to-air Freeview (Pay Subscription)	
Argentina	Telefe Internacional	Free-to-air Freeview (Pay Subscription)	
Argentina	El Trece Internacional	Free-to-air Freeview (Pay Subscription)	
Bolivia	BTV Internacional	Free-to-air Freeview (Pay Subscription)	
Brazil	TV Brasil Internacional	Free-to-air Freeview (Pay Subscription)	
Brazil	Record Internacional	Free-to-air Freeview (Pay Subscription)	
Brazil	Band Internacional	Free-to-air Freeview (Pay Subscription)	
Brazil	TV Globo Internacional	Free-to-air Freeview (Pay Subscription)	
Brazil	SBT Internacional	Free-to-air Freeview (Pay Subscription)	
Chile	TV Chile	Free-to-air Freeview	
Chile	13 Internacional	Free-to-air Freeview (Streaming)	
Colombia	Caracol Internacional	Free-to-air Freeview (Pay Subscription)	
Colombia	RCN Nuestra Tele Internacional	Free-to-air Freeview (Pay Subscription)	
Cuba	Cubavision International	Free-to-air Freeview	
Ecuador	Ecuavisa Internacional	Free-to-air Freeview (Pay Subscription)	
Ecuador	Ecuador TV Internacional	Free-to-air Freeview (Pay Subscription)	
Ecuador	TC Internacional	Free-to-air Freeview (Pay Subscription)	
Mexico	Canal Once Internacional	Free-to-air Freeview (Pay Subscription)	
Mexico	Las Estrellas Internacional	Free-to-air Freeview (Pay Subscription)	
Mexico	Azteca Internacional	Free-to-air Freeview (Pay Subscription)	
Peru	TV Perú Internacional	Free-to-air Freeview (Pay Subscription)	
Peru	Perú Mágico	Free-to-air Freeview (Pay Subscription)	
Peru	América Internacional	Free-to-air Freeview (Pay Subscription)	
Peru	Sur Perú	Free-to-air Freeview (Pay Subscription)	
Puerto Rico	Telemundo Internacional	Free-to-air Freeview (Pay Subscription)	
Uruguay	Canal 4 Internacional	Free-to-air Freeview (Pay Subscription)	
Venezuela	Venevisión Internacional	Free-to-air Freeview (Streaming)	
An alliance of 3 Latin American countries	teleSUR	Free-to-air Freeview	

1. Under United States law (the Smith-Mundt Act of 1948), the Voice of America is forbidden to broadcast directly to American citizens.
2. The countries are Venezuela, Argentina and Cuba.

=== Middle East ===
Country of origin	Name of Television Service	Free-to-air/Encrypted	Website
Iran	Jame Jam TV	Free-to-air Freeview (Terrestrial and Satellite)	
Iran	Press TV	Free-to-air Freeview (Terrestrial and Satellite)	
Iran	Al-Alam News Network	Free-to-air Freeview (Terrestrial and Satellite)	
Iran	Al-Kawthar TV	Free-to-air Freeview (Terrestrial and Satellite)	
Iran	HispanTV	Free-to-air Freeview (Terrestrial and Satellite)	
Iran	Sahar TV	Free-to-air Freeview (Terrestrial and Satellite)	
Israel	i24NEWS	Free-to-air Freeview (Terrestrial and Satellite)	
Lebanon	LBC International	Free-to-air Freeview (Terrestrial and Satellite)	
Qatar	Al Araby	Free-to-air Freeview (Terrestrial and Satellite)	
Qatar	Al Jazeera English	Free-to-air Freeview (Terrestrial and Satellite)	
Qatar	Al Jazeera	Free-to-air Freeview (Terrestrial and Satellite)	
Qatar	Al Jazeera Balkans	Free-to-air Freeview (Terrestrial and Satellite)	
Saudi Arabia	Al Arabiya	Free-to-air Freeview (Terrestrial and Satellite)	
Saudi Arabia	Al Hadath	Free-to-air Freeview (Terrestrial and Satellite)	

=== Asia ===
Country of origin	Name of Television Service	Free-to-air/Encrypted	Website
Brunei	RTB Sukmaindera	Free-to-air Freeview (Terrestrial and Satellite)	RTB Sukmaindera
China	CCTV-4 Chinese International (中国中央电视台中文国际频道)	Free-to-air Freeview (Terrestrial and Satellite)	CCTV-4 America (America); CCTV-4 Asia (Asia–Pacific); CCTV-4 Europe (Europe)
China	CGTN	Free-to-air Freeview (Terrestrial and Satellite)	
China	CGTN Documentary	Free-to-air Freeview (Terrestrial and Satellite)	
India	PB-DD India	Free-to-air Freeview (Terrestrial and Satellite)	
India	WION	Free-to-air Freeview (Terrestrial and Satellite)	
Indonesia	TVRI World	Free-to-air Freeview (Terrestrial and Satellite)	TVRI World
Indonesia	The Indonesia Channel (TIC)	Free-to-air Freeview (Terrestrial and Satellite)	The Indonesian Channel (TIC)
Japan	NHK World-Japan	Free-to-air Freeview (Terrestrial and Satellite)	
Japan	NHK World Premium	Free-to-air Freeview (Terrestrial and Satellite)	
Kazakhstan	Qazaqstan	Free-to-air Freeview (Terrestrial and Satellite)	Qazaqstan
Kazakhstan	Balapan	Free-to-air Freeview (Terrestrial and Satellite)	Balapan
Malaysia	RTM WORLD	Free-to-air Freeview (Terrestrial and Satellite)	RTM WORLD
Mongolia	MNB World	Free-to-air Freeview (Satellite)	MNB World
Myanmar	Myanmar International	Free-to-air Freeview (Terrestrial and Satellite)	
Pakistan	Pakistan TV	Free-to-air Freeview (Terrestrial and Satellite)	
Pakistan	PTV Global	Free-to-air Freeview (Cable and Satellite)	
Philippines	TFC	Free-to-air Freeview (Terrestrial and Satellite)	
Philippines	GMA Pinoy TV	Free-to-air Freeview (Terrestrial and Satellite)	
Philippines	Kapatid Channel International	Free-to-air Freeview (Terrestrial and Satellite)	
Singapore	CNA	Free-to-air Freeview (Terrestrial and Satellite)	CNA
South Korea	KBS World	Free-to-air Freeview (Terrestrial and Satellite)	
South Korea	KBS Korea	Free-to-air Freeview (Satellite and Streaming)	
South Korea	Arirang	Free-to-air Freeview (Terrestrial and Satellite)	
Taiwan	TaiwanPlus	Free-to-air Freeview (Terrestrial and Satellite)	
Thailand	NBT World	Free-to-air Freeview (Terrestrial and Satellite)	
Vietnam	VTV4	Free-to-air Freeview (Terrestrial and Satellite)	
Vietnam	Vietnam Today	Free-to-air Freeview (Terrestrial and Satellite)	

=== Oceania ===
Country of origin	Name of Television Service	Free-to-air/Encrypted	Website
Australia	ABC Australia	Free-to-air Freeview (Terrestrial and Satellite)	ABC Asia (Asia–Pacific); ABC Pacific (Pacific)
New Zealand	TVNZ	Free-to-air Freeview (Terrestrial and Satellite)	TVNZ

Internationally, TVNZ has helped provide television services in Pacific Island nations such as the Cook Islands, Fiji, and the Solomon Islands.

TVNZ provides much of the programming but scheduling and continuity are done locally.

- Because of its history TVNZ has inherited and developed its own services in the production and broadcasting services area.
- These include The New Zealand Television Archive, production facilities, television school.
- TVNZ also operated a satellite services division organising and downlink facilities and across the globe, but this service was wound down in 2005.

Both TV One and TV2 are also available "in the clear" over DVB-S on Optus B1. A SKY TV set-top box is not required as any DVB-S satellite set-top box or tuner will work.

=== Africa ===
Country of origin	Name of Television Service	Free-to-air/Encrypted	Website
Algeria	AL24 News	Free-to-air	
Egypt	Nile TV International		
Kenya	A24 news channel		
Kenya	Africa 24	Encrypted	
Mali	Africable	Encrypted	
Morocco	Medi1 TV	Free-to-air	
Nigeria	Africa Independent Television	Free-to-air/Encrypted	www.ait.live
Nigeria	Arise News	Free-to-air/Encrypted	
Nigeria	TVC News	Free-to-air/Encrypted	
Republic of the Congo	Presse Africaine	Encrypted	
Somalia	SNTV	Encrypted	
South Africa	SABC News	Encrypted	
South Africa	eNCA	Encrypted	
South Africa	Newzroom Afrika	Encrypted	

== Former international broadcasters ==
Country	Former Service	Date Ceased
German Democratic Republic	Radio Berlin International	2 October 1990
Malta and Libya	Voice of the Mediterranean	1 January 2002
Norway	Radio Norway International	1 January 2002
Austria	Radio Österreich International	2003
Austria	Ö1 International	31 December 2024
Georgia	Radio Georgia	2005
Hungary	Radio Budapest	1 July 2007
Hungary	Duna World Rádió	13 June 2024
Singapore	Radio Singapore International	31 July 2008
Singapore	Singapore International Television	2000
Malaysia	Voice of Malaysia	31 August 2011
Belgium (Flanders)	Radio Vlaanderen Internationaal ^{1}	31 December 2011
Belgium (Wallonia)	RTBF Sat	15 February 2010
Belgium (Wallonia)	RTBF International	July 2019
Italy	Rai Italia Radio	31 December 2011
Netherlands	Radio Netherlands Worldwide	31 December 2012
Moldova	TV Moldova Internațional	1 January 2013
Serbia	International Radio of Serbia	31 July 2015
Poland	Polsat 2	25 December 2015 (International)
Thailand	MCOT World	12 October 2016
Sweden	SVT World	30 April 2017
Germany	RTL International	31 May 2017
Germany	ProSiebenSat.1 Welt	31 December 2023
Turkey	NTV Avrupa	20 June 2017
United Kingdom	ITV Choice	20 August 2019 (Malta, Middle East and Asia); 4 June 2020 (Africa)
United Kingdom	BBC Entertainment	31 March 2024
France	Canal+ International	31 January 2020 (Canada)
Spain	CincoMAS	21 May 2020
Angola	TPA Internacional	18 July 2022
Ukraine	Ukraina 1	22 July 2022
Ukraine	Ukraina 2	22 July 2022
Ukraine	Ukraina 3	22 July 2022
Ukraine	NLO TV 1	22 July 2022
Ukraine	NLO TV 2	22 July 2022
Ukraine	Ukraina 24 International	22 July 2022
Ukraine	ICTV Ukraine	17 December 2022
Thailand	TGN	10 January 2023
Bangladesh	BTV World	31 December 2024
Indonesia	SEA Today	30 June 2025
Ireland	RTÉ Radio 1 Extra	31 December 2025

1. Radio Vlaanderen Internationaal was replaced with internet and satellite broadcasts of Radio 1 and Radio 2.

== See also ==
- U.S. Agency for Global Media
- International BBC television channels
- List of world news channels
- List of shortwave radio broadcasters
