= List of broadcasting languages by country =

Foreign broadcasting is broadcasting with a foreign element.

The foreign element may be the territory of the audience, its ethnicity, or both.

- Foreign country and ethnicity: an external service aimed at foreign societies in general. Its purpose may be information about the country of origin, about the target country from an outside point of view as well as missionary or commercial purposes.
- Foreign territory: an external service aimed at expatriates. A special audience among expatriates is armed forces personnel, for whom broadcasting is often done not only from the home country, but also from within the country of deployment.
- Foreign ethnicity: a service for foreign communities within the country of broadcasting (like migrants, refugees, tourists), which in turn is to be distinguished from broadcasting for indigenous and other non-foreign groups (see also Minority language broadcasting).

== List of radio services ==
External and selected other foreign language audio broadcasting services

Country	Area	Broadcaster	Years	Active languages	Former languages	Website
Afghanistan	As	Radio Afghanistan	1940–	02: **eng**, urd	**ara**, bal, prs, **fre**, **ger**, pus	
Albania	Eu	Radio Tirana	1938–	07: **eng**, **fre**, **ger**, gre, ita, srb	alb, **ara**, bul, **cmn**, cze, hun, ind, **per**, pol, **por**, rum, **rus**, **spa**, swe, **tur**	
Algeria	Ar	RAI	?	04: **ara**, **eng**, **fre**, **spa**		
Angola	Af	RNA	1977?–	04?: **eng**, **fre**, lin, **por**	**spa**	
Argentina	Am	RAE	1949–	08: **cmn**, **eng**, **fre**, **ger**, ita, jpn, **por**, **spa**	**ara**	
Armenia	As	Armradio	?	08: **ara**, aii, gre, kur, kmr, **per**, **rus**, **tur**	aze, **eng**, **fre**, geo, **ger**, **spa**	
Australia	Pac	Radio Australia	1939(1931)–	01: **eng**	**cmn**, yue, **fre**, ind, jpn, tha, tpi, vie	
Australia	Pac	SBS	1975–	68: alb, amh, **ara**, arm, aii, ben, bos, bul, bur, **cmn**, yue, hak, hrv, cze, prs, din, dut, est, fil, fin, **fre**, **ger**, gre, guj, heb, hin, hmn, hun, ind, ita, jpn, kar, khm, run, kor, kur, lao, mac, mal, mlt, mon, nep, pus, **per**, pol, **por**, pan, rhg, rum, **rus**, smo, srb, sin, slo, slv, som, **spa**, swa, tam, tel, tha, tib, tir, **tur**, ukr, urd, vie, yid	fij, kan, lav, lit, may, mao, nor, swe, ton	
Austria	Eu	RÖI	1955(1929)–	02: **eng**, **fre**	**ara**, epo, **ger**, **spa**	
Azerbaijan	As	AzTV	195?–	01: **rus**	**ara**, aze, **eng**, **fre**, **ger**, **per**, **tur**	
Bahrain	Ar	Radio Bahrain	1977–	01: **eng**		
Bangladesh	As	Bangladesh Betar	1971?–	06: **ara**, ben, **eng**, hin, nep, urd		
Belarus	Eu	Radio Belarus	1962–	08: bel 1962, **cmn** 2012, **eng** 1998, **fre** 2010, **ger** 1985, pol 2006, **rus** 1998, **spa** 2010	-	
Belgium	Eu	RVi	1934/77–2011	-	dut, **eng**, **fre**, **ger**, **spa**	
Belgium	Eu	RTBFi	1999–	01: **fre**	**ger** (BRF)	
Brazil	Am	Radiobrás	1975?–2007?	-	**eng**, **ger**, **por**	
Bulgaria	Eu	Radio Bulgaria	1937–	11: alb, **ara**, bul, **eng**, **fre**, **ger**, gre, **por**, srb, **spa**, **tur**	ita	
Cambodia	As	RNK	1956?–	02: **eng**, **fre**	lao, tha, vie	
Canada	Am	RCI	1945–	05: **ara**, **cmn**, **eng**, **fre**, **spa**	cze, **ger**, hun, jpn, pol, **por**, **rus**, slo, ukr	
China	As	CRI	1941–	51?: alb, **ara**, bel, ben, bul, bur, **cmn**/yue/nan/hak, hrv, cze, **eng** 1947, epo, fil, **fre** 1958, **ger** 1960, gre, hau, heb, hin 1959, hun, ind, ita, jpn 1941, kaz, khm, kor 1950, kir, lao, may, mon, nep, pus, **per**, pol, **por**, rum, rus 1954, srb, sin, **spa**, swa, tam, tha, tib, **tur**, ukr, urd, uig, vie		,
China	As	Voice of Tibet	?	01: **eng**		
Croatia	Eu	Voice of Croatia	1991–	04: hrv, **eng**, **ger**, **spa**	hun, ita	
Cuba	Am	RHC	1961–	06: **ara**, **eng**, epo, **fre**, **por**, **spa**	cpf, grn, que	
Czech Republic	Eu	Radio Prague	1936–	06: cze, **eng**, **fre**, **ger**, rus, **spa**	**ara**, ita, **por**, slo	
Denmark	Eu	DR	1928–2003	-	dan	
Egypt	Ar	European Program	1934–	06: arm, **eng**, **fre**, **ger**, gre, ita		
Egypt	Ar	Radio Cairo	1953–	18: aar, alb, amh, **ara**, prs, **eng**, **fre**, ful, **ger**, hau, ita, pus, **rus**, som, swa, **tur**, urd, uzb	aze, bam, ben, hin, ind, lin, may, nde, **per**, **por**, sna, **spa**, tgk, tha, wol, yor, zul	
Estonia	Eu	EER4	195?–	01: **rus**	**eng**, est, fin, swe	
Ethiopia	Af	Radio Ethiopia	?	05: aar, **ara**, **eng** (also 104.7), **fre**, som	amh	
Finland	Eu	Yle	1939–58 & 1967–	03: **eng**, fin (easy), lat 1989–	**fre** 1987–2002, **ger** 1985–2002, **rus**, swe	,
France	Eu	RFI, MCD	1931–	13: **ara**, **cmn**, **eng**, **fre**, hau, khm, mande, **por**, rum, **rus**, **spa**, swa, vie	cpf, **ger**, pol, scr	,
Georgia	As	Radio Georgia	?	-	abk, arm, aze, **eng**, **fre**, geo, **ger**, **rus**	
Germany	Eu	DW (DLF)	1953(1929)–	10: **ara** 1959, amh 1965, prs 1970, **eng** 1954, **fre** 1954, gre 1964, hau 1963, pus 1970, **por** 1954, swa 1963	ben, bul, cze (DLF), dan (DLF), dut (DLF), **ger**, hin, hun (DLF), ind, ita (DLF), jpn, mac, nor, **per**, pol (DLF), rum, **rus**, san, scr, slo (DLF), slv, **spa**, swe, **tur**, urd	
Germany	Eu	WDR Cosmo	1964/1998–	09: **ara**, gre, ita, kur, pol, **rus**, scr, **spa**, **tur**		
East Germany	Eu	RBI	1959–1990	-	**ara**, **eng**, **fre**, **ger**, hin, ita, **por**, **spa**, swa, swe	
Greece	Eu	Voice of Greece	1940/47–	01: gre	alb, **ara**, bul, **eng**, **fre**, **ger**, ita, pol, **por**, rum, **rus**, scr, **spa**, swe, **tur**	
Hungary	Eu	Radio Budapest; Duna	1934–2007; 2012–	01: hun	**eng**, **ger**, hun, ita, **spa**, **tur**	
India	As	AIR	1939–	26: **ara**, bal, ben, bur, **cmn**, prs, **eng**, **fre**, guj, hin, ind, kan, mal, nep, pus, **per**, pan, **rus**, snd, sin, swa, tam, tel, tha, tib, urd	yue	
Indonesia	As	VOI	1945–	08: **ara**, **cmn**, **eng**, **fre**, **ger**, ind, jpn, **spa**	kor, may, tha	
Iran	As	IRIB	1956–	27: **ara**, alb, arm, ben, **cmn**, prs, **eng**, **fre**, **ger**, hau, heb, hin, ind, ita, jpn, kaz, pus, **per**, **por**, **rus**, **spa**, swa, tgk, tly, **tur**, urd, uzb	aii, aze, bal, kur, tuk	
Iraq	As	Radio Baghdad	?	-	**ara**, aze, **eng**, **fre**, **ger**, heb, kur, **per**, **rus**, **spa**, urd	
Israel	As	Kan Reka	1948–	09: amh 1984, bhh 1975, **eng** 1948, **fre** 1948, geo 1970, lad 1948, **rus** 1958, **spa** 1952, yid 1948	heb, hun, **per**, **por**, rum	
Italy	Eu	Rai	1930–2011	-	alb, amh, **ara**, bul, cze, dan, **eng**, epo, **fre**, **ger**, gre, hun, ita, lit, pol, **por**, rum, **rus**, scr, slo, slv, som, **spa**, swe, **tur**, ukr	
Japan	As	NHK World	1935–	18: **ara**, ben, bur, **cmn**, **eng**, **fre**, hin, ind, jpn, kor, **per**, **por**, **rus**, **spa**, swa, tha, urd, vie	**ger**, ita, may, swe	
Jordan	Ar	Radio Jordan	?	01: **eng**		
Kazakhstan	As	KazTRK	?	04: **rus**; **ger**, kor, uig	kaz; aze, tat, **tur**	(Достық)
Kenya	Af	KBC	?	01: **eng**		
South Korea	As	KBS World Radio	1953–	11: **ara**, **cmn**, **eng**, **fre**, **ger**, ind, jpn, kor, **rus**, **spa**, vie	**por**	
North Korea	As	Voice of Korea	1945–	09: **ara**, **cmn**, **eng**, **fre**, **ger**, jpn, kor, **rus**, **spa**		
Kuwait	Ar	RK FM	?	01: **eng**		
Kyrgyzstan	As	KTRK Dostuk	?	08: dng, pol, **rus**, ukr, uig, tat, **tur**, uzb	**ger**	
Laos	As	LNR	?	06?: **cmn**, **eng**, **fre**, khm, tha, vie		
Latvia	Eu	LR	?–2001	-	lav, **rus**, swe	
Libya	Ar	Voice of Africa	?–2011	-	**ara**, **eng**, **fre**	
Lithuania	Eu	LRT	195?–	-	**eng**, lit, pol, **rus**	
Luxembourg	Eu	Radio Luxembourg	1933–1992	-	dut, **eng**, **fre**, **ger**, ita	
North Macedonia	Eu	MR3	1945?–	06: alb, rup, bos, rom, srb, **tur**	bul, gre	
Malaysia	As	Voice of Malaysia	1963–2011	-	**ara**, bur, **cmn**, **eng**, ind, may, tgl, tha	
Mexico	Am	XERMX-OC	1969–	01: **spa**		
Mongolia	As	Voice of Mongolia	1964–	05: **cmn** 1964, **eng** 1965, jpn 1989, mon 1964, **rus**	**fre**	
Myanmar	As	MRTV	?	01: **eng**		
Nepal	As	Radio Nepal	1951?–	01: **eng** (अंग्रेजी समाचार)		
Netherlands	Eu	RNW	1947–2012	-	**ara**, dut, **eng**, **fre**, pap, **por**, **spa**, sra	
New Zealand	Pac	RNZI	1948–	07: **eng**, **fre**, niu, pis, rar, smo, ton		
Nigeria	Af	Voice of Nigeria	1961–	08: **ara**, **eng**, **fre**, ful, hau, ibo, swa, yor		
Norway	Eu	RNI	1938/48–2001/03	-	**eng**, nor	
Oman	Ar	Radio Oman	?	01: **eng**		
Pakistan	As	Radio Pakistan	1947?–	14: bft, ben, **cmn**, prs, guj, hin, nep, pus, **per**, scl, sin, tam, urd; **eng**	**ara**, asm, bur, **fre**, ind, **rus**, swa, **tur**, uig	
Philippines	As	DZRP	1972–	02: **eng**, fil		
Poland	Eu	Polish Radio	1936–	06: bel, **eng**, **ger**, pol, **rus**, ukr	**ara**, dan, epo, fin, **fre**, ita, **spa**, swe	
Portugal	Eu	RDPi	1935?–	01: **por**	**eng**, **fre**, ita	
Qatar	Ar	Qatar Radio	?	03: **eng**, **fre**, urd		
Romania	Eu	RRI	1939–	12: **ara**, rup, **cmn**, **eng**, **fre**, **ger**, ita, rum, **rus**, srb, **spa**, ukr	gre, **per**, **por**, **tur**	
Russia	Eu	Sputnik	1929/2014–	31: abk, **ara**, arm, aze, bel, **cmn**, cze, prs, **eng**, est, **fre**, geo, **ger**, ita, jpn, kaz, kur, kir, lav, lit, oss, **per**, pol, **por**, srb, **spa**, tgk, **tur**, uzb, vie	afr, alb, amh, asm, bam, ben, bul, bur, cat, yue, dan, dut, fin, ful, gre, guj, hau, hin, hun, ind, kan, khm, kor, lao, mac, mlg, may, mal, mar, mon, nde, nep, nor, pus, pan, rum, **rus**, scr, sin, slo, slv, sna, som, swa, swe, tgl, tam, tel, tha, urd, zul	
Saudi Arabia	Ar	SBC	?	12: **ara**, ben, **fre**, ind, pus, som, swa, tgk, **tur**, tuk, urd, uzb	bam, **eng**, **per**	
Serbia	Eu	International Radio of Serbia	1936–2015	-	alb, **ara**, bul, **cmn**, **eng**, **fre**, **ger**, gre, hun, ita, **rus**, srb, **spa**	
Singapore	As	RSI	1994–2007	-	**cmn**, **eng**, ind, may	
Slovakia	Eu	RSI	1993–	06: **eng**, **fre**, **ger**, **rus**, slo, **spa**		
Slovenia	Eu	RSi	?	03: **eng**, **ger**, slv		
South Africa	Af	Channel Africa	1966/1992–	06: nya, **eng**, **fre**, loz, **por**, swa	afr, dan, dut, **ger**, kua/ndo, **spa**, tso	
Soviet Union	Eu	RPP	1964–1991	-	**ara**, aze, cpf, **eng**, **ger**, grn, heb, **per**, **por**, **spa**, yid	
Spain	Eu	REE	1942–	06: **ara**, **eng**, **fre**, lad, **por**, **rus**, **spa**		
Sri Lanka	As	SLBC	?	05: ben, **eng**, hin, sin, tam	kan, mal, nep, tel	
Sweden	Eu	Radio Sweden	1938–	06: **ara**, **eng**, kur, **per**, som, swe (easy)	est, **fre**, **ger**, **por**, **rus**, **spa**	
Switzerland	Eu	SRI	1930–2004	-	**ara**, **eng**, epo, **fre**, **ger**, ita, **por**, roh, **spa**	
Syria	Ar	Radio Damascus	1957–	06: **ara**, **eng**, **fre**, **ger**, **rus**, **spa**, **tur**	heb	
Taiwan	As	RTI	1939–	13: **cmn**/yue/nan/hak, **eng**, **fre**, **ger**, ind, jpn, **rus**, **spa**, tha, vie	**ara**, kor	
Taiwan	As	ICRT	1979–	01: **eng**		
Tajikistan	As	Radio Tajikistan	?	-	**ara**, prs, **eng**, **per**, **rus**, uzb	
Thailand	As	RTWS	1938–	10: bur, **cmn**, **eng**, **fre**, jpn, khm, lao, may, tha, vie		
Transnistria	Eu	Radio Pridnestrovie	1991–2014	-	**eng**, **fre**, **ger**, **rus**	
Tunisia	Ar	RTCI	1960–	05: **eng**, **fre**, **ger**, ita, **spa**		
Turkey	As	Voice of Turkey	1937–	32: alb, **ara**, arm, aze, bul, **cmn**, prs, **eng**, **fre**, geo, **ger**, gre, hau, hun, ita, jpn, kaz, kir, mac, may, pus, **per**, **por**, **rus**, **spa**, swa, tat, **tur**, tuk, urd, uig, uzb	rum, scr	
Northern Cyprus	As	Bayrak	?	05: **ara**, **eng**, **fre**, **ger**, gre, **rus**		
Ukraine	Eu	RUI	1950	03: **eng**, **ger**, rum	**rus**, ukr	
United Arab Emirates	Ar	ARN Dubai Eye	?	01: **eng**		
United Kingdom (public)	Eu	BBC WS	1932–	37: amh 2017, **ara** 1938, aze 1994, ben 1941, bur 1940, yue 1941, **eng** 1932, **fre** 1938, guj 2017, hau 1957, hin 1940, ind 1949, kin 1994, kor 2017, kir 1995, Marathi language 2017, nep 1969, pcm 2017, orm 2017, pan 2017, pus 1981, **per** 1940, **por** 1938, **rus** 1942, sin 1942/90, som 1957, **spa** 1938, swa 1957, tam 1941, tel 2017, tha 1941, tir 2017, **tur** 1939, ukr 1992, urd 1949, uzb 1994, vie 1952	afr, alb, bul, **cmn**, cze, dan, dut, fin, **ger**, gre, guj, heb, hun, ice, ita, jpn, kaz, ltz, mac, may, mlt, nor, pol, rum, **rus**, scr, slo, slv, swe	
United Kingdom (military)	Eu	BFBS	1943–	02: **eng**, nep		
United Nations	Am	United Nations Radio	1946(1929)–	11: **ara**, ben, **cmn**, **eng**, **fre**, hin, **por**, **rus**, **spa**, swa, urd		
United States (public)	Am	VoA	1942–	31: amh 1982, bam 2013, ben 1958, bur 1943, **cmn** 1941, yue 1941, cpf 1987, prs 1980, **eng** 1941, **fre** 1942, hau 1979, ind 1942, khm 1955, kin/run 1996, kor 1942, kur 1992, lao 1962, nde 2003, orm 1996, pus 1982, **por** 1942, sna 2003, som 1992, **spa** 1941, swa 1962, tha 1942, tib 1991, tir 1996, urd 1951, uzb 1958/72, vie 1943	alb, **ara**, arm, aze, bul, cze, est, geo, **ger**, gre, hin, hun, ita, jpn, lav, lit, **per**, pol, rum, **rus**, scr, slv, **tur**, ukr	
United States (public)	Am	RFE/RL	1951–	17: alb (RFE), arm (RL), aze (RL), bel (RL), prs (RL), geo (RL), kir (RL), mac (RFE), pus (RL), **per** (RL), rum (RFE), **rus** (RL), srb (RFE), tgk (RL), tuk (RL), ukr (RL), uzb (RL)	bak (RL), bul (RFE), cze (RFE), est (RFE), hun (RFE), kaz (RL), lav (RFE), lit (RFE), pol (RFE), slo (RFE), tat (RL)	
United States (public)	Am	Radio Martí	1985–	01: **spa**		
United States (public)	Am	RFA	1996(1951)–	09: bur, **cmn**, yue, khm, kor, lao, tib, uig, vie		
United States (public)	Am	Radio Sawa	2002–	01: **ara**		
United States (military)	Am	AFN	1942–	01: **eng**		,
United States (religious)	Am	TWR	1954–	more than 230		
Uzbekistan	As	Radio Tashkent	195?–	-	**ara**, **cmn**, prs, **eng**, **ger**, hin, kaz, pus, **per**, **rus**, tat, **tur**, uig, urd, uzb	
Vatican City	Eu	Vatican Radio	1931–	37: alb 1951, amh 1948, **ara** 1949, arm 1966, bel 1950, bul 1949, **cmn** 1950, hrv 1947, cze 1947, **eng** 1937, epo 1976, fin 1975, **fre** 1931, **ger** 1937, heb, hin 1965, hun 1939, ita 1931, jpn 1959, kor, lav 1948, lit 1940, mac, mal 1965, pol 1938, **por** 1940, rum 1947, **rus** 1948, slo 1947, slv 1947, **spa** 1934, swa, swe 1953, tam 1965, tig, ukr 1939, vie 1980	dan, est, nor, som, urd	
Venezuela	Am	Voz de Venezuela	1976–?	-	**spa**	
Vietnam	As	VOV5	1945–	12: **cmn**, **eng**, **fre**, **ger**, ind, jpn, khm, lao, **rus**, **spa**, tha, vie	yue	

Bold: 10 major international broadcasting languages (Arabic, Chinese, English, French, German, Persian, Portuguese, Russian, Spanish, Turkish)
Italic: major language(s) of the respective country

== List of TV services ==
Selected external and other foreign language TV services

Country	Broadcaster	Launched	Languages	Website
Australia	Australia Plus	1993/2014	English	
China	CGTN	1997 on CCTV-4	Arabic, English, French, Russian, Spanish	
China	CCTV-4	1992	Chinese	
China	CNC World	2010	Chinese, English	
Cuba	Cubavision Internacional	1986	Spanish	
European Union	Euronews	1993	Arabic, English, French, German, Greek, Hungarian, Italian, Spanish, Persian, Portuguese, Russian, Turkish	
France	France 24	2006	Arabic, English, French, Spanish	
France; Belgium; Switzerland; Canada	TV5Monde	1984	French	
Germany	DW-TV	1992	Arabic, English, German, Spanish	
Germany; Austria; Switzerland	3sat	1984	German	
India	DD India	1995	Hindi	
India	DD News	2003	English, Hindi, Sanskrit	
Iran	Press TV	2007	English	
Iran	HispanTV	2011	Spanish	
Iran	Al-Alam	2003	Arabic	
Iran	Sahar TV	1997	Azerbaijani, English, French, Kurdish, Urdu	
Israel	i24news	2013	Arabic, English, French	
Japan	NHK World	1998	English, Japanese	
Kazakhstan	Kazakh TV	2002	English, Kazakh, Russian	
South Korea	Arirang	1997	English	
South Korea	KBS World	2003	Korean	
Myanmar	mitv	2001	English	
Netherlands; Belgium	BVN	1996	Dutch	
Pakistan	PTV Global	2006	Urdu	
Pakistan	PTV World	2003	English	
Poland	TVP Polonia	1992	Polish	
Poland	itvn	2004	Polish	
Poland	Belsat TV	2007	Belarusian	
Qatar	Al Jazeera	1996	Arabic, Bosnian/Croatian/Serbian, English	
Russia	RT	2005	Arabic, English, Spanish	
Saudi Arabia	Saudi 2	1983?	English	
South Africa	eNCA	2008	English	
Thailand	Thai Global Network	1998	English, Thai	
Turkey	TRT	1990	Arabic, English, Turkish	
United Kingdom	BBC	1991	Arabic, English, Persian	
United States (private)	CNN	1985	English, Spanish	
United States (public)	VoA	198?	Albanian, Bambara, Bosnian, Burmese, Chinese, Creole, Dari, English, French, Indonesian, Macedonian, Ndebele, Pashto, Persian, Russian, Serbian, Shona, Spanish, Tibetan, Turkish, Ukrainian, Urdu, Vietnamese	
United States (public)	TV Martí	1990	Spanish	
United States (public)	Alhurra	2004	Arabic	
United States (public)	RFE/RL	?	Russian (Настоящее Время), Kyrgyz, Persian, Tajik	
United States (military)	AFN	1954–	English	
Venezuela	Telesur	2005	Spanish	
Vietnam	VTV4	1998	Chinese, English, Russian, Vietnamese	
