= Polonaises Op. 40 (Chopin) =

Composition by Chopin

- by Frédéric Chopin
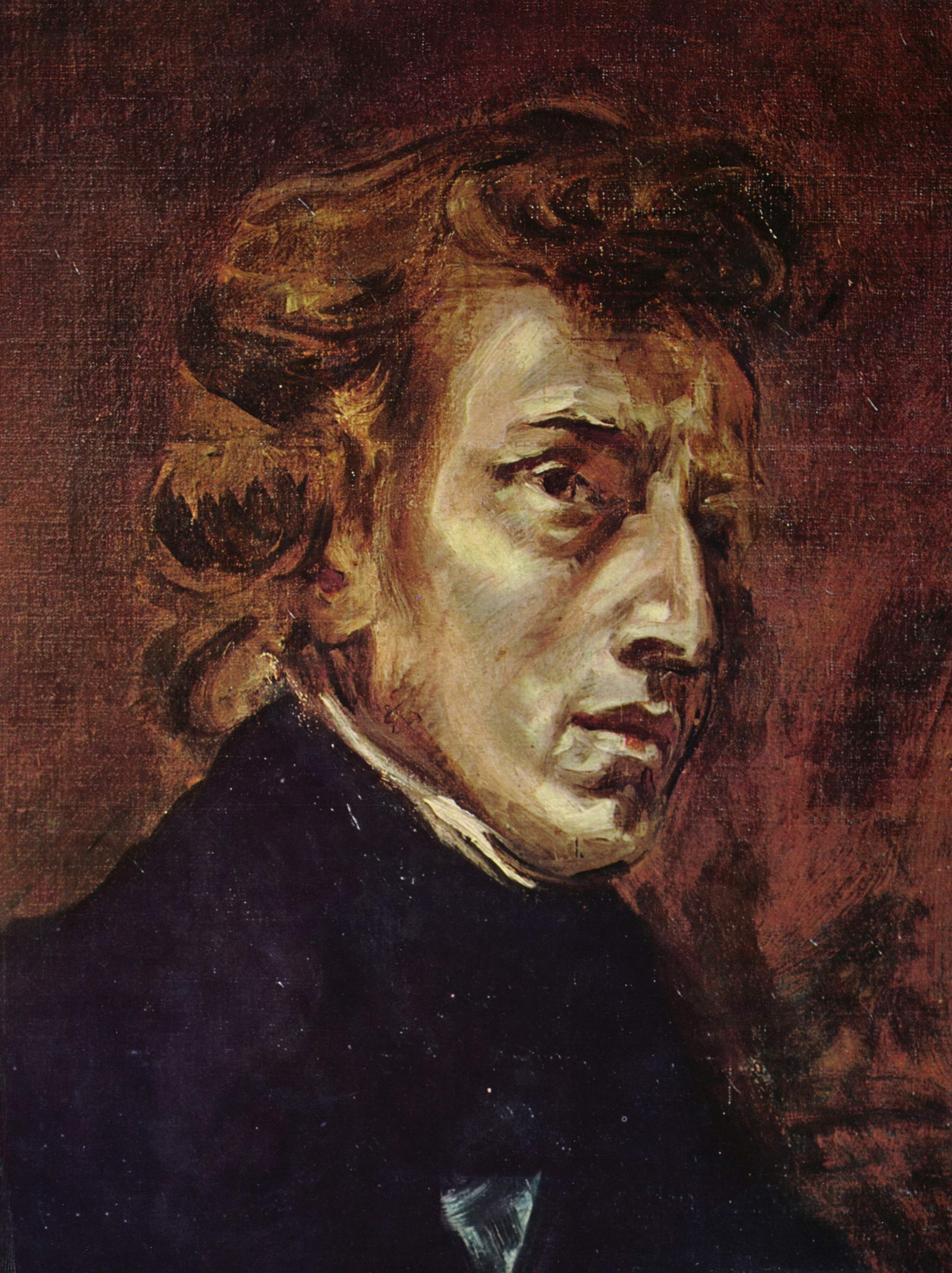
- Chopin at the time of this composition
- Full title: Polonaise in A major, Op. 40
- Other name: Military Polonaise (No. 1)
- Composed: 1838

Frédéric Chopin's two Op. 40 Polonaises were composed in 1838. Chopin originally intended to dedicate the first to Tytus Woyciechowski, but he ultimately dedicated both works to Julian Fontana.

Arthur Rubinstein remarked that the Polonaise in A major is the symbol of Polish glory, whilst the Polonaise in C minor is the symbol of Polish tragedy.

== Pieces ==
=== No. 1 in A major ===
Polonaise Op. 40 No. 1
Performed by Romuald Greiss on an 1850 Budynowicz piano

Nicknamed the Military Polonaise, this piece is in expanded ternary form with the structure (A–A–B–A-B–A)(C–C–D–C-D–C)(A–B–A), where the A and B sections and C and D sections are repeated as a group, and the original theme returning at the end without repeats.

The beginning opens with an A major chord and continues in a typical polonaise rhythm. The key then changes into D major in the middle of the polonaise for a trio section, after which the opening is repeated with no changes except disregarding the repeat signs. The piece is almost entirely played forte or louder.

During the September 1939 German invasion of Poland at the outset of World War II, Polskie Radio broadcast this piece daily as nationalistic protest, and to rally the Polish people.

The beginning of this piece is used as the interval signal for Polskie Radio.

It is used in the opening and closing credits of the film classic To Be or Not to Be (1942). This piece is played in the famous scene in the Polish film Ashes and Diamonds at the end of an all-night party celebrating the end of the war. In Season 3, episode 2 of Rectify, the closing credits roll to the A major Polonaise after Teddy is shown stalking Tawny, his estranged wife.

=== No. 2 in C minor ===
Polonaise in C minor, Op. 40, No. 2 performed by Luis Sarro

The second polonaise's main theme, a contrast to the majestic and joyful one in the first, features an even rhythm of quaver chords in the right hand starting with C minor, and a mournful melody played in octaves by the left, with occasional lines played by the right hand. It is interspersed with a more serene theme, before switching to the trio section in A♭ major, which incorporates typical polonaise rhythms. The main theme is then repeated but largely abridged, with an added dramatic melody in the right hand.

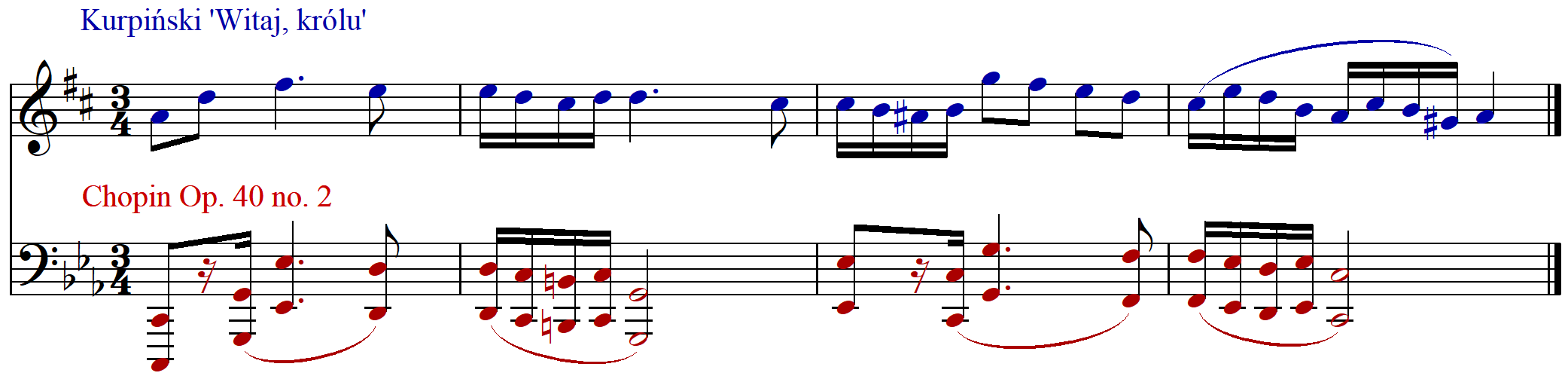
Comparison of first themes of Karol Kurpiński's 'Witaj, królu' with Chopin's Polonaise in c minor, Op. 40 no. 2

According to the analysis of Zdzisław Jachimecki, the thematic material of this polonaise may originate from Chopin's tragic rethinking of Karol Kurpiński's so-called "coronation" polonaise 'Witaj królu polskiej ziemi' (Polish: 'Hail the king of Polish land'), composed on occasion of the ascension to power of the Russian emperor Nicholas I, soon-to-be crowned King of Poland (in Warsaw in 1829).
