= Radio Peace and Progress =

Soviet Union foreign broadcasting radio station

Radio Station Peace and Progress (RPP; Russian: Радиостанция Мир и Прогресс) was a foreign broadcasting radio station of the Soviet Union besides Radio Moscow and the external services of the union republics.

== History ==
The predecessor of RPP was Radio Peace (or Radio Peace and Freedom), transmitted from Szolnok, Hungary, from April 27, 1950. Programs were edited in Moscow in English, Arabic, Finnish, French, Greek, German, Italian, Serbian, Slovenian and Turkish. It became Radio Freedom and transmitted from Szolnok from January 10, 1954, on 1187 kHz. RPP was established in 1964 as a Soviet answer to the American Radio Free Europe/Radio Liberty and ceased broadcasting in May 1991.

== Tendency ==
RPP presented itself as ″the voice of the Soviet public opinion″. The ″public″ (as opposed to government or party) organizations which sponsored RPP broadcasts included three of the creative unions in the Soviet Union (journalists, writers, composers), Novosti news agency, the Union of Societies of Friendship and Cultural Relations with Foreign Countries, the Znaniye Society (a lecture and public information organization), the Soviet Peace Committee, the Committee of Youth Organisations, and the Soviet Women's Committee.

Although the themes addressed were standard ones that followed the official line, RPP broadcasts were sometimes notably more tendentious and outspoken than those of Radio Moscow, purveying propaganda lines for which the Soviet government might wish to disclaim responsibility.

== Languages ==
Languages offered by both RPP and Radio Moscow: Arabic, Chinese, English, French, German, Mongolian, Persian, Portuguese, Spanish.

Languages covered by RPP, but not by Radio Moscow: Azerbaijani, Creole, Guarani, Hebrew, Yiddish.

== See also ==
- Radio Moscow
