= Telecommunications in São Tomé and Príncipe =

The following is a list of information related to telecommunications in São Tomé and Príncipe.

- Telephones – Main lines in use: 3,000 (1995)
- Telephones – mobile cellular: available, working more accurately than landlines
- Telephone system:
  - domestic: minimal system
  - international: satellite earth station – 1 Intelsat (Atlantic Ocean)
- Radio broadcast stations: AM 2, FM 4, shortwave 0 (1998)
- Radios: 38,000 (1997)
- Television broadcast stations: 2 (1997)
- Televisions: 23,000 (1997)
- Internet service providers (ISPs): available, dial-up low quality, "broad band" (128/256) costly.
- Country code (top-level domain): .st

== See also ==
- Media of São Tomé and Príncipe
