= Guadeloupe La Première =

- Country: Guadeloupe, France
- Network: La Première
- Headquarters: Pointe-à-Pitre, Guadeloupe

Programming
- Language: French
- Picture format: 576i SDTV

Ownership
- Owner: France Télévisions

History
- Launched: 22 December 1964; 61 years ago
- Former names: ORTF Télé Guadeloupe (1967–1975); FR3-Guadeloupe (1975–1982); RFO Guadeloupe (1983–1988); RFO 1 Guadeloupe (1988–1999); Télé Guadeloupe(1999–2010); Guadeloupe 1^{re} (2010–2018)

Links
- Website: la1ere.francetvinfo.fr/guadeloupe/

Availability

Terrestrial
- TNT: Channel 1

Guadeloupe La Première (French pronunciation: [ɡwad(ə)lup la pʁəmjɛʁ], lit. 'Guadeloupe the First'), is a French overseas departmental free-to-air television channel available in the department of Guadeloupe, and also covers the collectivities of Saint Barthélemy and Saint Martin, operated by the overseas unit of France Télévisions.

== History ==
Télé Guadeloupe started broadcasting on 21 December 1964, from a main transmitter on VHF channel 8, located at Pointe-à-Pitre, later adding supplementary relay stations at Basse-Terre (channel 5) in February 1966, and, at a later date, at Morne à Louis (channel 6). The station was initially a non-commercial operation. Maggy Nithila was its first continuity announcer.

Following the breakup of the O.R.T.F. on 31 December 1974, the regional television stations of French overseas territories were integrated into the new national program company France Régions 3 (FR3), the new French regional channel, within the FR3 DOM-TOM delegation. The channel became FR3-Martinique on 6 January 1975, and, like each metropolitan regional station, produces and broadcasts a regional television news program, but is also responsible for ensuring territorial continuity in terms of audiovisual media by broadcasting programs from the metropolitan television channels. In 1978, colour broadcasting arrived to Guadeloupe.

In 1983, the channel took the name RFO Guadeloupe following the creation of the national program company RFO (Société de Radiodiffusion et de Télévision Française pour l'Outre-mer) by transfer of the activities of FR3 for overseas territories and dependencies. Its missions remain unchanged but it is also tasked to produce programs. Programming in Antillan Creole was allowed again; it was banned during the ORTF and FR3 administrations. RFO 2 (later Tempo) started broadcasting in 1988; then in September 1989, its transmitter was damaged by Hurricane Hugo (which also knocked out WBNB-TV's transmitter), depriving locals of access to television for a few weeks.

On 1 February 1999, RFO Guadeloupe became Télé Guadeloupe, following the transformation of RFO into Réseau France Outre-mer.

Since July 9, 2004, Télé Guadeloupe has belonged to France Télévisions SA, a single national company into which RFO has become a subsidiary of the single company France Télévisions SA. Its president, Rémy Pflimlin, announced the change of name from Réseau France Outre-mer to Réseau Outre-Mer 1re to adapt to the launch of DTT in the French overseas regions in 2010; the name change took place on 30 November 2010, when TNT started and Télé Guadeloupe thus became Guadeloupe 1re. The name change refers to the leading position of this channel in its broadcast territory as well as its first place on the remote control and its numbering in line with the other channels of the France Télévisions group. On 1 January 2018, following a lawsuit with the cable channel Paris Première, Guadeloupe 1ère became Guadeloupe La 1ère.
