= Presse Africaine =

- Country: Republic of the Congo
- Broadcast area: Worldwide
- Headquarters: Brazzaville

Programming
- Language(s): English, French

Ownership
- Owner: Lassy Mbouity

Links
- Website: www.presseafricaine.fr

Presse Africaine is an international television channel and radio available via satellite, Internet and on local TV stations. Presse Africaine broadcasts in French and English across several countries. Every day, the channel provides coverage of African and World news. Management, based in Republic of the Congo and France, has several associated distributed in Africa and Europe.

Created by Lassy Mbouity in 2010, the channel has an annual budget of about $30,000.

== History ==
Presse Africaine began at the end of 2010, with a program on international news, led by Christ Mbouity, first party associated to the channel. In order to find an international audience, Lassy Mbouity (founder) has announced plans to launch a satellite channel in October 2014, with only 7 hours of programming daily. The channel is now available via the Eutelsat W3A, free and without subscription fees.

== The list of programs ==
The channel broadcasts programs that cover politics, culture, economy, health, education, new technologies and religion.

== Broadcast service in Africa ==
With new equipment, Presse Africaine channel broadcasts its programs through all the 54 African countries according to the following list: South Africa, Algeria, Angola, Benin, Botswana, Burkina Faso, Burundi, Cameroon, Cape Verde, Central African Republic, Comoros, Congo, Democratic Republic of Congo, Ivory Coast, Djibouti, Egypt, Eritrea, Ethiopia, Gabon, Gambia, Ghana, Guinea, Guinea Bissau, Equatorial Guinea, Kenya, Lesotho, Liberia, Libya, Madagascar, Malawi, Mali Morocco, Mauritania, Mauritius, Mozambique, Namibia, Niger, Nigeria, Rwanda São Tomé and Príncipe, Senegal, Seychelles, Sierra Leone, Somalia, Sudan, South Sudan, Swaziland, Tanzania, Chad, Togo, Tunisia, Zambia and Zimbabwe.

== Broadcast service in America ==
In the American continent, Presse Africaine on satellite broadcasts its programs in 25 countries, including Argentina, Bahamas, Bolivia, Brazil, Canada, Chile, Colombia, Costa Rica, Czech Republic, Dominican, Cuba, Ecuador, United States, Guatemala, Guyana, Haiti, Honduras, Hong Kong, Jamaica, Mexico, Panama, Paraguay, Peru, Uruguay and Venezuela.

== Broadcast service in Asia ==
While seeking to introduce more prospects through the rest of the world, Presse Africaine currently broadcasts in 44 Asian countries for its television broadcasts. In Afghanistan, Saudi Arabia, Armenia, Azerbaijan, Bangladesh, Brunei, Burma, Cambodia, China, North Korea, South Korea, United Arab Emirates, Georgia, India, Indonesia, Iran, Iraq, Israel, Japan, Jordan, Kazakhstan, Kyrgyzstan, Kuwait, Laos, Lebanon, Malaysia, Maldives, Mongolia, Nepal, Oman, Palestine, Pakistan, Philippines, Qatar, Singapore, Sri Lanka, Syria, Tajikistan, Thailand, Turkmenistan, Turkey, Vietnam and Yemen.

== Broadcast service in Europe ==
For Europe, it is growing as it would amount to some 34 countries in 2016 against 8 in 2015, with nearly 10,000 viewers in Albania, Austria, Belarus, Belgium, Bosnia Herzegovina, Bulgaria, Croatia, Cyprus, Denmark, Estonia, Finland, France, Greece, Hungary, Iceland, Ireland, Italy, Latvia, Lithuania, Luxembourg, Macedonia, Malta, Moldova, Montenegro, Norway, Netherlands, Poland, Portugal, Romania, United Kingdom, Russia, Serbia, Slovakia, Slovenia, Sweden, Switzerland, Czech Republic and Ukraine.
