= Mayotte La Première =

- Country: Mayotte, France
- Network: La Première
- Headquarters: Mayotte

Programming
- Language: French
- Picture format: 576i SDTV

Ownership
- Owner: France Télévisions

History
- Launched: 21 December 1986; 39 years ago
- Former names: RFO Mayotte (1986–1988); RFO 1 Mayotte (1988–1999); Télé Mayotte (1999–2010); Mayotte 1^{re} (2010–2018)

Links
- Website: la1ere.francetvinfo.fr/mayotte/

Availability

Terrestrial
- TNT: Channel 1

Mayotte La Première (French pronunciation: [majɔt la pʁəmjɛʁ], lit. 'Mayotte the First'), is a French overseas departmental free-to-air television channel available in the department of Mayotte. It is operated by the overseas unit of France Télévisions.

== History ==
RFO Mayotte made its first broadcast on December 21, 1986, at 7pm, with a ceremony attended by Lucette Michaux-Chevry from Guadeloupe and French president of the time Jacques Chirac. The station's infrastructure started with three videotape machines, a transmitter and a relayer. After the ceremony, the mainland variety show Champs Elysées was broadcast. Live television news only started on April 10, 1989.

The audiovisual reform law no. 2004-669 of July 9, 2004 integrates the program company Réseau France Outre-mer into the public audiovisual group France Télévisions on which Télé Mayotte has since depended. Its president, Rémy Pflimlin, announces the change of name from Réseau France Outre-mer to Réseau Outre-Mer 1re to adapt to the launch of DTT in the French overseas regions. All of the network's television channels changed their name on November 30, 2010, when TNT started and Télé Nouvelle-Calédonie thus became Nouvelle-Calédonie 1re. The name change refers to the leading position of this channel in its broadcast territory as well as its first place on the remote control and its numbering in line with the other channels of the France Télévisions group.

The channel started HD broadcasts on satellite on January 15, 2020, as part of a pact for the conversion of the overseas operations to the technology, and later on terrestrial television on September 8, 2020.
