= Mass media in Jordan =

The Constitution of Jordan guarantees freedom of opinion and speech, in addition to freedom of the press and mass media, but all within the limits of the law. According to the U.S. Department of State, in practice there are significant restrictions in place curtailing the free operation of the media. Any criticism or defamation of the king or royal family is prohibited, as well as anything deemed to harm "the state’s reputation and dignity." The government has used tactics such as the threat of fines, prosecution, and detention to intimidate journalists and encourage self-censorship. Moreover, informants and censors at printing presses often give the government warning if a particularly inflammatory article is slated for publication, thereby allowing the government to apply pressure on the publisher to change or remove the item. King Abdullah issued a statement outlawing imprisonment of journalists, earning praise from human rights groups. Additionally, the Press and Publications Law and the Press Association Law impose certain limitations on the accreditation of journalists and the operation of newspapers; more damaging perhaps is the government’s unwillingness to advertise in newspapers not at least partially owned by the state. Jordanian radio and television are even more restricted in their freedoms than the press. Internet access in the kingdom is generally open and unrestricted, although there were past reports of government investigations into the sources of overly critical Internet sites.

Despite these restrictions, Jordan remains more open and tolerant than most of its Arab neighbors. The judiciary is the sole institution able to revoke licenses from domestic media organizations, and the government’s ability to shut down press outlets is limited. Additionally, court proceedings are open to the media unless the court itself rules otherwise. The law ensures the freedom and independence of foreign media organizations operating in Jordan, and international satellite television and regional television broadcasts are not restricted.

First radio service began in Jordan in 1948. The country had six AM, five FM, and one short-wave radio broadcast stations as of 1999, as well as a reported 20 television broadcast stations in 1995. A new radio and satellite station were scheduled to begin operations in June 2006 after two earlier delays. Jordanians had more than 1.6 million radio receivers in 1997 and 560,000 television receivers by 2000. Additionally, the country has six daily newspapers and 14 weeklies, as well as 270 other periodicals (with an average circulation of 148,000 in 1998).

== See also ==
- Television in Jordan
