= Radio Vlaanderen Internationaal =

Flemish international broadcaster

Coordinates: 50°51′10.79″N 4°24′15.4″E

Radio Vlaanderen Internationaal (Dutch for "Flanders International Radio"), was the international broadcasting service of Vlaamse Radio- en Televisieomroep (VRT), the public broadcaster of the Flemish community in Belgium.

RVi broadcast on cable FM and DAB in Flanders, mediumwave and satellite radio in Europe, and worldwide on shortwave. It was also available in North America FTA on AMC 4 satellite through the Home2US platform alongside BVN Netherlands.

Shortwave and other services ended on December 31, 2011. Domestic Flemish stations Radio 1 and Radio 2 will instead be broadcast worldwide via satellite, and all radio channels will also be available worldwide via the Internet.

RVI was previously known as Belgium Radio International and broadcast in various languages, including English.

== See also ==
- RTBF International external service of Belgian francophone radio
