= Parsifal bell =

String instrument with a bell-like sound

A Parsifal bell (German: Glockenklavier, 'bell piano') is a stringed musical instrument designed as a substitute for the church bells that are called for in the score of Richard Wagner's opera Parsifal.

The instrument was designed by Felix Mottl, a conductor of Wagner's works, and constructed by Schweisgut of Karlsruhe, Germany.

== Construction ==
It is constructed on the principle of the grand piano. A massive frame is shaped like a snooker table. The instrument has five notes; each note has six strings (three are tuned to the fundamental pitch, and three an octave higher). The strings are struck by large hammers, covered with cotton-wool, which the performer sets in motion by a strong elastic blow from their fist, similar to the motion of playing a carillon.

The hammers are attached to arms 22 inches (56 cm) long, which are screwed to a strong wooden span bridge placed horizontally above the strings at about two-fifths of the length from the front. On the point of the arm is the name of the note, and behind this the felt ledge struck by the fist. Two belly bridges and two wrest-plank bridges, one set for each octave, determine the vibrating length of the strings, and the belly bridge, as in other stringed instruments, is the medium through which the vibrations of the strings are communicated to the soundboard. The arrangement of pegs and wrest-pins is much the same as on the piano.

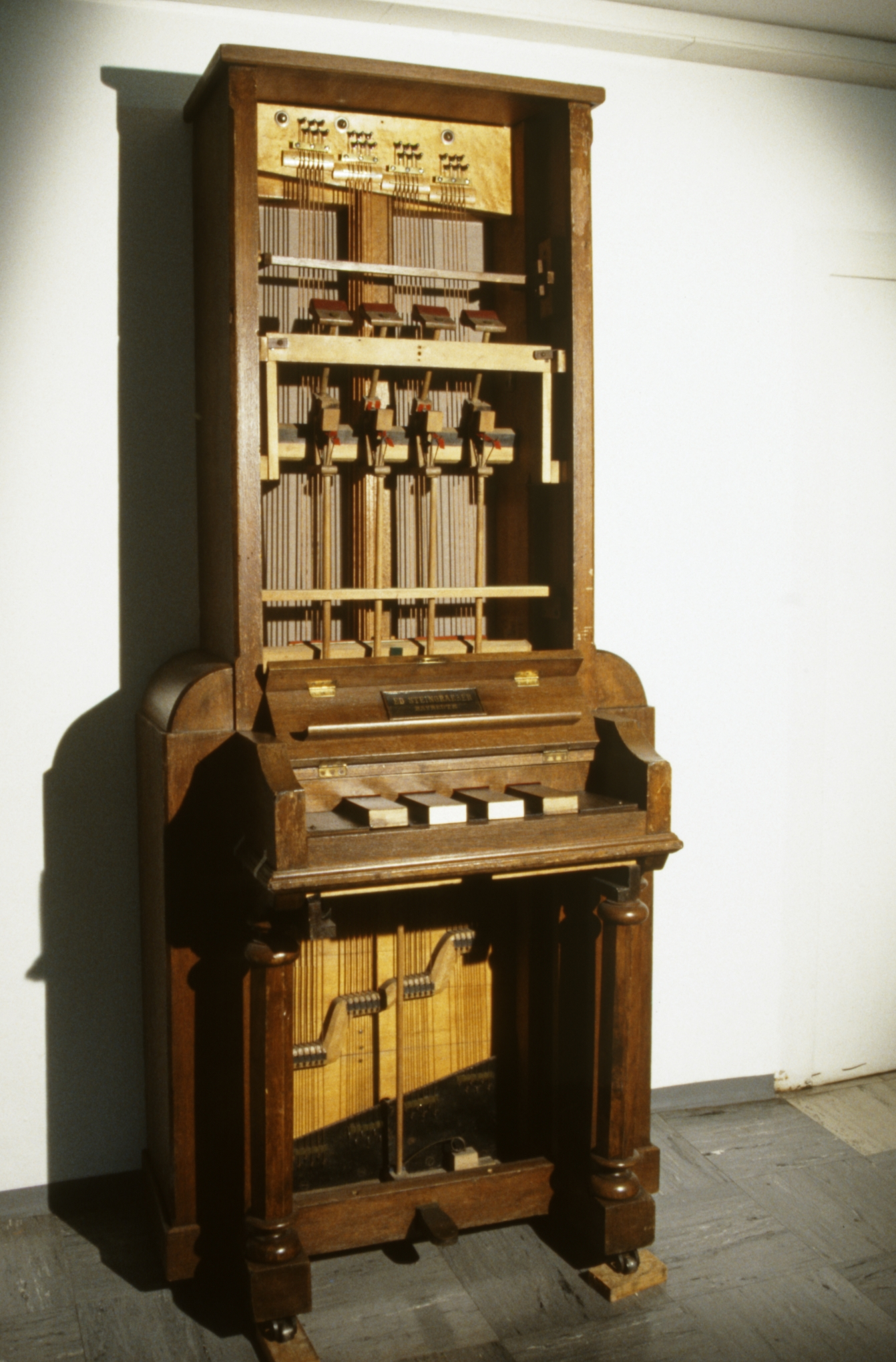
An 1881 model

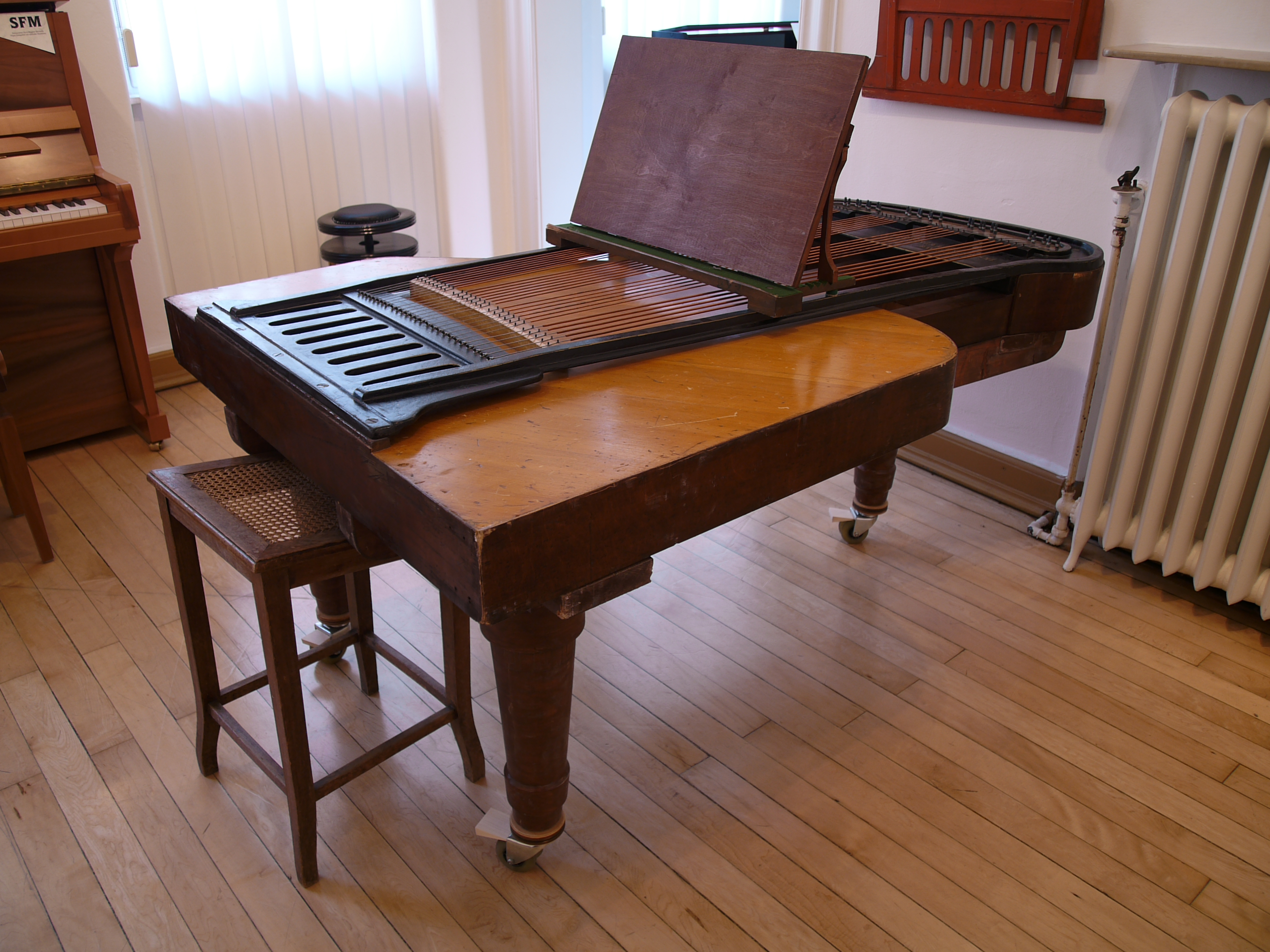
A 1912 model

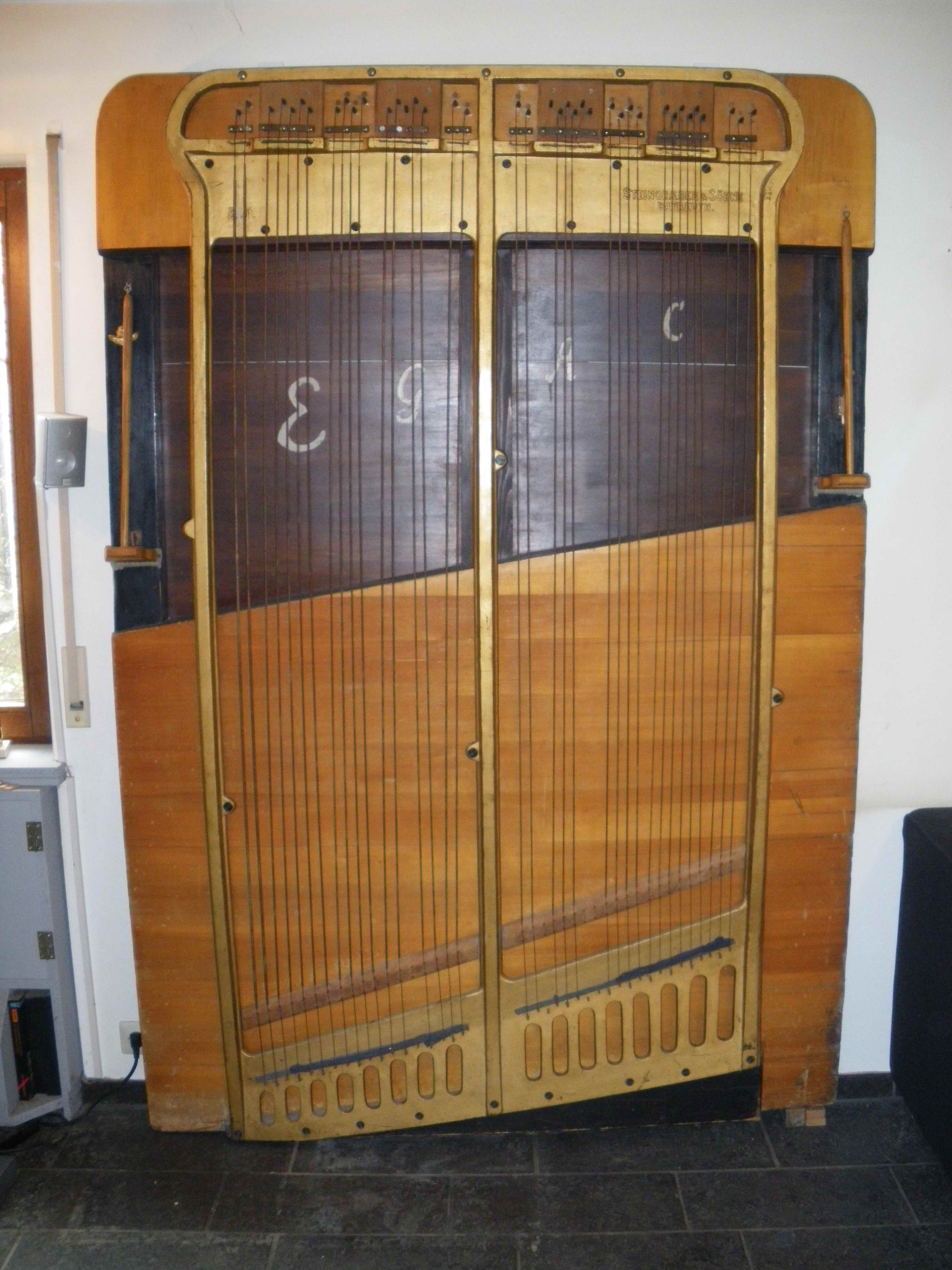
A 1927 model

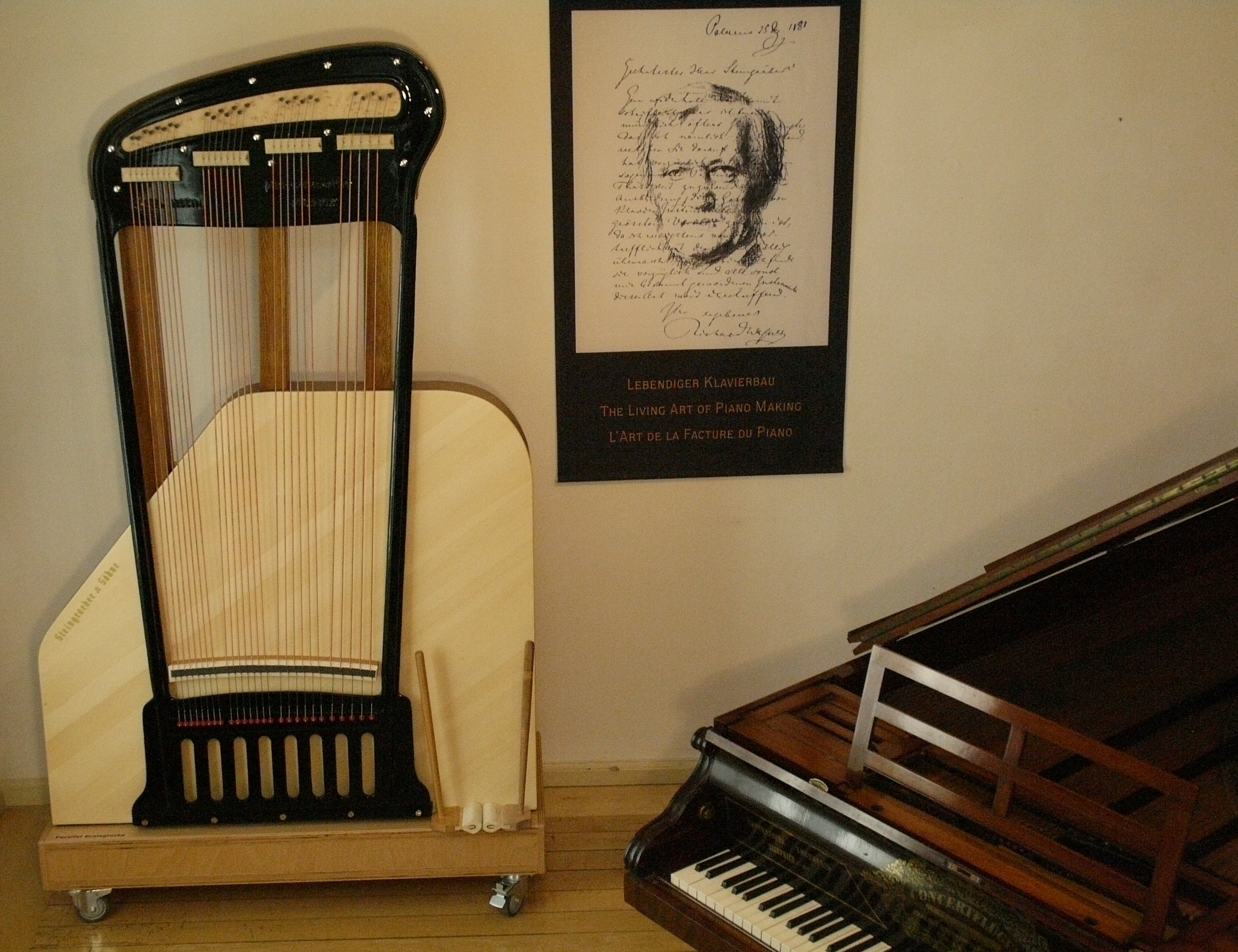
A 2015 model

== Need ==
Difficulties arise whenever a composer writes a piece for orchestra in which he calls for reproducing the effect of church bells. Well-known examples include the 1812 Overture, The Golden Legend, Cavalleria Rusticana, Pagliacci, Rienzi, and Parsifal. The most serious difficulty of all arose in Parsifal, where the bells are called for in an extremely solemn scene with deep religious significance. If real church bells were used for the notes Wagner wrote, they would overpower the orchestra and ruin the solemn atmosphere on the stage.

== Earlier Wagnerian church bell substitutes ==
Various substitutes for bells were tried in vain, but no other instrument gave a tone similar to that of church bells. This is because a bell sound consists of rich harmonics composing the clang, plus two distinct simultaneous notes, first the tap tone, which gives the pitch, and the hum tone or lower accompanying note. The dignity and beauty of the bell tone depend on the interval separating the hum from the tap tone.

A stringed instrument, similar to the Parsifal bell but having only four notes, was used at Bayreuth for the first performance of Parsifal in 1882, where it was combined with tam-tams or gongs in an attempt to replicate the sound of a church bell. The instrument was built by the Bayreuth-based pianoforte manufacturer Steingraeber & Söhne. After many trials the following combination was adopted as the best makeshift:

1. the stringed instrument with four keys;
2. four tam-tams or gongs tuned to the pitch of the four notes composing the chime;
3. a tuba, which plays the notes staccato in quavers to help make them more distinct;
4. a fifth tam-tam, on which a roll is executed with a drumstick.

== Modern church bell substitutes ==
In most orchestral music, tubular bells are used when a bell sound is called for. In another special case, a special peal of hemispherical bells was constructed for use in performances of Sir Arthur Sullivan's cantata, The Golden Legend. Struck with mallets, they produced both tap and hum tone. But Parsifal presented a particular problem because the lowest of the Golden Legend bells was a minor tenth higher than the lowest note required for Parsifal, and the aggregate weight of the four bells was thousands of pounds.

Modern productions of Parsifal typically use a synthesized, or electronically recorded, church bell sound.
