= Mass media in São Tomé and Príncipe =

Mass media in São Tomé and Príncipe includes telecommunications, television and radio.

== Television and radio ==
In 1997, there were about 38,000 radios and 23,000 television sets nationwide. Príncipe had the fewest TV sets, Ilhéu das Rolas was the last place without television. Broadcasts are in Portuguese with some broadcasts in Forro Creole. There are no broadcasts in Ngola (Angolar Creole) or Lunguyê (Príncipense creole).

There are a few television stations, the oldest being the public channel TVS, which had been the only national station for many years. The nation has recently received TV CPLP and some of its programs are broadcast, the network first aired in 2016.

Nationwide radio stations include RNSTP (Sao Tome and Principe National Radio) and RDP África. Príncipe also has its own radio station.

== Internet ==
Its search provider is Google STP, which had recently been added. There are no other providers in the nation, not even their own.

== Print ==
Three newspapers are privately owned, while one is state-run. The most popular paper is Téla Nón which is a daily written in Portuguese with a few articles written in Forro Creole (may be the only paper). In its early years, it has mainly been the nation's only newspaper, there are about 3 newspapers today. Nothing is written in the two other creole languages, Angolar Creole and Principense Creole.

== See also ==
- Telecommunications in São Tomé and Príncipe
- Literature of São Tomé and Príncipe

== Bibliography ==
- "São Tomé and Príncipe: Directory". Africa South of the Sahara 2004. Regional Surveys of the World. Europa Publications. 2004. ISBN 1857431839. (Includes information about newspapers, radio, etc.)
