= Radio Baghdad =

Radio Baghdad may refer to:

- Media in Iraq, where radio stations use the expression
- "Radio Baghdad", a 2004 song by Patti Smith from Trampin'
- "Extraordinary Girl", originally "Radio Baghdad", a 2004 song by Green Day from American Idiot
