= IRIB World Service =

International broadcasting station of Iran

- Type: Radio network
- Country: Iran
- Availability: International
- Owner: Islamic Republic of Iran Broadcasting
- Launch date: 1956
- Official website: parstoday.ir/en

IRIB World Service, also known as Voice of Islamic Republic of Iran and Pars Today, is the official international broadcasting radio network of Iran.

The radio network started to work in 1956 with the aim of familiarizing different world nations with Iran's history and culture as well as its different regions and historical sites. Following the Iranian Revolution, elaborating on the revolution's stances and the ideals of the Islamic Republic system were put high on the radio's agenda.

The radio's schedule includes news and talk programmes, political and religious commentaries, different series and features on special occasions.

== Languages ==
The IRIB World Service currently broadcasts in 32 languages:

- Albanian
- Arabic
- Armenian
- Assyrian
- Azerbaijani
- Bengali
- Bosnian
- Chinese
- Dari
- English
- French
- Georgian
- German
- Hausa
- Hebrew
- Hindi
- Indonesian
- Italian
- Japanese
- Kazakh
- Kurdish
- Pashto
- Persian
- Russian
- Spanish
- Swahili
- Tajik
- Talysh
- Turkish
- Turkmen
- Urdu
- Uzbek

=== English Radio ===
English Radio is the English language output of the IRIB World Service, aimed to the listeners in the English-speaking world. Voice of Justice is a 60-minute-long programming block, aimed to listeners in the United States.

== See also ==
- Islamic Republic of Iran Broadcasting, the Iranian publicly funded broadcaster.
