= Thai Global Network =

Satellite channel from Thailand

TGN
- Country: Thailand
- Broadcast area: Worldwide

Programming
- Languages: Thai, English
- Picture format: 480i (For the Americas and Japan) 576i (Standard)

Ownership
- Owner: Royal Thai Army Radio and Television Channel 5

History
- Launched: 1 January 1998; 28 years ago
- Closed: 10 January 2023; 3 years ago

Links
- Website: Thai TV Global

Thai TV Global Network (TGN) is a former Thai satellite television channel. Thai TV Global Network is the first and only satellite TV broadcasting center in Thailand. TGN, under the operation of the Royal Thai Army Radio and Television Channel 5, provides 24-hour-programs broadcasting to 170 countries on five continents. All facets of Thai life, culture, activities, information, news and entertainment are included in the programming for the channel.

TGN reaches an audience of 350 million viewers around the world.

Programming on the channel includes game shows, reports about the royal house of the Chakri dynasty, news, Thai music videos, soap operas, cooking shows (some in English), and Thai boxing known as Muay Thai.

== Reception ==
Thailand

- Satellite reception via Thaicom 5
  - C-band and Ku-band
- Cable operators in Thailand

UBC channel 179 ** 500 ** cable operators as a member of the Thailand Cable TV Association Independent cable networks **

Worldwide

- Satellite (DVB-S)
  - Hotbird 13 degrees East 10 815 H (Europe)
- Various cable operators in some countries (DVB-C)
- Internet http://app.tv5.co.th/

also available on Galaxy 19 at 97 west

== History ==
The pay TV station Thai Wave started via satellite in 1996. At the beginning, the station featured Thai video clips from Thailand, as well as news and soap operas. The station broadcast daily from 8 pm to 4 am. The program was promoted in Europe by THAI WAVE International Broadcasting Co. Ltd., Hauptstr. 100, 76461 Muggensturm, Germany. The use of Thai Wave analogue Decoding from this period was same as Premiere and Canal +, special was the "white key" that had to be used in decoders to decode the program. After about a year, Thai Wave ended operation due to the low demand. The home of the station was in Phaya Thai, a Khet (district) of Bangkok and it was used the studio and program content from Royal Thai Army Radio and Television Channel 5. Later Thai TV Global Network started operation by digital satellite broadcasting.

- Eutelsat II-F3 16 degrees east - Thai Wave (encrypted / encoded, sometimes "clear window") Entertainment thai 11 163 H 20 6.65 PAL (analog)

On 15 November 2022, TV 5 announced the planned termination of Thai TV Global Network, with transmissions ceasing from 10 January 2023.
