= Rai Italia Radio =

International broadcast service of Italy

Rai Internazionale Radio
- Country: Italy

Ownership
- Owner: RAI, through Rai Internazionale
- Key people: Maurizio Imbriale (Head of the Rai International Internet project)

History
- Launch date: July 1, 1930
- Closed: December 31, 2011
- Former names: Rai Italia Radio; Rai International Radio; Rai Satelradio; Raitalia Radio

Coverage
- Availability: International

Links
- Website: www.internazionale.rai.it

Rai Internazionale Radio, formerly known as Rai Italia Radio, Rai International Radio, Rai Satelradio and Raitalia Radio, was the official international broadcast radio service of Rai Internazionale, a subsidiary owned by RAI, Italy's public broadcaster.

== History ==
Rai Internazionale Radio has been broadcasting from Rome to the rest of the world for the past 72 years under various names.

In the 1930s Italy was one of the first countries to begin international shortwave broadcasts. Guglielmo Marconi, the man who invented radio, oversaw the construction of the first short-wave transmitter at Prato Smeraldo outside Rome on July 1, 1930. Four years later two more transmitters were completed and broadcasts began in English and Italian to North America. In 1935 broadcasting of programmes in Italian, Portuguese and Spanish began to South America.

In 1939, after the completion of six new transmitters, programmes in English were beamed to the Far East, Europe and countries around the Mediterranean. It is from the short-wave radio centre at Rome-Prato Smeraldo that all Rai International's programmes are broadcast.

During the Second World War political and strategic motives were added to the original aim of linking Italy with the vast community of Italian migrants around the world. These new motives included international broadcasting common to all the Great Powers, beginning with the former colonial nations: France, Germany, Great Britain, the Netherlands, the Soviet Union and the United States. After Italy entered the war short-wave broadcasts were suspended following the armistice signed with the Allies on September 8, 1943, and were only resumed on September 3, 1946, with the broadcast of news bulletins in English, Italian, French, Portuguese and Spanish.

A 1962 law allocated management of international short-wave broadcasts, for which a special committee of the Cabinet Office is responsible, to state broadcaster Rai. As the years went by the programmes lost their character of official - sometimes even propaganda - broadcasts to become a news source that fully reflects the democratic nature of the Italian Republic. Up to the last broadcast, Radio Roma offered a comprehensive news service on Italian politics, society and culture, not least within the context of the European Union.

In 1975 the setting up of a special management section for foreign broadcasting and journalism laid the foundations for significant development of the sector. Subsequently the existing services for foreign broadcasting were expanded to include Rai International's new intercontinental television channels. In the near future Rai International is destined to be transformed into an autonomous company within state broadcaster Rai.

== Last broadcasts ==
Each day Rai Internazionale's editorial team turned out ten editions of "Italia chiama Italia News" in Italian: this 25-minute news programme was designed for Italian listeners throughout the world.

The editorial team also produced Racconto Italiano, Taccuino Italiano, Tutto di Prima and Storia e Storie.

In many countries it was possible to receive several Rai Internazionale programmes or the entire programme schedule of Rai Internazionale through local radio stations that re-transmit the signal in their own zone, on AM, FM, short wave or via cable.

On October 1, 2007, all broadcasts on short wave were discontinued and foreign language services were closed. On December 31, 2011 Rai Internazionale Radio closed down its operations.

English news items were transmitted as part of "Notturno Italiano" programme on medium wave until December 31, 2011.

== Rai Internazionale Radio ==
Rai Internazionale Radio transmitted its channel online and on satellite, 24 hours a day. Thus the radio and news programmes produced by RAI were available worldwide without any special technical devices (apart from a computer and Internet connection).

Rai Internazionale Radio has broadcast the best of Rai International Radio and the three Radio Rai networks daily, 24 hours a day. This included music, information and entertainment programmes until it closed down on December 31, 2011.

== See also ==
- Rai, Italy's publicly funded national broadcaster
- Rai Italia, international television service run by Italy's national broadcaster
