= Radio Bulgaria =

International radio broadcaster of Bulgaria

Radio Bǎlgarija (BNR) Radio Bulgaria (BNR)
- Type: Radio network
- Country: Bulgaria

Ownership
- Owner: Bulgarian National Radio
- Key people: Angel Nedyalkov (Director)

History
- Launch date: 1936

Coverage
- Availability: International

Links
- Website: https://www.bnr.bg/en

Radio Bulgaria (Bulgarian: Радио България, Radio Bǎlgarija; BNR) is the official international broadcasting station of Bulgaria.

== History ==
For almost seventy years the world service of the Bulgarian radio, formerly called Radio Sofia but now renamed Radio Bulgaria, has been presenting the country's cultural and national identity to the world. It is a principal source of information from and about Bulgaria for millions of listeners outside its borders.

== Current broadcasting ==
Radio Bulgaria ended its shortwave service on 1 February 2012, closed its Arabic language section in 2016, and suspended its 24-hour online audio streaming in Bulgarian, English, Spanish, German, French, Russian, Serbian, Greek, Turkish, and Albanian in 2017.

On 10 June 2021, Radio Bulgaria launched a new podcast called Bulgaria Today. It is released every day in English, German, French, Spanish, Russian, Serbian, Greek, Albanian, and Turkish. The new program features news stories from Bulgaria and internationally, as well as segments about Bulgarian culture and tourism.

== See also ==
- Eastern Bloc information dissemination
- List of international radio broadcasters
