= Voice of Mongolia =

International broadcasting station of Mongolia

Coordinates: 47°55′00″N 107°00′00″E

Programming
- Languages: Mongolian, English, Chinese, Russian, Japanese

Ownership
- Owner: Mongolian National Broadcaster

History
- First air date: October 1964

Links
- Website: vom.mn

Voice of Mongolia is the official international broadcasting station of Mongolia.

The Voice Of Mongolia is the country's only overseas broadcasting service and is operated by Mongolian National Broadcaster, a pioneer sole public service broadcaster. Short-wave international broadcasting in Mongolia dates back over 60 years. The first broadcast in October, 1964 was a half hour transmission in Mongolian and Chinese, beamed to China. In the next few years, Mongolian international broadcasting expanded in terms of languages used, broadcast hours and target areas. The English service of Radio Ulaanbaatar, which was renamed The Voice Of Mongolia on January 1, 1997, was launched on January 29, 1965. Today the output of The Voice Of Mongolia consists of various programmes designed to provide information about Mongolia and the Mongolians, their history, traditions and culture. It broadcasts a total of 8 hours a day in 5 languages: Mongolian, English, Chinese, Russian and Japanese.

== Current broadcasts ==
All of the Voice Of Mongolia's broadcasts come directly from its Khonkhor Transmitting Station, about 25 km east of Ulan Bator, Mongolia's capital. It broadcasts through Soviet-made 100, 250, and 500 kW transmitters and curtain antennas built in the mid sixties. The transmissions beamed to East Asia provide fair reception in South America, and the South Asian transmissions can be heard in Southern Africa and in Europe as well. However, this reception is influenced by propagation conditions and frequency congestion.

In the 2010s, the Japanese service of VOM had the most listeners, the largest contributor of feedback to the service came from Japan.

== See also ==
- Mongolian National Broadcaster, the Mongolian publicly funded radio and television broadcaster
