= Radio Thailand World Service =

International broadcasting service of Thailand

- Type: Radio network
- Country: Thailand
- Availability: International
- Owner: National Broadcasting Services of Thailand
- Launch date: 20 October 1938
- Official website: Radio Thailand World Service website

Radio Thailand World Service is the official international broadcasting station of Thailand. It began foreign-language broadcasting on 20 October 1938 under callsign HSK-9. Owned by the National Broadcasting Services of Thailand, the station broadcasts in 10 languages: Thai, English, Chinese, Burmese, Lao, Khmer, Malay, German, Japanese and Vietnamese. RTWS is broadcast on the shortwave band using the relay transmitter tower of Voice of America in Ban Dung District, Udon Thani.
