= Radio Poland =

External service of the Polish public broadcaster

- Type: international broadcasting
- Country: Poland

Ownership
- Owner: Polskie Radio
- Key people: Danuta Isler (English Service Editor)

History
- Launch date: 1936; 90 years ago
- Former names: Radio Polonia, PR5

Coverage
- Availability: Global

Links
- Webcast: Live Stream
- Website: http://external.polskieradio.pl/ English language website http://thenews.pl

Radio Poland (until January 2007 as Radio Polonia, later "Polish Radio External Service" (Polish: Polskie Radio dla Zagranicy, in Polish legislation also named as Polskie Radio Program V)) is the official international broadcasting station of the Republic of Poland and is a part of Poland's public radio network, Polish Radio.

Its aim is to broadcast programs on developments in Poland, Polish foreign policy, the economy, business and foreign investments. Polish Radio External Service provides objective and impartial information about Poland and its stance on international affairs. It shows Polish society, its daily life as well as scientific and cultural achievements.

Polish Radio External Service ended their English language shortwave broadcasts in 2012 and announced that they would be ceasing all shortwave transmissions on 27 October 2013, from which point they will only be broadcasting over the internet and through partnerships such as the World Radio Network.

== History ==
- 1936 – Polish Radio launches shortwave broadcasts of brief programmes in English and Polish
- 1945 – after the end of World War II, the shortwave channel Warszawa III resumes external broadcasts
- 1959 – Polish Radio starts broadcasting in Esperanto
- 1990 – Polish Radio starts broadcasting for Ukraine, Belarus, Lithuania, Latvia and Estonia
- 2000 – Radio Polonia begins daily Real Audio broadcasts in several languages via the World Radio Network
- 2007 – Radio Polonia changes name to Polish Radio External Service
- 2011 – Cessation of its Esperanto service, which had lost its editorial team the previous year.
- 2012 – English language shortwave transmissions end.
- 2013 – Remaining shortwave services close on 27 October.
- 2014 – Polish Radio External Service changes name to Radio Poland

== Programmes ==
Radio Poland broadcasts in six languages: Polish, English, German, Russian, Ukrainian and Belarusian (with various amount of programming, for example English is available 24 hours a day while German 90 minutes a day). Until 2014, there was a Hebrew language programming, Kol Polin, which included a weekly Yiddish-language broadcast called Naye Khvalyes ("New Waves").

Shortwave transmissions were reduced between 2007 and 2012 and by 2013 PRES was broadcasting two times a day with programmes in Polish, Belarusian and Russian. On 27 October 2013, all shortwave transmissions ceased and PRES became an online only entity.

Radio Poland's programming include news bulletins and analysis, press reviews, correspondent's dispatches, interviews, discussions and features. The English service broadcast programming with more variety; including quizzes, chart shows and historical programming.

== Listen ==
Listeners in Europe can tune in via satellite on Eutelsat 13 E, 10892 MHz, FEC 3/4, SR 27500, Horizontal, PID audio 0119

Polish Radio External Service can be heard in English on the World Radio Network (WRN) through terrestrial relays, on cable and via satellite.

On cable: PR ES in English is also available to 4.5 million homes on cable in London, Dublin, Berlin, Amsterdam, Brussels, Vienna, Strassburg, Geneva, Tokyo, Washington, D.C., and many other cities. It can also be heard on hotel cable in the Netherlands and Hong Kong.

=== Internet ===
Schedule: https://www.polskieradio.pl/ramowka/antena/5

- "Polskie Radio dla Zagranicy Zachód" (English and German)
  - 48 kbit/s aac+:

http://player.polskieradio.pl/-5
https://player.polskieradio.pl/anteny/poland
https://stream85.polskieradio.pl/pr5/pr5.sdp/playlist.m3u8
https://stream85.polskieradio.pl/pr5/pr5.sdp/manifest.mpd
rtmps://stream85.polskieradio.pl:443/pr5/pr5.sdp
rtsps://stream85.polskieradio.pl:443/pr5/pr5.sdp
http://mp3.polskieradio.pl:8958
http://stream3.polskieradio.pl:8958

  - 96 kbit/s mp3:

http://mp3.polskieradio.pl:8908
http://stream3.polskieradio.pl:8908
http://mp3.polskieradio.pl:8804/pr5_mp3
http://stream3.polskieradio.pl:8804/pr5_mp3

- "Polskie Radio dla Zagranicy Wschód" (Belarusian, Polish, Russian and Ukrainian. Also on English and German for 1386 AM)
  - 48 kbit/s aac+:

http://player.polskieradio.pl/-16
https://player.polskieradio.pl/anteny/polsza
https://stream85.polskieradio.pl/pr5/pr5_wsch.sdp/playlist.m3u8
https://stream85.polskieradio.pl/pr5/pr5_wsch.sdp/manifest.mpd
rtmps://stream85.polskieradio.pl:443/pr5/pr5_wsch.sdp
rtsps://stream85.polskieradio.pl:443/pr5/pr5_wsch.sdp
http://mp3.polskieradio.pl:8964
http://stream3.polskieradio.pl:8964

  - 96 kbit/s mp3:

http://mp3.polskieradio.pl:8914
http://stream3.polskieradio.pl:8914
http://mp3.polskieradio.pl:8804/pr5_wsch_mp3
http://stream3.polskieradio.pl:8804/pr5_wsch_mp3

- "Radio Poland DAB+" (Belarusian, English, German, Polish, Russian, Ukrainian)
  - 48 kbit/s aac+:

http://player.polskieradio.pl/-13
https://player.polskieradio.pl/anteny/externaldab
https://open.fm/stacje-radiowe/polskie-radio-dla-zagranicy
https://stream85.polskieradio.pl/pr5/pr5_dab.sdp/playlist.m3u8
https://stream85.polskieradio.pl/pr5/pr5_dab.sdp/manifest.mpd
rtmps://stream85.polskieradio.pl:443/pr5/pr5_dab.sdp
rtsps://stream85.polskieradio.pl:443/pr5/pr5_dab.sdp

  - 96 kbit/s mp3:

http://mp3.polskieradio.pl:8912
http://stream3.polskieradio.pl:8912
http://mp3.polskieradio.pl:8804/pr5_dab_mp3
http://stream3.polskieradio.pl:8804/pr5_dab_mp3

- "Polskie Radio dla Ukrainy" (Ukrainian)
  - 256 kbit/s aac:

https://player.polskieradio.pl/anteny/ukraina
https://open.fm/stacje-radiowe/polskie-radio-dla-ukrainy
https://stream85.polskieradio.pl/radio_ukraina/ukraina.stream/playlist.m3u8
https://stream85.polskieradio.pl/radio_ukraina/ukraina.stream/manifest.mpd
rtmps://stream85.polskieradio.pl:443/radio_ukraina/ukraina.stream
rtsps://stream85.polskieradio.pl:443/radio_ukraina/ukraina.stream

=== Satellite relays ===
Hot Bird 13°E, 12.188 MHz, Vertical

=== Terrestrial relays ===
==== Europe ====
- Radio Baltic Waves (1386 AM, Viešintos, Utena County, Lithuania, 75 kW)
  - 4:00-5:00 UTC in Belarusian
  - 5:00-5:30 UTC in Ukrainian
  - 13:00-14:00 UTC in English
  - 15:30-16:00 UTC in German
  - 16:00-16:30 UTC in Russian
  - 16:30-17:00 UTC in Polish
- Poland
  - Radio Poland DAB+ (MUX-R3 DAB+) (all language services)
  - Polish Radio for Ukraine (MUX-R3 DAB+) (in Ukrainian)
- Lithuania
  - Radio znad Wilii (103.8 FM, Vilnius)
    - in Polish at 18:30-19:00 and 23:00-23:30 local time
    - in Belarusian at 5:00-6:00, 23:30-0:00 local time
- Belarus
  - see to Poland (DAB+) and Lithuania (FM)
- Ukraine
  - Hromadske radio (FM-network) (in Ukrainian at 7:00-7:30 local time)
  - Radio Nezalezhnist (106.7 FM, Lviv) (in Polish at 18:30-19:00 local time)
  - local radio stations in FM (in Ukrainian)

==== North America ====
In English:

- USA: NY Radio Rampa 620 AM
- USA: Rhinelander (Wisconsin) WXPR 97,1 FM
- USA: Spokane (Washington) KSFC 91,9 FM
- USA: Monroe University of Louisiana KEDM 90,3 FM

In Polish:

- USA: Chicago Polskie Radio 1300 AM
- Canada: Calgary – Międzynarodowe Radio Fairchild 94,7 FM
- Canada: Vancouver – Międzynarodowe Radio Fairchild 1470 AM
- Canada: Vancouver – Międzynarodowe Radio Fairchild 96,1 FM
- Canada: Toronto – Międzynarodowe Radio Fairchild 1430 AM
- Canada: Toronto – Radio Polonia 100,7 FM

== See also ==
- Polskie Radio, the Polish publicly funded radio broadcaster
- Eastern Bloc information dissemination
