= International Radio of Serbia =

International broadcasting service of Serbia

- Type: Radio network
- Country: Serbia

Ownership
- Owner: Radio Television of Serbia

History
- Launch date: March 8, 1936; 89 years ago
- Closed: July 31, 2015; 10 years ago
- Former names: Free Yugoslavia, Radio Yugoslavia

Coverage
- Availability: International

The International Radio of Serbia (Serbian: Међународни радио Србија), formerly Radio Yugoslavia, was the official international broadcasting station of Serbia.

International Radio of Serbia used to broadcast to all parts of the world, in twelve languages: English, French, German, Russian, Spanish, Arabic, Albanian, Greek, Italian, Hungarian, Chinese and Serbian.

According to reports, the service closed on July 31, 2015, after 79 years of broadcasting.

== History ==
Broadcasting of the programmes for foreign countries from this region started on March 8, 1936, in the Kingdom of Yugoslavia. An immediate reason for the establishment of a shortwave radio service was the need to confront fascist propaganda. In November, 1941, during the occupation of Belgrade in the Second World War, a Free Yugoslavia radio station started its work and it broadcast programmes until 1945, from the city of Ufa on the Ural River (Russia). From 1945, the broadcasts intended for foreign listeners throughout the world were broadcast within the scope of Radio Belgrade. Radio Yugoslavia was established by a resolution of the Federative People's Republic of Yugoslavia, and was working within that status until January, 1954, when Radio Belgrade took over broadcasting programmes for foreign listeners again. A Decree on the establishment of the informative working organization of Radio Yugoslavia was rendered on January 26, 1977, and the radio started broadcasting on February 2, 1978, as a separate institution.

From 1951, foreign programmes for the world have been broadcast through the Stubline Transmission Centre (located in the vicinity of Belgrade). Broadcasts are also made from a newer centre located near Bijeljina in the Republika Srpska which was completed in 1987. In 1992, due to war operations in the territory of Bosnia and Herzegovina, two transmitters were moved from the Bijeljina centre to the shortwave centre in Stubline. During the 1999 NATO bombing of the Federal Republic of Yugoslavia, the main building of the Stubline transmission centre was destroyed, along with all transmitters.

== Current broadcasts ==
The International Radio of Serbia obtained their Internet web site in March, 1997. The radio station web site offers the possibility of daily listening to programmes in six languages: Serbian, English, French, German, Russian, Spanish. Also follow-up publications, in writing, are made in thirteen languages: Serbian, English, French, German, Russian, Spanish, Arabic, Albanian, Greek, Bulgarian, Italian, Hungarian, Chinese.

Beside the programmes intended for foreign listeners abroad the International Radio of Serbia has, since 1991, been broadcasting a local program at JU RADIO, on 100.4 MHz.

The station maintains regular contacts with listeners from the country and from abroad. Several thousands of letters are received annually from all over the world. About 190 staff-members take part in the making of programmes.

== See also ==
- Radio Television of Serbia, the Serbian publicly funded radio television broadcaster
