= Voice of Turkey =

International broadcasting service of Turkey

- Turkey

Ownership
- Owner: Turkish Radio and Television Corporation

History
- First air date: 1937

Links
- Website: www.trt.net.tr/english#homepage

The Voice of Türkiye (short VOT; until 2022 Voice of Turkey; Turkish: Türkiye'nin Sesi Radyosu, TSR) is the international radio service of Turkish state broadcaster TRT on the internet, Turksat 3A satellite and shortwave. All shortwave broadcasts are transmitted from a single site near Emirler, Ankara Province (39.4016°N 32.8558°E).

The interval signal of Voice of Turkey received in the UK on 15450 kHz in May 2013.

It is broadcast 24 hours a day in 35 languages, targeting both people of Turkish origin (TSR) and foreigners (VOT). Its schedule mainly includes news, music, educational and cultural programmes.

Its transmissions used to start with a piano tune in the hicaz makam. Since 2015, a different melody has been played before the start of the broadcast, namely the piece "Elif Dedim be Dedim" in an instrumental version.

== Logos ==
TRT VOT World

TRT VOT West

TRT VOT East

== Foreign languages ==
UTC	VOT World	VOT West	VOT East
03:00	English	Georgian	Hungarian
03:30	English	Armenian	Bosnian/Cro- atian/Serbian
04:00	music	Russian	Bosnian/Cro- atian/Serbian
04:30	music	Russian	Dari; Pashto; Afghan Uzbek
05:00	Hausa	Persian	Dari; Pashto; Afghan Uzbek
05:30	Hausa	Persian	Dari; Pashto; Afghan Uzbek
06:00	Swahili	Albanian	Portuguese
06:30	Swahili	Albanian	Portuguese
07:00	German	music	Azerbaijani
07:30	German	music	Azerbaijani
08:00	Turkmen	Macedonian	Georgian
08:30	Italian	Armenian	Persian
09:00	Arabic	Romanian	Persian
09:30	Arabic	Kyrgyz	Persian
10:00	French	Uyghur	Tatar
10:30	French	Uyghur	Uzbek
11:00	Bulgarian	Hungarian	Chinese
11:30	German	Bosnian/Cro- atian/Serbian	Chinese
12:00	German	Bosnian/Cro- atian/Serbian	Urdu
12:30	English	Albanian	Urdu
13:00	English	Albanian	Russian
13:30	Kazakh	Bosnian/Cro- atian/Serbian	Russian
14:00	Arabic	Greek	Spanish
14:30	Arabic	Greek	Spanish

UTC	VOT World	VOT West	VOT East
15:00	Persian	Armenian	Dari; Pashto; Afghan Uzbek
15:30	Persian	Azerbaijani	Dari; Pashto; Afghan Uzbek
16:00	Bulgarian	Azerbaijani	Dari; Pashto; Afghan Uzbek
16:30	Spanish	Tatar	English
17:00	Spanish	Hausa	English
17:30	German	Hausa	French
18:00	German	Arabic	French
18:30	English	Arabic	Russian
19:00	English	Portuguese	Russian
19:30	French	Portuguese	Swahili
20:00	French	Spanish	Swahili
20:30	English	Spanish	music
21:00	English	Bosnian/Cro- atian/Serbian	music
21:30	Italian	Greek	Macedonian
22:00	English	Greek	Russian
22:30	English	Arabic	Russian
23:00	German	Arabic	Chinese
23:30	German	Urdu	Chinese
00:00	Portuguese	Urdu	Azerbaijani
00:30	Portuguese	Romanian	Azerbaijani
01:00	Spanish	music	Turkmen
01:00	Spanish	music	Kazakh
02:00	Uyghur	French	Kyrgyz
02:30	Uyghur	French	Uzbek
* Summer 2024 schedule * Italic: also on shortwave * In winter broadcasts are one hour later (01:00 UTC becomes 02:00 UTC etc.).

== See also ==
- Turkish Radio and Television Corporation (TRT)
- TRT World, TRT Arabi
- List of international radio broadcasters
