= RTBF International =

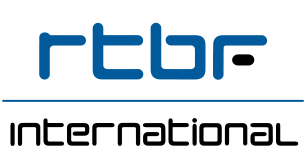
- Belgium
- Broadcast area: Europe, Central Africa

Ownership
- Owner: RTBF

History
- First air date: 1 April 2004
- Last air date: July 2019

Links
- Website: www.rtbfi.be

RTBF International was the Belgian (Wallonia and Brussels) international radio station owned by RTBF, available in Europe and Central Africa via satellite and online.

== History ==
On 26 June 2006, RTBF International began broadcasting in FM in Kinshasa on 99.2 MHz.

RTBF ceased its shortwave service on 31 December 2009. Around July 2019, the radio station seemed to have ceased operations. In Belgium though DAB+ and internet RTBF Mix has been launched for the north of the country.

Although RTBF ceased its international service, it continues broadcasting from the Wavre transmitter on 621 kHz, everyday from 05:00–23:00, in AM with La Première broadcasting from 05:00–19:00, 23:00–00:00 (Monday to Friday), 06:00–14:00 (Weekends), and VivaCité broadcasting the rest of the time. It has been announced that this Medium Wave service shall cease before the end of 2018.

== See also ==
- RTBF
- La Première
- VivaCité
