= WNYJ-TV =

Television station in West Milford, New Jersey (1996–2017)

- West Milford–Newark, New Jersey; New York, New York; United States
- City: West Milford, New Jersey
- Channels: Digital: 29 (UHF); Virtual: 66
- Branding: WNYJ Worldview

Programming
- Affiliations: see § Subchannels

Ownership
- Owner: Family Stations; (FSINJ License Co, LLC)
- Sister stations: WFME; WFME-FM

History
- Founded: March 30, 1987
- First air date: March 1, 1996
- Last air date: October 25, 2017
- Former call signs: WFME-TV (1996–2013)
- Former channel numbers: Analog: 66 (UHF, 1996–2009)
- Former affiliations: Non-commercial religious independent (1996–2013); MHz Worldview (2013–2017); Blue Ocean Network (February–September 2014); France 24 (2014–2015); CNC World (2014–2017)
- Call sign meaning: New York/New Jersey

Technical information
- Licensing authority: FCC
- Facility ID: 20818
- ERP: 200 kW
- HAAT: 167 m (548 ft)
- Transmitter coordinates: 40°47′17.5″N 74°15′18.2″W

Links
- Public license information: Public file; LMS

WNYJ-TV (channel 66) was an independent non-commercial television station licensed to West Milford, New Jersey, United States. The station's transmitter was located in West Orange, New Jersey. Its broadcast license was owned by the Oakland, California–based Christian broadcast ministry Family Stations, who from 1996 through 2013 operated it as WFME-TV, a religious television station.

WNYJ-TV carried programming from CNC World, an English-language news channel based in Beijing, on its main channel, 66.1. On WNYJ's digital subchannel 66.2 it aired MHz WorldView, a non-commercial television network owned by Virginia-based Commonwealth Public Broadcasting Corporation. An additional subchannel carried the audio from WFME-FM in Mount Kisco, New York, which broadcasts the Family Radio religious network. One WNYJ subchannel had carried France 24, an English-language news channel from Paris, although that service was discontinued by the station.

In April 2017, it was announced that WNYJ had sold its spectrum in the Federal Communications Commission's (FCC) incentive auction and would be going off the air. WNYJ-TV ceased operations October 25, 2017.

== History ==
=== Channel 66 as a translator ===
The channel 66 allocation in the New York City area originally began operation in 1970 as W66AA, which served as a repeater for WABC-TV (channel 7). Originally, most of the upper UHF band stations were used as a compromise to work around the "reflection" problem brought about by the then-new World Trade Center. The issue was that TV signals transmitted from the Empire State Building (about three miles north of the WTC) would bounce off the WTC skins, leading to viewers on that north/south direction getting excessive ghosting.

The use of UHF translators and repeaters that were mounted on the WTC with a northward transmission pattern allowed viewers in that zone the option of tuning in to the new, and clearer, signal.

Most of the TV stations moved their primary transmitters to the WTC's North Tower in 1975, thus leaving channel 66 at the Empire State Building as a backup.

WABC-TV ceased operating its channel 66 translator at some point in the late 1970s. Channel 66 was allocated in 1984 by the Federal Communications Commission (FCC) as a non-commercial educational station and was assigned to West Milford, New Jersey, northwest of New York City.

=== As WFME-TV ===
WFME-TV was an outgrowth of radio station WFME (94.7 FM, now WXBK), which began broadcasting Family Radio programming in 1963 and was purchased outright by the ministry in 1966. Family Stations filed an application in 1986 for the non-commercial allocation for channel 66 and went on the air March 1, 1996.

The station's schedule consisted of repeated airings of Family Bible Reading Fellowship (a video broadcast of a Family Radio Bible study program), The Joy of Music and Hymn Sing. On weekend mornings, the station carried some local public affairs programs, and several shows in Mandarin aimed at Chinese Americans. WFME-TV also broadcast a video version of Open Forum, hosted by Family Radio co-founder Harold Camping (WFME-TV's general manager); that program ended in June 2011 after Camping's prediction of the world ending proved incorrect. Initially, in 1996, WFME-TV carried the Lutheran Church–Missouri Synod-produced drama series This is the Life, local Baptist and Christian Reformed church services and a few national televangelists. In 2002, after Camping declared that "the church age is over" and that Christians should no longer participate in organized churches, these outside ministries disappeared. This is the Life was dropped in 2007.

=== As WNYJ-TV ===
In late October 2013, it was announced that WFME-TV would become an affiliate of the MHz Worldview public broadcasting network, effective November 1, 2013. On that date, WFME-TV's callsign was changed to WNYJ-TV; WFME-TV later confirmed this on its own website.

Since then, WNYJ-TV has changed programming on its station. On February 1, 2014, WNYJ began carrying Blue Ocean Network from 6 a.m. until 8 p.m. and then aired MHz Worldview programming from 8 p.m. until 6 a.m. On May 1, 2014, programming was changed again with MHz Worldview programming changed to France 24 in the nighttime hours. MHz Worldview programming was moved to the third subchannel while France 24 was added full-time to the second subchannel. In mid-September 2014, Blue Ocean Network programming was dropped and France 24 went full-time, with the second subchannel reserved for future programming. On December 1, 2014, programming was changed again with CNC World programming placed on the primary channel and France 24 programming moved back to the second sub-channel. In 2015, France 24 programming was discontinued, leaving CNC World on channel 66.1, MHz Worldview on channel 66.2 and audio from WFME-FM on another subchannel.

In the FCC's incentive auction, WNYJ-TV elected to sell its spectrum and go off the air; it sold its spectrum for $120,974,061 and indicated that it would not enter into any channel sharing agreements. WNYJ-TV ceased operations October 25, 2017; the station's license was cancelled the next day at Family Stations' request. CNC World was later moved to WZME on subchannel .2 until 2019 while MHz Worldview would not have an affiliate in the New York metropolitan area until November 2018 when WNDT-CD and WMBQ-CD (both owned by WNET) returned on the air as an MHz Worldview affiliate.

== Technical information ==
=== Subchannels ===
The station's channel was multiplexed:

Subchannels of WNYJ-TV
Channel	Res.	Short name	Programming
66.1	480i	WNYJ	CNC World
66.2	480i	WNYJ	MHz Worldview
66.6	Audio only	WNYJ	WFME-FM audio

=== Former subchannels ===
When the station was previously controlled by Family Stations, WFME-TV also carried a simulcast of WYBE, UHF digital channel 35, a non-commercial educational independent station located in Philadelphia. In addition, WFME-TV aired the audio feeds of Family Radio outlet KEAR (AM) San Francisco, as well as Family Radio's foreign language service, Radio Taiwan International, and NOAA Weather Radio from KWO35. These feeds were dropped after the station's changeover to WNYJ-TV. The audio of WFME-FM, which stayed on after the change to WNYJ-TV, was also removed by May 1, 2014. WFME-FM returned in 2015.

=== Analog-to-digital conversion ===
WFME-TV ended regular programming on its analog signal, over UHF channel 66, on February 17, 2009, to conclude the federally mandated transition from analog to digital television. The station's digital signal remained on its pre-transition UHF channel 29. WFME-TV had been one of the few stations that identified itself with its digital channel number (UHF 29) rather than its analog channel number (UHF 66). During the spring of 2009, the station returned to displaying its virtual channel as 66 on digital television receivers. WNYJ still identified with virtual channel 66 after the format swap on November 1, 2013.

== See also ==
- WYMK (106.3 MHz, formerly WDVY and WFME-FM)
- WXBK (94.7 MHz, formerly WFME)
- KCNZ-CD (former sister station in San Francisco)
- Family Radio
