= WFME =

WFME may refer to:

- WFME (AM), a radio station (1560 AM) licensed to serve New York City, New York, United States
- WFME-FM, a radio station (92.7 FM) licensed to serve Garden City, New York
- WYMK, a radio station (106.3 FM) licensed to serve Mount Kisco, New York, which held the call signs WFME and WFME-FM from 2013 to 2022
- WNYJ-TV, a television station (channel 29 digital/66 virtual) licensed to serve West Milford, New Jersey, United States, which held the call sign WFME-TV from 1988 to 2013
- WXBK, a radio station (94.7 FM) licensed to serve Newark, New Jersey, which held the call sign WFME from 1964 to January 11, 2013
- World Federation for Medical Education, a non-governmental organisation
