= Richard H. Palmquist =

American journalist

Richard Herman Palmquist is a retired American journalist and pioneer radio broadcaster.

== Early career ==
As a student at Dallas Theological Seminary in the mid-1950s, Palmquist managed the institution's radio program, which was tape recorded and aired on various radio stations. From April to September 1957, he served as a missionary in Nome, Alaska, where he and several others began the process of setting up a radio station to broadcast religious programming to the Eskimos in remote areas of Alaska and to northeastern Russia. After he left, missionaries from the Mission Covenant Church completed the challenge, and in April 1960 radio station KICY began operation.

== Family Stations Radio Network ==
From Alaska, Palmquist relocated to the San Francisco Bay Area, where he selected Harold Camping to help him start Family Radio. He also served as General Manager of the ministry for the first six years, overseeing the initial growth of the non-profit enterprise from one local station, KEAR, which first went on the air on February 4, 1959, to a network of six stations. Palmquist and his wife Dolores designed the programming during the early years. After Palmquist's departure in 1965, Harold Camping took over as General Manager.

== Tape Networks, Inc. ==
After leaving Family Radio in early 1965, Palmquist moved to Los Angeles with two other former employees of Family Radio, Barton Buhtz and Harold Hall. With their assistance, he continued producing the programing for the Family Radio network for about a year. In anticipation of assisting with other radio projects in the future, he established a broadcasting consultancy firm called Tape Networks, Inc. When production of the Family Radio programming returned to the Bay Area, Palmquist began assisting others who were interested in applying for FM radio station licenses granted by the FCC. During the late 1960s, he assisted clients around the US in putting several new FM stations on the air, including one in Delano, California.

In June 1965 Palmquist also set up a company called "American Inspiradio Network" in Van Nuys, California. The initial broadcast, under the name "America's InspiRadio Network", aired on KRKD (AM and FM) on August 1, 1965. Although this initiative was short-lived, it established the core programming goals for the next stage of Palmquist's journey into listener-supported radio.

== KDNO Radio ==
In 1970, Tape Networks, Inc. purchased radio station KDNO (FM 98.5) in Delano, and Palmquist managed it until it was sold to Mondosphere Corporation in 1997, following which the station was renamed KDFO. During the early years under Palmquist's management, KDNO mainly played classical music in the daytime and inspirational Christian music at night, (Note: The cited article reports that KDNO first went on the air in March of 1971.) with the slogans "all music all the time" and "Uplift 98.5".

== Entrepreneurship ==
Aside from his involvement in setting up and managing various radio stations, Palmquist owned and operated several other businesses. Chief among these were two small town weekly newspapers in Tulare County, California: in February 1975 he purchased the Pixley Enterprise (first published on June 16, 1922) from Tim Westbrook; and on June 1, 1977, he purchased the Terra Bella News (which dates back to at least June 1911, when Earle R. Clemens began his 30+ years as its publisher) from Loy Lamaster. In 1986 Palmquist combined the two publications, renaming them EnterpriseNews. Palmquist also soon began publishing Farm And Ranch Monthly (FARM), first in conjunction with the Tulare Farm Show (now known as the World Ag Expo), inserting the FARM into his newspapers once a month while also distributing the FARM publications at agricultural events. After two unsuccessful attempts to sell the newspapers, Palmquist ceased their operation in 1993 in order to focus his energies on KDNO radio.

Another business Palmquist established was a creative barter system called the Trade Note Interchange (TNI), which initially served as a mechanism for encouraging KDNO listeners to support the station's operations. Throughout most of the 1970s, TNI issued "Trade Notes" to KDNO listeners who sent in donations. Advertisers would pay KDNO for their ads with Trade Notes. Money from listener donations was used to cover the station's operating costs. Anyone whose balance of Trade Notes was positive could purchase goods provided by the KDNO advertisers who had paid for their ads in Trade Notes. The Trade Note Interchange worked smoothly and benefitted many, until the Internal Revenue Service (IRS) declared trade notes to be a form of currency that must be subject to taxation like any other form of monetary instrument. Palmquist responded to this IRS action by publishing his exchange of letters with the IRS in the EnterpriseNews, arguing that exchanging Trade Notes was a form of barter, not properly comparable to standard currency. The lawsuit prompted Palmquist to trade his ownership of TNI to another company, after which he began to change the direction of his radio ministry.

Palmquist also established the "Handi Directory Company", which produced annual small-sized phone directories for local townships, thus implementing the principle that guided both his business and his political involvement: "The smaller the government, the freer the enterprise, the more prosperous the community." Palmquist and his wife Dolores also co-edited the Tulare Country Farm Bureau Newsletter.

== Truth Radio ==
During the later years of his operation of KDNO, Palmquist began devoting more and more air time to programming that discussed political issues, eventually changing the primary format of the station from music to talk. As that modification of the emphasis began to take place, the radio station took on the slogan "Truth Radio". After the sale of KDNO, Truth Radio continued as an internet-based radio station, consisting mainly of various forms of political commentary and religious programs, which Palmquist loosely managed during his semi-retirement. From 1997 to 2001, Truth Radio's programming was also aired over Richard Smith's radio station KMAK (FM 100.3) in Orange Cove. After leaving the San Joaquin Valley in order to transition to retirement, Palmquist began special internet broadcasts of Truth Radio in Nipomo on June 14, 2003. In 2016, he donated Truth Radio to Higher Ground Bible College in New York State, which currently oversees its operation.

== Political activism ==
Throughout his career, Palmquist actively engaged in various forms of political activism. During the late 1970s and throughout the 1980s he used his newspapers to defend numerous controversial political causes, thus prompting one reporter to call him a "newsman with guts". (Note: Donnelly wrongly reported that Palmquist purchased the Pixley Enterprise in 1973 and the Terra Bella News in 1974. As cited above, the purchase dates were actually 1975 and 1977, respectively.) Throughout these years numerous articles in various other newspapers in California's San Joaquin Valley reported on Palmquist's political activism. Another reporter described Palmquist as a "charismatic 'superpatriot'", whose main focus in the early years of Truth Radio was to oppose "a one-world order" that "would erase all borders and make the United Nations the world governing body".

Always out to protect the "little guy" against government or big-business intervention, Palmquist's social concern included organizing town meetings to encourage citizens to take an active interest in current affairs. And he practiced what he preached, once staging a protest when developers tried to remove an old tree in order to expand a parking lot, and in a long series of newspaper articles, (Note: This article reports that Palmquist received a death threat from one police officer due to his investigation of a crash that was allegedly caused by two police officers, in which the local citizen was charged for the deaths.) defending a local woman who was imprisoned for allegedly killing two police officers in a traffic accident, in a case where both the convicted woman and witnesses claimed the police officers had caused the crash. Palmquist was instrumental in taking the latter case to the Grand Jury; although Palmquist's allegations against police corruption were dismissed, he insisted that this was due to the intervention of corrupt government officials.

One of Palmquist's most widely publicized political engagements was his media campaign that eventually forced the resignation of Tulare County Sheriff Bob Wiley in 1990. A major daily newspaper, The Bakersfield Californian, defended the Sherriff against the allegations Palmquist was publishing in the EnterpriseNews, which then led to a feud between the big and small newspapers that one article described as "the most unusual story about newspapers that has ever developed in the history of the country." Depending on one's perspective, the feud made Palmquist seem like either a "nut case or journalistic genius." He is currently retired and living in Nipomo, California.

== Books ==
During his retirement, Palmquist has written several books, including:

- Einstein, Money and Contentment (Authorhouse, 2013. Second edition; first edition 2005)
- Intimacy: Gateway to Hell or to Good Health (Xulon Press, 2016)
- What on Earth are You? In Heaven's Name (Archway Publishing, 2019)
- Creative Confusion: Popular beliefs that "ain't necessarily so" (Global Summit House, 2019)
- Gramps, I've Got a Problem (Global Summit House, 2020)
- Life is Fun (Your Online Publicist, 2021)
