= Family Radio =

Christian radio network

- Type: Non-profit
- Genre: Religious, Christian
- Founded: February 4, 1959; 67 years ago
- Founders: Richard H. Palmquist; Harold Camping; Lloyd Lindquist
- Headquarters: Franklin, Tennessee
- Products: Radio
- Parent: Loam Media
- Website: www.familyradio.org

Family Radio is a non-profit Christian radio network based in Franklin, Tennessee, United States.

Established in 1959, Family Radio airs Calvinist teaching and Christian music. The network is most widely known for its false 2011 end times predictions. At one time the 19th largest broadcaster in the United States, with 216 radio stations, the number of stations in the network has dropped drastically following its false 2011 end times predictions.

== Programming ==
One of Family Radio's oldest broadcasts was a telephone-talk program called Open Forum in which Harold Camping, the network's co-founder, president and general manager, responded to callers' questions and comments, as they relate to the Bible, and used the platform to promote his various end-time predictions. The program was finally cancelled not long after Camping's third failed "rapture-less" prediction and a stroke which he suffered in June 2011. Outside programming broadcast over the Family Radio network was limited as Camping considered the organized church apostate, and therefore devoid of God's Spirit and under Satan's control.

== History ==
Originally founded by Richard H. Palmquist, with the assistance of Harold Camping and Lloyd Lindquist as fellow members of the initial Board of Directors, Family Radio began obtaining FM broadcasting licenses on commercial frequencies in 1959, and by 2006, was ranked 19th among top broadcast companies in number of radio stations owned. Its first radio station, KEAR in San Francisco, California, then at 97.3 MHz, came on the air on Wednesday, February 4, 1959.

In 1992, Family Radio began teaching that the Great Tribulation began in May 1988, and that the rapture would occur on September 6, 1994, later adjusting the predicted date to between September 15 and 27, 1994, and telling listeners not to make any long-term plans. The network's promotion of these predictions caused some nations in Asia to prevent Family Radio from commencing operations in their countries.

Beginning in the late 1990s, Family Radio began gradually dropping outside ministries because of doctrinal changes in the network. As board members left the organization, they were not being replaced. Harold Camping's controversial teachings, as they were changing, became the focus of the entire network. Up until the late 1980s, Family Radio endorsed local church attendance but once Camping stated that the church age was over and that Satan had taken over the churches, he went on to say that people could no longer be saved within churches and that Christians should not be members or attend church services of any type. His actions led to mounting criticism from former supporters and led some Family Radio staff members to resign, as well as prompting some outside ministries to leave the network. The loss of these programs from the Family Radio schedule gave Camping more airtime to express his teachings. Around this time, former Family Radio employees, pastors, cult specialists, and others, began to publicly describe Family Radio as a cult.

=== Finances ===
By 1994, Family Radio owned 40 radio stations nationwide. Although listenership declined following its 1994 rapture prediction, the organization subsequently experienced a period of growth. By the start of its second major campaign, the network consisted of 216 AM and FM stations and two television channels.

Family Radio reported a peak in financial assets of $135 million in 2007. During the second campaign, the organization's spending increased, resulting in a decline in net assets despite a steady rise in listener contributions. Total contributions exceeded $15 million in 2008. In 2009, the organization maintained an annual budget of $36.7 million, with $117 million in assets and $18.4 million in contributions. IRS records from that year indicate the network employed 348 people.

By 2010, assets decreased to $110 million while contributions rose to $18.7 million and staff levels remained stable at 346 employees. In 2011, contributions fell to $17.2 million and assets dropped to $87.6 million, accompanied by a reduction of 26 employees. By the conclusion of 2011, assets had further dropped to $29.2 million following a 70% drop in donations; the following year, the organization secured a $30 million loan.

=== 2011 end times prediction ===
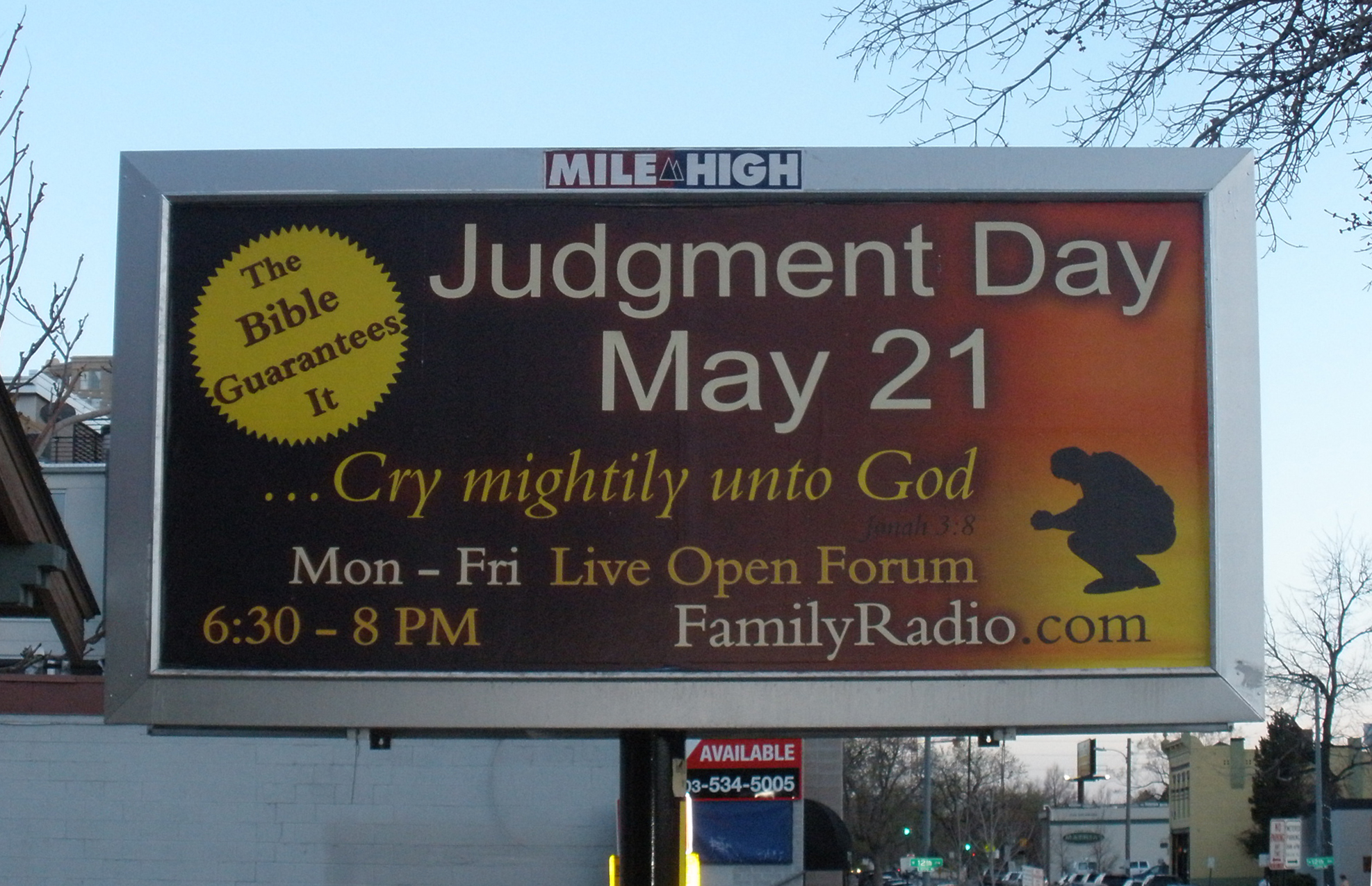
A Family Radio billboard predicting the end of the world on May 21, 2011.

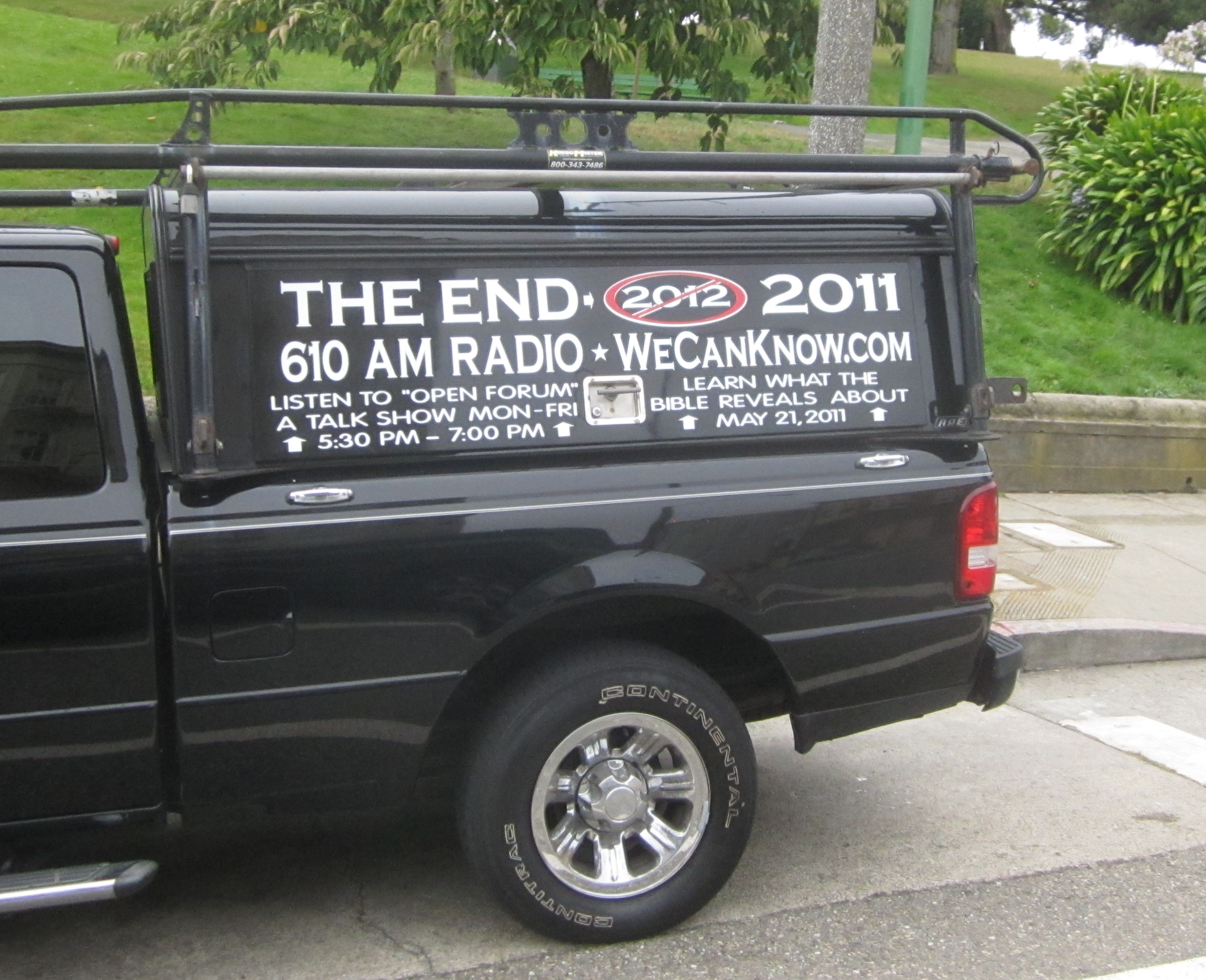
A vehicle advertising the network's 2011 end-times predictions and its station in San Francisco

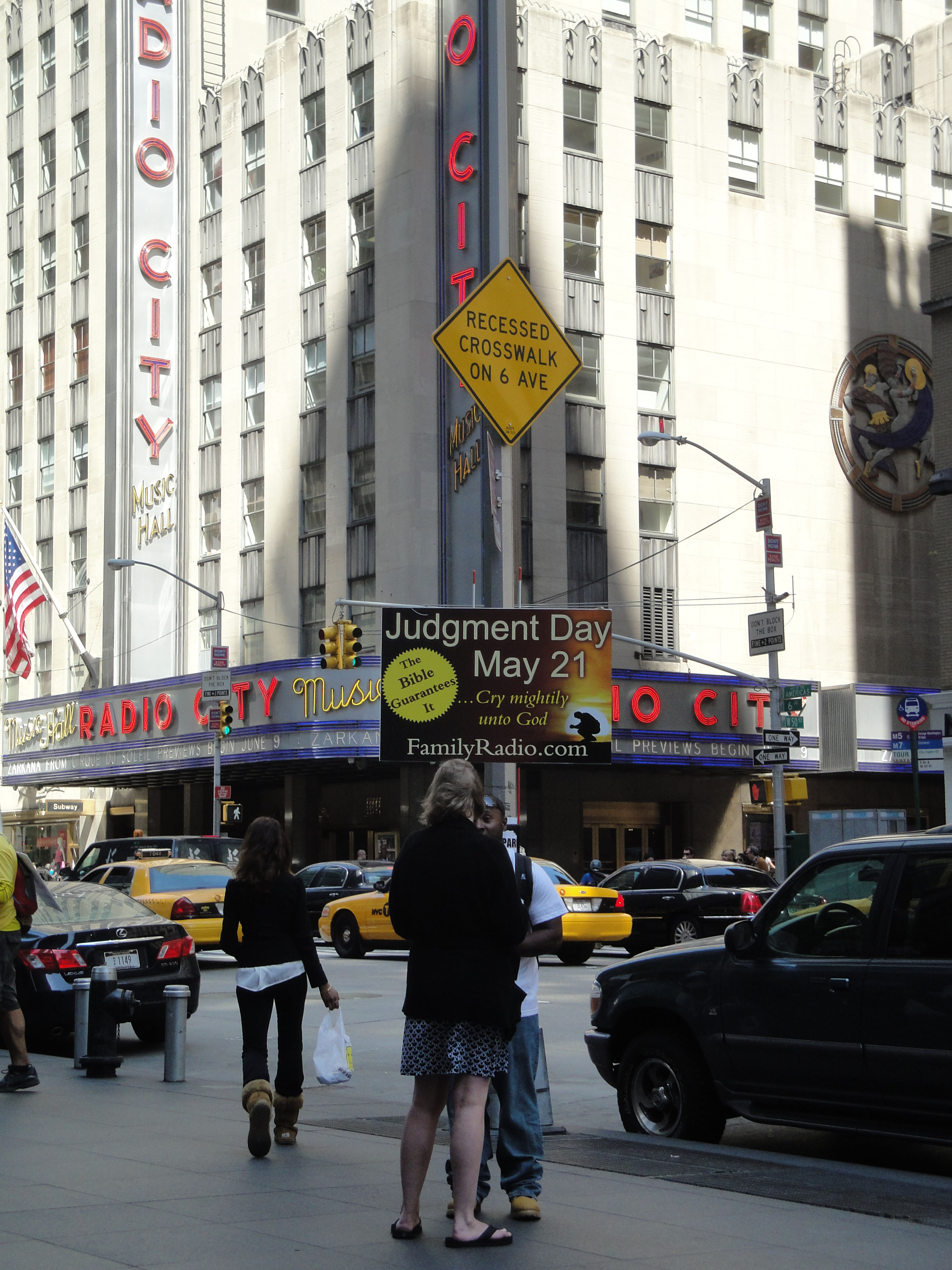
A demonstrator at Radio City Music Hall holding a Family Radio placard promoting its end times predictions

Leading up to May 2011, Family Radio spent around $100 million to advertise the now-discredited 2011 end times prediction. In the lead up to the predicted day of the rapture, many followers of Family Radio's teachings spent their life savings to donate to Family Radio or personally advertise the predicted rapture date. Others quit their jobs, sold their homes, and went into debt, relying on Camping's predictions. Several suicides were attributed to the station's apocalyptic teachings, and a woman in California tried to kill her two daughters and herself, believing that she was sparing them the tribulation that would occur following the rapture predicted by the station.

The network's apocalyptic predictions, and its followers reactions to them, led to media descriptions of the network as a doomsday cult. Scholars of apocalyptic groups found the various responses among Family Radio's followers to be consistent with what they expected to see among members of a cult, with disillusioned followers concurring that Family Radio is a cult.

Two days after the forecast "Rapture" failed to happen, A Bible Answer, a Bible teaching ministry who had been tired of the "Rapture" predictions, offered to buy 66 full-powered radio stations from Family Radio founder Harold Camping in an effort to get him to resign from preaching this doctrine. The offer came with a catch – they were not to take possession of the stations until October 22, the day after Camping's revised set-date for the end of the world. A Bible Answer's website called for Camping to resign from the Family Radio board, citing "the self-proclaimed expert on the Bible has brought reproach upon Christ, the Bible, and the church," and added "After taking the money of his supporters, let Harold give up all he has, to show he believes what he is preaching. He does not or else he would sell. It is time to get new leadership at Family Radio."

==== Aftermath and network reorganization ====
On August 3, 2011, the radio industry website Radio-Info.com reported that Family Radio was putting two of its full-powered FM stations up for sale. These stations were: WKDN in Camden, New Jersey (covering Philadelphia), and WFSI in Annapolis, Maryland (covering Baltimore and Washington, D.C.). The article indicated that the network may have sold the stations to pay off "operating deficits accumulated over the last several years". WFSI would be purchased in November 2011 by CBS Radio, which converted the station to a Spanish language dance music format under the WLZL call sign. Merlin Media, LLC struck a deal in December 2011 to acquire WKDN, which was relaunched with a talk format under the WWIQ call sign. WWIQ was later sold to Educational Media Foundation in late 2013, and became WKVP, a K-Love affiliate station.

In January 2012, Family Radio applied to the FCC to change the license of station WFME in Newark, New Jersey, near New York City, from non-commercial to commercial. The application quickly prompted conjecture from radio industry monitors that the station would soon be sold. The application was approved in February. Those rumors were confirmed on October 16, 2012, when it was announced that Family Stations would sell WFME to Atlanta-based Cumulus Media for an undisclosed price. A November message from Camping posted on the Family Radio website admitted, "Either we sell WFME or go off the air completely." The 94.7 signal would be relaunched as country-formatted station, WNSH. Concurrent with 94.7's sale to Cumulus, Family Radio purchased FM station WDVY in Mount Kisco, New York from Cumulus, which would soon after adopt Family Radio's programming and the WFME-FM callsign.

After 40 years on the air, WYFR, Family Radio's shortwave station located in Okeechobee, Florida, ceased operations on July 1, 2013. In December 2013, Radio Miami International, purchased the shortwave transmission complex and began broadcasting from there; the complex now operates under the WRMI call letters.

Harold Camping died from a fall on December 15, 2013, in his home in Alameda, California. His death was confirmed by an employee of the network. Following Camping's death, the network reaffirmed its commitment to his teachings, specifically the belief that all churches had become apostate, and that true Christians should not attend church.

On November 21, 2014, The Walt Disney Company announced it would sell WQEW in New York City to Family Radio for $12.95 million, part of Disney's decision to end terrestrial distribution of the Radio Disney format. The sale was approved on February 10, 2015, and the station returned on the air on February 27 as the new WFME (AM), thus giving Family Radio full coverage of the New York City metropolitan area for the first time in two years. Concurrent with the sale, the FCC converted WFME's broadcasting status from commercial to non-commercial. WFME has since been taken off the air, following Family Radio's sale of its transmitter site.

During 2016, Family Radio moved its corporate offices and main studios from Oakland, where it had been based since the network's inception, to the adjacent East Bay city of Alameda.

In September 2018, Family Radio formally ceased airing all programs featuring the voice of Harold Camping and discontinued the distribution of his literature. This decision was a two-fold effort to move away from Camping's unorthodox theology and to reintroduce programming from outside Bible teaching ministries into the network's schedule. The shift included new programming from noted Calvinist teachers such as John MacArthur, John Piper, and R.C. Sproul.

In 2019, Family Radio announced that it would be moving its headquarters from Alameda, California, to Franklin, Tennessee. Following the move, in 2024, parent entity Family Stations was reorganized; its assets were transferred to a new Tennessee-based entity, Loam Media, with no change in ownership or management.

== Ideology and teachings ==
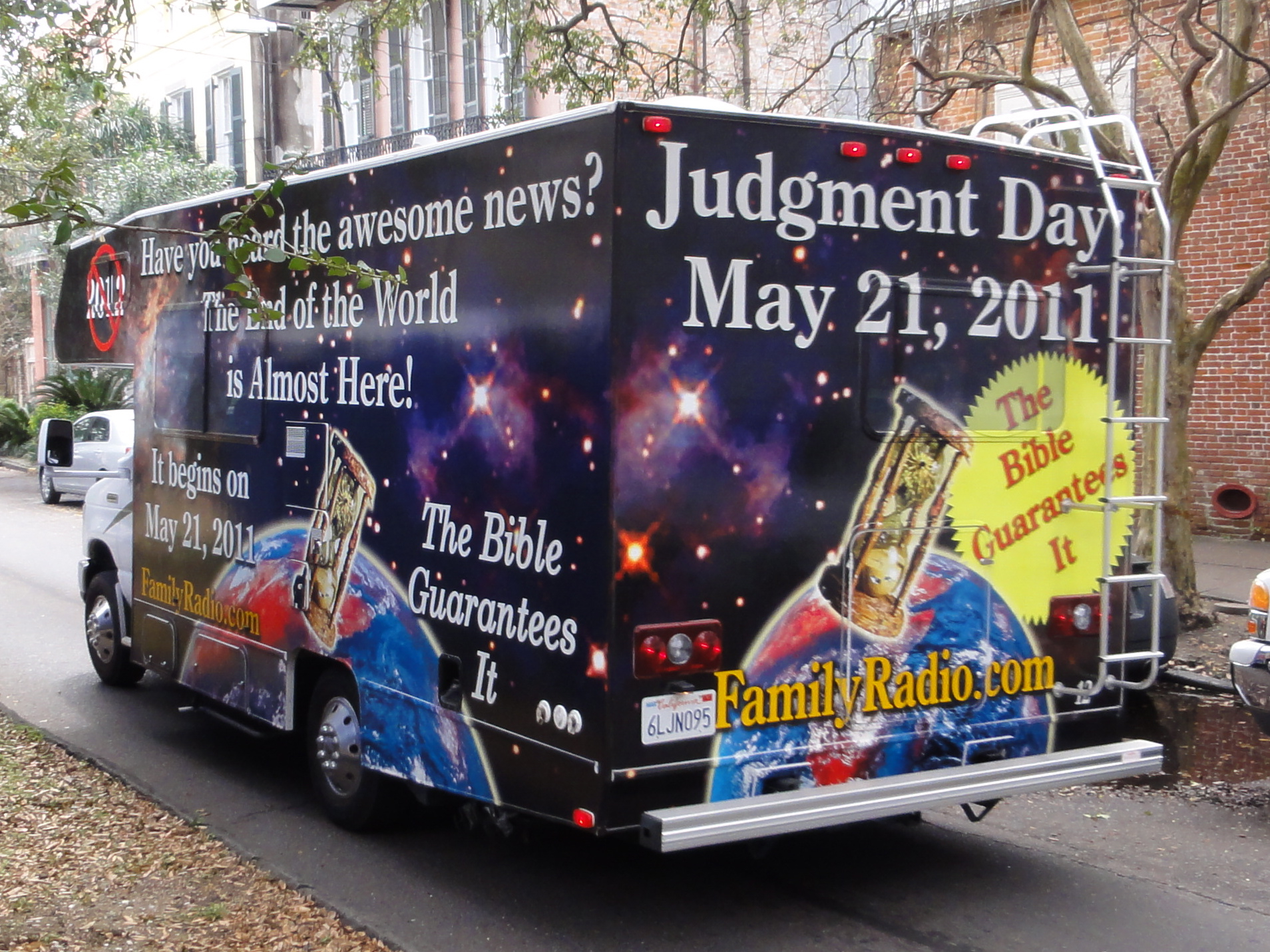
A Family Radio truck promoting its end-times predictions with the claim "The Bible Guarantees It"

Central to Camping's teaching was the belief that each sentence in the Bible is not to be understood only literally, but rather conveys multiple levels of cryptic meanings. In Camping's words, "the Bible is an earthly story with a Heavenly meaning." In Camping's publication, "We are Almost There!", he stated that certain Biblical passages pointed unquestionably to May 21, 2011, as the date of "Rapture", and pointed to October 21, 2011, as the end of the world. This event did not occur on May 21 or October 21 of that year, and no acknowledgment of false teaching has yet been offered concerning the October 21 event.

As a result of spending millions of dollars to promote his "end of the world" theory, many people sold everything they owned and donated it to Family Radio, sometimes even hundreds of thousands of dollars. The California Attorney General's office has been asked by the Freedom from Religion Foundation to investigate Camping and Family Stations, Inc. for "Fraud and Deceit".

After leaving the Christian Reformed Church in 1987, Camping taught doctrines that largely conflicted with traditional Christian teaching. The principles of Biblical hermeneutics upon which Camping framed his present teachings are:

1. The Bible alone is the Word of God, and anyone who believes that God has spoken to them through a dream, vision, or spoke in tongues, is adding to the Bible and is damned to hell.
2. Every Biblical passage must be interpreted in the light of the Bible as a whole, and red letter editions of the Bible should not be used.
3. The Bible normally conveys multiple levels of meaning or significance, and those who do not believe in all of the multiple cryptic meanings are likewise damned to hell.
4. Numerology should be applied to numbers in the Bible, but only when following the meaning Camping applies to the number.
5. That salvation is unmerited and cannot be achieved by good works, prayer, belief or acceptance. It is a pure act of God's grace and that those to be saved were chosen "before the foundation of the world". Camping also taught that all churches had become apostate and were under Satan's control, and that people could not be saved within churches.

Following Camping's death, the network reaffirmed its commitment to his teachings, specifically the belief that all churches had become apostate, and that true Christians should not attend church. For several years after Camping's death in 2013, Family Radio continued to air some of his past broadcasts and distribute his literature. But in October 2018, Family Radio discontinued using any of Camping's commentary and content, after outside ministries expressed a reluctance to allow their shows on the network while Camping's programs aired, stating "so much of it still contains elements that are very difficult."

== Stations ==
The flagship station for the network of both full-power and low-power translator stations is KEAR in San Francisco. With the sale of KEAR-FM to CBS Radio in 2005, broadcasts from San Francisco moved to an AM radio frequency. Due to FCC rules regarding translator stations, the legal primary station for the translators was changed to KEAR-FM in Sacramento, after the former primary FM station in San Francisco was sold to CBS Radio.

United States
Call sign	Frequency	City of license	State	Power (W)	ERP (W)	Height (m (ft))	FCC info
WBFR	89.5 FM	Birmingham	Alabama	—	100	205 m (673 ft)	FCC (WBFR)
KFRB	91.3 FM	Bakersfield	California	—	2,800	417 m (1,368 ft)	FCC (KFRB)
KHAP	89.1 FM	Chico	California	—	12,000	87 m (285 ft)	FCC (KHAP)
KECR	910 AM	El Cajon	California	5,000	—	—	FCC (KECR)
KFNO	90.3 FM	Fresno	California	—	2,200	594 m (1,949 ft)	FCC (KFNO)
KEFR	89.9 FM	Le Grand	California	—	1,800	653 m (2,142 ft)	FCC (KEFR)
KFRN	1280 AM	Long Beach	California	430 day 237 night	—	—	FCC (KFRN)
KPTF	1040 AM	Red Bluff	California	3,250 day 10,000 night	—	—	FCC (KPTF)
KEBR	88.1 FM	Sacramento	California	—	8,400 vertical	303 m (994 ft)	FCC (KEBR)
KEAR (Note: Flagship station)	610 AM	San Francisco	California	5,000	—	—	FCC (KEAR)
KFRY	89.9 FM	Pueblo	Colorado	—	870	647 m (2,123 ft)	FCC (KFRY)
WJFR	88.7 FM	Jacksonville	Florida	—	8,000	107 m (351 ft)	FCC (WJFR)
WAMT	1190 AM	Pine Castle/Sky Lake	Florida	4,700 day 230 night	—	—	FCC (WAMT)
WWFR	91.7 FM	Stuart	Florida	—	2,650	152 m (499 ft)	FCC (WWFR)
WJCH	91.9 FM	Joliet	Illinois	—	50,000	151 m (495 ft)	FCC (WJCH)
KDFR	91.3 FM	Des Moines	Iowa	—	32,000	136 m (446 ft)	FCC (KDFR)
KYFR	920 AM	Shenandoah	Iowa	5,000 day 2,500 night	—	—	FCC (KYFR)
WFSI	860 AM	Baltimore	Maryland	2,500 day 66 night	—	—	FCC (WFSI)
WOFR	89.5 FM	Schoolcraft	Michigan	—	10,000	42 m (138 ft)	FCC (WOFR)
KFRD	88.9 FM	Butte	Montana	—	2,800	527 m (1,729 ft)	FCC (KFRD)
KXFR	91.9 FM	Socorro	New Mexico	—	12,000	74 m (243 ft)	FCC (KXFR)
WFME-FM	92.7 FM	Garden City	New York	—	2,000	159 m (522 ft)	FCC (WFME-FM)
WFRS	88.9 FM	Smithtown	New York	—	1,500	132 m (433 ft)	FCC (WFRS)
WCUE	1150 AM	Cuyahoga Falls	Ohio	5,000 day 500 night	—	—	FCC (WCUE)
WOTL	90.3 FM	Toledo	Ohio	—	700	115 m (377 ft)	FCC (WOTL)
WYTN	91.7 FM	Youngstown	Ohio	—	900	181 m (594 ft)	FCC (WYTN)
KYOR	88.9 FM	Newport	Oregon	—	35	274 m (899 ft)	FCC (KYOR)
KPFR	89.5 FM	Pine Grove	Oregon	—	2,900	513 m (1,683 ft)	FCC (KPFR)
KQFE	88.9 FM	Springfield	Oregon	—	1,250	290 m (950 ft)	FCC (KQFE)
WEFR	88.1 FM	Erie	Pennsylvania	—	630	131 m (430 ft)	FCC (WEFR)
WKDN	950 AM	Philadelphia	Pennsylvania	43,000 day 21,000 night	—	—	FCC (WKDN)
WFCH	88.5 FM	Charleston	South Carolina	—	29,500	93 m (305 ft)	FCC (WFCH)
WFRW	93.7 FM	Nashville	Tennessee	—	1,150	230 m (750 ft)	FCC (WFRW)
KTXB	89.7 FM	Beaumont	Texas	—	9,000	173 m (568 ft)	FCC (KTXB)
KUFR	91.7 FM	Salt Lake City	Utah	—	130	−63 m (−207 ft)	FCC (KUFR)
KJVH	89.5 FM	Longview	Washington	—	100	238 m (781 ft)	FCC (KJVH)
WMWK	88.1 FM	Milwaukee	Wisconsin	—	4,600	280 m (920 ft)	FCC (WMWK)

Notes:

In addition to its full-powered stations, Family Radio is relayed by an additional 18 FM translators:

United States (translators)
Call sign	Frequency (MHz)	City of license	State	FCC info
K220EY	91.9	Porterville	California	FCC (K220EY)
K214CA	90.7	Grand Junction	Colorado	FCC (K214CA)
W218CW	91.5	West Palm Beach	Florida	FCC (W218CW)
K206DU	89.1	Lafayette	Louisiana	FCC (K206DU)
W252AQ	98.3	Lake Charles	Louisiana	FCC (W252AQ)
K216GT	91.1	Great Falls	Montana	FCC (K216GT)
K220GM	91.9	Placitas	New Mexico	FCC (K220GM)
K214BO	90.7	Ashland	Oregon	FCC (K214BO)
K223AO	92.5	Florence	Oregon	FCC (K223AO)
K203BE	88.5	Roseburg	Oregon	FCC (K203BE)
W208AF	89.5	Nanticoke	Pennsylvania	FCC (W208AF)
W207AE	89.3	Reading	Pennsylvania	FCC (W207AE)
K220EI	91.9	Ogden	Utah	FCC (K220EI)
W220BD	91.9	Roanoke	Virginia	FCC (W220BD)
K219CA	91.7	Casper	Wyoming	FCC (K219CA)

=== Television ===
- WNYJ-TV, West Milford – Newark, New Jersey – New York (Now defunct, previously broadcast religious programming as WFME-TV)
