= Harold Camping =

American Christian radio broadcaster and evangelist (1921–2013)

- Born: Harold Egbert Camping; July 19, 1921; Boulder, Colorado, U.S.
- Died: December 15, 2013 (aged 92); Alameda, California, U.S.
- Education: University of California, Berkeley (BS)
- Occupations: Talk radio personality, evangelist
- Years active: 1958–2011
- Known for: Christian broadcasting, false end times predictions
- Spouse: Shirley Camping (m. 1943)
- Children: 7
- Website: familyradio.org

Harold Egbert Camping (July 19, 1921 – December 15, 2013) was an American Christian radio broadcaster and evangelist. Beginning in 1958, he served as president of Family Radio, a California-based radio station group that, at its peak, broadcast to more than 150 markets in the United States. In October 2011, he retired from active broadcasting following a stroke, but still maintained a role at Family Radio until his death. Camping was notorious for issuing a succession of failed predictions of dates for the End Times, which temporarily gained him a global following and millions of dollars of donations.

Camping first predicted that the Judgment Day would occur on or about September 6, 1994. When it failed to occur, he revised the date to September 29 and then to October 2. In 2005, Camping predicted the Second Coming of Christ to May 21, 2011, whereupon the saved would be taken up to heaven in the rapture, and that "there would follow five months of fire, brimstone and plagues on Earth, with millions of people dying each day, culminating on October 21, 2011, with the final destruction of the world."

His prediction for May 21, 2011 was widely reported, in part because of a large-scale publicity campaign by Family Radio, and it prompted ridicule from atheist organizations and rebuttals from Christian organizations. After May 21 passed without the predicted events, Camping said he believed that a "spiritual" judgment had occurred on that date, and that the physical Rapture would occur on October 21, 2011, simultaneously with the final destruction of the universe by God. Except for one press appearance on May 23, 2011, Camping largely avoided press interviews after May 21, particularly after he suffered a stroke in June 2011. After October 21, 2011, passed without the predicted apocalypse, the mainstream media labeled Camping a false prophet and commented that his ministry would collapse after the "failed 'Doomsday' prediction".

Camping was reported to have retired from his position at Family Radio on October 16, 2011, only days before his final prediction for the end of the world. However, his daughter later clarified that he had not retired outright, but was maintaining a role at Family Radio while remote working. Camping admitted in a private interview that he no longer believed that anybody could know the time of the Rapture or the end of the world, in stark contrast to his previously staunch position on the subject. In March 2012, he stated that his attempt to predict a date was "sinful", and that his critics had been right in emphasizing the words of Matthew 24:36: "of that day and hour knoweth no man". He added that he was now searching the Bible "even more fervently...not to find dates, but to be more faithful in [his] understanding." After the failure of Camping's prophecies, Family Radio suffered a significant loss of assets, staff and revenue.

== Biography ==
Harold Egbert Camping was born on July 19, 1921, in Boulder, Colorado, and moved at an early age to California. Both his parents were Dutch immigrants to the United States, his mother from Friesland, his father from Groningen. They first met each other in the United States. In 1942, Camping earned a B.S. degree in civil engineering from the University of California, Berkeley. In 1943, he married his wife, Shirley. During World War II he worked as an engineer for a government contractor. Shortly after the end of the war, he started a construction business. He and his family were members of the Christian Reformed Church until 1988.

=== Family Radio ===
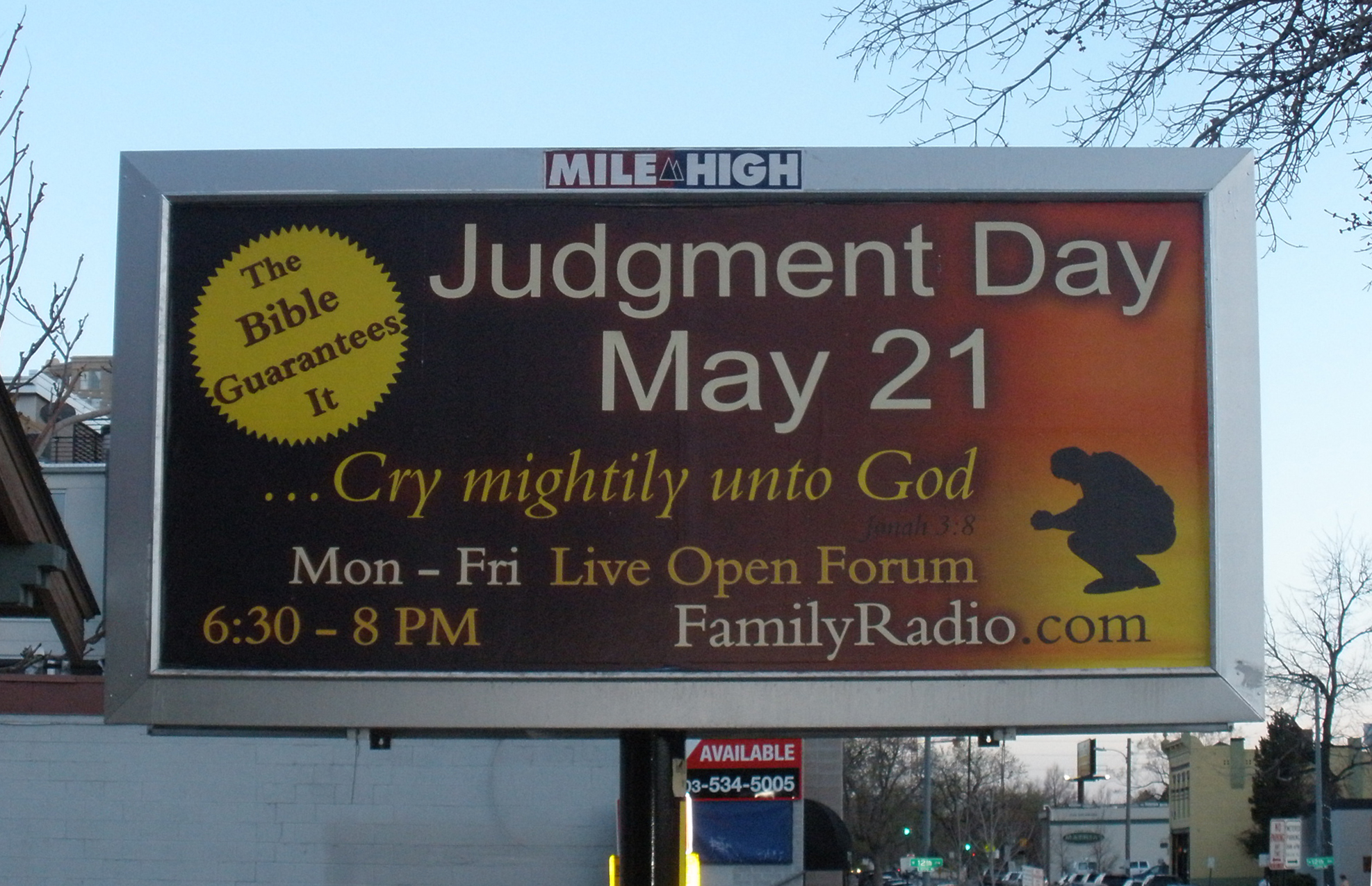
A Family Radio sign in Denver predicting the end of the world on May 21, 2011

In 1958, Camping joined with other individuals of Christian Reformed, Bible Baptist, and conservative Presbyterian backgrounds to purchase an FM radio station in San Francisco, California. The radio station – KEAR, then at 97.3 MHz – was used to broadcast traditional Christian Gospel to the conservative Protestant community and minister to the general public. Through the 1960s, Family Radio acquired six additional FM stations and seven AM stations under guidelines established by the Federal Communications Commission (FCC).

In 1961, Family Radio began running the Open Forum, a live, weeknight call-in program that Camping hosted until 2011. Listeners were invited to call in, primarily with questions about the meaning of certain passages from the Bible, and Camping answered them by means of interpretations, often with reference to other Biblical passages. Occasionally, questions were posed relating to general Christian doctrine, ranging from the nature of sin and salvation to matters involving everyday life, such as marriage, sexual morality and education. The Open Forum continued running until Camping's partial retirement in July 2011, and was broadcast on the more than 150 stations owned by Family Radio in the United States. The Open Forum was also translated into many foreign languages and (together with other Family Radio programming) was broadcast worldwide via shortwave station WYFR, a network of AM and FM radio stations, a cable television station and the Internet. In October 2012, over a year after the failure of Camping's prophecies, Family Radio began airing repeats of his broadcasts.

Family Radio runs various programs on its radio stations. Before Camping started teaching that the "Church Age" had ended, programs produced outside of Family Radio were welcome provided they did not accept any "extra-Biblical revelation", and were associated with teachings accepted by the historic Christian faith. Family Radio also used at least three television stations: WFME-TV in the New York City area; KFTL-CD in San Francisco, California; and KHFR-LD in Boise, Idaho. Following the digital transition of 2009, Family Radio used its subchannels of WFME and KFTL for various purposes – in WFME's case, the digital signal of that station broadcasts ten separate subchannels, the first being the main channel, and the others carrying audio feeds of other Family Radio services, as well as one broadcasting NOAA Weather Radio.

Family Radio spent over US$100 million on the information campaign for Camping's 2011 end times prediction, financed by sales and swaps of broadcast outlets.

=== The Biblical Calendar of History ===
In 1970, Camping published The Biblical Calendar of History (later greatly expanded in his 1974 book Adam When?), in which he dated the Creation of the world to the year 11,013 BC and the Flood to 4990 BC. This was in contradiction to Bishop James Ussher's famous 17th-century chronology, which placed the Creation at 4004 BC and the Flood at 2349 BC. Camping argued that Ussher's dates "agree neither with the Biblical nor the secular evidence", asserting that Ussher's methodology was flawed.

Camping surmised that the word begat in the Old Testament scriptures did not necessarily imply an immediate father-son relationship, as had been assumed by Ussher and others who (Camping felt) had not correctly interpreted the biblical timeline. Camping noted the use of the phrase "called his name" ("qara shem" in Hebrew, found three times in Genesis 4–5), which he characterized as a "clue phrase" to indicate an immediate father-son relationship. Despite the fact that this "clue phrase" does not occur regarding Noah naming Shem, Camping maintained that there is enough evidence to otherwise conclude that they did, in fact, have an immediate father-son relationship. He also points out the use of qara shem in Isaiah 7:14, which he interpreted as meaning, "Behold, a virgin shall conceive, and bear a son, and shall call his name Immanuel."

Camping assumed that, since qara shem implies an immediate father-son relationship (e.g., Adam–Seth, Seth–Enos, and Lamech–Noah), all other relationships between the Antediluvian patriarchs (except Noah–Shem) are of ancestors and their distant descendants. That is, when one patriarch died, the next one who is mentioned was not his son but was actually a distant multi-generational grandson who was born in that same year. Camping thus formulated the concept of the "reference patriarch," i.e., various events are referenced to a specific year of a particular patriarch's life as a means of keeping an accurate chronological record. Although there is no evidence that any ancient civilization kept track of time in this way, Camping used this concept as the basis for his view of Biblical chronology.

== Teachings ==
Camping taught that a Biblical calendar had been hidden according to Daniel 12:9 and Revelation 22:10, detailing the imminent end of the world (with alleged Biblical evidence pointing to the date for the Rapture as May 21, 2011); of the "end of the church age" (which asserts that churches are no longer the vehicle used by God for salvation, 1 Peter 4:17); and of predestination (Ephesians 1:4–5), according to which God determined before the beginning of the world which individuals are to be saved. In Camping's later publications, he stated that May 21, 2011 would be "the first day of the Day of Judgment" and October 21, 2011, would be the end of the world.

Camping did not consider Family Radio a church and did not claim ordained or hierarchical authority within a church or institution. Camping claimed that the church institutions do not employ the Bible alone as the sole authority. According to Camping, each church or denomination has its own unique set of doctrines and hermeneutics, which dictate how they understand the Bible. Family Radio's sole focus on the Bible is what he believed distinguishes it from mainstream churches. In his book 1994?, he claimed there was a very high likelihood that the world would end in September 1994, although he did acknowledge in the book "the possibility does exist that I could be wrong"; Family Radio remained popular despite this failed prediction. Both before and after the failure of his 2011 prophecies, Camping received criticism from a number of leaders, scholars, and laymen within the Christian community, who argued that Jesus Christ taught that no man knows the day or the hour of the Lord's return. Camping responded to those who labelled him a "date-setter", following his own method of Biblical interpretation, by asserting that he followed the Bible's method of interpretation.

Central to Camping's teaching was his belief that the Bible alone is the word of God in its entirety, and thus is absolutely trustworthy. However, he emphasized, this does not mean that each sentence in the Bible is to be understood only literally. Rather, the meaning of individual Biblical passages also needs to be interpreted in the light of two factors. The first is the context of the Bible as a whole. The second is its spiritual meaning. In Camping's words, "the Bible is an earthly story with a Heavenly meaning." This stems from Mark 4:34, which states that Jesus did not speak to the disciples without using parables. Because Christ is said to be the living Word of God, therefore, the historical accounts of the Old Testament can also be seen as parables. For example, in Camping's view, Joshua in the Book of Joshua (whose name in Hebrew is identical to the name "Jesus" in Greek) is a picture of Christ, who safely led the Israelites (who supposedly represented those who became saved) across the Jordan River (a representation of the wrath of God) into the land of Canaan (which represents the kingdom of God).

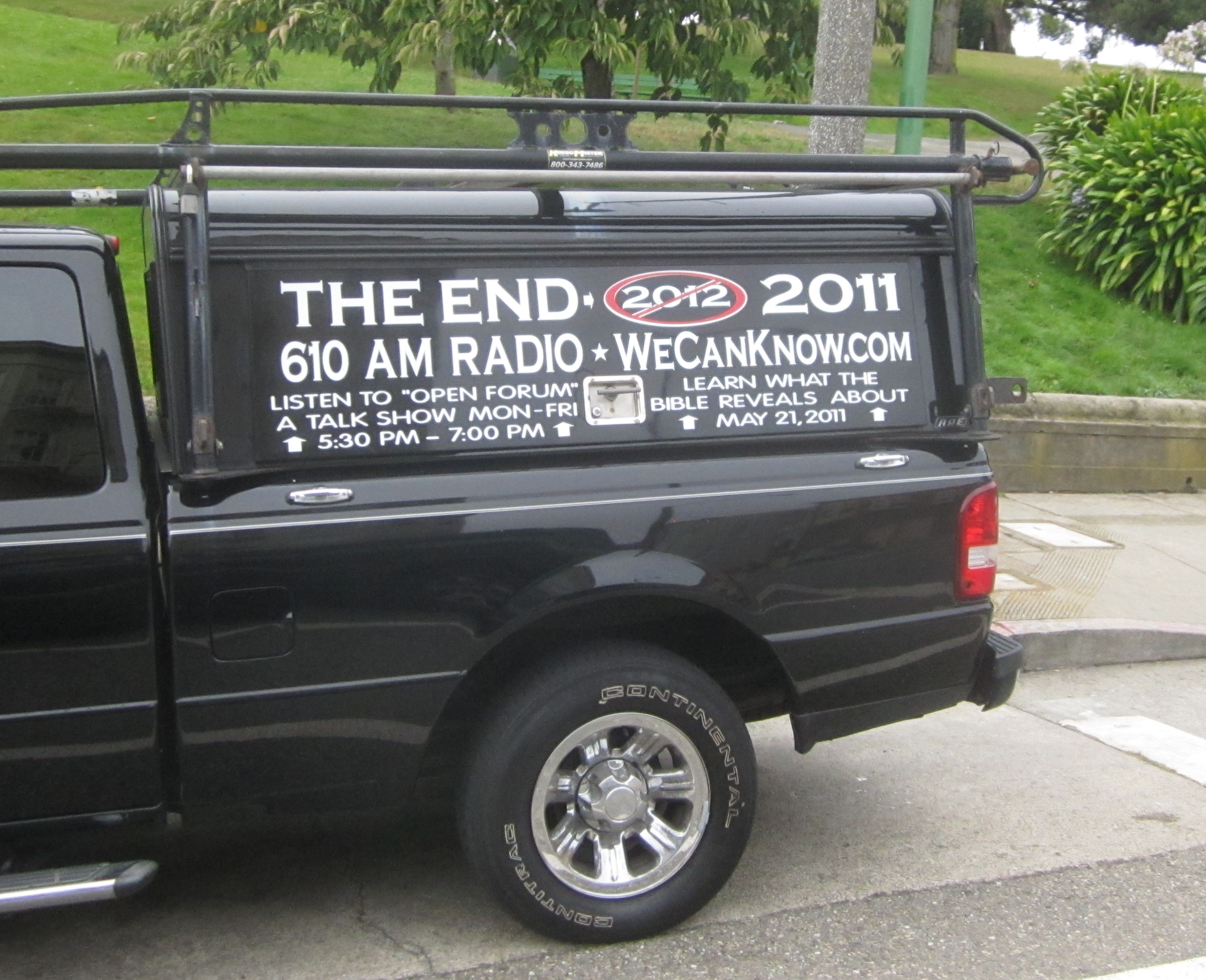
A vehicle in San Francisco proclaiming Harold Camping's 2011 prediction

=== Theology ===
After leaving the Christian Reformed Church in 1988, Camping taught doctrines that explicitly conflicted with the doctrines and confessions of the Christian Reformed Church and churches of the Reformed and Presbyterian traditions. Examples of Camping's teachings which varied from conventional Reformed doctrines include:

- Departing from Calvinist doctrine, Camping taught a relative free will for humanity and that humans are not totally depraved. However, he subscribed to the idea that salvation is unmerited, cannot be achieved by good works or prayer, and is a pure act of God's grace.
- Departing from the doctrine of eternal torment for the unsaved in a place called Hell, Camping taught annihilationism: that life will end and existence will cease for the unsaved soul.
- Departing from scriptural doctrines stating that no one can know the time of Christ's second coming, Camping taught (until 2011) that the exact time of the Rapture would be revealed sometime near the end of the world (as per the Daniel 12:9–13 prophecy).
- Camping taught that all churches have become apostate and thus must be abandoned. He encouraged personal Bible study and listening to his Family Radio broadcasts.

=== End times calculations ===
Camping's teachings regarding the timing of Christ's second coming were based on the cycles of:

- Jewish feast days in the Hebrew calendar, as described in the Old Testament,
- the lunar month calendar (1 synodic month = 29.53059 days), and
- a close approximation of the Gregorian calendar tropical year (365.24219 days, rounded to 365.2422).

He projected these cycles into modern times and combined the results with other information in the Bible.

Camping's date for the crucifixion of Christ – Friday, April 1, AD 33 (Gregorian) – is nominally the same day as one of those supported by other 20th-century commentators: Friday, April 3, AD 33 (Julian). However, the dates differ because Camping used the Gregorian calendar, while most commentators use the older Julian calendar, which had a two-day difference during the 1st century AD (they now differ by thirteen days).

In 1992, Camping published a book titled 1994?, in which he proclaimed that Christ's return might be on September 6, 1994. In that publication, he also mentioned that 2011 could be the end of the world. Camping's predictions use 1988 as a significant year in the events preceding the apocalypse; this was also the year he left Alameda Bible Fellowship. As a result, some individuals criticized him for "date-setting." Other evangelicals, including John Walvoord and Tremper Longman, heavily criticized Camping for his prediction, with Walvoord calling it a "screwball interpretation." After the prophecy failed to transpire, biblical scholars doubled down on their criticism, with one stating that Camping had "seriously compromised himself as a Bible teacher." Former Family Radio employee Matt Tuter recalled: "There were a lot of people who sold their houses, who gave up their life savings. And Harold thought it was funny. He would come into my office and say, 'So-and-so called me. They're broke, but I’m not giving their money back.' Harold was a very twisted man."

Camping's later publications, We are Almost There! and To God be The Glory, referred to additional Bible passages which, in his opinion, pointed to May 21, 2011, as the date for the Rapture and October 21, 2011, as the date for the end of the world.

== 2011 end times prediction ==
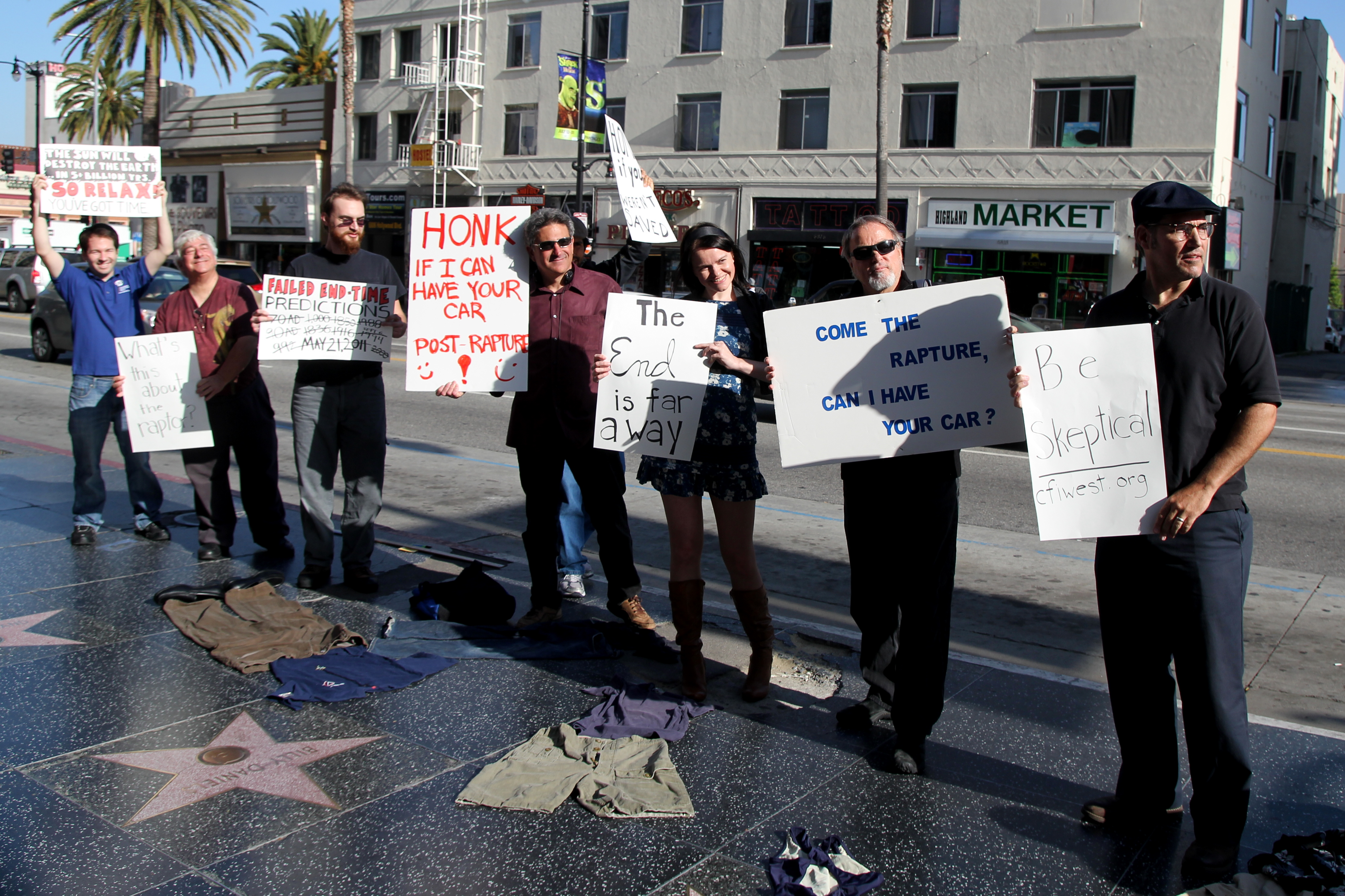
Members of the skeptic group IIG counter-protesting Harold Camping's end-of-the-world prediction on Hollywood Boulevard on May 21, 2011

Camping gained notoriety owing to his incorrect prediction that the Rapture would take place on May 21, 2011, and that the end of the world would subsequently take place five months later on October 21, 2011. Followers of Camping claimed that around 200 million people (approximately 2.8% of the world's 2011 population) would be raptured, and publicized the prediction in numerous countries. It has also been reported that a 14-year-old Russian girl named Nastya Zachinova committed suicide over his prediction.

Reuters reported on May 21 that the curtains were drawn in Camping's house in Alameda, California, and that no one was answering the door. Camping emerged from his home on May 22, saying he was "flabbergasted" that the Rapture had not occurred. He stated that he was "looking for answers," and would say more when he returned to work on May 23.

On May 23, 2011, in an appearance before the press, Camping stated he had reinterpreted his prophecy. In his revised claim, May 21 was a "spiritual" judgment day, and the physical Rapture would occur on October 21, 2011, simultaneously with the destruction of the world. Camping said his company would not return money donated by followers to publicize the failed May 21 prediction, stating: "We're not at the end. Why would we return it?"

Atheist and skeptic groups such as American Atheists and IIG gathered across the country with signs attracting attention away from Camping's followers who were in seclusion. Meanwhile, mainstream Christian groups distanced themselves from Camping's predictions.

In September 2011, Camping and several other prognosticators who incorrectly predicted various dates for the end of world were jointly awarded an Ig Nobel Prize for "teaching the world to be careful when making mathematical assumptions and calculations". In October 2011, News24 reported that the size of Camping's congregation had dwindled to "about 25 adults on a typical Sunday". Camping and his followers largely avoided the media in the months following May 2011, and he remained in seclusion after October 21, 2011, had passed without his predictions coming true. On October 21, Time magazine's website listed Camping's end times prediction as one of Time's "Top 10 Failed Predictions".

=== Aftermath ===
In March 2012, Camping admitted that his predictions were in error, stating: "We humbly acknowledge we were wrong about the timing." He also announced the "End to Doomsday Predictions". In May 2012, a year after the failure of Camping's prophecy, Religion Dispatches published a report on Camping's disillusioned former followers, some of whom had reportedly come to view him as a cult leader.

In October 2012, the Christian Post reported that Family Radio was re-broadcasting recordings of Camping's teachings. In March 2013, it was calculated that Family Stations Inc. spent more than $5 million on billboard advertising in 2011, the year the apocalypse was predicted to occur, and the network was reported to be suffering from a major loss of revenue, forcing it to sell its main radio stations and lay off staff.

In January 2014, a month after Camping's death, Family Radio stated that it would maintain his mission and theology, including the belief that all established Christian churches are apostate. For the next few years, Family Radio continued to air Camping's past broadcasts and distribute his literature. But in October 2018, Family Radio discontinued using any of his commentary and content because "so much of it still contains elements that are very difficult." Tom Evans, who succeeded Camping as president and general manager of Family Radio, said "Family Radio has come out of self-imposed isolation and we've repented from many of our former positions, date-setting the end of the world and all that, as well as the condemnation of the church." They are now using content from multiple evangelical sources, such as the young-earth creationist organization Answers in Genesis and Alistair Begg's Truth for Life program.

== Health and death ==
On June 9, 2011, Camping suffered a stroke and was hospitalized. In June, a neighbor stated his speech had become slurred as a result of the stroke, but on July 15, Family Radio stated Camping's speech was unaffected. After leaving the hospital, he moved to a nursing home for rehabilitation, before returning home to continue his recovery. Previously, on June 23, Family Radio had announced that it would replace Camping's Open Forum program with new programming.

Camping died on December 15, 2013, in Alameda, California, as a result of complications from a fall at his home two weeks earlier. His death was confirmed by an employee of the Family Radio Network.

== See also ==
- Apocalypticism
- Millerism
- List of dates predicted for apocalyptic events
- David Meade (another end-times predictor)
- 2012 phenomenon
