= Blue Ocean Network =

- Country: China
- Broadcast area: Worldwide
- Network: Satellite & Cable television network
- Headquarters: Beijing

Programming
- Language(s): English

History
- Launched: 2010

Links
- Website: www.bon.tv

Blue Ocean Network (BON, Chinese: 蓝海电视) is an English-language television news network based in China. According to the Global Times, it is the first privately owned Chinese commercial TV network.

It states it "is one of the first private English-language Television Network to offer International viewers fresh China-focused news and features, including business & technology, travel, art & creativity, and health & living programming, produced exclusively from China."

It previously stated its aim was to provide "comprehensive and objective programming produced exclusively from, and about, China".

It is funded by CDH Venture Partners. Other sources of its revenues include local Chinese governments.

== Programming ==
The station primarily broadcasts two types of shows, news and culture.

The news shows have included China Price Watch, China Beat, China Take, MicroBlog Buzz, On the Level, and Media Watch. Previous and current news anchors include Fergus Thompson, Joshua Linder, Neal Jones, David Nye, Joseph Nordstrom, Michael Butterworth, Ken Xu, Matt Sheehan, Yue Xu, and a number of others with insight into China related topics. Because it is run independently, BON's news programming has been able to report on a variety of topics considered taboo on state-run Chinese news networks.

Cultural programming includes reality travel shows, talk shows, and educational programming.

Many of the station's programs are available on television and online platforms. A number of the videos have gone viral on YouTube and Chinese social media platforms such as Weibo, Baidu Video, Sohu, and Youku Tudou.

== Television availability as of December 2014 ==
The official website's About Us section states that its programming "is available on Dish Network USA as part of the International Basic Package and Chinese Package, on Sky TV (BSkyB) across Great Britain as part of the Basic Package, on MHz Networks USA in Washington DC, and on Broadcast Stations and Cable Networks across more than 30 U.S. States."
