= WFME-FM =

Family Radio station in Garden City, New York

- Garden City, New York; United States
- Broadcast area: Long Island; New York City
- Frequency: 92.7 MHz
- Branding: Family Radio

Programming
- Language: English
- Format: Christian radio
- Network: Family Radio

Ownership
- Owner: Family Radio; (Loam Media, Inc.)
- Sister stations: WFME; WFRS; WYMK

History
- First air date: October 28, 1959
- Former call signs: WLIR-FM (1959–1987); WDRE-FM (1987–1996); WLIR-FM (1996–2004); WZAA (2004–2007); WQBU-FM (2007–2022)
- Call sign meaning: Where Faith (or Family) Means Everything

Technical information
- Licensing authority: FCC
- Facility ID: 30573
- Class: A
- ERP: 2,000 watts
- HAAT: 159 meters (522 ft)
- Transmitter coordinates: 40°45′26.4″N 73°42′50.5″W

Links
- Public license information: Public file; LMS
- Webcast: Listen live
- Website: www.familyradio.org

WFME-FM (92.7 FM, Family Radio) is a radio station licensed to Garden City, New York, and serving the western Long Island and New York City area. It is owned by Family Radio and broadcasts a religious format consisting of Reformed Christian teaching as well as hymns and conservative religious music. The station's transmitter is located at the North Shore Towers in Glen Oaks, Queens.

== History ==
Univision purchased the station in January 2004 and simulcast "Latino Mix" WCAA 105.9 FM licensed to Newark, New Jersey (WCAA would later move to 96.3 FM as the result of a frequency swap with classical music station WQXR).

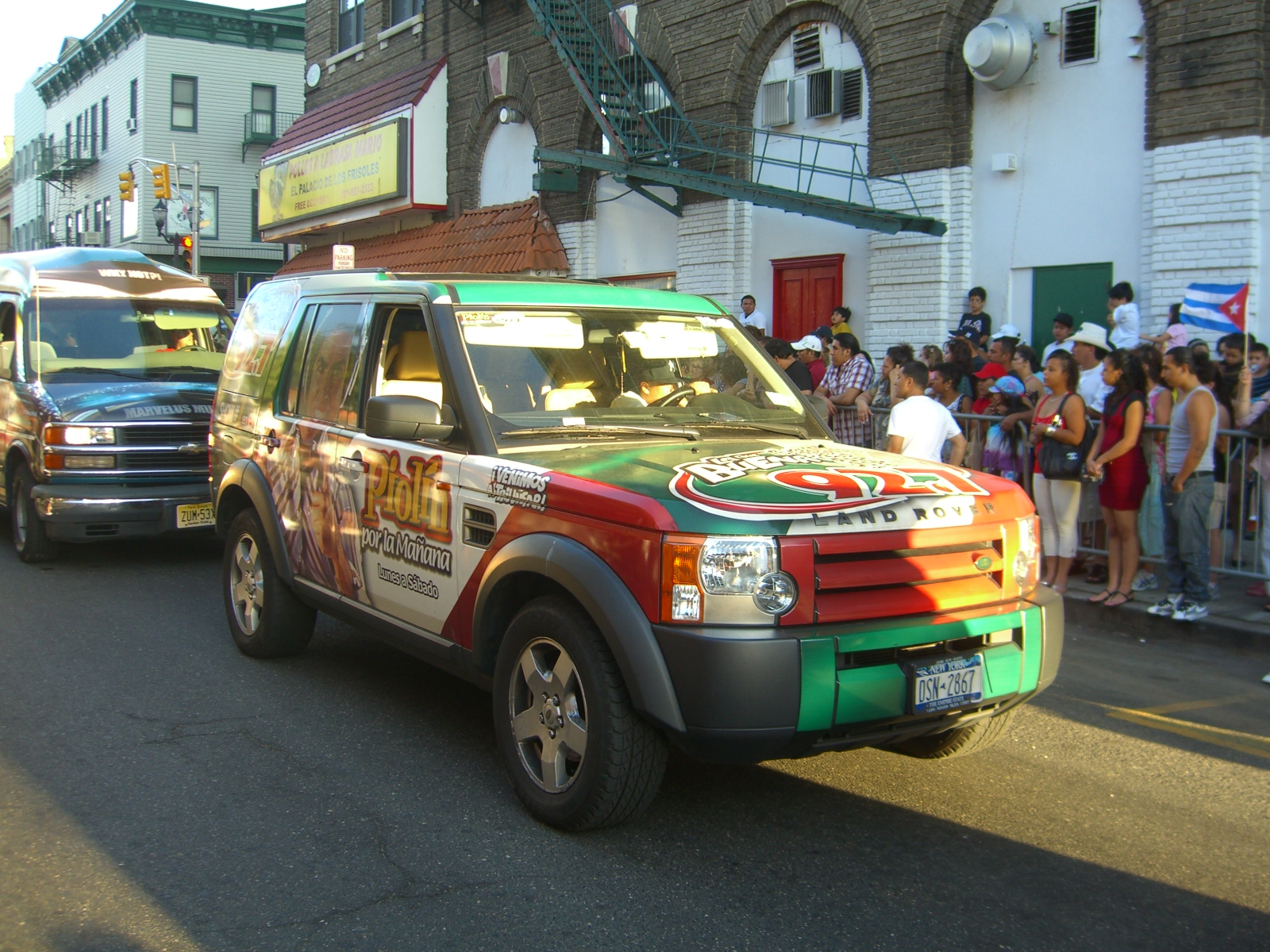
A WQBU-FM car in the 2010 North Hudson Cuban Day Parade in Union City, New Jersey.

On Memorial Day 2005, both stations became "La Kalle," a reggaeton-formatted station. The station at 105.9 became WCAA and 92.7 became WZAA.

In late January 2007, Univision ended the simulcast and changed the call sign to WQBU-FM.

In March 2007, the station announced that they would become the Spanish-language home of the New York Yankees, with Beto Villa as the play-by-play announcer.

In 2010, the station became the Spanish language home of the New York Mets, with Juan Alicea and Max Perez Jimenez with the calls.

Logo as "Mami 92.7"

On November 15, 2012, WQBU-FM changed their format to Spanish Tropical, branded as "Mami 92.7".

On March 31, 2014, WQBU-FM switched to a news/talk format nationally syndicated by Univision America. This makes it the 10th station overall and the first FM station in Univision's portfolio to have the Univision America network.

On October 22, 2014, WQBU-FM changed their format to Regional Mexican, branded as "92.7 Nueva York".

In March 2016, WQBU-FM rebranded as "Que Buena 92.7".

On August 2, 2019, WQBU-FM changed their format from Regional Mexican to Spanish AC, due to 93.1 Amor having dropped the Spanish AC format in the spring of 2018 in favor of Bachata Music.

On November 9, 2020, WQBU-FM began adding Salsa romántica titles from artists such as Eddie Santiago, Gilberto Santa Rosa, Grupo Niche, Jerry Rivera, Willie Colón and Rey Ruiz.

On December 3, 2021, it was announced that the station had been purchased by Family Radio. Upon completing the sale on January 20, 2022, Family Radio announced that, in addition to relaunching the station with its religious programming, it would change the call sign to WFME-FM. The station change occurred at midnight on Friday, January 21, 2022, and 92.7 began broadcast of Family Radio East nationally syndicated programming. The call sign change occurred on January 26, 2022.
