= WXBK =

- Newark, New Jersey; United States
- Broadcast area: North Jersey; New York City; Nassau County
- Frequency: 94.7 MHz (HD Radio)
- Branding: 94-7 The Block

Programming
- Language: English
- Format: Classic hip-hop
- Subchannels: HD2: Country music "New York's Country 94.7 HD2"; HD3: WNYZ-LD simulcast

Ownership
- Owner: Audacy, Inc.; (Audacy License, LLC)
- Sister stations: WCBS-FM; WFAN; WFAN-FM; WHSQ; WINS; WINS-FM; WNEW-FM

History
- First air date: 1947
- Former call signs: WAAT-FM (1947–1958); WNTA-FM (1958–1962); WJRZ-FM (1962–1963); WFME (1963–2013); WRXP (2013); WNSH (2013–2021)
- Call sign meaning: From "The Block" branding

Technical information
- Licensing authority: FCC
- Facility ID: 20886
- Class: B
- ERP: 40,000 watts
- HAAT: 166 meters (545 ft)
- Transmitter coordinates: 40°47′53.4″N 74°5′25.5″W
- Translators: HD3: 98.3 W252CS (Palisades Park); HD3: 101.5 W268BY (Queens, New York)
- Repeaters: 94.7 WXBK-FM1 (Hempstead, New York); 94.7 WXBK-FM2 (Newark)

Links
- Public license information: Public file; LMS
- Webcast: Listen live (via Audacy); HD2: Listen live (via Audacy)
- Website: www.audacy.com/947theblocknyc; HD2: www.audacy.com/newyorkscountry947

WXBK (94.7 MHz, 94-7 The Block) is a classic hip-hop-formatted FM radio station licensed to serve Newark, New Jersey, owned by Audacy, Inc. WXBK's studios are located in the combined Audacy facility in the Hudson Square neighborhood of Manhattan, and its transmitter is located in Rutherford, New Jersey.

WXBK broadcasts in the HD Radio format.

== History ==
=== Early years ===
WFME's logo in 2012, under Family Radio ownership.

The 94.7 FM frequency signed on in 1947, as WAAT-FM, and was owned by the Bremer Broadcasting Company along with sister station WAAT (970 AM). The following year, Bremer launched New Jersey's first television station, WATV on channel 13 transmitting from the WAAT-FM tower. In 1957, the three stations were sold by Bremer to National Telefilm Associates, who changed the operation's call letters to WNTA-FM. During this period, the station had diversified programming such as jazz, classical music, and easy listening music.

National Telefilm split up its holdings in 1961, with WNTA-TV being sold to a New York City-based nonprofit educational group (it is now WNET), and the WNTA radio stations going to Communications Industries Broadcasting. The new owners changed the calls to WJRZ-FM and initially retained the station's previous format, however, on April 14, 1963, Family Radio, a Christian broadcaster then based in Oakland, California, began leasing airtime on WJRZ-FM. In 1964, the station was renamed WFME, and in March 1966, Family Radio purchased 94.7 FM outright and began airing its religious programming around-the-clock.

WFME's local programming consisted of community announcements, weekend public affairs, and weather and traffic inserts during Family Radio's Rise and Rejoice morning show. WFME originated a portion of the network's overnight program Nightwatch, hosted by station manager/chief engineer Charlie Menut. The rest of the station's schedule originated from Family Radio headquarters in Oakland.

WFME's programming was also heard on two translator stations: W213AC (90.5 FM) in Hyde Park, New York; and W247AE (97.3 FM) in East Stroudsburg, Pennsylvania. As a result of WFME's license status change (see below), the translators could no longer legally rebroadcast WFME's broadcast signal; as a result, both translator stations are now carrying a different Family Radio station with a similar feed as of February 2012.

=== Sale to Cumulus Media ===
On January 6, 2012, Family Radio applied to the Federal Communications Commission (FCC) to change the license of WFME from noncommercial to commercial. This move followed the sales by Family Radio of stations in the Philadelphia (WKDN-FM) and Baltimore–Washington (WFSI) markets and quickly prompted conjecture from radio industry monitors that WFME would be sold next. The application was approved on February 7, 2012.

The sale rumors were confirmed on October 16, 2012, when Family Radio announced that it would sell WFME to Atlanta-based Cumulus Media; the originally undisclosed price was later confirmed to be $40 million. In addition, Family Radio acquired Cumulus' WDVY (106.3 FM) in Mount Kisco, New York. The FCC approved the sale/station trade on January 4, 2013, making 94.7 FM a sister station to Cumulus' two existing New York market stations, WABC and WPLJ. Four days later, on January 8, Cumulus completed the purchase of WFME. Family Radio programming on 94.7 FM ended at 3:40 p.m. on January 11; prior to signing off of the frequency, station manager Charlie Menut stated that the network's programming would be transferred to WDVY, which became the new WFME on January 15, and that efforts to acquire an AM frequency that would cover the New York City area were being made. Two years later, in February 2015, Family Radio programming returned to the area via its acquisition of WQEW (1560 AM), a former Radio Disney outlet.

=== "Nash FM" launch ===
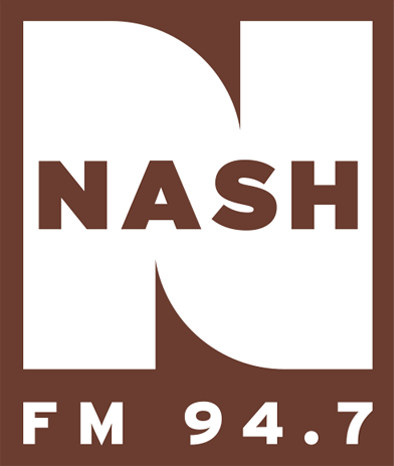
"Nash FM 94.7" logo; this logo styling was also used for stations using the Nash FM and Nash Icon brands operated by previous WNSH owner Cumulus Media.

About twenty minutes after WFME signed off, 94.7 FM, under Cumulus ownership, began a simulcast of WPLJ, which broadcast a hot adult contemporary format. The frequency's call sign was changed three days later to WRXP, a call sign previously used on the 101.9 FM facility in New York City under two different owners and two different stints as an alternative rock station. The WPLJ simulcast ended on January 18, in favor of stunting with "The 94.7 Wheel of Formats". During this stunt, a wide variety of sound clips and songs were played, from formats such as contemporary hit radio and smooth jazz, as well as polka and all-one artist formats like all-Bruce Springsteen and "Weird Al" Yankovic.

The stunting continued until 9:47 a.m. on January 21, when WRXP adopted a new country music format branded as Nash FM 94.7. The first song on "Nash FM" was "How Country Feels" by Randy Houser. The move gave the New York City area its first full-time country station since 2002, when the "Y-107" simulcast of four suburban stations at 107.1 FM cancelled the format. The last station to carry country full-time within the market was WYNY (103.5 FM), which became rhythmic adult contemporary WKTU in 1996. To coincide with the "Nash" launch, Cumulus swapped the WNSH call sign from its sister station in Cambridge, Minnesota (the present-day WLUP), on January 29, 2013.

The station served as the flagship of Nash—an initiative to create a singular multi-platform brand for country music content originated by Cumulus Media, including WNSH and other radio stations (which would either adopt the Nash FM branding themselves, or co-brand with it), Nash Bash concerts, its syndicated country programming (including American Country Countdown, and plans for other content to be distributed by Westwood One), and Nash Magazine.

On November 3, 2014, WELJ (104.7 FM) in Montauk dropped its hot AC format for a simulcast of WNSH, to cover listeners on Eastern Long Island where WNSH's signal did not reach. The simulcast ended on August 31, 2015, when WELJ re-launched as Nash Icon (a country hits format focusing on songs and artists from the 1990s and early 2000s).

In February 2019, WNSH dropped Nash FM's syndicated morning show Ty, Kelly & Chuck in favor of a local show hosted by former Nash network personality Kelly Ford.

=== Sale to Entercom ===
Logo as New York's Country 94.7

On February 13, 2019, Cumulus announced that WNSH would be traded to Entercom, as part of an exchange of WNSH and several stations in Springfield, Massachusetts for Entercom stations in Indianapolis; in the same announcement, Cumulus revealed the separate sale of sister station WPLJ and other outlets to Educational Media Foundation. Entercom assumed control of the station beginning March 1, 2019, under a local marketing agreement; WNSH maintained its country format, although Entercom's head of country stations Tim Roberts stated that the company would be evaluating whether they would continue to license the Nash brand from Cumulus. The swap was finalized on May 9.

On March 25, 2019, WNSH rebranded as New York's Country 94.7, with no change in lineup or programming.

=== 94.7 The Block ===
On October 22, 2021, WNSH announced that the country format was to end later that day; station staff would make similar announcements that it was to be their last day on the station, thanking listeners and sharing station memories throughout the morning with a special extended-length morning show, perhaps not coincidentally a similar sign off to that of WYNY 25 years prior. The station saw calls that morning from various country artists, as well as fellow Audacy New York staffers such as Scott Shannon and Boomer Esiason, giving their station memories and honoring the station, before morning host Kelly Ford, the format's first live DJ in 2013, signed off the show at noon, bookending the live run of the station with the first song played on Nash FM, "How Country Feels" by Randy Houser.

Following the sign off of the show, the station went into an hour of jockless music, ending with Carrie Underwood's "See You Again" and the Nelly remix of "Cruise" by Florida Georgia Line. The station then teased its new format, playing "The Right Stuff" by New Kids on the Block and "Jenny from the Block" by Jennifer Lopez featuring Jadakiss and Styles. Shortly after 1 pm, WNSH flipped to classic hip-hop as "94.7 The Block". The country format moved over to WNSH's HD2 sub-channel shortly thereafter; the previous simulcast of CBS Sports Radio there would then move to WFAN-FM-HD2. The first song under the new format was Jay-Z's "Empire State of Mind" featuring Alicia Keys. New call letters WXBK were applied for on the same day as the flip, and became effective on November 1.

Audacy, Inc. was granted a construction permit to move its transmitter site from First Mountain in West Orange, to the WOR site in Rutherford, New Jersey (which is closer to New York City). The move was completed in October 2022. WMAS-FM also moved its signal directional away from WXBK, without affecting signal in its target area.

== Translators ==
Call sign	Frequency	City of license	FID	ERP (W)	Class	Transmitter coordinates	FCC info	Notes
W252CS	98.3 FM	Palisades Park, New Jersey	155892	120	D	40°50′45.8″N 73°59′6.5″W	LMS	Relays WXBK-HD3
W268BY	101.5 FM	Queens, New York	147810	99	D	40°46′2.3″N 73°57′40.4″W	LMS	Relays WXBK-HD3

== Repeaters ==
Call sign	Frequency	City of license	FID	ERP (W)	Class	Transmitter coordinates	FCC info
WXBK-FM1	94.7 FM	Hempstead, New York	792906	4000	B	40°46′2.3″N 73°57′40.4″W	LMS
WXBK-FM2	94.7 FM	Newark, New Jersey	792906	2500	B	40°44′59.0″N 73°38′17.0″W	LMS
