= WFME (AM) =

Family Radio station licensed to New York City

Operating under special temporary authority
- New York, New York; United States
- Broadcast area: New York metropolitan area
- Frequency: 1560 kHz

Programming
- Language: English
- Format: Christian radio
- Network: Family Radio

Ownership
- Owner: Family Radio; (Loam Media, Inc.)
- Sister stations: WFME-FM; WFRS; WYMK

History
- First air date: March 26, 1929
- Former call signs: W2XR (1929–1936); WQXR (1936–1992); WQEW (1992–2015)
- Former frequencies: 2100 kHz (1929–1934); 1550 kHz (1934–1941)
- Call sign meaning: Where Faith (or Family) Means Everything

Technical information
- Licensing authority: FCC
- Facility ID: 29024
- Class: A
- Power: 50,000 watts
- Transmitter coordinates: 40°50′59.30″N 74°10′57.60″W
- Translators: 106.3 W292FV (New York); 107.9 W300EI (New York)

Links
- Public license information: Public file; LMS
- Webcast: Listen live (via iHeartRadio)

WFME (1560 kHz) is a non-commercial AM radio station licensed to serve New York City. The station is owned by Family Radio, a Christian radio network based in Franklin, Tennessee.

== History ==
WFME traces its origin to an experimental mechanical television station with the call sign W2XR, which was established by inventor John V. L. Hogan, and initially licensed as a "visual broadcasting and experimental" station at 140 Nassau Street in New York City. The station went on the air on March 26, 1929, and broadcast from the Long Island City neighborhood of Queens.

W2XR initially transmitted a video-only signal on 2100 kHz. It later added a companion audio signal, transmitted on 1550 kHz. At the time, the AM broadcast band ended at 1500 kHz, however, some receivers were capable of tuning to the higher frequency being used by W2XR. Hogan was a musical connoisseur, and drew on his record collection to provide the sound for his experiments, which typically lasted for an hour in the evening. Hogan's television broadcasts came to naught, but he began to hear from classical music fans who encouraged him to continue broadcasting music.

On December 19, 1933, the Federal Radio Commission (FRC) authorized three new broadcasting frequencies, between 1500 and 1600 kHz, for high-fidelity operation. These new 20 kHz-wide channels were twice as wide as the standard AM broadcasting channels. Six applications were submitted to the FRC, including one for 1550 kHz in Long Island City from Hogan. Hogan's application was one of the four approved in April–the other stations, granted on the same day, were W1XBS in Waterbury, Connecticut, and W9XBY in Kansas City, Missouri, both on 1530 kHz, and W6XAI in Bakersfield, California, which shared 1550 kHz with W2XR. Although licensed as experimental stations, they were authorized to conduct commercial operations. Hogan's station, retaining the W2XR call sign, was licensed as an "experimental broadcast station" on June 29, 1934.

In 1936, Elliott Sanger joined Hogan and formed the Interstate Broadcasting Company, with the intention of operating commercially, at a time when there were already about 25 radio stations in New York. The station was branded as the "Good Music" station, and primarily broadcast classical music. The transmitter, which used a homemade antenna mounted on a wooden pole, was located in a garage in Long Island City, near the Queensborough Bridge. Its 250 watts provided just enough power to reach Midtown Manhattan and parts of Queens. In November 1936 the FCC ruled that the high-fidelity stations could adopt conventional call letters, and W2XR became WQXR, which was chosen because "Q" was phonetically similar to "2", and, when written in script, capital "Q" and "2" have a similar appearance.

An FM service, W2XQR, later 96.3 WQXR-FM, was added in 1939. The North American Regional Broadcasting Agreement (NARBA) in March 1941 formally extended the AM band to 1600 kHz. That ended the experimental AM "high-fidelity" service, but all four original stations were kept near their existing frequencies. WQXR was originally slated to move to 1600 kHz as a 5,000-watt Class III-A regional station, but management was able to persuade the FCC to make it a class I-B station on 1560 kHz instead, eventually transmitting with the maximum for AM stations: 50,000 watts.

=== "The radio station of The New York Times" (1944–1998) ===
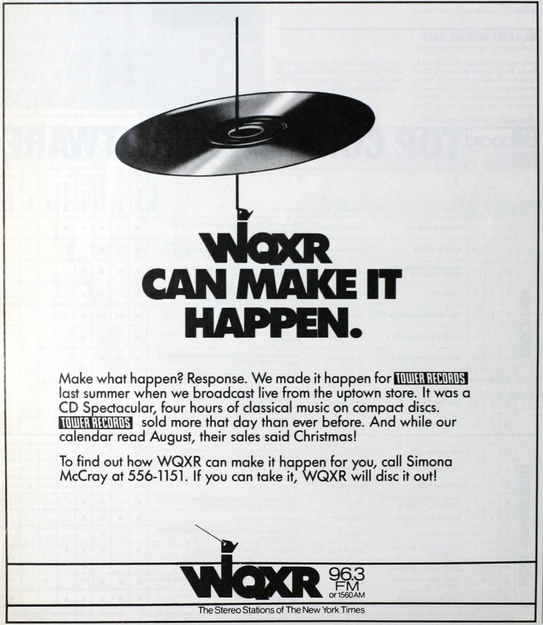
A 1986 advertisement with older logo of WQXR displaying both FM and AM frequencies

The New York Post approached the company in the early 1940s about purchasing the stations. Sanger said publicly that he would have preferred to sell to The New York Times, and in early 1944, the Times agreed to pay just over $1 million for ownership of Interstate Broadcasting Company. A transfer application was filed with the FCC on March 1, 1944, including a financial statement showing that the stations had made over $22,000 in profits the previous year, on revenues of $411,000; after FCC approval, the sale was completed on July 25, 1944. (The Times continued to operate its radio stations under the Interstate Broadcasting name for many years, maintaining what its president called "basic good-music policies," but later used the name The New York Times Radio Company.) It broadcast classical music full-time, along with New York Times news. At 9 pm, the newspaper having been "put to bed", the station would broadcast a brief discussion of the news which would appear on the front page of the next day's issue.

WQXR was the first AM station in New York to experiment with broadcasting in stereo, beginning in 1952. During some of its live concerts, it used two microphones positioned six feet apart. The microphone on the right led to its AM feed, and the one on the left to its FM feed, so a listener could position two radios six feet apart, one tuned to 1560 and the other to 96.3, and listen in stereo.

In 1964, there was controversy when its 11 p.m. program "Nightcap" was sponsored by Schenley Liquors. Advertising hard liquor was considered a violation of the voluntary NAB standards.

In 1965, the FCC began requiring commonly owned AM and FM stations in large markets to broadcast separate programming for at least part of the day. WQXR-FM concentrated on longer classical works, while WQXR (AM) aired lighter classical music and talk programs produced in conjunction with The New York Times. While this plan gave classical music fans in the New York area two options, it also increased expenses for the stations.

In 1971, the Times put WQXR-AM-FM up for sale. Many offers were received for the FM station, but none of the bids for 1560 AM were satisfactory to management. When the FCC agreed to waive rules prohibiting stations from simulcasting if they were broadcasting classical music, the Times took the WQXR stations off the market. Simulcasting was also allowed, for example, for WGMS and WGMS-FM in Washington.

==== Transition to WQEW ====
On December 2, 1992, the AM side broke away from the simulcast for good, changing to an American popular standards format, and the station began broadcasting in AM stereo using the C-QUAM system, which was inaugurated by a live studio performance by Tony Bennett. The change came a few months after WNEW (1130 AM), New York's heritage popular standards station, announced an impending sale to Bloomberg L.P. and a format switch to business information with the new callsign WBBR. The format change at 1560 to standards happened 10 days before WNEW's transition. To reflect the heritage of both outlets, WQXR (AM) changed its call sign to WQEW. The station focused on a broad range of pop standards–the format's foundation artists including Frank Sinatra, Nat "King" Cole, Ella Fitzgerald, Dean Martin and Perry Como, but also artists from the big band era (such as Tommy Dorsey, Artie Shaw, Glenn Miller, Louis Armstrong and Duke Ellington); and non-rock-and-roll pop hits (by artists like Neil Diamond, Barbra Streisand, Ray Charles, Bobby Darin and Pat Boone, among others). Light rock and roll material such as the Turtles was also occasionally heard.

=== Radio Disney (1998–2015) ===
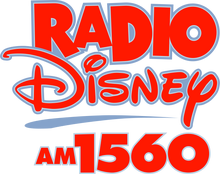
WQEW former logo used from 2002 until 2007.

Although initially successful, the station's advertising revenues were not spectacular, and older audience demographics were deemed undesirable for long-term success. On December 1, 1998, the Times announced that WQEW would switch to Radio Disney after agreeing to what was initially an eight-year local marketing agreement term with the Walt Disney Company and its ABC Radio subsidiary. The entire WQEW air staff, under orders to not discuss the pending changes on the air, was released on December 21; the station played Christmas music without announcers through the holiday. Regular programming resumed on December 26, and ended on December 27, at 11:59 pm, when a pre-recorded signoff read by program director and air personality Stan Martin was played. Radio Disney programming launched on WQEW on December 28, at midnight, and the station stopped broadcasting in AM stereo.

At the end of the agreement with the Times in late 2006, Disney had the option to purchase the station or to extend the arrangement with the Times maintaining ownership. Disney exercised the option to purchase in early January 2007. Disney/ABC officially became the owner of the station on May 24.

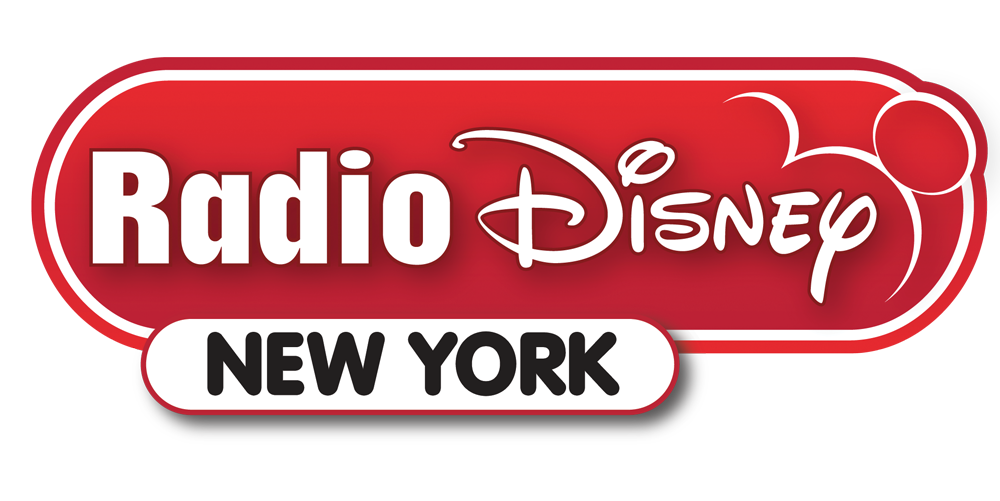
Final Radio Disney logo for WQEW.

On August 13, 2014, Disney announced its intention to end terrestrial distribution of the Radio Disney format, to focus on digital distribution. Disney would also sell its remaining Radio Disney broadcast outlets, including WQEW and with the lone exception of KDIS in Los Angeles. Disney set a deadline of September 26, to complete the sales or have deals in principle set or the stations in question, including WQEW, would fall silent. However, Disney backtracked and the stations would remain on the air, continuing to broadcast Radio Disney programming until each were sold.

=== Family Radio (2015–present) ===
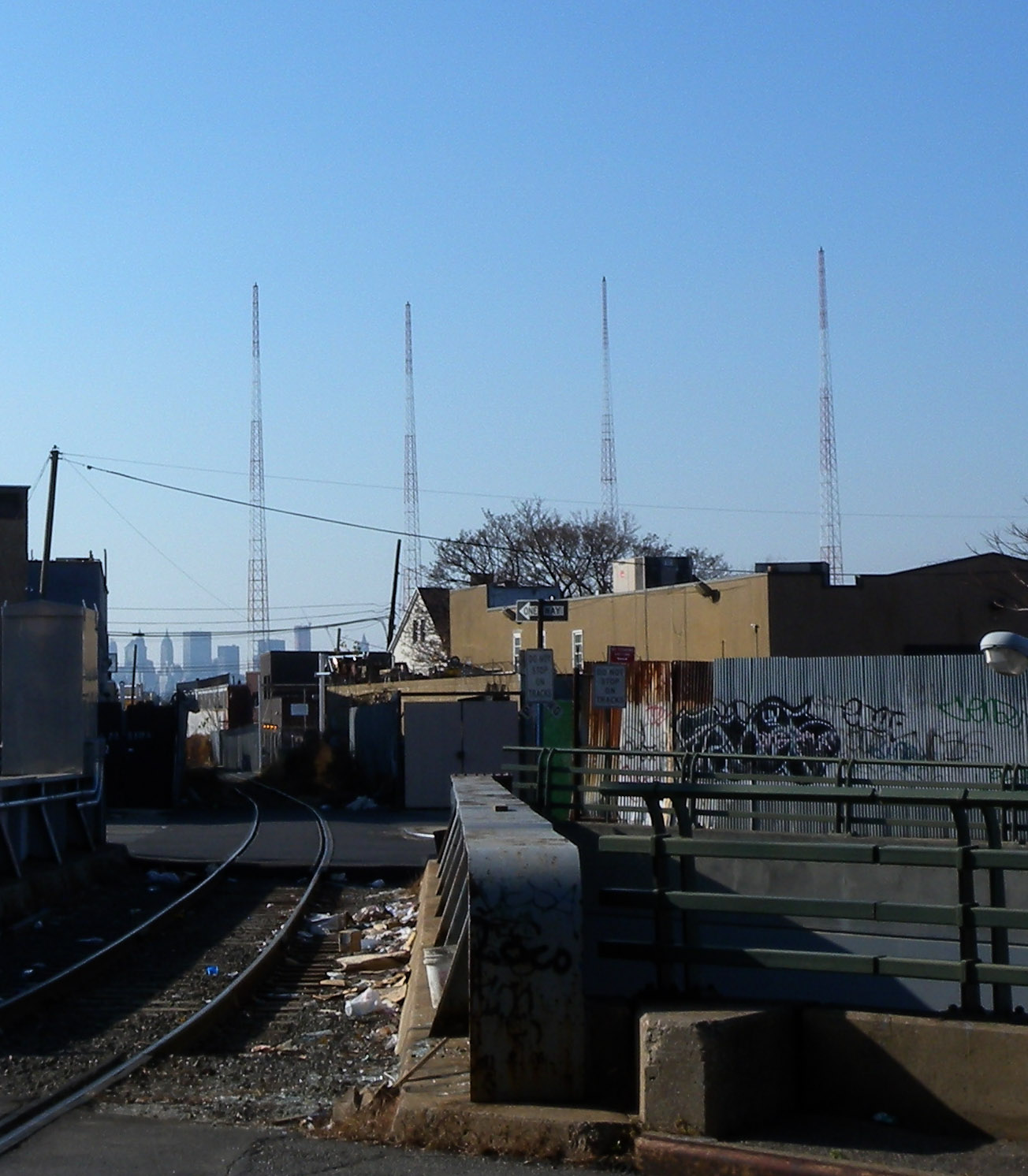
The former WFME broadcast towers in Maspeth, Queens.

On November 21, then-Oakland, California-based Family Stations announced it would purchase WQEW from Disney/ABC for $12.95 million. The transaction had been rumored for at least a month, as it was originally reported by the New York Daily News on October 14; however, Disney had clarified that it had not yet agreed to the sale. In January 2013, Family Radio sold the original, Newark, New Jersey-licensed WFME (94.7 FM, which it had owned since 1966, but had been programming since 1963) to Cumulus Media, who converted the station into country music-formatted WNSH. In what amounted to a station trade-plus-cash transaction, Family Stations also acquired the license for WDVY (106.3 FM) in Mount Kisco, New York. The 106.3 FM signal, combined in tandem with Family Radio-owned WFRH (91.7 FM) in Kingston, New York mainly serves the Hudson Valley region; another Family Radio outlet, WFRS (88.9 FM) in Smithtown, New York serves Long Island. This left Family Radio programming unavailable over-the-air in New York City proper and northern New Jersey (including Newark) for over two years.

After the FCC approved the sale on February 10, 2015, 1560 AM went silent on February 17, in preparation of the format change. The sale was finalized on February 20, and the call sign was changed to WFME. The station returned to the air on February 27, again giving Family Radio full coverage of the New York City market. Concurrent with the sale, the FCC converted 1560 AM's broadcast license status from commercial to non-commercial educational.

The entirety of the station's schedule originated from Family Radio headquarters (which in 2016 moved from Oakland to nearby Alameda, California), although WFME did carry local programming to comply with the FCC's public affairs requirements.

In late November 2020, Family Radio announced the sale of the property surrounding WFME's broadcast towers in Queens, but stipulated that the terms included that Family Radio would still use this site until a suitable alternate location for the transmitter was found. However, in early 2021, it ended regular programming and began broadcasting a recurring announcement that the station would suspend operations "in just a few days". Although Family Radio officials expressed a desire to eventually return to the New York airwaves, they noted that there were no immediate plans; listeners were directed to access either WFRS in Smithtown and WFME-FM in Mount Kisco, in addition to the Family Radio webstream. In much of central and southern New Jersey, Family Radio programming could also be heard on WKDN (950 AM) in Philadelphia.

WFME went temporarily silent on the morning of February 15, 2021. On October 26, 2021, the station returned to the air from a new transmitter site in West Orange, New Jersey, operating with 1,000 watts under special temporary authority (STA), granted by the Federal Communications Commission (FCC). Due to blanketing interference, the station later reduced power to 500 watts.

On March 4, 2024, WFME ceased operations and went silent following interference complaints from the nearby Goddard School and the sale to Goddard School of the building housing their transmitter and tower. On September 16, 2024, the FCC approved an STA to resume operations with 10 kW non-directional, from a New Jersey site located approximately 25 km [15 miles] away, shared with stations WPAT and WNSW. It resumed broadcasting from this site, initially with 1 kW, on October 18, 2024. On March 17, 2025, the FCC granted an extension to the STA, until September 16, 2025, which was further extended to March 15, 2026, and September 6, 2026.

== See also ==
- W2XCR
- WQXR-FM
- List of experimental television stations

== Bibliography ==
- Jaker, Bill; Frank Sulek; Peter Kanze (1998). The Airwaves of New York: Illustrated Histories of 156 AM Stations in the Metropolitan Area, 1921–1996. Jefferson, North Carolina: McFarland and Company. pp. 169–172. ISBN 0-7864-0343-8. LCC TK6548.U6J35.
- Sanger, Elliot (1973). Rebel in Radio: The Story of WQXR. New York City: Hastings House. ISBN 0-240-50845-9. LCC HE8698.S33, paperback.
