= WYMK =

Family Radio station in Mount Kisco, New York, United States

- Mount Kisco, New York; United States
- Broadcast area: Westchester, Putnam and Rockland counties
- Frequency: 106.3 MHz

Ownership
- Owner: Family Radio; (Loam Media, Inc.)
- Sister stations: WFME; WFME-FM; WFRS

History
- First air date: January 15, 1964
- Former call signs: WVIP-FM (1964–1993); WMJU (1993–1995); WVIB (1995–1996); WZZN (1996–1999); WFAF (1999–2012); WDVY (2012–2013); WFME (2013–2014); WFME-FM (2014–2022)

Technical information
- Licensing authority: FCC
- Facility ID: 70274
- Class: A
- ERP: 980 watts
- HAAT: 135.1 meters (443 ft)
- Transmitter coordinates: 41°11′9.3″N 73°40′39.4″W

Links
- Public license information: Public file; LMS

WYMK (106.3 FM) is a non-commercial radio station licensed to Mount Kisco, New York, and serving Westchester, Putnam and Rockland counties. The station is owned by Family Radio, based in Franklin, Tennessee.

WYMK is a Class A FM station with an effective radiated power (ERP) of 980 watts. Its transmitter is in Bedford, New York, near Interstate 684.

== History ==
The station signed on the air on January 15, 1964, as WVIP-FM, the sister station to WVIP (1310 AM). In their early years, WVIP and WVIP-FM were mostly simulcast, although by the 1980s, WVIP-FM had a separate adult contemporary format.

On September 26, 1993, the station was sold and changed its call sign to WMJU, and on November 11, 1999 to WFAF.

Previously the station had been simulcasting WFAS-FM 103.9, an adult contemporary station with studios in Hartsdale and was licensed to Bronxville. It was announced on February 25, 2012, that WFAF would begin simulcasting country music station WDBY ("KICKS 105.5 FM") from Patterson, New York, starting on Thursday, March 1. The switch was moved up to February 29, 2012, at noon. To reflect the format change, Cumulus Media changed the call sign from WFAF to WDVY.

WDVY was sold to Family Radio as part of the agreement to sell long-time Family Radio station 94.7 WFME in Newark, New Jersey, to Cumulus Media. The WDBY simulcast went silent on Monday, January 14, 2013, in preparation for Family Radio, the previous programming from 94.7, to move there along with the WFME call letters. The station began playing traditional Christian hymns that afternoon and the full Family Radio feed on Tuesday, January 15, 2013.

After Family Radio acquired WQBU-FM 92.7 on January 20, 2022, the group moved the WFME-FM call sign to the new station on January 26. Meanwhile, 106.3's call sign was changed to WYMK.
