= KEAR (AM) =

Family Radio flagship station in San Francisco

- San Francisco, California; United States
- Broadcast area: San Francisco Bay Area
- Frequency: 610 kHz
- Branding: Family Radio

Programming
- Language: English
- Format: Christian radio
- Network: Family Radio

Ownership
- Owner: Family Radio; (Loam Media, Inc.)

History
- First air date: September 24, 1924
- Former call signs: KFRC (1924–2005)
- Call sign meaning: The human ear; the original KEAR was the station on which Family Radio began broadcasting in 1959

Technical information
- Licensing authority: FCC
- Facility ID: 1082
- Class: B
- Power: 5,000 watts
- Transmitter coordinates: 37°50′57.73″N 122°17′47.89″W

Links
- Public license information: Public file; LMS
- Webcast: Listen live
- Website: familyradio.org

KEAR (610 AM) is a non-commercial Christian radio station licensed to San Francisco, California, United States, and is the flagship station of the Family Radio network. KEAR's transmitter facilities are diplexed at the KVTO tower located in Berkeley, California. Until 2005, KEAR was broadcasting on 106.9 FM. The station's format contains Christian music as well as Calvinist religious teaching.

== History ==
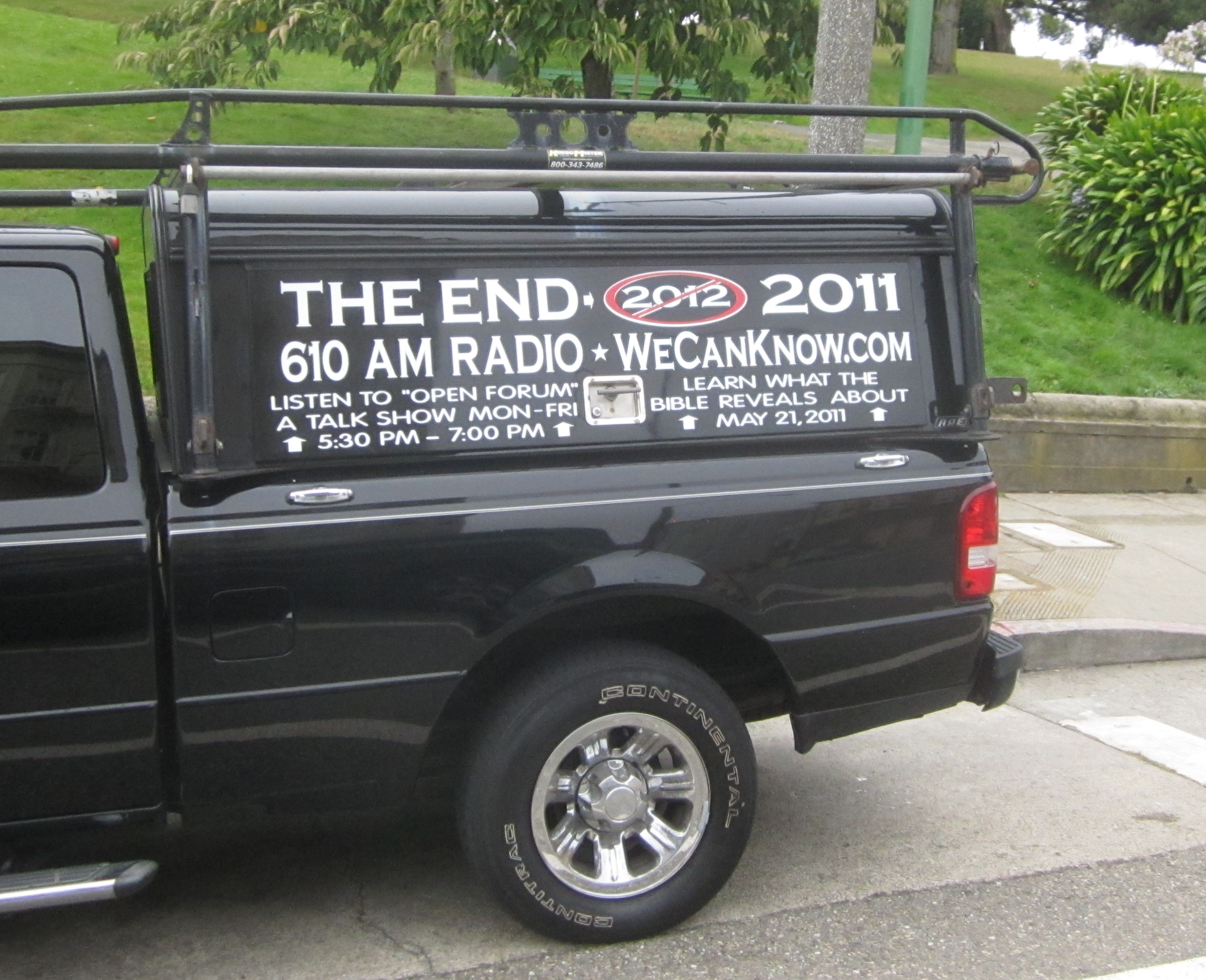
A vehicle advertising the network's 2011 end-times predictions and KEAR

=== 610 AM KFRC ===
The frequency of 610 kHz had been home to the original KFRC for over eight decades, from September 24, 1924 until April 29, 2005. In the 1960s and 1970s, KFRC was a legendary Top 40 rock-music station in San Francisco, but on August 11, 1986, KFRC had changed to an Adult Standards format. On August 12, 1993, it began simulcasting its sister station KFRC-FM's Oldies format.

=== KEAR call letters ===
The call letters KEAR were first adopted in the Bay Area by an AM station at 1550 kHz in San Mateo—the former KSMO (now KZDG)—on January 1, 1952. The station, which signed on in 1947, was the first classical music station in San Francisco. When KEAR stopped broadcasting classical music in 1956—as the result of financial difficulties—many San Francisco classical music lovers needed to become early adopters and purchase recently introduced FM radios so they could listen to classical music broadcasts on KDFC or on KEAR's co-owned FM station, formerly KXKX; the KEAR call letters moved from AM to FM when the AM station was sold. Family Stations Inc. bought the station in 1959, and aired its first Family Radio broadcast on KEAR on February 4 of that year.

In September 1978, Family Stations Inc. sold its station at 97.3 to CBS (becoming KCBS-FM, and subsequently KLLC), and acquired KMPX (106.9 FM) from National Science Network, Inc. At this time, the KEAR call letters and Family Radio programming were transferred to the new frequency, where it broadcast for 27 years.

=== KEAR moves to 610 AM ===
In 2005, Family Stations acquired KFRC's AM frequency from Infinity Broadcasting. Viacom, the parent company of Infinity Broadcasting, was in the process of acquiring television station KOVR in Stockton, California, and needed to sell the AM station to meet Federal Communications Commission ownership limitations. KFRC's city-grade signal easily reached Sacramento, and the FCC required Viacom to sell either a Sacramento station or a Bay Area station that could be heard at city-grade strength in Sacramento. On April 29, 2005, 610 AM began simulcasting Family Radio programming. Shortly thereafter, Family Stations sold its 106.9 FM frequency to Infinity Broadcasting.

The Oakland Athletics baseball team, which had a contract with KFRC to carry its games, continued to broadcast on 610 AM through the end of the team's 2005 season. On October 17, 2005, after the season ended, the KEAR call letters were transferred to the AM station and 106.9 became KIFR, later to become KFRC-FM.
