= Shortwave broadcasting in the United States =

Shortwave broadcasting in the United States includes privately owned stations as well as federal government broadcasters. Many privately owned shortwave stations are religious and some stations also carry relay programming from foreign broadcasters. Under Federal Communications Commission rules, an international broadcast station uses frequencies between 5950 and 26100 kHz and is intended to be received directly by the general public in foreign countries rather than to serve only a domestic audience in the continental United States. Such stations may carry commercial or sponsored programs and may also transmit the programming of an AM station or network system under FCC rules, but they may not operate solely for an audience in the continental United States. International broadcast stations in the United States are also subject to minimum power and directional-antenna requirements.

Supporters of shortwave broadcasting have argued that it remains useful for reaching audiences in places where governments restrict access to independent media.

== History ==
The use of shortwave transmission by US broadcasters began in the 1920s by early broadcast networks as a way to transmit programming between stations, as an alternative to leasing expensive long-distance lines. Westinghouse simulcast the programs of KDKA in Pittsburgh on shortwave in order to relay them more cheaply to sister stations KDPM in Cleveland and WBZ in East Springfield, Massachusetts.

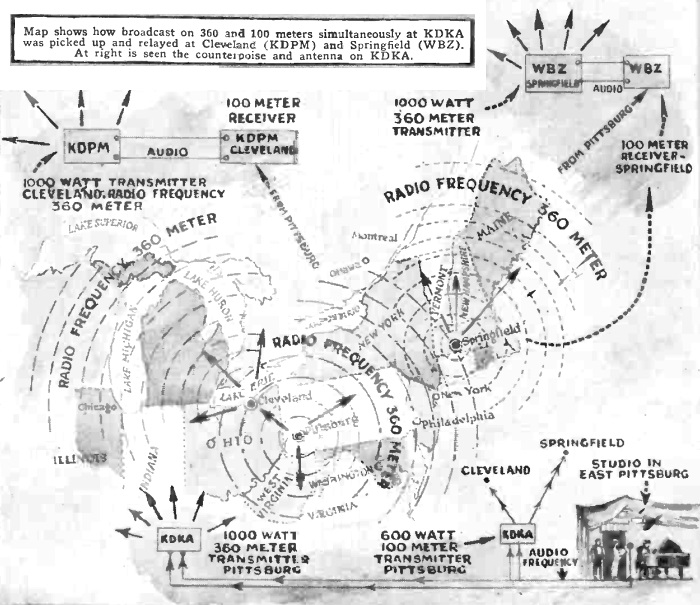
Diagram of shortwave links used by KDKA in East Pittsburgh for rebroadcasts by KDPM in Cleveland and WBZ East Springfield, Massachusetts (1923)

Westinghouse soon decided to move its relay target to the geographical center of the United States, and switched to a newly constructed station, KFKX in Hastings, Nebraska, beginning on November 22, 1923, which ended the relay transmissions to KDPM. Ultimately shortwave relays for network programming was determined to be inferior to dedicated telephone line connections, and the transmissions to KFKX ended, with the Hastings operation closing on June 1, 1927.

In 1922, a 1 kW shortwave transmitter was installed at Westinghouse's factory in East Pittsburgh, Pennsylvania, with call sign 8XS. This was joined by 8XAU in 1924, which, after the original 8XK was deleted later that year, changed its call sign to the historically significant 8XK, and then W8XK in 1929, with its transmitter power increasing to 40 kW by 1937.

The transmissions by W8XK were eventually expanded into an international service conducted independently of KDKA.

From 1923 to 1940, KDKA produced The Northern Messenger, airing it over its shortwave radio sister station 8XS (later known as W8XK and WPIT). The program was broadcast over shortwave to the Far North during the winter months, when mail service was impossible, and consisted of personal messages to RCMP officers, missionaries, trappers, and others from family and friends, music, and news.

RCA was also a pioneer in shortwave broadcasting in the US. RCA began to transmit transatlantic radio messages over longwave from its Radio Central facility at Rocky Point, New York after its opening on November 5, 1921. In 1923, Radio Central began experimenting with shortwave with regular use beginning in 1924. By 1928, RCA had scrapped plans for more longwave transmitters and instead built six shortwave transmitters, 2XT and WTT at 40 kw and WBU, WIK, WQO and WLL at 20 kw. The Radio Central complex was used to relay international broadcast programming received by, or sent from, RCA's broadcast stations in the United States. The facility remained in use until the 1970s when it was superseded by satellite transmission.

In 1924, General Electric began relaying WGY over shortwave transmitters W2XAF and W2XAD (later called WGEO and WGEA) at their Schenectady, New York plant and Crosley Broadcasting Corporation obtained a license to relay the programming of WLW over shortwave transmitter, W8XAL (later WLWO). RCA and NBC began relaying WJZ over a shortwave transmitter in Bound Brook, New Jersey in 1925 and in 1928 CBS relayed WABC programming over shortwave station W2XE in Wayne, New Jersey.

Commercial broadcasting was not allowed on shortwave until 1939. The "NBC White Network", NBC's chain of shortwave stations, aggressively sought broadcasting for the White Network which served as NBC's international network broadcast in six languages, with a focus on transmissions to Central and South America in Spanish. CBS used shortwave to support its Latin American international network, which consisted of 64 stations located in 18 countries and GE's KGEI opened in San Francisco in 1939, transmitting to Asia.

On November 1, 1942, all 14 private U.S. shortwave stations ended commercial operations and were leased to the Voice of America. All the takeovers were friendly except for WRUL which was seized by the government. The stations continued to be owned privately and after the war all owners were given the option to resume control of their stations but only the owners of WRUL exercised that option, though they were not given full control until 1954. NBC and CBS provided programming to the government under contract until 1948 when they left shortwave broadcasting.

During World War II, the facilities of San Francisco radio station KSFO were also used for international shortwave broadcasting. At the request of President Franklin D. Roosevelt, KSFO owner Wesley I. Dumm established shortwave stations KWID and KWIX to transmit programming overseas, including broadcasts intended for American troops. The stations began broadcasting within five weeks of the December 1941 attack on Pearl Harbor and were among the early U.S. international broadcasting operations that preceded the Voice of America and Armed Forces Radio.

== Non-religious private broadcasters ==
While many private shortwave broadcasters in the United States are operated by religious groups or carry mostly religious programming, there have also been attempts at starting non-religious shortwave stations.

Two such stations were WRNO in New Orleans and KUSW in Salt Lake City, both of them with a rock and roll music format. Both stations were well received by shortwave listeners, but could not make the format successful in the long run. KUSW was eventually sold to the Trinity Broadcasting Network and converted into religious broadcaster KTBN. WRNO kept its rock and roll format going for most of the 1980s but eventually switched formats to selling brokered airtime to political and religious broadcasts, suffered a damaged transmitter, and eventually ceased broadcasting following the death of its owner, Joe Costello. WRNO was acquired by Robert Mawire and Good News World Outreach in 2001. After installing a new transmitter, the station was within just days of returning to the air when Hurricane Katrina struck on August 29, 2005. The new transmitter was spared from flood waters, but the antenna was severely damaged by high winds. WRNO finally returned to broadcasting in 2009, operating four hours per day. On March 13, 2010, WRNO began transmitting a weekly religious broadcast in Arabic for a portion of its broadcast schedule.

A notable exception is WBCQ, a non-religious private station operated by Allan Weiner in Maine. WBCQ has been a success by brokering much of their airtime to fringe cults like Brother Stair and World's Last Chance, while also carrying some music and entertainment programs. WTWW primarily operated as an oldies station targeted at amateur radio and DXing audiences, along with a country music feed targeting eastern Europe; the station leased out one of its channels to LaPorte Church of Christ mainly to subsidize the other channels. WTWW went out of business November 9, 2022 and moved most of its programming to WRMI, one of the nation's largest shortwave broadcasters, with LaPorte fully taking over and relaunching WTWW a month later.

Other private shortwave stations that air a mix of religious and non-religious programs include WRMI (which also relays several International broadcast services), and WWCR.

== Pirate radio ==
Numerous pirate radio stations have operated sporadically in or just outside the shortwave broadcast bands. Most are operated by hobbyists for the amusement of DX'ers with broadcasts typically only a few hours in length.

Few American pirates are political or controversial in their programming. Pirates have tended to cluster in unofficial "pirate bands" based on the current schedules of licensed shortwave stations and the retuning of amateur radio transmitters to operate outside the "ham" radio bands.

Most pirate activity takes place on weekends or holidays, Halloween and April Fool's Day being traditional favorites of pirates. Most broadcasts are only a few minutes to a few hours at a time. One notable exception was Radio Newyork International, a short-lived attempt to establish a permanent broadcasting station operating from international waters.

Some European nations have recently begun allowing privately owned shortwave stations on a far more limited scale.

== Notable personalities ==
=== Notable Preachers/Religious broadcasters ===
- Tony Alamo
- Mother Angelica - founder of WEWN
- Harold Camping
- Texe Marrs
- Jacob O. Meyer (OBM)
- Gene Scott
- Melissa Scott (replaced Gene Scott)
- Brother Stair
- Peter J. Peters

=== Commentators ===
- Jack Anderson – was heard on AFRTS Radio in the 1980s
- Art Bell – via a Canadian affiliate's 49-meter shortwave relay service and WFLA's 11-meter relay. Also a ham radio operator (deceased)
- Willis Conover
- William Cooper
- Mort Crim
- Chuck Harder
- Paul Harvey – Paul Harvey News & Commentary/Rest of the Story was carried on AFRTS Radio
- Glenn Hauser – World of Radio
- Marie Lamb – DXing With Cumbre
- Rush Limbaugh – his show was carried on WRNO-Worldwide in the 1990s
- Stan Monteith
- The Report Of The Week – YouTube Food Critic, hosts Voice of the Report of the Week
- Jay Smilkstein – WBCQ
- John Stadtmiller on WWCR – notorious for setting up Mark Koernke
- Hal Turner on WBCQ - The Hal Turner Radio Show
- John from Staten Island & Frank from Queens – hosting "The Right Perspective" on WWCR

== Shortwave stations ==
=== Government broadcasters (US) ===
- Voice of America worldwide news service
- Radio Free Europe/Radio Liberty targeting Europe and Asia
- Radio Free Asia targeting Asia
- Radio Sawa targeting the Middle East
- Radio Farda targeting Iran
- Radio Martí targeting Cuba
- WWV/WWVH time stations from the National Institute of Standards and Technology
- American Forces Network focused on the U.S. military

=== Current privately owned US broadcasters ===
- KNLS – World Christian Broadcasting – Anchor Point, Alaska
- KSDA – Adventist World Radio – Agat, Guam
- KTWR – Trans World Radio – Agana, Guam
- WBCQ – "The Planet" – Monticello, Maine
- WINB – "World International Broadcasting" – Red Lion, Pennsylvania
- WJHR – Milton, Florida (unique for broadcasting in Upper Side Band modulation)
- WMLK – Assemblies of Yahweh – Bethel, Pennsylvania
- WRMI – "Radio Miami International" – Okeechobee, Florida
- WTWW – "We Transmit World Wide" – Lebanon, Tennessee
- WWCR – "Worldwide Christian Radio" – Nashville, Tennessee
- WRNO – "WRNOradio.com" – New Orleans, Louisiana

=== Defunct broadcasters ===
- KAIJ – Dallas, Texas
- KFBS – Far East Broadcasting Company – Saipan, Northern Mariana Islands
- KGEI – San Francisco, California (studios and transmitter in Redwood City, California)
- KWID and KWIX – San Francisco, California – shortwave stations established by KSFO owner Wesley I. Dumm during World War II to transmit programming overseas; they began broadcasting within five weeks of the attack on Pearl Harbor and were predecessors of later U.S. government international broadcasting services.
- KHBN – High Adventure Ministries Piti, Guam (now T8BZ in Palau)
- KHBI – Saipan, Northern Mariana Islands (Formerly KYOI)
- KIMF – Pinon, New Mexico (licensed, but never built)
- KJES – "The Lord's Station" – Vado, New Mexico
- KRHO – Honolulu, Hawaii
- KSAI – Saipan, Northern Mariana Islands
- KTBN – Trinity Broadcasting Network – Salt Lake City, Utah
- KUSW – "Superpower" – Salt Lake City, Utah (station sold, and became KTBN)
- KVOH – "Voice of Hope" – Rancho Simi, California
- KWHR – "World Harvest Radio" – Naalehu, Hawaii
- KYOI – Saipan (1982-1989) "Super Rock" commercial station, later KHBI
- NDXE – (never built)
- WCSN – Maine -Operated by the Christian Science Monitor
- WEWN – "Eternal Word Network" – Irondale, Alabama
- WGEO - Schenectady, NY - originally owned and operated by General Electric, acquired by Voice of America during World War II
- WGTG – McCaysville, Georgia
- WHRA – "World Harvest Radio" – Greenbush, Maine (sold to WBCQ
- WJIE – Evangel World Prayer Center – Louisville, Kentucky
- WNRI: Bound Brook, New Jersey owned by NBC
- WNYW – "Radio New York Worldwide" – Scituate, Massachusetts
- WSHB – Furman, South Carolina
- WYFR – Family Stations. Inc. – Okeechobee, Florida
- WWBS – Macon, Georgia
- Radio Newyork International – Pirate radio station operating from international waters
- WVOH and WTJC – Fundamental Broadcasting Network – Newport, North Carolina
- W8XK - sister station of KDKA (AM) Pittsburgh. Founded in 1920 as 8XK, later known as later known as 8XS (1921-1929), W8XK (1929-1939) and then WPIT until 1940 when it was merged with WBOS Boston, simulcasting WBZ, and then transmitting Voice of America to Europe and Africa for 12 years, before being dismantled.
- WWRB – Manchester, Tennessee (successor to WGTG and WWFV)

=== New stations ===
- KTMI – Lebanon, Oregon – not yet on the air, construction permit
