= List of shortwave radio broadcasters =

This is a list of shortwave radio broadcasters updated on 31 October 2026:

== By country ==
State	Broadcaster	First shortwave broadcast	Last shortwave broadcast	Currently broadcasting on SW	Currently broadcasting online	Notes
Afghanistan	Radio Kabul	2011	2020	No	No	
Albania	Radio Tirana	1937	2022	No	Yes	Relayed by Radio Miami International (WRMI) from 2017-2022. Online as Radio Tirana International.
Algeria	Radio Algérienne	1962		Yes	Yes	
Angola	Rádio Nacional de Angola	1979	2022	No	Yes	
Argentina	Radiodifusión Argentina al Exterior	1949		Yes	No	Relayed by Radio Miami International (WRMI)
Argentina	Radio Nacional Arcángel San Gabriel	1979		Yes		
Armenia	Public Radio of Armenia	1926	2018	No	Yes	
Australia	Radio Australia	1939	2017	No	Yes	Operated by the public Australian Broadcasting Corporation. Continues online as ABC Radio Australia/ABC Pacific
Australia	2FC	1925?	1930?	No	No	
Australia	3LO	1925?	1930?	No	No	
Australia	4QG	1925?	1930?	No	No	
Australia	6WF	1925	1929	No	No	Transmissions of shortwave parallel ceased Sep 1929 when ABC/PMG assumed control
Australia	VLR	1925?	1930?	No	No	
Australia	VK2ME	1925?	1930?	No	No	
Australia	VK3ME	1925?	1930?	No	No	
Australia	VK6ME	1925?	1930?	No	No	
Australia	Reach Beyond Australia	2003		Yes	No	Religious broadcaster. Based in Kilsyth, Victoria
Australia	Radio Hobart International	2004		Yes	No	Based in Hobart, Tasmania. Relayed via WBCQ and New Zealand FM stations.
Australia	North Queensland Radio	2017		Yes	No	Based in Innisfail, Queensland.
Australia	Shortwave Australia	2022		Yes	No	Based in Bendigo, Victoria.
Australia	77400 FM	2017	2018	No		Based in Alice Springs, Northern Territory.
Australia	Ozy Radio	2017	2018	No		Based in Perth, Western Australia.
Australia	Radio Symban	2008	2018	No		Based in Sydney, New South Wales.
Australia	Genesis Radio	2016	2018	No		Based in Sydney, New South Wales.
Australia	Station X	2016	2018	No		Based in Wee Waa, New South Wales.
Australia	Unique Radio	2016	2018	No		Based in Gunnedah, New South Wales. Relays via WINB.
Austria	Radio Austria International	1955	2003	No	No	
Austria	Ö1 International	2003	2024	No	No	Foreign-language services discontinued, German-language only streams of domestic channels
Azerbaijan	İctimai Radio	2006	2018	No	No	
Azerbaijan	Voice of Justice	1997		No		
Azerbaijan	Voice of Talyshistan	2013		No		
Bahrain	Radio Bahrain	1971	2019	No		
Bangladesh	Bangladesh Betar	1939	2024	No		Temporary shutdown due to a technical issue
Belarus	Radio Belarus	1962	2016	No	Yes	International service in 9 languages available online, via satellite and on FM border stations.
| Belgium	RTBF International	2004	2009	No	No	
| Belgium	Radio Vlaanderen Internationaal		2009	No	No	
| Belgium	Dengê Gel	2001	2026	No	No	Earlier known under names Dengê Mezopotamya, Dengê Kurdistan and Dengê Welat.
Benin	Radiodiffusion et télévision du Bénin	1972	2009	No		
Bhutan	Bhutan Broadcasting Service	1991	2020	No		Last Heard in November 2020
Bolivia	Radio Mosoj Chaski	1999		Yes		Based in Cochabamba.
Bolivia	Radio Santa Ana del Yacuma	1999		Yes		Based in Santa Ana del Yacuma, Beni Department.
Bolivia	Radio San Miguel	?		Yes		Based in Riberalta, Beni Department.
Bolivia	Radio Eco	?		Yes		Based in Reyes, Beni Department.
Bolivia	Radio Fides	?		Yes		Based in La Paz.
Bolivia	Radio Panamericana	1972		Yes		Based in La Paz.
Bolivia	Radio Patria Nueva	?		Yes		Based in La Paz.
Bolivia	Radio Pio XII	?		Yes		Based in Siglo Veinte, Oruro Department.
Bolivia	Radio Yura	2000		Yes		Based in Yura, Potosi Department.
Bolivia	Radio Santa Cruz	1975		Yes		Based in Santa Cruz, Santa Cruz Department.
Botswana	Radio Botswana	1965	2007	No		
Brazil	Rádio Nacional da Amazônia	1977		Yes		Based in Brasília, Distrito Federal. Operated by the public EBC. Targeted to the population of Brazilian Amazon.
Brazil	Radio Integração	?		Yes		Broadcast from Cruzeiro do Sul, Acre.
Brazil	Radio Verdes Florestas	?		Yes		Broadcast from Cruzeiro do Sul, Acre.
Brazil	Rádio Difusora do Amazonas	1948		Yes		Broadcast from Manaus, Amazonas.
Brazil	Rádio Rio Mar	1954	2017	No		Broadcast from Manaus, Amazonas.
Brazil	Rádio Brasil Central	1950		Yes		Broadcast from Goiânia, Goiás.
Brazil	Rádio Daqui	?	2017	No		Broadcast from Goiânia, Goiás.
Brazil	Rádio Inconfidência	1936		Yes		Broadcast from Belo Horizonte, Minas Gerais. Operated by Empresa Mineira de Comunicação (Minas Gerais Communication Company), the public broadcasting company of the state of Minas Gerais.
Brazil	Rádio Itatiaia	1952	2017	No		Broadcast from Belo Horizonte, Minas Gerais.
Brazil	Rádio Congonhas	?		Yes		Broadcast from Congonhas, Minas Gerais.
Brazil	Rádio Marumby	1976		Yes		Religious broadcaster. Broadcast from Curitiba, Paraná.
Brazil	Radio Cultura Filadélfia	?		Yes		Religious broadcaster. Broadcast from Foz do Iguaçu, Paraná.
Brazil	Rádio Alvorada de Londrina	2001		Yes		Religious broadcaster. Broadcast from Londrina, Paraná.
Brazil	Rádio Difusora de Londrina	1950		Yes		Broadcast from Londrina, Paraná.
Brazil	Rádio Clube do Pará	1928		Yes		Broadcast from Belém, Pará.
Brazil	Radio Rural	?		Yes		Religious broadcaster. Broadcast from Santarem, Pará.
Brazil	Radio Relogio	?		Yes		Religious broadcaster. Broadcast from São Gonçalo, Rio de Janeiro.
Brazil	Rádio Gaúcha	1927		Yes		Broadcast from Porto Alegre, Rio Grande do Sul.
Brazil	Rádio Guaíba	1957		Yes		Broadcast from Porto Alegre, Rio Grande do Sul.
Brazil	Super Rede Boa Vontade	1992		Yes		Religious broadcaster. Broadcast from Porto Alegre, Rio Grande do Sul.
Brazil	Rádio Trans Mundial	1970	2018	No		Religious broadcaster. Broadcast from Santa Maria, Rio Grande do Sul.
Brazil	Radio Caiari	?		No		Religious broadcaster. Broadcast from Porto Velho, Rondônia.
Brazil	Rádio Roraima	?		Yes		Broadcast from Boa Vista, Roraima.
Brazil	Rádio Cultura de Cuiabá	?		Yes		Broadcast from Cuiabá, Mato Grosso.
Brazil	Rádio Voz Missionária	?		Yes		Religious broadcaster. Broadcast from Camboriú, Santa Catarina.
Brazil	Rádio Nove de Julho	1953		Yes		Religious broadcaster. Broadcast from São Paulo, São Paulo.
Brazil	Rádio Bandeirantes	1937	2017	No		Broadcast from São Paulo, São Paulo.
Brazil	Rádio Deus é Amor	1962		Yes		Religious broadcaster. Broadcast from São Paulo, São Paulo.
Brazil	Rádio Canção Nova	1980		Yes		Religious broadcaster. Broadcast from Cachoeira Paulista, São Paulo.
Brazil	Rádio Aparecida	1951		Yes		Religious broadcaster. Broadcast from Aparecida, São Paulo.
Brazil	Rádio Cultura	1932		Yes		Broadcast from Araraquara, São Paulo.
Brazil	Rádio Meteorologia	?		Yes		Broadcast from Ibitinga, São Paulo.
Brazil	Rádio Educadora	1939		Yes		Broadcast from Limeira, São Paulo.
Brazil	Rádio Novo Tempo	1989		Yes		Religious broadcaster. Broadcast from Jacareí, São Paulo.
Bulgaria	Radio Bulgaria	1930	2012	No	Yes	
Bulgaria	Radio Na Gaskiya	2018		No		Clandestine station targeted Nigeria.
Bulgaria	Raadiyoo Warra Wangeelaa	?		No		Religious broadcaster.
Burkina Faso	Radio Burkina	1959	2010	No		
Burundi	Radio-Télévision nationale du Burundi	1960	2003	No		
Burundi	Radio République Africaine	2001	2015	No		Clandestine station targeted Burundi.
Cameroon	Cameroon Radio Television	1987	2000	No		
Cameroon	FM Mont Cameroon	?	2011	No		
Cameroon	Voice of the Gospel	1966		No		Religious broadcaster.
Canada	Radio Canada International	1945	2012	No	Yes	Transmitted via CKCX in Sackville, New Brunswick. Operated by the Canadian Broadcasting Corporation. Known as CBC International Service until 1970. Continues as a web portal in 7 languages and produces podcasts in 5 foreign languages.
Canada	CBC Northern Service	1960	2012	No	Yes	Relayed via CKCX to northern Quebec. Continues online and via AM and FM relays
Canada	CFCX	1920	2010	No	No	A relay of CINW, based in Montreal, Quebec. Both stations went off the air in 2010.
Canada	CFRX	1937		Yes	Yes	A relay of CFRB, based in Toronto, Ontario. Online as CFRB Newstalk 1010.
Canada	CFVP	1931	2023	No	No	Based in Calgary, Alberta. Was a relay of CKMX (formerly CFCN).
Canada	CHNX	1955	2001	No	Yes	Based in Halifax, Nova Scotia. Relay of CHNS-FM. Shortwave relay discontinued but CHNS-FM continues on the air and online.
Canada	CHU	1923	2026	No	No	National Research Council time signal. Based in Ottawa. Discontinued June 22, 2026.
Canada	CKFX	1923	2007	No	Yes	Based in Vancouver, British Columbia. Relay of CKWX which continues on the air and online.
Canada	CKZU	1946	2017	No	Yes	A relay of CBU, based in Vancouver, British Columbia, which continues on the air and online.
Canada	CKZN	1939	2017	No	Yes	Based in St. John's, Newfoundland and Labrador, relay of CFGB Happy Valley-Goose Bay, which continues on the air and online. Intended target is remote areas of Labrador. Silent since 2017 but license renewed in 2022 by the CRTC.
Canada	CRCX	1930	1938	No	Yes	Based in Bowmanville, Ontario, originally VE9GW, founded by Gooderham and Worts as a relay of CKGW Toronto. Leased by the Canadian Radio Broadcasting Commission in 1933 along with CKGW, and renamed CRCX. Both stations purchased by the CBC in 1937. CKGW was renamed CBL and remains on the air and online as CBL-FM.
Canada	Bible Voice Broadcasting	2000		Yes	Yes	Religious broadcaster. Does not have its own transmitter but leases time on transmitters in Nauen, Tashkent, and Sofia Podcasts online.
Cape Verde	Radio Nacional de Cabo Verde	1987	1989	No		
Central African Republic	Radio Maïngo	2007		No		
Chad	Radiodiffusion et de Télévision du Tchad	1984	2013	No		
Chad	Radio Ndarason International	2018		Yes		Humanitarian station targeting Chad and neighbouring countries.
China, People's Republic of	China Radio International	1941		Yes	Yes	
China, People's Republic of	Voice of Jinling	1986		Yes		
China, People's Republic of	Voice of Strait	1958		Yes		
China, People's Republic of	Voice of Shangri-La	1986		Yes		
China, People's Republic of	Beibu Bay Radio	1984		Yes		
China, People's Republic of	Tibet People's Broadcasting Station	2003		Yes		
China, People's Republic of	Inner Mongolia People's Broadcasting Station	1950		Yes		
China, People's Republic of	Xinjiang People's Broadcasting Station	1950		Yes		
China, People's Republic of	Qinghai People's Broadcasting Station	1970		Yes		
China, People's Republic of	Gannan People's Broadcasting Station	1960		Yes		
China, People's Republic of	Guizhou People's Broadcasting Station	1968		Yes		
China, People's Republic of	Sichuan Radio and Television	1960		Yes		
China, People's Republic of	Hunan People's Broadcasting Station	1970		Yes		
China, People's Republic of	Hulunbeir People's Broadcasting Station	1950		Yes		
China, People's Republic of	China Huayi Broadcasting Corporations	1991		Yes		
China, People's Republic of	Voice of Pujiang	2011	2013	No		
China, Republic of/Taiwan	Voice of Free China / Radio Taiwan International	1949		Yes	Yes	
China, Republic of/Taiwan	Fu Hsin Broadcasting Station	1956		Yes		
China, Republic of/Taiwan	Kwanghua Broadcasting Station	1988		Yes		
China, Republic of/Taiwan	PCJ Radio	2008	2020	No	No	
Croatia	Voice of Croatia	1991	2013	No		
Colombia	Cadena Melodía de Colombia	1947	2012	No		
Colombia	Alcaraván Radio	?		Yes		
Colombia	La Voz de tu Conciencia	?		Yes		
Comoros	Radio Comores	1975	1997	No		
Cuba	Radio Havana Cuba	1961		Yes	Yes	
Cuba	Radio Progreso	1929		Yes		
Cuba	Radio Rebelde	1958		Yes		
Cyprus	Cyprus Broadcasting Corporation	1953	2013	No		
Cyprus	Bayrak Radio and Television Corporation	1963	2017	No		
Czech Republic	Radio Prague	1936		Yes	Yes	Leases time on various transmitters. Relayed on Radio Miami International (WRMI) since 2011.
Denmark	Radio Denmark	1948	2003	No	No	
Denmark	World Music Radio	1967		Yes		
Denmark	Radio 208	2019		No		
Denmark	Radio OZ-Viola	2018	2026	No		
Democratic Republic of Congo	Radio Télé Candip	1974		No		
Democratic Republic of Congo	Best Radio	2001		No		
Republic of Congo	Radio Congo	1945		Yes		
Djibouti	Radiodiffusion Television de Djibouti	1977	2010	No		
Ecuador	HCJB	1931		Yes		International and regional broadcasts ended in 2009. Current shortwave broadcasts target Ecuador only.
Egypt	Voice of the Arabs/Radio Cairo	1953		Yes		
Equatorial Guinea	Radio Nacional de Guinea Ecuatorial	1967	2021	No		
Eritrea	Voice of the Broad Masses of Eritrea	1993	2022	No		Clandestine station targeted Ethiopia.
Estonia	Radio Tallinn		1995	No		
Ethiopia	Ethiopian National Radio	1987	2023	No		
Ethiopia	Somali Regional State Radio	?		No		
Ethiopia	Voice of the Tigray Revolution	?		No		
Ethiopia	Radio Oromiyaa	?		Yes		
Ethiopia	Amhara Regional State Radio	?		Yes		
Ethiopia	Radio Fana	1994		Yes		
Ethiopia	Voice of Peace and Democracy of Eritrea	2005		No		Clandestine station targeted Eritrea.
Ethiopia	Voice of Democratic Alliance of Eritrea	1999		No		Clandestine station targeted Eritrea.
Finland	YLE Radio Finland	1938	2006	No	No	Transmitted via Lahti radio station from 1938 to 1948, Pori shortwave station from 1948 to 1987 and finally then new Pori's shortwave center in Preiviiki district from 1987 to the end of 2006. Known before early 1970s as shortwave service of Finnish Broadcasting Company.
Finland	Scandinavian Weekend Radio	2000		Yes		
France	Radio France Internationale	1945/1975		Yes	Yes	Known from 1945 to 1975 successively as RTF Radio Paris, RDF Radio France, and ORTF Radio Paris
France	Poste Colonial	1931	1938	No	No	State-owned, aimed at French colonial empire.
France	Paris-Mondial	1938	1940	No	No	State-owned, terminated by German invasion of France during WWII.
France	Radio-Paris Mondial	1940	1944	No	No	Used by German occupation forces to broadcast German propaganda in French, internationally
France	La Voix de la France	1941	1944	No	No	Operated by Vichy France regime with propaganda broadcasts aimed at French colonies.
France	Radio Eritrea International	2012		No		Clandestine station targeted Eritrea.
France	Radio Adal	2016	2018	No		Clandestine station targeted Eritrea.
France	Radio Al-Mukhtar	?	2018	No		Religious broadcaster. Clandestine station targeted Eritrea.
France	Radio Xoriyo	2000		No		Clandestine station targeted Eritrea.
France	Sagalee Qeerroo Bilisummaa	2016		No		Clandestine station targeted Eritrea.
France	Eye Radio	2016	2018	No		Clandestine station targeted Eritrea.
France	Quê Me Radio	?		No		Clandestine station targeted Vietnam.
French Polynesia	Radio Tahiti	1934	?	No		
Gabon	Africa No 1	1979	2013	No	Yes	Most powerful shortwave station in Africa
Germany	Deutsche Welle	1953	2026	No	Yes	State-owned
Germany	Radio Berlin International	1959	1990	No	No	East German station absorbed by Deutsche Welle due to German reunification
Germany	Deutscher Kurzwellensender (German Shortwave Station)	1933	1945	No	No	Nazi-era station operated by the Foreign Radio Section of the Ministry of Propaganda
Germany	Weltrundfunksender (World Radio Station)	1929	1933	No	No	Shortwave station operated by the Reichspost (post office)
Germany	Deutscher Wetterdienst	1952		Yes		Weather station
Germany	Evangelische Missions-Gemeinden	?		Yes		Religious broadcaster.
Germany	Radio Darc	?		Yes		
Germany	Radio Gloria International	1976	2018	No		
Germany	Radio Joystick	1985		Yes		
Germany	Hamburger Lokalradio	?		No		
Germany	Channel 292	1975		Yes		
Germany	Voice of Oromo Liberation	1992		No		Clandestine station targeted Ethiopia.
Georgia	Radio Georgia	1925	2005	No		
Georgia	Abkhaz Radio	1992	2022	No		
Ghana	Ghana Broadcasting Corporation	1935	2007	No		
Greece	Voice of Greece	1938	2022	No	Yes	Currently in Greek only.
Guinea	Radio Télévision Guinéenne	1958	2021	No		
Guinea-Bissau	Radiodifusão Nacional da República de Guiné-Bissau	1973	1987	No		
Hungary	Radio Budapest	1950	2007	No		
Iceland	Rikisutvarpid	1948	2007	No	Yes	
India	All India Radio	1939		Yes		
India	Voice of Kashmir	2002		No		
India	Azad Kashmir Radio	?		No		
India	Athmik Yathra Radio	1985		No		Religious broadcaster.
Indonesia	Voice of Indonesia	1945		Yes	Yes	
Iran	IRIB World Service	1956		Yes		
Iran	Voice of the Islamic Palestinian Revolution	2015		Yes		Clandestine station targeted Israel.
Iran	Radio Payam-e Doost	2001	2018	No		Clandestine station targeted Iran.
Ireland	Raidió Teilifís Éireann	1995	2004	No	Yes	
Israel	Israel Radio International	1950	2013	No		
Italy	Rai Italia Radio	1930	2007	No		
Italy	Italian Broadcasting Corporation	1979	2018	No		
Ivory Coast	Radiodiffusion-Télévision Ivorienne	1962	1996	No		
Japan	NHK World Radio Japan	1935		Yes	Yes	
Japan	Radio Nikkei	1954		Yes		
Japan	Shiokaze Radio	2004		Yes		Clandestine station targeted North Korea.
Japan	Furusato no Kaze Radio	2007		Yes		Clandestine station targeted North Korea.
Kenya	Kenya Broadcasting Corporation	1928	2006	No		
Kuwait	Radio Kuwait	1983		Yes		
Laos	Lao National Radio	1960	2020	No		
Latvia	Radio Riga/Radio Latvia	1925	1999	No		
Liberia	Radio ELWA	2000		Yes		
Libya	Libyan Radio and Television Network	2011	2013	No		
Lithuania	Radio Vilnius	1952	2009	No		
Madagascar	Radio Madagasikara	1960		No		
Malawi	Malawi Broadcasting Corporation	1964	2002	No		
Malaysia	Voice of Malaysia	1963	2011	No		
Malaysia	Radio Klasik FM	2012		Yes		
Malaysia	Radio Free Sarawak	2010	2014	No		Clandestine station targeted Malaysia.
Mali	Office de Radiodiffusion-Television du Mali	1983		Yes		
Mauritania	Radio Mauritanie	1960	2012	No		
Mexico	Radio México Internacional	1968	2004	No		
Mexico	Radio Educación	1924		Yes		
Moldova	Radio DMR		2012	No		External broadcasting from the breakaway region Transnistria
Moldova	Radio Moldova International	1992	2000	No		Broadcast via transmitters in Romania
Mongolia	Voice of Mongolia	1966		Yes	Yes	
Morocco	Radio Mediterranee Internationale	1980	2017	No		
Morocco	SNRT Radio National	1956	2012	No		
Mozambique	Radio Mozambique	1975	2001	No		
Myanmar	Myanmar Radio	1946		Yes		
Myanmar	Thazin Radio	?		Yes		
Namibia	Namibian Broadcasting Corporation	1979	2004	No		
Nepal	Radio Nepal	1951	2019	No		
Netherlands	Radio Netherlands Worldwide	1947	2013	No	No	
Netherlands	Philips Radio (PCJJ & PHOHI)	1927	1947	No	No	Private broadcaster. PHOHI was aimed at Dutch colonies in the East and West Indies, PCJJ was an international station broadcasting in English, Spanish, German and Dutch. Service suspended in 1940 due to World War II, resumed in 1945 until 1947 when the stations were nationalized and became Radio Netherlands.
Netherlands	The Mighty KBC	2009		Yes		Aimed at European truckers. Broadcast via WRMI Miami since 2023. Previously used transmitters in Vilnius, Lithuania and Nauen, Germany.
New Zealand	Radio New Zealand International	1948		Yes	Yes	
Niger	La Voix du Sahel	1958	2012	No		
Nigeria	Voice of Nigeria	1961		No		
Nigeria	Radio Nigeria-Kaduna	1962	2017	No		
Nigeria	Radio Na Gaskiya	2018		No		Clandestine station targeted Nigeria.
Nigeria	Radio Herwa International	2017	2018	No		Clandestine station targeted Nigeria. Relayed by Radio Miami International (WRMI) since 2018.
North Korea	Pyongyang Broadcasting Station	1955	2024	No		Jammed in South Korea.
North Korea	Korean Central Broadcasting Station	1945		Yes		Jammed in South Korea.
North Korea	Voice of Korea	1945		Yes		
North Korea	Voice of Unification	2013	2024	No		Clandestine station targeted to South Korea and also jammed in South Korea.
North Korea	Voice of National Salvation	1970	2003	No		Clandestine station targeted to South Korea and also jammed in South Korea.
Norway	NRK	1948	2003	No		
Norway	Voice of Tibet	1996		Yes		Clandestine station targeted China.
Norway	Democratic Voice of Burma	1992		Yes		Clandestine station targeted Myanmar.
Norway	Bergen Kringkaster	2012		Yes		
Oman	Radio Sultanate of Oman	1970	?	No		
Pakistan	Radio Pakistan	1973	2016	No		
Pakistan	Voice of Jammu and Kashmir Freedom Movement	1999	2015	No		Clandestine station targeted India.
Papua New Guinea	National Broadcasting Corporation	1973		No		
Paraguay	Radio Nacional del Paraguay	1942	2005	No		
Paraguay	LV del Chaco Paraguayo	?		No		Based in Filadelfia, Boqueron Department.
Paraguay	Radio P'ai Puku	?		No		Based in Asuncion.
Paraguay	Radio Licemil	?		No		Based in Ypané.
Peru	Radio La Voz Bolivar	?		No		Broadcasts from Bolivar in Peru.
Peru	Reina de la Selva	?		No		Broadcasts from Chachapoyas in Peru.
Peru	Radio Logos	?		Yes		Broadcasts from Chazuta in Peru.
Peru	Radio Vision	?		Yes		Broadcasts from Chiclayo in Peru.
Peru	Radio Voz Cristiana	?		No		Broadcasts from Chilca in Peru.
Peru	Radio OAW7J	?		No		Broadcasts from Cusco in Peru.
Peru	Radio OAW7I	?		No		Broadcasts from Cusco in Peru.
Peru	Radio Tawantinsuyo	?		No		Broadcasts from Cusco in Peru.
Peru	La Voz de las Huarinjas	?		No		Broadcasts from Huancabamba in Peru.
Peru	Radio Virgen del Carmen	?		No		Broadcasts from Huancavelica in Peru.
Peru	Radio Huanta	?	2017	Yes		Broadcasts from Huanta in Peru.
Peru	Radio Cultural Amauta	?		Yes		Broadcasts from Huanta in Peru.
Peru	Radio Ondas del Huallaga	?		No		Broadcasts from Huanuco in Peru.
Peru	Radio Ancash	?		No		Broadcasts from Huaraz in Peru.
Peru	Radio Melodia	?	2017	No		Broadcasts from Hunter Aqp in Peru.
Peru	Radio OAD3A	?		No		Broadcasts from Independecia in Peru.
Peru	La Voz de la Selva	?		No		Broadcasts from Iquitos in Peru.
Peru	Radio Victoria	?	2017	No		Broadcasts from Lima in Peru.
Peru	Radio Pacifico	1964		No		Broadcasts from Lima in Peru.
Peru	Radio San Antonio de Padua	1993	2006	No		Broadcasts from Padua in Peru.
Peru	Radio Madre de Dios	?		No		Broadcasts from Puerto Maldonado in Peru.
Peru	Radio Quillabamba	?		No		Broadcasts from Quillabamba in Peru.
Peru	Radio OAW2H	?		No		Broadcasts from Santiago de Chuco in Peru.
Peru	Radio Tarma	?		Yes		Broadcasts from Tarma in Peru.
Peru	Chaski Radio	?		Yes		Broadcasts from Urubamba in Peru.
Peru	Radio San Antonio	?		No		Broadcasts from Villa Atalaya in Peru.
Philippines	Radyo Pilipinas World Service	1972		Yes		
Philippines	Radio Veritas	1969	2018	No		Religious broadcaster.
Philippines	FEBC Radio	1949		Yes		Religious broadcaster.
Poland	Radio Poland	1936	2014	No	Yes	
Portugal	RDP Internacional	1935	2011	No		
Qatar	Qatar Media Corporation	1971	2002	No		
Romania	Radio Romania International	1927		Yes	Yes	Also digitally using DRM30
Russian Federation	Radio Moscow / Voice of Russia	1929	2014	No	Yes (Under the name Sputnik)	
Russian Federation	Radiostansiya Rodina	?	?	No		Translates to Radio Station Motherland
Russian Federation	Radiostansiya Atlantika	?	?	No		Broadcast to the Soviet fishing fleet
Russian Federation	Radio Mayak	1964	?	No		
Russian Federation	Radio Station Peace and Progress	1964	1991	No		
Russian Federation	National Broadcasting Company of Sakha	2005	2018	No		
Russian Federation	GTRK Kamchatka	2018		No		
Russian Federation	GTRK "Adygea"	1992	2021	No		
Rwanda	Radio Rwanda	1961	2015	No		
Saint Helena	Radio Saint Helena	1967	2009	No		
São Tomé and Príncipe	Radio Nacional de São Tomé e Príncipe	1975	1988	No		
Saudi Arabia	Saudi Broadcasting Corporation	1962		No		
Saudi Arabia	Radio Al-Azm	2017		Yes		Clandestine station targeted Yemen.
Senegal	Radiodiffusion Télévision Sénégalaise	1950	1997	No		
Serbia	Radio Belgrade / International Radio of Serbia	1935	2015	No		
Sierra Leone	Sierra Leone Broadcasting Corporation	1934	2002	No		
Singapore	Radio Singapore International	1994	2007	No		
Slovakia	Radio Slovakia International	1993		Yes	Yes	Relayed through Radio Miami International (WRMI) since 2011.
Slovenia	Radio Slovenia International	1992	2012	No		
Solomon Islands	Solomon Islands Broadcasting Corporation	1975		Yes		
Somalia	Puntland TV and Radio	2013		No		
Somalia	Warsan Radio	2016		Yes		
Somaliland	Radio Hargeisa	2012	2018	No		
South Africa	Radio RSA	1966	1992	No	No	Apartheid-era international service of SABC. Replaced by Channel Africa as a result of the end of apartheid.
South Africa	Channel Africa	1992	2019	No	Yes	International service of the state-owned SABC. Remains available via satellite and online.
South Africa	South African Radio League	1925		Yes	No	Radio club broadcasts weekly bulletins in English and Afrikaans. Bulletins available online in text format only.
South Africa	Radio Sonder Grense	1937	2019	No	Yes	Domestic Afrikaans-language radio service operated by the SABC. Used shortwave to reach remote areas of South Africa. Shortwave transmissions discontinued with closure of Meyerton transmitter but remains available on FM, satellite, and online.
South Korea	KBS World Radio	1953		Yes	Yes	
South Korea	KBS Hanminjok Radio	1972		Yes		Jammed by North Korea.
South Korea	Korea Radio	2005		Yes		Targeted North Korea and also jammed by North Korea.
South Korea	North Korea Reform Radio	2007		Yes		Targeted North Korea and also jammed by North Korea.
South Korea	Voice of Wilderness	1993		Yes		Targeted North Korea and also jammed by North Korea.
South Korea	Voice of Freedom	2008	2025	No		Targeted North Korea. Broadcasts suspended on September 1, 2025, as part of South Korean government measures to reduce inter-Korean military tensions.
South Korea	Radio Free Chosun	2005		Yes		Targeted North Korea and also jammed by North Korea.
South Korea	Open Radio for North Korea	2005	2018	No		Targeted North Korea and also jammed by North Korea.
South Korea	Voice of the People	1986	2025	No		Targeted North Korea. Broadcasts suspended in July 2025.
South Korea	Radio Echo of Hope	1973	2025	No		Targeted North Korea. Broadcasts suspended in July 2025.
South Korea	MND Radio	2010	2013	No		Targeted North Korea and also jammed by North Korea.
Spain	Radio Exterior de España	1942		Yes	Yes	
Sri Lanka	Radio Ceylon	1949		No	Yes	Operated by Sri Lanka Broadcasting Corporation
Sudan	Voice of Africa	1956		No		
Suriname	Radio Apintie	1980		No		
Sweden	Radio Sweden	1938	2010	No	Yes	
Sweden	IBRA Media	?		Yes		Religious broadcaster.
Sweden	Radio Ranginkaman (Rainbow Radio)	2012		No		Clandestine station targeted lesbian, gay, bisexual, and transgender people in Iran, Afghanistan and Tajikistan.
Switzerland	Swiss Radio International	1930	2004	No		
Syria	Radio Damascus	1957	2013	No		
Tajikistan	Voice of Tajik	?	2025	No	Yes	
Tanzania	Tanzania Broadcasting Corporation	1951	2005	No		
Tanzania	Zanzibar Broadcasting Corporation	1951	2021	No		
Thailand	Radio Thailand World Service	1938	2025	No		
Tunisia	Radio Tunis Chaîne Internationale	1938	2015	No		
Turkey	Voice of Turkey	1937		Yes		
Togo	Radiodiffusion-Télévision Togolaise	1973	2003	No		
Uganda	Uganda Broadcasting Corporation	1963	2015	No		
Ukraine	Radio Ukraine International	1950	2022	No	Yes	Broadcasts from Ukrainian transmitters ended in 2011; later relayed via Germany and WRMI, Florida
United Kingdom	BBC World Service	1932		Yes	Yes	Previously known as the BBC Empire Service (1932-1939), BBC Overseas Service (1939-1965)
United Kingdom	Voice of the People of Somaliland	2017	2017	No		
United Kingdom	Dandal Kura	2015		No		
United Kingdom	Al-Quds TV	2009	?	No		
United Kingdom	End Times Coming Radio	?		No		Religious broadcaster.
United States	Voice of America (VOA)	1942		Yes	Yes	Government-owned broadcaster
United States	Radio Free Europe	1949		No		Government-owned broadcaster originally targeting Eastern Europe during the Cold War
United States	Radio Liberty	1953		Yes		Government-owned broadcaster originally targeting the Soviet Union during the Cold War
United States	Radio Martí	1985		Yes		Government-owned broadcaster targeting Cuba
United States	American Forces Network	1970		No		
United States	Radio Free Asia	1996		Yes		Government-owned broadcaster targeting People's Republic of China and other Communist countries in East Asia.
United States	Radio Farda	2002		Yes		Government-owned broadcaster targeting Iran
United States	Radio Azadi	2002	2025	No		Government-owned broadcaster targeting Afghanistan
United States	Radio Mashaal	2010	2025	No		Government-owned broadcaster targeting Pashtuns in Afghanistan and Pakistan.
United States	KGEI	1939	1994	No		Based in Redwood Shores, California.
United States	KJES	1992	2014	No		Based in Vado, New Mexico.
United States	KNLS	1983		Yes		Based in Anchor Point, Alaska.
United States	KYOI	1982	1989	No		Based in Saipan, Northern Mariana Islands.
United States	KWHR	1993	2009	No		Based in Naalehu, Hawaii.
United States	KWID	1942	1953	No	No	Based in San Francisco. Leased by the US governmenment from Associated Broadcasters for use by Voice of America.
United States	KWIX	1943	1953	No	No	Based in San Francisco. Leased by the US governmenment from Associated Broadcasters for use by Voice of America.
United States	WWRB	1977	2020	No		Based in Manchester, Tennessee.
United States	WWCR	1989		Yes		Based in Nashville, Tennessee.
United States	WTWW	2010	2022	No		Based in Lebanon, Tennessee.
United States	WRNO	1982	2011	No		Based in New Orleans, Louisiana.
United States	WRMI Radio Miami International	1994		Yes	Yes	Based in Okeechobee, Florida.
United States	WMLK	1981		Yes		Based in Bethel, Pennsylvania. Religious broadcaster.
United States	WINB	1962		Yes		Based in Red Lion, Pennsylvania.
United States	WHRI	1985		No		Based in Furman, South Carolina.
United States	WEWN	1992	2026	No	Yes	Catholic radio operated by EWTN. Transmitted from Shelby County, Alabama. Ceased shortwave transmission on 31 Oct 2026.
United States	WBCQ	1998		Yes		Based in Monticello, Maine.
United States	WJHR	2009		Yes		Based in Milton, Florida. (Broadcasts in Upper Side Band)
United States	WSHB	1989	2004	No		Based in Furman, South Carolina
United States	The Voice of Hope	1986	2023	No		Religious broadcaster.
United States	Trans World Radio	1952		Yes		Religious broadcaster.
United States	Adventist World Radio	1971		Yes		Religious broadcaster.
United States	Far East Broadcasting Company	1945		Yes		Religious broadcaster.
United States	University Network	1975		Yes		Religious broadcaster.
United States	Family Radio	1959	2013	No		Religious broadcaster.
United States	Oromia Media Network	2016	2018	No		Based in Minneapolis, Minnesota.
United States	Radio Tamazuj	2011		Yes		Clandestine station targeted Sudan.
United States	Radio Dabanga	2008		Yes		Clandestine station targeted Sudan.
United States	Radio Biafra	?	2018	No		Clandestine station targeted Nigeria.
United States	KAIJ	1980	2018	No		Based in Dallas, Texas.
United States	KTBN	1987	2008	No		Based in Salt Lake City, Utah.
United States	WHRA	1985	2009	No		Based in Greenbush, Maine.
United States	Follow the Bible Ministries	2015		Yes		Religious broadcaster.
United States	Voice of Khmer M'Chas Srok	2014	2018	No		Clandestine station targeted Cambodia.
United States	Sound of Hope	2003		Yes		Clandestine station targeted China.
United States	Voice of China	1991		Yes		Clandestine station targeted China.
United States	Radio Republica	2005		Yes		Clandestine station targeted Cuba.
United States	Radio Itahuka	2016		Yes		Clandestine station targeted Rwanda.
Radio Sedaye Mardom	2015	2017	No		Clandestine station targeted Sudan.	
Radio Munansi	2018		No		Clandestine station targeted Uganda.	
Uruguay	Radiodifusion Nacional Uruguay	1945	2015	No		
Uzbekistan	Radio Tashkent	1949	2007	No		
Vanuatu	Radio Vanuatu	1980		Yes		
Vatican City	Vatican Radio	1931		Yes	Yes	https://www.vaticannews.va/en/short-waves.html
Venezuela	Canal Internacional de Radio Nacional de Venezuela	1936	2010	No		
Vietnam	Voice of Vietnam	1945		Yes		
Vietnam	Dien Bien Radio Station	?	?	No		No Longer broadcast on shortwave.
Western Sahara	National Radio of the Saharan Arab Democratic Republic	1975	2011	No		
Yemen	Radio Sanna	1991		Yes		Irregular
Zambia	Zambia National Broadcasting Corporation	1941	2022	No	No	
Zimbabwe	Zimbabwe Broadcasting Corporation	1963	2012	No	No	

== By frequency ==
The following table lists selected shortwave broadcasting frequencies and registered transmission schedules for the B26 season, beginning on October 25, 2026. Registered schedules do not necessarily indicate that every transmission is on the air. Days are numbered from Sunday (1) to Saturday (7); ND means non-directional. All times are UTC.

Frequency (MHz)	Program	Transmitter site	Time, UTC	Days	Language	Power (kW)	Azimuth (°)	Remarks
3.955	Channel 292	(Germany) Rohrbach	07:00–20:00	1234567	German	1	0	Registered schedule; individual programmes vary.
3.975	Shortwave Radio	(Germany) Winsen	00:00–24:00	1234567	Various	5	0	Registered transmission window.
3.995	HCJB / Voice of the Andes	(Germany) Weenermoor	05:00–24:00	1234567	Various	1	90	
5.905	Deutscher Wetterdienst	(Germany) Pinneberg	06:00–06:30; 12:00–12:30; 16:00–16:30	1234567	German	10	ND	Weather broadcasts.
5.920	HCJB / Voice of the Andes	(Germany) Weenermoor	07:00–22:00	1234567	Various	1	145	
6.070	Channel 292	(Germany) Rohrbach	00:00–24:00	1234567	German	2	0	Registered transmission window; individual programmes vary.
6.085	Radio 700	(Germany) Kall	08:00–18:00	1234567	Various	1	0	
6.120	Radio France Internationale	(France) Issoudun	06:00–07:00	1234567	Hausa	250	273	
6.150	Europa 24	(Germany) Datteln	07:00–15:00	1234567	Various	15	0	
6.160	Shortwave Radio	(Germany) Winsen	00:00–24:00	1234567	Various	5	0	Registered transmission window.
6.170	Scandinavian Weekend Radio	(Finland) Virrat	22:00–22:00 the following day	Selected dates	Finnish	0.1	ND	The published November 2026 broadcast runs from November 6 at 22:00 UTC to November 7 at 22:00 UTC; not a weekly service.
6.180	Deutscher Wetterdienst	(Germany) Pinneberg	06:00–06:30; 12:00–12:30; 16:00–16:30	1234567	German	10	ND	Weather broadcasts.
6.180	China Radio International	(China) Kashi	00:00–02:00	1234567	English	100	173	
6.180	China Radio International	(Cuba) Havana	01:00–02:00	1234567	English	250	10	
7.245	Radio France Internationale	(France) Issoudun	06:00–06:30	1234567	Hausa	250	170	
7.285	BBC World Service	(United Kingdom) Ascension Island	05:00–06:00	1234567	English	125	65	
7.285	BBC World Service	(United Kingdom) Woofferton	06:00–06:29	1234567	French	125	170	
7.350	China Radio International	(China) Kashi	00:00–02:00	1234567	English	500	308	
7.360	Vatican Radio	(Vatican City) Santa Maria di Galeria	05:20–05:40	1234567	Ukrainian	250	54	
7.360	Vatican Radio	(Vatican City) Santa Maria di Galeria	17:40–18:00	1234567	Ukrainian	100	54	
7.390	Radio France Internationale	(France) Issoudun	05:00–06:00	1234567	French	500	155	
7.390	Radio France Internationale	(France) Issoudun	06:00–07:00	1234567	French	250	195	
9.275	WMLK	(United States) Bethel, Pennsylvania	23:00–04:00	123456	English	300	53	Days follow the HFCC registration.
9.410	BBC World Service	(United Kingdom) Ascension Island	05:00–07:00	1234567	English	125	27	
9.670	Channel 292	(Germany) Rohrbach	00:00–24:00	1234567	German	2	0	Registered transmission window; individual programmes vary.
9.690	Radio Exterior de España	(Spain) Noblejas	15:00–24:00	17	Spanish	200	290	
9.690	Radio Exterior de España	(Spain) Noblejas	19:00–04:00	23456	Spanish	200	290	
9.710	Vatican Radio	(Vatican City) Santa Maria di Galeria	05:20–05:40	1234567	Ukrainian	250	55	
9.710	Vatican Radio	(Vatican City) Santa Maria di Galeria	07:05–08:00	1	Ukrainian	100	54	Sunday liturgy.
9.710	Vatican Radio	(Vatican City) Santa Maria di Galeria	17:40–18:00	1234567	Ukrainian	100	54	
11.690	Scandinavian Weekend Radio	(Finland) Virrat	22:00–22:00 the following day	Selected dates	Finnish	0.1	ND	Published alongside 6.170 MHz for the November 6–7, 2026 broadcast.
11.815	Vatican Radio	(Vatican City) Santa Maria di Galeria	07:05–08:00	1	Ukrainian	250	58	Sunday liturgy.
11.940	Radio Exterior de España	(Spain) Noblejas	15:00–24:00	17	Spanish	200	230	
11.940	Radio Exterior de España	(Spain) Noblejas	22:00–04:00	23456	Spanish	200	230	
11.995	Radio France Internationale	(France) Issoudun	18:00–19:00	1234567	French	250	200	
12.030	Radio Exterior de España	(Spain) Noblejas	15:00–24:00	17	Spanish	200	110	
12.030	Radio Exterior de España	(Spain) Noblejas	16:00–24:00	23456	Spanish	200	110	
13.740	Radio France Internationale	(France) Issoudun	18:00–19:00	1234567	French	250	180	
15.125	China Radio International	(China) Beijing	00:00–01:00	1234567	English	500	215	
15.150	WMLK	(United States) Bethel, Pennsylvania	12:00–17:00	123456	English	300	53	
15.300	Radio France Internationale	(France) Issoudun	18:00–19:00	1234567	French	250	160	
15.685	BBC World Service	(United Kingdom) Woofferton	17:30–17:50; 18:30–18:50	23456	Amharic	125	122	
17.525	WMLK	(United States) Bethel, Pennsylvania	17:30–22:30	123456	English	300	53	
17.620	Radio France Internationale	(France) Issoudun	08:00–09:00	1234567	French	250	160	
17.620	Radio France Internationale	(France) Issoudun	09:00–10:00	1234567	French	250	175	
17.860	Radio France Internationale	(France) Issoudun	16:00–17:00	1234567	Hausa	250	170	

== See also ==
- International broadcasting
- List of American shortwave broadcasters
- List of European short wave transmitters
- Shortwave broadcasting
