= WRNO =

WRNO may refer to:

- WRNO (shortwave), a shortwave radio station located in Metairie, Louisiana, United States
- WRNO-FM, a radio station (99.5 FM) licensed to New Orleans, Louisiana, United States
