= Lorenzo Martínez =

Lorenzo Martínez may refer to:

- Lorenzo Martínez (volleyball)
- Lorenzo Martínez (musician)
