= Kari Berggrav =

Photojournalist (b. 1911, d. 1996)

- Born: Kari Nissen; November 30, 1911; Norway
- Died: June 11, 1996 (aged 84); Lewisburg, Pennsylvania, United States
- Occupation: photojournalist
- Parent(s): Oscar Nissen; Ellen Margrethe Grete Nissen

Kari N. Berggrav (November 30, 1911 Norway - June 11, 1996 Lewisburg, Pennsylvania) was a pioneer Norwegian photojournalist and war photographer. Her career had two peaks; as a war photographer in Norway in 1940 (these pictures have been lost) and as a UN staff photographer in 1948. She was the daughter of engineer Oscar Nissen and Ellen Margrethe Grete Nissen (the family seem to have changed their name from Nissen to Berggrav). It was a prominent family; her uncle, her mother's brother, was Bishop Eivind Berggrav, the Lutheran bishop of Oslo and primate of Norway. When King left Norway after his defeat by the Germans in WWII, he left Bishop Berggrav as leader of the administrative council. The bishop was soon imprisoned by the Gestapo, but managed to lead the resistance of the Norwegian church from within prison and survive the war.

== First Photographs ==
Kari’s first surviving photographs are of Norwegian civil defense before the war. At this time, she first met Wilhelm Reich, a psychoanalyst and early disciple of Freud who then had strong left-wing sympathies. She photographed and filmed his discoveries of spontaneously occurring microscopic life which he believed related to the energy of life, the orgone. These findings are now, almost universally, believed to be pseudo-scientific.

In 1947 Popular Photography magazine recorded that “she studied art in Berlin in 1932. Later she opened her own photographic studio in Oslo, doing assignments for magazines and publishers. She worked awhile as a Medical Photographer at the University Hospital, becoming an expert on photomicrography. Prior to the war she was a photographer on the staff of the Arbeiderbladet (now the Dagsavisen, the newspaper of the Labour party. It was then the second biggest newspaper in Norway, and she was probably the first female press photographer in Norway. Her work tasks ranged from fashion to crime photography. She also took pictures of members of the royal family). When the Germans invaded Norway, she was official photographer for the Norwegian General Command until the surrender when she escaped to Finland. From there, by way of Russia, Iran, India, South Africa, Montreal, Toronto, she made her way to the United States. In New York in 1941 she worked at radio station WRUL (wartime call letters for WNYW (shortwave)) where she broadcast a news program in Norwegian which was beamed to Norway and all the Norwegian ships, while at the same time working as a photographer for the Norwegian government. She later became chief of the picture department at the Norwegian embassy in Washington. The year 1944 found her on the West coast working as a writer and researcher for the Walt Disney studio, which was followed by an abortive attempt to open a photographic studio in Hollywood, whose failure sent her packing off to New York and the UN where she began working as a photographer last year (1946)". The article includes a picture of her working at the UN.

As a war photographer she documented the fighting in Narvik in 1940, during the short Norwegian war against the Germans. As the Norwegian army retreated north, its gold reserves were transported North by sea along the North Sea coast. Kari was the only female passenger on this ship, so the crew, wishing to give her some privacy, made her a cabin within the wooden cases of gold bars in the hold. When the gold was transferred by a British destroyer for transport to England, she remained in Norway. (She had taken over 600 pictures, only 200 were preserved. Later these were exhibited in San Francisco, New York and Washington. It is uncertain where the photographs are now stored.) Eventually she escaped via Finland, the Soviet Union and Iran to the USA.

== Work during WW II ==
1942 finds her in New York, studying photography in H. P. Sidel’s “The school of modern photography” in New York, publishing a “photo story” in the October 1942 edition of “Minicam” and working for the Norwegian information office. She was interviewed on the popular “It's One O’clock and Here Is Mary Margaret McBride” radio show. She trekked overland to Hollywood, working as a retoucher for Disney and contributing photo-essays to “Popular Photography” magazine. This period of intense activity in radio and photojournalism was part of a wider effort directed by the Norwegian government-in-exile to persuade Norwegian Americans to lobby Federal government of the United States to enter the European theatre of World War II. At the end of this period, she clearly had some sort of breakdown which she describes in the November 1945 issue of "Popular Photography in the text of a photo-essay about cats. This issue also includes a photograph of her. There were many newspaper articles about her in the USA in this period. She regained contact with the psycho-analyst Wilhelm Reich, from whose circle she received treatment for mental illness from the time she first met him in Norway.

== Staff Photographer at the UN ==
1946-8 was the peak of her career. She was one of three staff photographers at the UN and took many remarkable pictures, of which those of Eleanor Roosevelt are the best known. It is of note that the first Secretary-General of the United Nations was Norway's Trygve Lie. After 1948 she appears to have ceased working as a photographer. In 1974 she describes herself as an organic farmer and is still undergoing psychiatric treatment. She died in obscurity in 1996 in Lewisburg, Pennsylvania.

Some of her photographs can be seen at the Preus Museum of photography in Norway, and the "Arbeiderbevegelsens arkiv og bibliotek" (Norway Labour Museum and Archive). Many are in the issues of Popular Photography, some of which listed below. Her best images are on the UN website. Perhaps finest are her photos of Eleanor Roosevelt, which is still being used in the context of the Universal Declaration of Human Rights.

Kari Berggrav also has a Begonia named after her; "Begonia Kari Berggrav".
