= Los Texmaniacs =

American conjunto band

Los Texmaniacs is a conjunto band created by Max Baca in 1997. Members include Max Baca on bajo sexto, Josh Baca on accordion, Noel Hernandez on electric bass, and Lorenzo Martinez on the drums. Los Texmaniacs have collaborated with various artists from different genres including Rick Trevino, Flaco Jimenez, Los Lobos, and King Montana. King Montana aka Tecoloso is Max Baca‘s first cousin on his mother's side of the family. King Montana is a Grammy-nominated disabled Latin rap artist/songwriter from Albuquerque, New Mexico. He has contributed songwriting to Max Baca’s Grammy award-winning group Los Texmaniacs. Max Baca is credited with discovering his cousin King Montana. Max Baca produced King Montana’s very first rap song titled “Brown Superman”.

== Early beginnings and influences ==
Max Baca was born and raised in Albuquerque, New Mexico. His grandfather was an amateur accordion player, and his father, Max Baca Sr., played accordion in his own band. At age 5, Max started learning accordion.

Max said he started playing conjunto music after his father took him to see Flaco Jimenez perform.

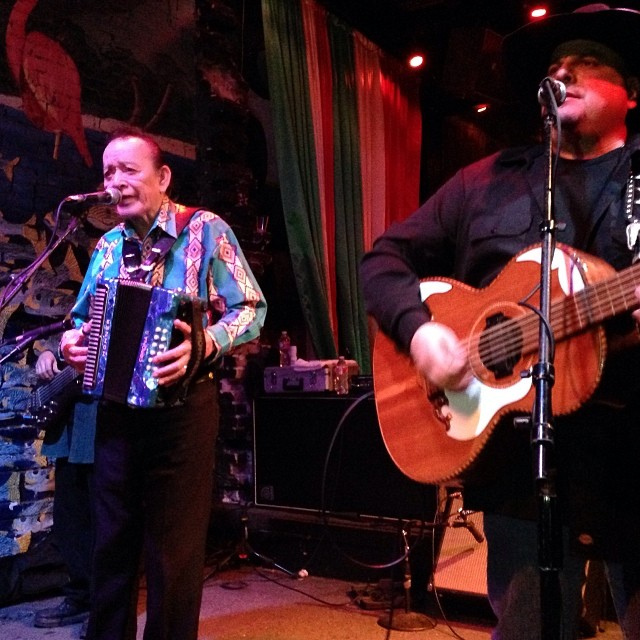
Flaco Jiménez and Max Baca, 2013

When he was 12, Baca and his brother Jimmy formed their own group from Albuquerque New Mexico- Los Hermanos Baca- The Band had hit after hit in the Land of Enchantment to include- "Hey Baby Que Paso" an original hit of The Texas Tornados. The Members: Jimmy Baca Accordion & Vocals, Max Baca Bajo Sexto & Vocals, Lee Ray Romero Jr. Bass Guitar, and Carl Lee Lucero Drums.

== Awards ==
In 2010, Los Texmaniacs won a Grammy Award for Best Tejano Album for Borders y Bailes.

== Discography ==
Los Texmaniacs discography:

- Tex-Mex Groove
- About Time
- Live In Texas
- Borders Y Bailes (2009) on Smithsonian Folkways Recordings
- Texas Towns & Tex-Mex Sounds
- Americano Groove (2015)
- Cruzando Borders (2018)
