= List of European short wave transmitters =

This is a list of short wave transmitters in Europe.

== Active stations ==
Frequency (MHz)	Program	Transmitter site	Time, UTC	Days	Language	Power (kW)	Az	Remarks
3.965	Radio France Internationale (DRM)	(France) Issoudun	01:00-00:57	1234567	French (Digital)	1	ND	(France) RFI
3.975	6160 Shortwave AM Radio	(Germany) Winsen	16:00-18:00	.234567	English	1	ND	(Germany)
3.985	SRF Schweizer Radio	(Germany) Kall-Krekel	16:00-17:00	1234567	German	1	ND	(Germany)
3.995	HCJB Deutsch	(Germany) Weenermoor	05:30-15:30	1234567	German	1.5	ND	(Germany) HCJ
4.026	Laser Hot Hits	?	00:00-00:00	1234567	English	?	?	(Republic of Ireland)
4.625	UVB-76	(Russia) Kerro	00:00-00:00	?	Russian	?	?	(Russia)
4.996	RWM Etalon Vremeni	(Russia) Taldom	?	?	Russian	5	?	(Russia) RC3
5.000	IAM Segnale Orario	(Italy) Rome	?	?	Italian	?	?	(Italy) EUR
5.140	Charleston Radio International	Bozen	00:00-24:00	1234567	English	1	ND	
5.825	Radio OZ-Viola	(Denmark) Hillerod	?	?	Danish	0.15	?	(Denmark)
5.830	Dneprovskaya Volna	(Ukraine) Zaporizhzhia	04:00-07:00	.....67	Ukrainian	0.25	?	(Ukraine)
5.840	World Music Radio	(Denmark) Karup	00:00-00:00	1234567	Danish	0.1	ND	-
5.895	LKB/LLE	(Norway) Bergen Kringkaster	04:30-23:00	1234567	Norwegian	1	ND	(Norway) E-3
5.900	BIBLE VOICE BCN/ Radio Dardasha7	(Bulgaria) Kostinbrod (Sofia)	18:15-18:30	1234567	Arabic	50	126	(Bulgaria) BVBN
5.910	Interradio Romania	(Romania) Tiganesti-Saftica	14:30-14:57	1234567	Macedonian	100	240	(Romania)
5.905	Deutscher Wetterdienst	(Germany) Pinneberg	16:00-16:30	1234567	German	10	ND	(Germany)
5.920	HCJB Deutsch	(Germany) Weenermoor	05:30-15:30	1234567	German	1	145	(Germany) HCJ
5.930	Interradio Romania							
5.935	Interradio Romania							
5.940	Interradio Romania (DRM)	(Romania) Tiganesti	05:30-05:57	1234567	Russian	90	37	(Romania)
5.955	Interradio Romania							
5.970	China Radio International	(Albania) Cerrik	16:00-18:00	1234567	German	150	330	(Albania)
5.980	Scandinavian Weekend Radio	(Finland) Virrat	00:01-00:00	.....6.	Finnish	0.1	ND	
5.990	Interradio Romania							
6.000	Radio Rossii Adygeya	(Russia) Tbilisskaya			Russian	1000		
6.005	BBC	(United Kingdom) Woofferton	05:00-06:00	1234567	English	250	184	(United Kingdom)
6.005	Schweizer Radio SRF	(Germany) Kall-Krekei	10:30-11:00	.23456.	German	1	10	(Germany)
6.005	RSI (Radio Slovakia International)	(Germany) Kall-Krekei	11:00-16:30		German, English, French, Slovenian, German, English, French, German, English, French, Slovenian			
6.020	Interradio Romania							
6.030	Interradio Romania (DRM)	(Romania) Tiganesti	16:00-16:57	1234567	Russian	90	37	(Romania)
6.040	Interradio Romania							
6.070	Radio Channel 292	(Germany) Rohrbach Waal	05:25-19:00	1234567	German, Dutch, English	25	ND	(Germany)
6.085	Radio MiAmigo	(Germany) Kall-Krekei	09:00-14:00	1234567	English	20	ND	(Germany)
6.090	Caribbean Beacon (University Network)	(United Kingdom) Anguilla	22:00-10:00	1234567	English	100	320	(United Kingdom) CBB
6.100	Interradio Romania							
6.130	Interradio Romania							
6.145	Interradio Romania							
6.150	Radio Marabu	(Germany) Datteln	06:00-16:00	1234567	German	0.15	ND	(Germany)
6.150	Europa 24	(Germany) Datteln	16:00-18:00	1234567	German	0.15	ND	(Germany)
6.155	Interradio Romania							
~~6.155~~	~~Ö1~~	~~(Austria) Moosbrunn~~			~~Deutsch~~	~~300~~		
6.160	6160 AM Shortwave Radio	(Germany) Winsen	10:00-12:00	.234567	English	1	ND	(Germany)
6.170	Interradio Romania	(Romania) Tiganesti-Saftica	21:30-21:57	1234567	English	300	307	(Romania)
6.170	Scandinavian Weekend Radio	(Finland) Virrat	00:01-00:00	.....6.	Finnish	0.1	ND	
6.170	Radio Onda	Margraten	00:00-24:00	1234567	Portuguese-English	0.35		RON
6.175	Radio France Internationale	(France) Issoudun	09:00-12:00	1234567	French	100	153,267	(France)
6.180	Deutscher Wetterdienst	(Germany) Pinneberg	16:00-16:30	1234567	German	10	ND	(Germany)
6.205	Laser Hot Hits				English			
6.990	Radio Voronezh	(Russia)	12:00-15:00	1234567	Russian	1	ND	?
7.220	Interradio Romania							
7.235	Interradio Romania							
7.285	China Radio International	(Albania) Cerrik	09:00-09:57	1234567	Romanian	150	ND	(Albania)
7.315	Interradio Romania							
7.325	Interradio Romania							
~~7.330~~	~~Radio Joystick~~	~~(Austria) Moosbrunn~~	~~10:00-11:00~~	~~1......~~	~~English~~	~~100~~	~~283~~	~~(Austria) MVB/MBR~~
7.340	Interradio Romania							
7.345	BBC	(United Kingdom) Woofferton	05:00-06:00	1234567	English	250	170	(United Kingdom)
7.350	Interradio Romania							
7.360	Interradio Romania	(Romania) Tiganesti	15:00-15:27	1234567	Russian	300	37	(Romania)
7.365	HCJB Deutsch	(Germany) Weenermoor	06:00-16:00	1234567	German	2	145	(Germany)
7.370	Interradio Romania							
7.375	Interradio Romania	(Romania) Tiganesti-Saftica	12:00-12:57	1234567	Romanian	100	300	(Romania)
7.390	Interradio Romania	(Romania) Tiganesti	04:30-04:57	1234567	Russian	300	37	(Romania)
7.395	Interradio Romania	(Romania) Galbeni	23:57-01:57	1234567	Romanian	300	310	(Romania) ROR
7.410	Interradio Romania							
7.440	Radio Channel 292	(Germany) Rohrbach Waal						
7.450	ERT3 102FM	(Greece) Athens			Greek	100		
9.420	ERA I Foni tis Elladas	(Greece) Athens	05:00-22:55	1234567	Greek	250	323	(Greece) ERT
9.490	Interradio Romania							
9.50	Interradio Romania	(Romania) Galbeni	17:00-19:57	1234567	Romanian	300	285	(Romania)
9.50	Golos And	(Germany) Nauen	15:30-16:30		Russian			(Germany)
9.510	Interradio Romania							
9.520	Interradio Romania							
9.535	Interradio Romania							
9.545	BBC	(Bulgaria) Kostinbrod-Sofia	17:30-17:49	.23456.	Amharic	200	156	(Bulgaria)
9.565	China Radio International	(Albania) Cerrik	15:00-15:57	1234567	Turkish	150	ND	(Albania)
9.570	Interradio Romania							
9.580	Interradio Romania	(Romania) Tiganesti	15:00-15:27	1234567	Russian	300	37	(Romania)
9.585	Interradio Romania							
9.600	Interradio Romania	(Romania) Tiganesti-Saftica	12:00-12:57	1234567	Spanish	300	247	(Romania)
9.610	Interradio Romania							
9.620	Interradio Romania							
9.640	VATICAN RADIO	(Vatican City) Santa Maria di Galeria	16:40-17:00	1234567	Ukrainian	100	54	(Vatican City)
9.645	VATICAN RADIO	(Vatican City) Santa Maria di Galeria	06:05-07:00	1.....	Ukrainian	250	26	(Vatican City)
9.740	Interradio Romania							
9.770	Interradio Romania							
9.800	Interradio Romania							
9.810	Interradio Romania							
9.820	Interradio Romania							
9.830	ADVENTIST WORLD RADIO	(Germany) Nauen	16:00-16:30	1234567	Bulgarian	100	135	(Germany)
9.870	Interradio Romania							
9.880	Interradio Romania							
9.935	ERA I Foni tis Elladas/ERT3 102 FM	(Greece) Athens	13:00-04:55	1234567	Greek	100	285	(Greece)
9.996	RWM Etalon Vremeni	(Russia) Taldom	?	?	Russian	8	?	(Russia)
11.530	Voice of Welt (Radyo Denge Welat)	(France) Issoudun	15:00-21:00	1234567	Kurdish	250	90	(France) MEZ
11.645	ERA I Foni tis Elladas	(Greece) Athens	?	1234567	Greek	100	?	(Greece)
11.650	Interradio Romania	(Romania) Galbeni-Bacau	10:00-10:57	1234567	French	300	285	(Romania)
11.660	Interradio Romania							
11.700	VATICAN RADIO	(Vatican City) Santa Maria di Galeria	16:40-17:00	1234567	Ukrainian	100	58	(Vatican City)
11.740	VATICAN RADIO	(Vatican City) Santa Maria di Galeria	06:05-07:00	1......	Ukrainian	250	62	(Vatican City)
11.780	Interradio Romania							
11.790	Interradio Romania							
11.800	Interradio Romania							
11.820	Interradio Romania							
11.825	Interradio Romania							
11.920	China Radio International	(Albania) Cerrik	14:00-15:57	1234567	French	150	240	(Albania)
11.945	Interradio Romania							
~~11.955~~	~~World Adventist Radio~~	~~(Austria) Moosbrunn~~	~~15:00-15:30~~	~~1234567~~	~~Turkish~~	~~300~~	~~115~~	~~(Austria)~~
11.960	Interradio Romania							
11.975	Interradio Romania							
11.980	Dniprovska Khvilya	(Ukraine) Zaporizhzhia			Ukrainian		0.25	(Ukraine)
12.005	Radio Farda	(United Kingdom) Woofferton	13:00-18:00	1234567	Persian	300	90	(United Kingdom)
12.160	TWR India	(Maryland) Kishinev-Grigoriopol	14:45-15:45	.23456.	Panjabi	300	98	(Maryland)
13.565	S06 Spy Numbers	(Russia)	09:10-09:15	1234567	?	?	?	(Russia)
13.630	Interradio Romania	(Romania)						(Romania)
13.690	Radio France Internationale	(France) Issoudun	16:00-17:00	1234567	Hausa	500	170	(France)
13.730	Interradio Romania	(Romania)						(Romania)
13.740	Interradio Romania	(Romania)			Russian			(Romania)
13.790	Interradio Romania	(Romania) Tiganesti-Saftica	10:00-10:57	1234567	French	300	247	(Romania)
13.800	Golos And	(Germany) Nauen	15:30-16:30		Russian			(Germany)
13.825	Radio Vatican	Rome	12:30- 12:50		Russian	250kW	VA	
14.996	RWM Etalon Vremeni	(Russia) Taldom	?	?	Russian	8	?	(Russia)
15.130	Interradio Romania	(Romania) Tiganesti-Saftica	10:00-10:57	1234567	French	300	247	(Romania)
15.220	Interradio Romania (Digital)	(Romania) Tiganesti	04:00-04:27	1234567	Chinese	250	67	(Romania)
15.255	Interradio Romania	(Romania)						(Romania)
15.260	Interradio Romania							
15.380	Interradio Romania							
15.390	Radio Exterior de Espana	(Spain) Noblejas	18:00-22:00	1234567	Spanish	200	161	(Spain)
15.400	Interradio Romania							
15.430	Interradio Romania							
15.450	Interradio Romania							
15.460	Interradio Romania							
15.520	Radio Exterior de Espana	(Spain) Noblejas	14:00-18:00, 18:00-22:00	1.....7, 1234567	Spanish	200	110	(Spain)
15.785	bit eXpress	(Germany) Erlangen	00:00-00:00	1234567	German	0.1	ND	(Germany)
~~17.605~~	~~Adventist World Radio~~	~~(Austria) Moosbrunn~~	~~14:30-15:00~~	~~1234567~~	~~Afar~~	~~300~~	~~140~~	~~(Austria)~~
17.620	Radio France Internationale	(France) Issoudun	18:00-19:00	1234567	French	500	175	(France)
17.640	Radio Free Asia	(Germany) Lampertheim	11:00-12:00	1234567	Tibetan	100	77	(Germany)
17.670	Interradio Romania	(Romania) Galbeni	11:00-11:57	1234567	English	300	165	(Romania)
17.715	Radio Exterior de Espana	(Spain) Noblejas	14:00-18:00, 18:00-22:00	1.....7, 1234567	Spanish	200	230	(Spain)
17.745	Interradio Romania	(Romania)						(Romania)
17.750	Interradio Romania	(Romania) Tiganesti	07:00-07:56	1......	Romanian, Curierul romances	300	112	(Romania)
17.755	Interradio Romania							
17.760	Interradio Romania							
17.780	Interradio Romania							
17.770	Radio Xoriyo Ogaden	(France) Issoudun	16:00-16:30	.2...6.	Somali	500	130	(France) OGM
17.800	Interradio Romania	(Romania)						(Romania)
17.810	Interradio Romania	(Romania)						(Romania)
17.830	Radio Farda	(Germany) Biblis	08:30-15:30	1234567	Persian	100	85	(Germany)
17.850	Radio France Internacionale	(France) Issoudun	18:00-19:00	1234567	French	500	155	(France)
17.855	Radio Exterior de Espana	(Spain) Noblejas	14:00-18:00, 18:00-22:00	1.....7, 1234567	Spanish	200	290	(Spain)
21.490	Interradio Romania	(Romania) Tiganesti-Saftica	12:00-12:57	1234567	English	300	127	(Romania)
21.500	Interradio Romania	(Romania) Tiganesti	05:30-05:57	1234567	English	300	97	(Romania)
21.580	Radio France Internationale	(France) Issoudun	08:00-09:00	1234567	French	500	150	(France)
21.620	Radio Exterior de Espana	(Spain) Noblejas	14:00-18:00	1.....7	Spanish	200	161	(Spain)
21.690	Radio France Internationale	(France) Issoudun	16:00-17:00	1234567	French	500	185	(France) RFI
25.000	MIKES Aikamerkki	(Finland) Espoo	?	?	Finnish	-	-	(Finland)
25.900	Zeleniy Glaz	(Russia) Moscow	?	?	Russian	?	?	(Russia)
26.060	Railway Roma (DRM)	(Italy) Rome	?	?	Italian (Digital)	?	?	(Italy)

== Former stations ==
Those are former prominent SW transmitters:

Frequency (MHz)	Program	Transmitter site	Power	Transmission aerial	Remarks
4.485	Radio Rossii Ufa	(Russia) Yazykovo	?	20 m	-
5.015	Radio Rossii Pomorye	(Russia) Arkhangelsk	40 W	38 m	-
5.93	Radio Rossii Murman	(Russia) Monchegorsk	50 kW	?	-
5.93	ČRo 7	Pohodlí (CZ)	100 kW	?	
6.01	Radio Belarus	(Belarus) Brest	5 kW	?	-
6.055	ČRo 7	Pohodlí (CZ)	100 kW	?	
6.155	?	(Belarus)	?	?	-
6.200	ČRo 7	Pohodlí (CZ)	100 kW	?	
6.16	Radio Rossii Pomorye	(Russia) Arkhangelsk	40 W	38 m	-
6.07	Radio Belarus	(Belarus) Brest	5 kW	?	-
6.08	?	(Belarus)	?	?	-
7.255	?	(Belarus)	?	?	-
7.265	Kanal Kultura	(Belarus) Grodno	2,5 kW	?	-
7.345	ČRo 7	Pohodlí (CZ)	100 kW	?	
9.87	ČRo 7	Pohodlí (CZ)	100 kW		
9.88	ČRo 7	Pohodlí (CZ)	100 kW	?	
11.6	ČRo 7	Pohodlí (CZ)	100 kW	?	
11.615	ČRo 7	Pohodlí (CZ)	100 kW	?	
11.73	?	(Belarus)	?	?	-
11.93	?	(Belarus)	?	?	-
13.58	ČRo 7	Pohodlí (CZ)	100 kW	?	
15.62	ČRo 7	Pohodlí (CZ)	100 kW	?	
17.485	ČRo 7	Pohodlí (CZ)	100 kW	?	
21.745	ČRo 7	Pohodlí (CZ)	100 kW	?	
49m/25m	Radio Rossii Perm	(Russia) Perm	5 kW	-	(Russia) RS3

The above radio stations broadcast in the wavebands of 75, 60, 49, 41, 31, 25, 22, 19, 16 and/or 11 meters.

== See also ==
- List of shortwave radio broadcasters
