= Scandinavian Weekend Radio =

Virrat; Finland
- Frequencies: MW: 1602 kHz; SW: 11690, 11720, 6170, 5980 kHz; FM: 94.9 MHz

Programming
- Languages: Finnish, English
- Format: Independent

Ownership
- Owner: Vaihtoehtoisen radiotoiminnan tukiyhdistys ry

History
- First air date: July 2, 2000

Technical information
- Power: 0.1 kW (SW) 0.4 kW (MW)
- Transmitter coordinates: 62°22′40″N 23°37′25″E

Links
- Website: www.swradio.net

Scandinavian Weekend Radio (SWR) is a shortwave and medium wave radio station in Virrat, Finland, established in 2000. It broadcasts for 24 hours on the first Saturday of every month and on Christmas Day. It is the only shortwave and medium wave radio station in Finland.

The station is run by volunteers of which many are amateur radio operators, DXers and former pirate radio operators. Funding comes from membership fees of the voluntary association and PR product sales. Even though SWR is a commercial station, there are just a few advertisers.
