= WNYW (shortwave) =

Radio station in Massachusetts, 1927–1973

Coordinates: 42.20858°N 70.73713°W

WNYW (Radio New York Worldwide) was a shortwave (also known as High Frequency) International Broadcast radio station, that transmitted from Scituate, Massachusetts, United States. During World War II, the station became important for the British and the Norwegian information services. On October 20, 1973, Family Stations, Inc., acquired the station to be part of its Family Radio network and changed the call letters to WYFR. Family Stations eventually progressively moved the transmitters to their current site in Okeechobee, Florida. The transmitter site in Scituate continued to operate until November 16, 1979, when it was switched off for the last time.

== History ==
WNYW traced its origin to experimental station 2XAL, first licensed in 1927 to the Experimenter Publishing Company of New York City, with a transmitter site in nearby Coytesville, New Jersey. In 1928, as part of a process to add "international" prefixes, the call sign was changed to W2XAL.

Experimental Publishing also operated a standard radio station, WRNY. In 1929, Experimental Publishing was forced into involuntary receivership. In 1931, Walter S. Lemmon, who had been on the engineering staff of WRNY, acquired W2XAL, and relocated it to Boston, Massachusetts. Because the move was from the second to the first Radio Inspection district, the station's call sign was changed to W1XAL.

That same year, the World Wide Broadcasting Corporation, headed by Lemmon, was organized in Delaware, and largely financed by the Rockefeller Foundation. The station began transmitting non-commercial, educational, and cultural programs. Supported by charitable institutions, it was operated as a not-for-profit enterprise. Programming originated from a studio located at Harvard University. At this time there were not yet any FM or TV stations. Although many of the early AM-band radio stations had been established by educational institutions, their numbers had quickly declined, and by 1936 only consisted of a small number of mostly low powered stations. W1XAL was unique, being the country's only surviving educational shortwave station c. 1937.

Four days after Britain and France declared war on Germany on September 7, 1939, the Federal Communications Commission (FCC) assigned call letters WRUL (for "World Radio University Listeners") to the station. As it had a large worldwide listening audience, which regularly corresponded with the station and a high power transmitter it was seen by British Security Co-ordination (BSC), a covert organization that the British Secret Intelligence Service established in New York City as a vehicle for conducting political warfare on behalf of the British. The station was transmitting mostly in English so BSC provided through third parties the finance, translators, and foreign language announcers to produce high-quality programming in other languages. BSC also provided the material to be broadcast and so by 1941 WRUL had become unknowingly an arm of the BSC though outwardly independent and believing itself to be so.

From 1939 to 1942, WRUL broadcast radio lectures to Europe and South America in eight languages, and also in the United States over an informal network of over 300 stations, including WNYC in New York City. Following the establishment of what would become the OSS, American propaganda was provided to the station, but it was not until the entry of the US into the war that BSC handed over control. Like all United States shortwave stations, in November 1942 the U.S. government leased WRUL for further wartime propaganda broadcasts. WRUL was allowed to resume partial independent programming in 1947, and full independent programming in 1954.

From September 1940 and continuing through World War II, the Norwegian government had a daily half hour transmission in Norwegian for the sailors in the Norwegian commercial fleet. One broadcaster was the photojournalist Kari Berggrav.

Metromedia bought the station in 1960. In June 1962, International Educational Broadcasting Corporation (now Bonneville International), owned by the Church of Jesus Christ of Latter-day Saints, bought WRUL. The station adopted the slogan "Radio New York Worldwide" and used studios in New York City and an adult contemporary format, with ABC Radio or CBS Radio hourly and half-hour newscasts and from its sister station, WRFM. On-air staff from WRFM would also have separate shifts on WRUL. During the Hootenanny era of 1963 and 1964, WRUL broadcast a live folk music interview show, Folk Music Worldwide, hosted by Alan Wasser, one of WRUL's regular newsmen.

There were rumors that the station was being partially controlled by the Central Intelligence Agency to broadcast anti-communist propaganda.

On June 1, 1966, WRUL changed its call letters to WNYW, which stood for "Radio New York Worldwide". The station attempted to do some commercial programming, but there were few advertisers because it was difficult to estimate audience ratings for the wide geographical area that shortwave stations typically covered.

In 1970, Bonneville offered to sell the station to the U.S. government for a token payment of one dollar, for use by the Voice of America, but no sale materialized.

In 1974, Bonneville sold WNYW. The callsign would eventually be adopted by the Fox Broadcasting Company's flagship station, WNYW (formerly Metromedia station WNEW-TV and DuMont Television Network station WABD) in New York City, in 1986.
