= WYFR =

- Okeechobee, Florida; United States
- Broadcast area: Worldwide
- Branding: Family Radio

Programming
- Language: English
- Format: Defunct (was Gospel)

Ownership
- Owner: Family Radio; (Family Stations, Inc.)

History
- First air date: October 15, 1927
- Last air date: July 1, 2013 (85 years, 8 months and 16 days)
- Former call signs: W2XAL (1927–1929); W1XAL (1929–1939); WRUL (1939–1966); WNYW (1966–1973)
- Call sign meaning: "We're Your Family Radio"

Technical information
- Facility ID: 20793
- Transmitter coordinates: 27°27′30″N 80°56′0″W

Links
- Website: Family Radio

WYFR was a shortwave radio station located in Okeechobee, Florida, United States. The station was owned by Family Stations, Inc., as part of the Family Radio network, and used to broadcast traditional Christian radio programming to international audiences. WYFR ceased all shortwave transmissions July 1, 2013. In December 2013, another shortwave broadcaster, WRMI of Miami, purchased the WYFR transmission complex.

== History ==
WYFR was descended from W1XAL, an experimental shortwave station in that was granted its license in 1927 and broadcast from Boston until 1936 when the station moved to Scituate, Massachusetts. In 1939, the call letters were changed to WRUL and initially served as an educational station broadcasting university lectures. During World War II it became a propaganda station and was leased by the US government from 1942 until the end of the war. The station became WNYW in 1966.

In 1973, it was purchased by Family Stations, Inc, and began broadcasting as WYFR on October 20, 1973. The call sign stands for "We're Your Family Radio". The station built new transmitters in Okeechobee, Florida in 1977, and closed the Scituate site in 1979. In mid-2013 Family Radio announced it would be permanently closing WYFR on June 30, 2013. The station did in fact close but was purchased by WRMI and brought back to the air in December 2013.

The interval signal of WYFR was a brass quintet playing the first eight bars of "To God Be the Glory".

=== Radio Taiwan International ===
Radio Taiwan International leased broadcast time on WYFR from Family Radio. After 5 p.m. or 6 p.m. until sometime the next morning Eastern Time Zone (depending on Daylight Saving Time), WYFR broadcast RTI programming in English, Mandarin, Cantonese, Hakka, and Spanish. These broadcasts also ended on July 1, 2013. Family Radio, however, continued to host RTI's audio service to the Chinese community in the New York City area on a digital subchannel of Family Radio's television station, WNYJ-TV, until that station ceased operations on October 25, 2017.
