= KVOH =

- Rancho Simi, California; United States
- Broadcast area: Los Angeles; Southern USA; Cuba
- Frequencies: 9.975 MHz; 17.775 MHz
- Branding: Voice of Hope

Programming
- Languages: English, Spanish
- Format: Religious

Ownership
- Owner: Rev. John and Heather Otis Tayloe [sic]; (Strategic Communications Group)

History
- First air date: c. 1980
- Last air date: June 26, 2023
- Call sign meaning: Voice Of Hope

Technical information
- Power: 100 kW (source debatable)
- ERP: 50 kW
- Repeaters: 1287 kHz in Israel; 6.065 MHz in Zambia

Links
- Website: voiceofhope.com

KVOH The "Voice of Hope - Americas", owned and operated by Strategic Communications Group, was a non-commercial, 50 kW shortwave (SW) Christian/Gospel radio station located in Rancho Simi, California, though their studios are in Los Angeles, which they claim as their home city. Programming could be heard on 9.975 MHz and 17.775 MHz, often using two languages: English and Spanish.

== Signal ==
External videos
- Spanish reception of KVOH on 17.775 MHz from Edmonton, AB, YouTube video

The main KVOH signal is broadcast from their transmission facility on Chatsworth Peak in Southern California, with a signal of either 50 or 100 kilowatts of power; either signal claims to have a 100-degree lobe pointed at Cuba, which would also cover much of Mexico, the Caribbean, and the Southern United States.

KVOH's parent organization, Strategic Communications Group, maintains other signals on mediumwave and shortwave, with apparent Middle East reception on 1287 AM from Voice of Hope - Israel (AM), as well as from the Voice of Hope - Africa, broadcasting on two transmitters located in Zambia, Africa on 6.065 MHz. Despite this, parts of Northeast Africa do not receive a signal.

=== Programming ===
The schedule at KVOH consists of either religious speakers like Lorenzo Martinez (former musician based in Los Angeles), a daily devotional, or Christian music. Also, Rev. John and Heather Tayloe's Nightwatch broadcast each evening.

== History ==
The station website notes that it has broadcast programming on 9.975 MHz for "over 30 years". The original station was founded by the late Dr. George Otis starting in 1985. KVOH was testing on 17.775 MHz during August and September 2011. Today, Rev. John and Heather Otis Tayloe, Strategic Communications Group, operate KVOH (Voice of Hope - Americas) in an effort to share the Gospel of Jesus by shortwave radio.

KVOH ceased operation June 26, 2023, citing the cost of electricity in California.
