= KTBN (shortwave) =

Coordinates: 40.650°N 112.046°W

KTBN-SW
Salt Lake City, Utah; United States
- Broadcast area: North America
- Branding: SuperPower KTBN

Programming
- Format: Defunct (was religious radio)

Ownership
- Owner: Trinity Broadcasting Network

History
- First air date: December 26, 1987
- Last air date: March 30, 2008 (17 years ago)
- Call sign meaning: Trinity Broadcasting Network (the station's owner)

Technical information
- Power: 100,000 watts

Links
- Website: http://www.tbn.org

KTBN (formerly known as KUSW) was the shortwave radio outlet of the Trinity Broadcasting Network, a large religious international broadcaster. The station's programming was a simulcast of the audio portion of the TBN television service.

== History ==
KUSW, which was also branded "The Superpower", officially launched on December 26, 1987, during the peak years of the American commercial shortwave broadcasting boom triggered by the founding of WRNO Worldwide. Owned by Carlson Communications International, which owned a network of AM and FM stations in Utah, Nevada, and Arizona, KUSW broadcast a combination of news and rock music. The station also carried selected Utah Jazz games and offered a mail-order catalog of products made in the Rocky Mountains. The station's "theme song", used as an interval signal for sign-ons, sign-offs, and to signal frequency changes, was "Telegraph Road" by Dire Straits.

Carlson sold the station to the TBN ministry in 1990 for approximately $2 million. The station signed off under its old format on December 16 of that year, and relaunched under the KTBN call sign two days later. To celebrate the format and ownership change, TBN founders Paul and Jan Crouch staged a televised demolition, in which a false representation of KUSW's former library of rock albums was exploded in a Disco Demolition Night-esque manner.

As early as June 2004, KTBN broadcast warnings that it would leave the air due to a "lack of [listener] response". Although the station continued for several years after these announcements, pages dedicated to the KTBN shortwave service were deleted from the TBN website in 2005. The station ceased operations on March 30, 2008.

After its final sign-off, the station equipment, including the transmitter and antenna array, was dismantled and shipped to Anguilla in the Caribbean to be incorporated into the Caribbean Beacon radio station.

== Frequencies ==
At the time of its last broadcasts, KTBN could be heard on the following frequencies:

- English to North America: 7.505 MHz from 0100 to 1500 UTC; 15.59 MHz from 1500 to 0100 UTC.

== See also ==
- Trinity Broadcasting Network
- International broadcasting
- Shortwave Radio
