= Oldies =

Musical genres from the second half of the 20th century

Oldies is a term for musical genres such as pop music, rock and roll, doo-wop, surf music from the second half of the 20th century, specifically from around the mid-1950s to the late 1960s, as well as for a radio format playing this music.

Since 2000, 1970s music has been increasingly included in this genre. "Classic hits" have been seen as a successor to the oldies format on the radio, with music from the 1980s serving as the core example.

== Description ==
This category includes styles as diverse as doo-wop, early rock and roll, novelty songs, bubblegum music, folk rock, psychedelic rock, baroque pop, surf music, soul music, rhythm and blues, classic rock, some blues and some country music.

Golden Oldies usually refers to music exclusively from the 1950s and 1960s. Oldies radio typically features artists such as Elvis Presley, Chuck Berry, The Beatles, Jerry Lee Lewis, The Beach Boys, Frankie Avalon, The Four Seasons, Paul Anka, Neil Sedaka, Little Richard and Sam Cooke; as well as such musical movements and genres as early rock and roll, rockabilly, doo-wop, soul music, Motown, British Invasion, early girl groups, surf music, teen idol singers, teenage tragedy songs and bubblegum pop. Music from the folk revival and instrumental beautiful music are among the most commonly excluded recordings from the Oldies era.

Most traditional Oldies stations limit their on-air playlists to no more than 300 songs, based on the programming strategy that average listeners and passive listeners will stay tuned provided they are familiar with the hits being played. A drawback to this concept is the constant heavy rotation and repetition of the station's program library, as well as rejection of the format by active listeners. This can be avoided either through the use of a broader playlist or by rotating different songs from the Oldies era into and out of the playlist every few weeks.

Oldies has some overlap with the classic hits and classic rock formats. Classic hits features pop and rock hits from the early 1970s to early 1990s, while classic rock focuses on album rock from the late 1960s to 1990s (sometimes playing newer material made in the same style as the older songs). As formats have drifted in time with their target audiences, classic hits and classic rock have moved further away from pure Oldies, which has largely remained a static format.

In the early days of the rock era, the term Oldies referred to the traditional pop songs of previous decades; a 1953 record review in Billboard describes 1925's "Yes Sir, That's My Baby" as an Oldie. Oldies is known for the near-total and sometimes arbitrary exclusion of some acts that were very popular in their time, including The Osmonds and Barbra Streisand.

== Classic hits format ==
A variation on the Oldies theme is classic hits, which provides most of the playlist of Oldies with some classic rock with an addition of contemporaneous R&B and pop hits as well, creating a balance between the mostly 1970s-focused classic rock genre and the more broad-based Oldies format. The evolution of Oldies into classic hits is an example of channel drift.

== Radio history ==
=== 20th century ===
The Oldies format began to appear in the early 1970s. KOOL-FM in Phoenix became one of the first radio stations to play Oldies music, at that time focusing on the 1950s and early 1960s.

In the 1960s, very few top 40 radio stations played anything more than a few years old. In the late 1960s, a few FM stations adopted top 40 formats that leaned towards adults who did not want to hear the same 30 songs repetitively but also did not want to hear music featured on Middle of the road radio stations. They mixed in Oldies with their current product and only played new music a few times an hour. These radio stations were often referred to as "gold" stations. Some AM radio stations also began to employ this format. There were also syndicated music format packages such as Drake-Chenault's "Solid Gold" format, frequently used on FM stations that needed separate programming from their AM sisters (due to then-new FCC rules on simulcasting), that functioned as a hybrid of Oldies and the adult-oriented softer rock hits of the day. The popularity of the movie American Graffiti is often credited with helping to spur the 1950s nostalgia movement of the early 1970s. It is this movement that gave rise to a number of gold-based stations, such as WHND/WHNE (Honey Radio) in Detroit, WCBS-FM in New York City, WQSR in Baltimore, and WROR in Boston, that were classified as Oldies stations and not adult top 40. These stations, did play current product sparingly (one or two per hour) throughout the 1970s and into the 1980s; WCBS-FM, for example, played current hits under the moniker "Future Gold" through the late 1980s, and WLNG on nearby Long Island featured a roughly 50/50 mix of current hits and Oldies from the early 1960s until about 1999.

Most of these "Solid Gold" stations began to either evolve into other formats or drop the format altogether in the late 1970s and early 1980s. Most AM gold stations flipped to other formats. Some FM stations evolved into adult contemporary stations, including WROR in Boston and WFYR in Chicago. In the early 1980s many AC stations began mixing in more Oldies into regular rotation and aired Oldies shows on Saturday nights.

Beginning in 1982, both AM and FM stations began changing to full-time Oldies formats. These stations played strictly music from 1955 to 1973, focusing on the 1964–1969 era. Among these Oldies stations were WNBC in New York City before 1988, WDRC-FM in Hartford, Connecticut, WODS in Boston, WOGL in Philadelphia, KLUV in Dallas, WWSW in Pittsburgh, WJMK in Chicago, and CHUM in Toronto. Some had as few as 300 songs while stations like WODS and WOGL had as many as 1,500 songs in regular rotation. By 1989, most large and medium markets had at least one, usually FM, Oldies station.

This period also saw the rise of syndicated radio shows specifically aimed at an Oldies format. They included Soundtrack of the 1960s with Murray the K, Dick Clark's Rock, Roll & Remember, Live from the '60s with The Real Don Steele, Cruisin' America with Cousin Brucie, and Rock & Roll's Greatest Hits with Dick Bartley. Most of these shows were three hours long and featured much of the same music from the 1950s, 1960s and 1970s that was in rotation at affiliate stations. All but a few of these shows had ended their run by the mid-1990s, though Bartley's ran into the late 2000s (and eventually returned for several years in the late 2010s) while Clark's show continued until his 2004 stroke and in reruns until 2020.

From 1986 to 1990 several solid gold stations evolved into full-time Oldies stations by eliminating current and recent product while also gradually eliminating 1980s songs and limiting 1970s songs substantially. KRTH and WQSR both did this in the late 1980s into the early 1990s. WCBS-FM however continued playing current product in regular rotation until 1988. After that, they played it once an hour between 11pm and 5:30am, until 2001. WCBS-FM also played several 1990s songs per shift during these overnight hours. They also continued to play between one 1980s song every couple of hours to as many as two per hour day and night. WCBS-FM also played from three to five songs per hour from the 1970s. They indeed played more 1970s music than any other notable Oldies station. At the same time, WCBS-FM featured slightly more pre 1964 songs than the average station playing as many as five of those per hour.

Oldies stations continued to be late 1960s based throughout the 1990s. WCBS-FM was an exception. Most AM Oldies stations also disappeared by the early 1990s except in markets where there was no FM oldies outlet. The format fared well with no end in sight.

=== 21st century ===
Beginning in 2000, Oldies stations began to notice that their demographics were getting older and harder to sell. Still, at that time only a few stations dumped the format altogether. A few, such as Orlando's WOCL and Sacramento's KHYL shifted to the briefly popular and more disco-centric rhythmic oldies format; most others continued to hang onto the format initially.

Since around 2000, stations have begun to limit selections from the 1950s and early 1960s. At the same time, these stations began playing songs from as late as 1979 and even a few 1980s songs. WCBS-FM New York slightly cut back on the pre-1964 oldies and slightly increased the 1970s and 1980s songs early in 2001. They also eliminated the overnight currents at the same time along with some specialty shows.

In 2002, many Oldies stations began dropping pre-1964 music from their playlists, since the earlier music tended to appeal to an older demographic that advertisers found undesirable—hence, the addition of music from the 1970s and early 1980s. WCBS-FM canceled their "Doo Wop Shop" program and began playing only one pre-1964 oldie per hour; by 2003, there were fewer than 50 songs from the 1950s and early 1960s in their regular rotation.

Many stations have since dropped the Oldies format because of low ad revenue despite high ratings. On June 3, 2005, New York City's WCBS-FM, an Oldies-based station for over three decades, abruptly switched to the Jack FM format, resulting in a tremendous outcry from Oldies fans in the Big Apple and a huge decline in revenue followed. WJMK in Chicago (WCBS-FM's sister station) switched to Jack FM on the same day. Some point to the demise of WCBS-FM and WJMK as a sign that the Oldies format is in danger, for many of the same reasons that the adult standards and smooth jazz formats are disappearing.

The Oldies format returned to WCBS-FM on July 12, 2007, in an updated form featuring music from 1964 to 1989 without the word "Oldies", but rather "Greatest Hits" in the on-air positioning, with songs such as "Girls Just Want to Have Fun" by Cyndi Lauper, "Gloria" by Laura Branigan, and corporate rock hit "We Built This City" by Starship in rotation (though the original WCBS-FM played current hits mixed in with its Oldies as late as the late 1980s and the three songs mentioned here during most of their years).

By the mid-2010s, as the phrase "classic hits" came to entail a format centered around late 1970s (disco-era) and 1980s pop, dance and rock format, the phrase "Oldies" had come to entail a 1960s to mid-1970s format that centered mostly on soft rock and easy listening (akin to the old MOR format), examples including WRME-LD in Chicago. More upbeat 1960s and 1970s stations are known within the industry as "gold" classic hits. A decade later, in the mid-2020s, the classic hits format had effectively fully separated from oldies as classic hits had begun to encapsulate the hip-hop era of the late 1990s and early 21st century.

As of 2020, 1960s music is becoming increasingly rare on radio. Of the 1000 most played songs on radio as of May 2020, only four of them are from before 1970, and three of them also benefit from being aired on classic rock, Oldies, and classic hits stations. Of the 100 songs that suffered the most drop-off in popularity from their heyday to 2022, a majority were from the 1960s; 56% were from before the British Invasion and another 13% were from then to 1969. This is despite a small pantheon of songs from that era that have become part of an "eternal jukebox of all-ages event records," as well as parents and grandparents who had listened to the music when they were younger passing those songs on to their children; in the latter case, the older songs popular among the younger crowd can be more random, driven by exposure in television, film, commercials and person-to-person interactions.

== Oldies stations ==
The Oldies format remains one of the most popular formats on radio in markets where it is still active. Some of the most successful major-market Oldies stations today include KRTH "K-Earth 101" in Los Angeles, XHPRS-FM "105.7 the Walrus" in Tijuana-San Diego, KOLA 99.9 in Riverside-San Bernardino KYNO in Fresno, California, 98.1 WOGL in Philadelphia, WMJI "Majic 105.7" in Cleveland, and KSPF in Dallas. WLS-FM in Chicago, however, is similar to the way Oldies stations sounded several years back, still playing one or two pre-1964 songs an hour during the day and as many as four an hour at night.

However, to illustrate the continued decline in the format, San Francisco's KFRC moved toward Classic Hits in 2005 and dropped this format entirely in 2006 in favor of the Rhythmic AC "MOViN" format, which left most of Northern California without an oldies station until the debut of KCCL (K-Hits 92.1) in Sacramento in January 2007. However, KFRC had already evolved its format and positioning to classic hits at the time it changed to "Movin". But KFRC was not gone for long. On May 17, 2007, with Free FM hot talk format failing on 106.9 KIFR CBS relaunched KFRC with a rock leaning classic hits format on 106.9. But KFRC was not back for long either. On October 27, 2008, 106.9 KFRC FM became an all news 740 KCBS AM simulcast. KFRC now only airs on 106.9 FM HD-2 and online at KFRC.com. But KFRC came back again. On January 1, 2009, KFRC returned on the radio at 1550 AM, as true Oldies.

KZQZ, which aired in St. Louis, and began playing Oldies in March 2008, held onto the traditional Oldies format, playing a wide variety of top 40 Billboard hits from the 1950s, 1960s, and early 1970s, until the FCC forced the station off the air in 2020. Non-commercial WXRB, 95.1 FM in Dudley, Massachusetts (one of the first non-commercial all-Oldies stations in North America) began playing Golden Oldies on March 6, 2005, at 1:00pm, focusing on the years 1954 through 1979.

On August 27, 2009, Grand Rapids, Michigan station WGVU became the first public radio station to feature an all-Oldies format. The format has since been imitated by other public radio stations; for example, WCNY-FM in Syracuse, New York has begun broadcasting a personality-based oldies format on its HD Radio digital subchannel.

Jones Radio Networks, Waitt Radio Networks and Transtar Radio Networks also offered 24-hour satellite-distributed Oldies formats; since those companies have integrated into the Dial Global corporation, the networks have merged into one, Kool Gold. Satellite Music Network offered "Oldies Radio", which survived until its acquisition by ABC but has since rebranded as Classic Hits Radio under current owner Cumulus Media Networks, focusing on music primarily from the 1970s and 1980s, with some limited 1960s music.

ABC also offered The True Oldies Channel, a 24-hour Oldies network programmed and voice tracked at all hours by Scott Shannon, at the time morning show host at ABC's WPLJ. The True Oldies Channel was conceived on the concept of avoiding the drift into 1970s and 1980s music that the Oldies format was undergoing in the first years of the 21st century. Eventually, by the end of the network's terrestrial run in 2014, it had taken a hybrid approach, with both 1960s and 1970s music being featured at the core of the network, with some limited 1980s music included.

In North America, satellite radio broadcasters XM and Sirius launched in 2001 and 2002, respectively, with more than a dozen Oldies radio channels, with XM offering separate stations for each decade from the 1940s to the 1990s, and Sirius doing the same for the 1950s through the 1980s, initially all in prime single-digit channel positions. These companies also offered specific genre channels for disco and dance hits, garage rock, classic rock, classic country, and vintage R&B and soul hits. These pay radio channels boasted thousands of songs in their libraries, ensuring far less repetition than traditional broadcast stations. In November 2008, following a merger of Sirius and XM, the two services shifted to a unified group of decades channels, with the playlists for most cut back to reflect a more conventional style of Oldies programming. SiriusXM further marginalized its Oldies stations over the years, moving its 1940s channel off channel 4 in 2015, then in 2021 by moving its 1950s and 1960s channels out of their 5 and 6 channel slots respectively. Music Choice similarly offers an interruption-free Oldies station, which includes music from the 1950s, 1960s, and decades channels for the 1970s through the 1990s. A number of Internet radio stations also carry the format.

From the late 2010s until 2022, shortwave radio station WTWW operated an Oldies service in the evening hours. In November 2022, WTWW lead engineer Ted Randall left the station and took the Oldies programming to a dedicated transmitter on WRMI a short distance down the dial from WTWW on the 60-meter band.
