= WTWW =

- Lebanon, Tennessee; United States
- Broadcast area: Canada, Europe, Middle East, Asia, Africa
- Frequency: 5.085 MHz
- Branding: Scriptures for America

Programming
- Language: English
- Format: Religious
- Affiliations: Scriptures For America

Ownership
- Owner: Leap of Faith, Inc.; (George McClintock, chairman)

History
- First air date: February 19, 2010
- Last air date: November 10, 2022 (shortwave service)
- Former call signs: WBWW (during construction)
- Call sign meaning: We Transmit World Wide

Technical information
- Facility ID: IHFC/P-20080122
- Class: HF Broadcasting
- Power: 100,000 watts
- Transmitter coordinates: 36°16′35″N 86°5′58″W

Links
- Webcast: Listen Live
- Website: WTWW.org

WTWW is a shortwave station located in Lebanon, Tennessee. It is officially licensed to Leap of Faith, Inc. and leased mostly to Scriptures for America, a service produced by LaPorte Church of Christ. The station has sporadically operated since 2023 on three frequencies: 5.085, 9.475, and 9.93 MHz due to frequent equipment failures, a persistent problem throughout the station's history.

Until 2022, WTWW had also carried an oldies/classic hits format operated by the station's then-lead engineer Ted Randall, who also appeared on several programs on the station, and his wife Holly on the 5.085 MHz and 9.94 MHz frequencies. WTWW went off-air November 10, 2022, with Randall taking the oldies format to WRMI; the station returned to the air sporadically in December solely carrying Scriptures for America.

== History ==
WTWW, according to the FCC, was originally licensed a construction permit as WBWW on June 30, 2009. Testing began in January 2010 and ending mid-February 2010. Testing frequencies used were 5.755 MHz and 9.48 MHz, and recorded by several listeners who uploaded the audio to YouTube. WTWW officially signed on at 15:00 UTC on Friday, February 19, 2010 using the 9.48 MHz frequency with low power and streaming with programming from the Scriptures for America broadcast networkart of a [ Both the frequencies 5.755 MHz and 9.48 MHz and their transmitters were previously used by Christian shortwave outlet KAIJ in Dallas, Texas.

In January 2010, WTWW (as WBWW) was licensed to operate at 100 kilowatts with an azimuth of 40 degrees, every day, on 5.755 MHz from 00:00 to 07:00 UTC and on 9.48 MHz from 12:00 to 19:00 and 22:00 to 24:00 UTC, targeting CIRAF zones 4 and 9 (eastern Canada); 18, 27, & 28 (Europe); 37, & 38 (north Africa), 39 (the Middle East); and 46 & 47 (western and central Africa).

In 2015, WTWW briefly served as the terrestrial broadcast home of Art Bell's overnight radio program Midnight in the Desert.

=== The Big One on 5085 ===
From August 2018 to 2022, WTWW's lead engineer Ted Randall operated a locally originated personality oldies format on the 5.085 MHz signal in the evenings, with veteran disc jockeys and voiceover artists to host the programming. Among its hosts was famed sound engineer Bob Heil, who hosted an hour of "Live Theater Organ from the Ozarks." WTWW disc jockeys worked unpaid for the station, broadcasting remotely from their homes. In a 2017 interview with The Spectrum Monitor, Randall described his arrangement with WTWW as a barter agreement with its owners, providing engineering services in exchange for the right to use the WTWW transmitters for music and amateur radio programming as he saw fit, akin to a local marketing agreement.

=== Temporary shutdown and departure of The Big One ===
On November 9, 2022, Randall announced his departure from the station, eventually taking the station's programming to a WRMI transmitter five days later. The station briefly shut down after Randall's departure. WTWW sporadically returned to the air December 22, carrying Scriptures for America on the 5.085 (and eventually 9.475) frequencies.

As of January 2025, WTWW's 5.085 and 9.475 frequencies were off the air, according to Glenn Hauser, whose syndicated World of Radio was re-added after Randall's departure; Hauser did record operations on 9.93 carrying repeats of Brother Stair.

Randall died May 11, 2025.

== Programming ==
Scriptures for America operates primarily as an outlet for the pre-recorded sermons of LaPorte Church of Christ founder Peter J. Peters (who died in 2011 shortly after the station began broadcasting) and his successors. The Anti-Defamation League has identified Peters's programs as "bigoted pseudo-religious Christian Identity (and) antisemitism" and had attempted to take stations that had carried the program at the time (before WTWW had signed on) to be subjected to FCC investigations for broadcasting to domestic audiences, as the ADL argued such programs had no relevance outside the United States.

LaPorte had also previously offered The Bible Worldwide, which offered audiobook broadcasts of the Holy Bible in various languages (with the King James Version being used for English readings), when WTWW had an additional frequency to spare. During his time with the station, Randall commented that the transmitter carrying The Bible Worldwide worked properly almost all of the time while the ones carrying Scriptures for America frequently malfunctioned, which Randall mused could have been a case of divine intervention.

As of October 2023, WTWW began accepting programming from other religious broadcasters under the guidance of Bob Biermann, including Biermann's talk show Truth2Ponder, which originates from WRMI. Beginning in July 2025, WTWW became the lone remaining affiliate of the Overcomer Ministry radio service, which was founded by the late Brother Stair; McClintock stated that his "understanding is that they will not be renewing contracts, presumably expiring on different dates at different stations" and that he was negotiating to keep the program on WTWW.
