= Lorenzo Martínez (musician) =

American musician

Lorenzo Martinez is an American musician who won the Grammy Award for Best Tejano Album in 2009, for his work with Los Texmaniacs on Borders Y Bailes.

He grew up in southeast Los Angeles and "took up the vihuela guitar and the guitarrón acoustic bass and began playing Mexican music. He studied mariachi at UCLA with Natividad Cano of Mariachi los Camperos. At the same time, he started playing Texan-style orquesta tejana and rhythm and blues in East Los Angeles." Lorenzo was a core member of Los Rock Angels and currently performs with Los Texmaniacs in San Antonio, Texas, and Conjunto Los Pochos in Los Angeles, California.
