= WINB =

Coordinates: 39°54′22″N 76°34′56″W

Red Lion, Pennsylvania; United States
- Frequency: 9.265 MHz

Programming
- Format: Brokered Christian radio

Ownership
- Owner: World International Broadcasters, Inc.

History
- First air date: July 27, 1962
- Call sign meaning: World International Broadcasters

Technical information
- Power: 50,000 watts

Links
- Website: winb.com

WINB is a brokered Christian shortwave radio station licensed to Red Lion, Pennsylvania, in the United States. WINB began broadcasting on July 27, 1962, making it the oldest private shortwave radio station in the United States that is still in operation. In the 1960s, the station was notable for its criticism of American domestic and foreign policy, leading to the government freezing the expansion of private shortwave radio transmission schedules for several years.
