= KGEI =

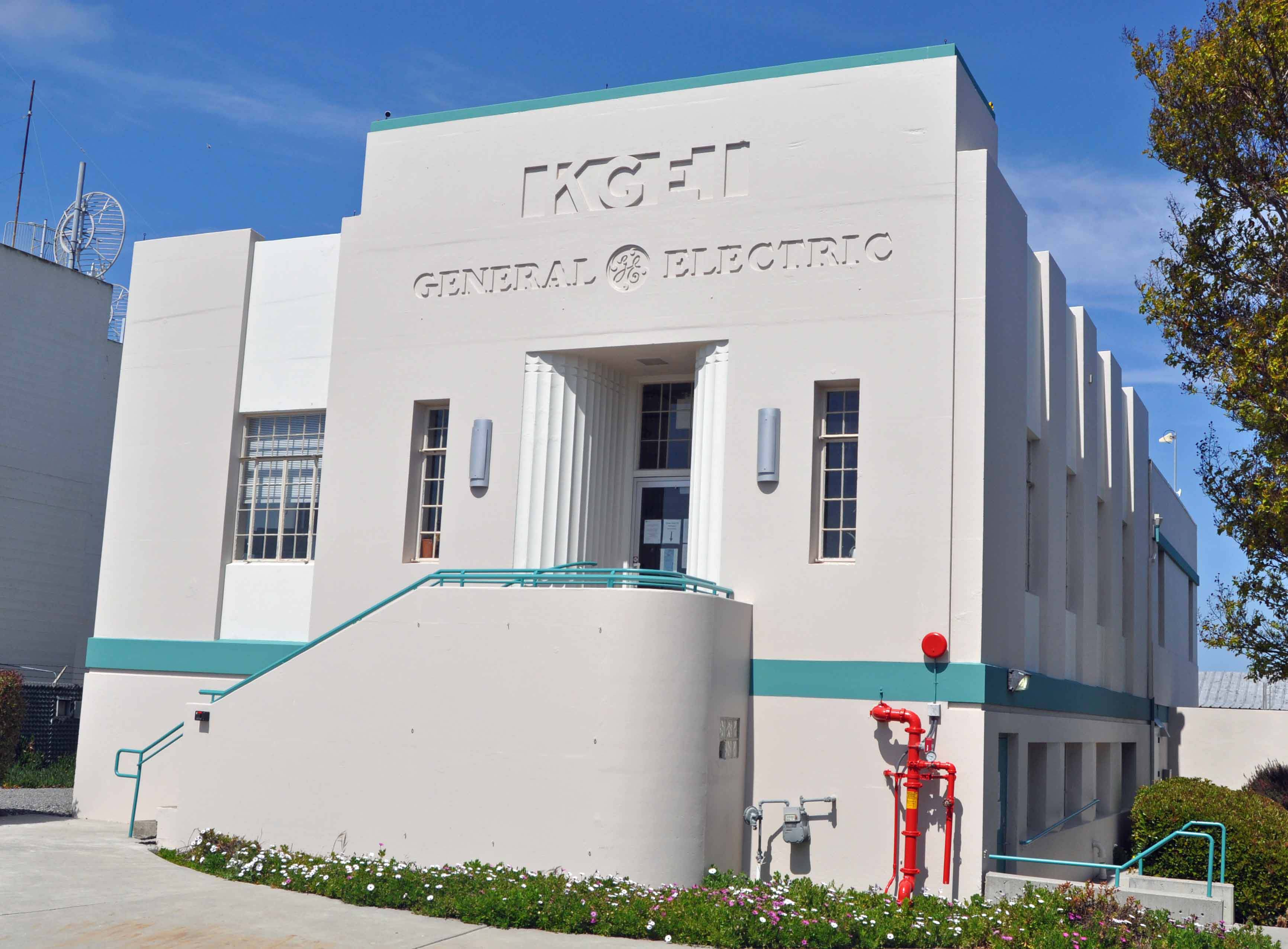
- KGEI building in Redwood Shores
- Redwood Shores, California; United States
- Broadcast area: Latin America, Asia
- Frequency: 9.625 MHz

Ownership
- Owner: Far East Broadcasting Company

History
- First air date: 1939
- Last air date: July 1994
- Call sign meaning: "General Electric International" (former owner)

Technical information
- Power: 250,000 watts

KGEI was a shortwave radio station founded by General Electric in 1939. It was purchased by the Far East Broadcasting Company in 1960.

== History ==
KGEI was founded by GE in 1939 at the Golden Gate International Exposition on Treasure Island with the call sign W6XBE, before changing to KGEI in August 1939. The station at this time had a 50 kW GE transmitter. In 1941, the station was relocated to Redwood City, California, following the end of exposition, right next door to today's KNBR. The transmitter building was built with reinforced concrete construction designed to withstand bombs.

Prior to World War II, the station aired isolationist programs such as those of Charles Lindbergh along with International News Service bulletins. During World War II, General Douglas MacArthur's "I have returned" speech was aired by KGEI.

During the years of 1954 and 1955, the station was used to air Stanford University's International University of the Air program. In 1960, the station was purchased by the Far East Broadcasting Company. In 1962, during the Cuban Missile Crisis, the station served as a temporary relay of the Voice of America. During the 1970s, a Missions Engineering 250 kW transmitter was added to the station along with log periodic antennas.

FEBC closed the station down in July 1994. The 50 kW transmitter was donated to the Christian missionary organization SIM for use in Liberia. However, it was destroyed during an attack on the facility shortly after its installation there. The 250 kW transmitter was also donated to a Christian organization, Project Aurora and was moved to Alaska. The transmitter building was sold to Fully Alive Church, who eventually sold the building to Silicon Valley Clean Water, a wastewater treatment plant, on adjacent property.
