= WRMI =

Coordinates: 27°27′30″N 80°56′0″W

- Okeechobee, Florida; United States
- Broadcast area: the Americas, the Caribbean, Europe, Africa, Middle East and Asia
- Frequency: See Frequencies
- Branding: Radio Miami International

Programming
- Languages: English; Spanish; Italian; French; Portuguese; Slovak
- Format: Brokered/Variety

Ownership
- Owner: Radio Miami International, Inc.; (Jeff White, co-founder/GM)

History
- First air date: June 14, 1994
- Call sign meaning: Radio Miami International

Links
- Webcast: TX3 Listen Live; TX4 (WRMI Legends) Listen Live
- Website: www.wrmi.net

WRMI (Radio Miami International) is a shortwave radio station broadcasting from Okeechobee, Florida, United States. WRMI is a commercial radio station that sells airtime to businesses and organizations.

== Programming ==
WRMI relays several international news stations including Radio Ukraine International, Radio Slovakia International, Radio Tirana, Radio France International, Famagusta Gazette Radio, Radio Prague, the Italian Broadcasting Corporation, NHK World Radio Japan, Radio Taiwan International, and Radiodifusión Argentina al Exterior, all of which, except for the last, would otherwise be difficult to receive in the Western Hemisphere. It also features headline news stories from the Voice of America, several religious programs (particularly those of Brother Stair and Ching Hai), as well as original and syndicated programs. According to its 1996 station record from the Federal Communications Commission, WRMI's broadcast target zones were the Caribbean, Central America and South America. In particular, much of its programming was targeted towards Cuba. With the addition of the former WYFR transmitters, WRMI had 14 transmitters with 23 antennas targeting many zones worldwide in 2016. Its broadcasts are also easily received in the United States and Canada. WRMI airs programs in English, Spanish, French, Portuguese, Italian, Ukrainian, Russian and Slovak. Since March 2022, WRMI has targeted daily native language programming to Ukraine and Russia regarding the on-going Russian invasion of Ukraine.

WRMI was nominated for "Most Popular Radio International Radio Station for 2024" by the Club de Diexistas sin Fronteras (DXers Without Borders Club), a club with a primarily Spanish and Portuguese speaking audience; the station finished in third place to Radio Taiwan International's Spanish service, with Dino Bloise winning the "Best (Male) Presenter" award from the same club.

=== WRMI Legends ===
In November 2022, WRMI added an evening block of personality oldies programming that had previously been aired on WTWW in Lebanon, Tennessee. The block, branded as "WRMI Legends," was forced off WTWW when that station shut down due to a number of factors earlier that month. WRMI Legends has operated on the 5050 kHz frequency, vacated by WWRB following the January 2022 death of its owner, since February 2023. WRMI Legends, like WTWW before it, largely targets a North American and European audience of DXers and Amateur Radio enthusiasts. The WRMI Legends programming block also carries “Ria’s Ham Shack,” an amateur radio focused talk show hosted by Ria Jairam, N2RJ, Sundays at 8PM Central. Jairam’s show was previously broadcast on Saturdays on WTWW.

WRMI Legends founder Ted Randall died May 11, 2025. His widow indicated that the service would continue.

=== Mighty KBC ===
In January 2023, WRMI absorbed another block of personality music programming from German/Dutch shortwave broadcaster The Mighty KBC Radio, which was forced to suspend operations due to an energy crisis in Europe.

== History ==
The station began broadcasting on June 14, 1994, with a 50,000-watt transmitter and two antennas located near Miami, Florida. In December 2013, they purchased the WYFR transmission complex from Family Radio in Okeechobee, Florida. This new facility includes a dozen 100,000-watt transmitters plus two 50,000-watt transmitters and several antennas to cover all parts of the world.

== Frequencies ==
WRMI currently, as of March 2026, broadcasts on the following frequencies in the following directions:

Band	Frequency (kHz)	Azimuth	Intended Audience	Hours (UTC)	Notes
16 m	17790		South America, Africa	1500–0200	
19 m	15770	44°	Europe, the Mediterranean	24/7	
31 m	9955	160°	Latin America	2200–0500; 1200–1600	Flagship frequency
31 m	9455	315°	North America	2300-0400	
31 m	9395	355°	Eastern North America	24/7	
41 m	7780	222°	Central America	0000–1200	
41 m	7730	44°	Eastern North America	24/7	
41 m	7570	285°	Western North America	0100–1200	
49 m	5950	355°	North America	0000–0500	Talk radio format
49 m	5850	315°	North America	2200–1300	
49 m	5800	160°	Caribbean and Central America	0100–0400	
60 m	5050	160°	North America, Cuba, Caribbean	0000–0500	
60 m	5010	181°	Cuba, the Caribbean and Central America	2300-0300	
