= Superrock KYOI =

Shortwave radio station in the Northern Mariana Islands

Coordinates: 15°07′16″N 145°41′35″E

Superrock KYOI was a short-wave US radio station located at Saipan island in the Pacific region from 1982 to 1989. The aim was to deliver broadcast rock and pop music to Japan, but due to short-wave distribution features it was also well-heard in the USSR, China, Australia, New Zealand, and some Pacific countries, where it became legendary.

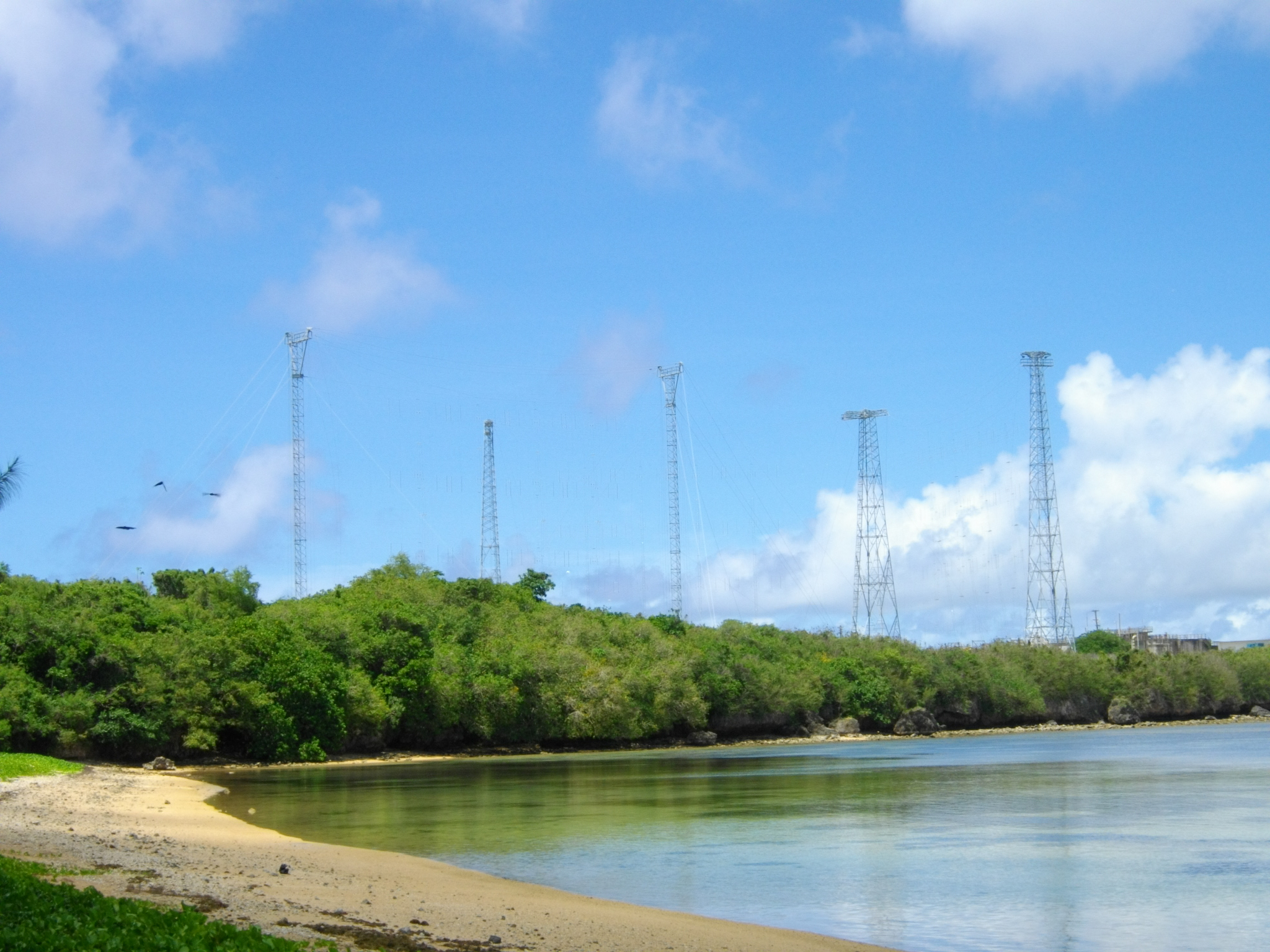
Broadcasting antenna at Agingan Point, Saipan.

== History ==
The idea for Superrock KYOI was first proposed in 1980, due to the popularity of shortwave radio in Japan, which led to the idea of using the medium of shortwave to satisfy Japanese teenagers' and young adults' appetite for Western pop and rock music, as the Western concept of Top-40 or Album Rock radio formats did not exist in Japan at the time. The station began transmitting December 17, 1982. Initial frequencies were 11.9, 15.19, 15.405, and 9.67 MHz. To promote a new standard of broadcasting, Superrock KYOI had a carefully selected name: "Super" having a very strong, positive meaning in Japan, and "YOI" meaning "good" in Japanese. With the slogan "Super Rock" and the promise of "rock and roll from L.A." (although the station's headquarters were located in Honolulu, Hawaii), it was an instant hit not only in the intended target area of Japan, but also, unexpectedly, with listeners worldwide. Enthusiasm did not extend to advertisers in either Japan or the United States, however, as the station found it very hard to sell time, and by late 1985 was soliciting donations from listeners to help keep the station on the air. This strategy ultimately did not produce the needed cash flow and KYOI was put up for sale a few months later.

In December 1986, the Herald Broadcasting division of the Christian Science Monitor Syndicate Inc. purchased KYOI. Although the station's Top 40/CHR format was initially retained, it was increasingly interrupted over the next few years by news and religious programming. The station also began referring to itself as "All Hit KYOI" during this time. Broadcasts of music programs were completely terminated in 1989 with the station's callsign changing to KHBI and the format changing to full-time religion. In 1998 HBS sold the station to Radio Free Asia.

== Technical details ==
Superrock KYOI was located at Agingan point of Saipan island. Both studio and transmitter facilities were co-sited in the same building, a 2,000-square-foot (190 m^{2}) concrete structure designed to withstand hurricane winds of 150 miles per hour and earthquakes of magnitude 3 on the Richter scale. The entire plant was self-sufficient, with its own 450-kilowatt diesel generator and a 2,500-gallon water catchment system with filtering unit and compression tank. The station had a powerful transmitter, a Continental Electronics 418-D-2, 100-kilowatt high level plate modulated, with an automatic servo system, allowing pre-tuning of channels in use. Three tubes sat in tanks of distilled water that boiled off into steam and then condensed back into water to be returned to the system.

The antenna system consisted of a complex and elaborate array, composed of 16 dipoles phased together directed towards an azimuth of 340 degrees true. The program of broadcasting consisted of continuous top 40 rock music controlled primarily by a computer audio sequencing system, with automated song title and station identification announcements inserted as required. The same computer system was also used to change frequency 4 times daily, completely eliminating operator error. The music was run from a program automation system, which held up to seven days of twenty-four-hour programming. A time clock was incorporated allowing station IDs and frequency change announcements to be aired at predetermined times. Music, commercials and jingles were all called up from a series of carts also by the computer system.

From its two 170-foot (52 m) towers, the latest in rock music was beamed to a primarily young Japanese audience of 18- to 30-year-olds from one end of Japan to the other. Among major advertisers supporting the station and its programs were Seiko, Sony, and Air Micronesia.

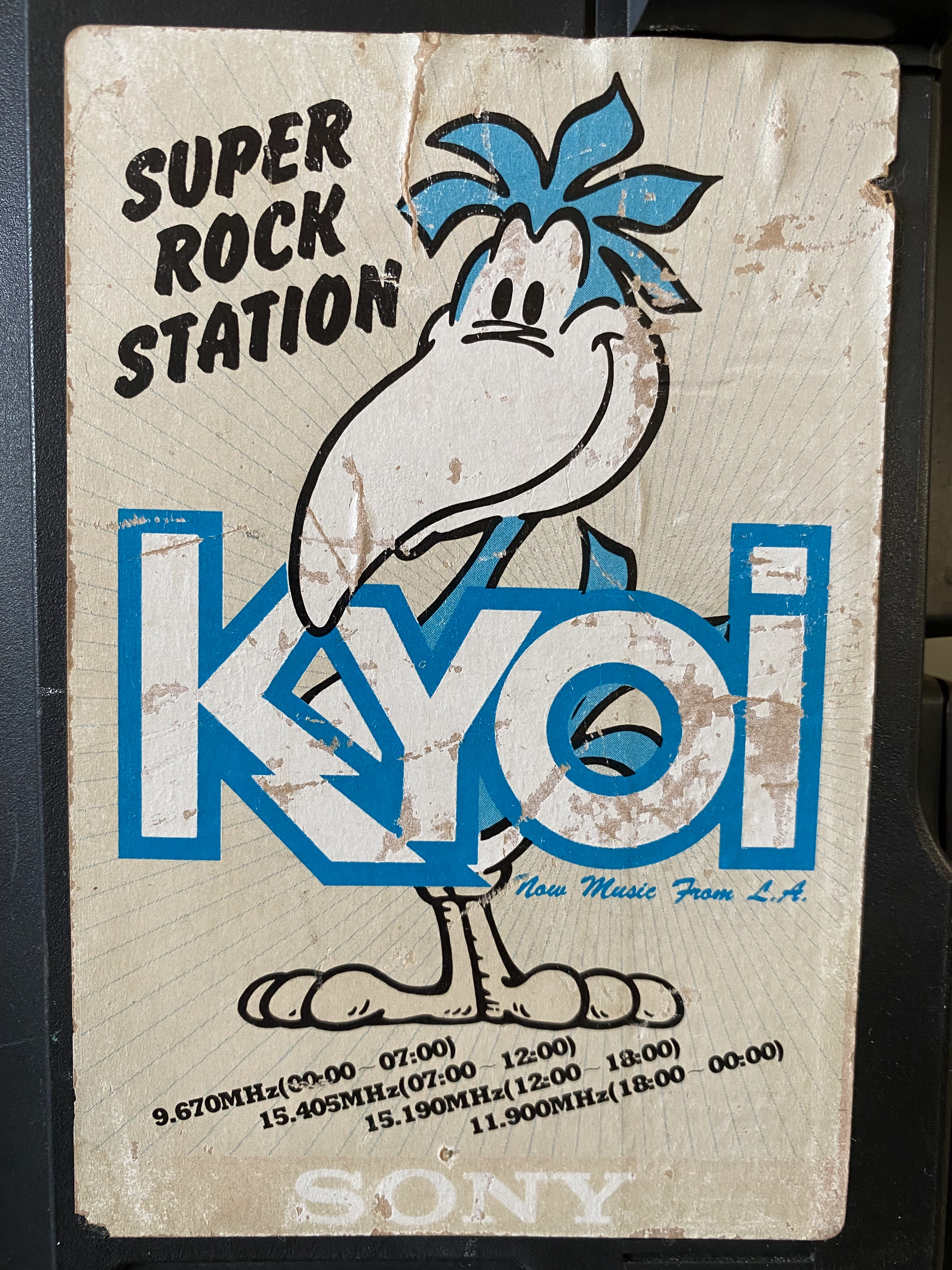
KYOI sticker

== Staff ==
The main creator of station was Lawrence Berger; other owners were Fred Zeder, and Adrian Perry. The main operator of the KYOI station was the Marcom company. Technical facilities on Saipan employed just six staff, working as operators, antenna riggers and other devices which were needed to keep the station on the air around the clock. On-air announcements and station IDs were done in both English and Japanese and time checks were always given in Japan Standard Time.

All programs of Superrock KYOI were prepared in Los Angeles, California by the Drake-Chenault Company, and then air-freighted to Saipan. All programming was prerecorded or voice-tracked; the station employed no live announcers although song title and artist information were given in prerecorded announcements. KYOI retained a representative in Japan to advise the programmer of the latest in Japanese pop music trends. However, the music format consisted chiefly of Western pop and rock, with very few J-pop singles played; the playlist included a flavoring of oldies dating back to the 1960s in addition to current and recent hit records. On-air features included a weekly Top 30 countdown (presented in both English and Japanese), "Music World" music news briefs, and a modern rock music feature prepared by KROQ-FM in Los Angeles. Sales of airtime were made in Japan, and bills paid from Honolulu with most business being conducted by telephone and telex.

KYOI received thousands of letters and reception reports, and acknowledged all reports with cards postmarked "Saipan CM". The station also hoped to encourage interest in Saipan as a vacation spot.
