= WRNO (shortwave) =

Coordinates: 29°50′12″N 90°6′57″W

- New Orleans, Louisiana; United States
- Frequency: (7505, 15420) kHz

Ownership
- Owner: Joseph Costello III

History
- First air date: February 18, 1982
- Call sign meaning: We're Radio New Orleans

Links
- Website: WRNO

WRNO (also known as WRNO Worldwide) is a commercial shortwave radio station which began international broadcasting on February 18, 1982 and continued regular broadcasting through the early 1990s from Metairie, Louisiana, with a continuation of periodic broadcasts starting in 2009. These call letters are still in use by the New Orleans station WRNO-FM; both were founded and originally owned by Joseph Costello III.

== The 1980s and 1990s ==
At the time of its approval by the FCC, WRNO Worldwide was the first privately owned shortwave station that had been licensed in several years. Before Costello's efforts, there were only three non-governmental American shortwave broadcasters on the air; by the end of the decade, that number had increased to sixteen. During the 1980s, WRNO shortwave had a rock music format, branded as the "World Rock of New Orleans" and operating from noon to midnight (GMT-6) daily. Originally a separate broadcast from the FM station, eventually WRNO turned to simulcasting WRNO-FM, which also had a rock music format. During the early 1990s WRNO turned to leasing airtime to religious and political commentators (for a time, it was the shortwave home of Rush Limbaugh's program) until a damaged transmitter forced the station off the air for several years.

== The 2000s and beyond ==
The station was bought in 2001 by Good News World Outreach, a non-profit religious broadcaster, and Robert Mawire, with the stated goal of broadcasting to areas where access to Christian materials are limited or restricted, but progress was slowed significantly when the antenna was destroyed by Hurricane Katrina. In August 2008, several DXers noted WRNO testing with Christian music on 7.505 MHz. As of February 2009, the station was still testing on 7.505 MHz with a stated schedule of 0100-0400 UTC. The new WRNO Worldwide is also approved for 7.355 and 15.59 MHz, but has not yet used those frequencies on a regular basis.

As of June 2009, WRNO apparently resumed broadcasting normally and was still appearing in some SWL logs at the beginning of 2010, but by the end of the year the station reported that the transmitter was once again offline for major repairs. As a result, the station was off the air for the entirety of 2011 apart from occasional transmitter tests. In a December 2011 Facebook post they anticipated returning to a full transmission schedule "sometime in January [2012]". WRNO was heard on air as November 14, 2013 at 7.505 MHz, and currently runs three hours of programming (from 0200 UTC to 0500 UTC on a frequency reported as the unusual number of "7506.4 kHz", while claiming to use 7505 kHz in on-air IDs.
