= International broadcasting =

Radio and television transmissions across borders

International broadcasting consists of radio and television transmissions that purposefully cross international boundaries, often with then intent of allowing expatriates to remain in touch with their countries of origin as well as educate, inform, and influence residents of foreign countries. Content can range from overt propaganda and counterpropaganda to cultural content to news reports that reflect the point of view and concerns of the originating country or that seek to provide alternative information to that otherwise available as well as promote tourism and trade. In the first half of the twentieth century, international broadcasting was used by colonial empires as a means of connecting colonies with the metropole (for example the BBC Empire Service as well as France's Poste Colonial and the Dutch overseas radio services, PCJJ and PHOHI). When operated by governments or entities close to a government, international broadcasting can be a form of soft power. Less frequently, international broadcasting has been undertaken for commercial purposes by private broadcasters.

International broadcasting, in a limited extent, began during World War I, when German and British stations broadcast press communiqués using Morse code. With the severing of Germany's undersea cables, the wireless telegraph station in Nauen was the country's sole means of long-distance communication. The US Navy Radio Service radio station in New Brunswick, Canada, transmitted the 'Fourteen Points' by wireless to Nauen in 1917. In turn, Nauen station broadcast the news of the abdication of Kaiser Wilhelm II on November 10, 1918. In the early 2020's, many of the public international broadcasters that court audiences abroad have seen their budgets shrink, with the exception of Deutsche Welle, while state media outlets from authoritarian countries like Russia, China and Iran have been increasing their budgets since the early 2000's.

== History ==
=== Origins ===
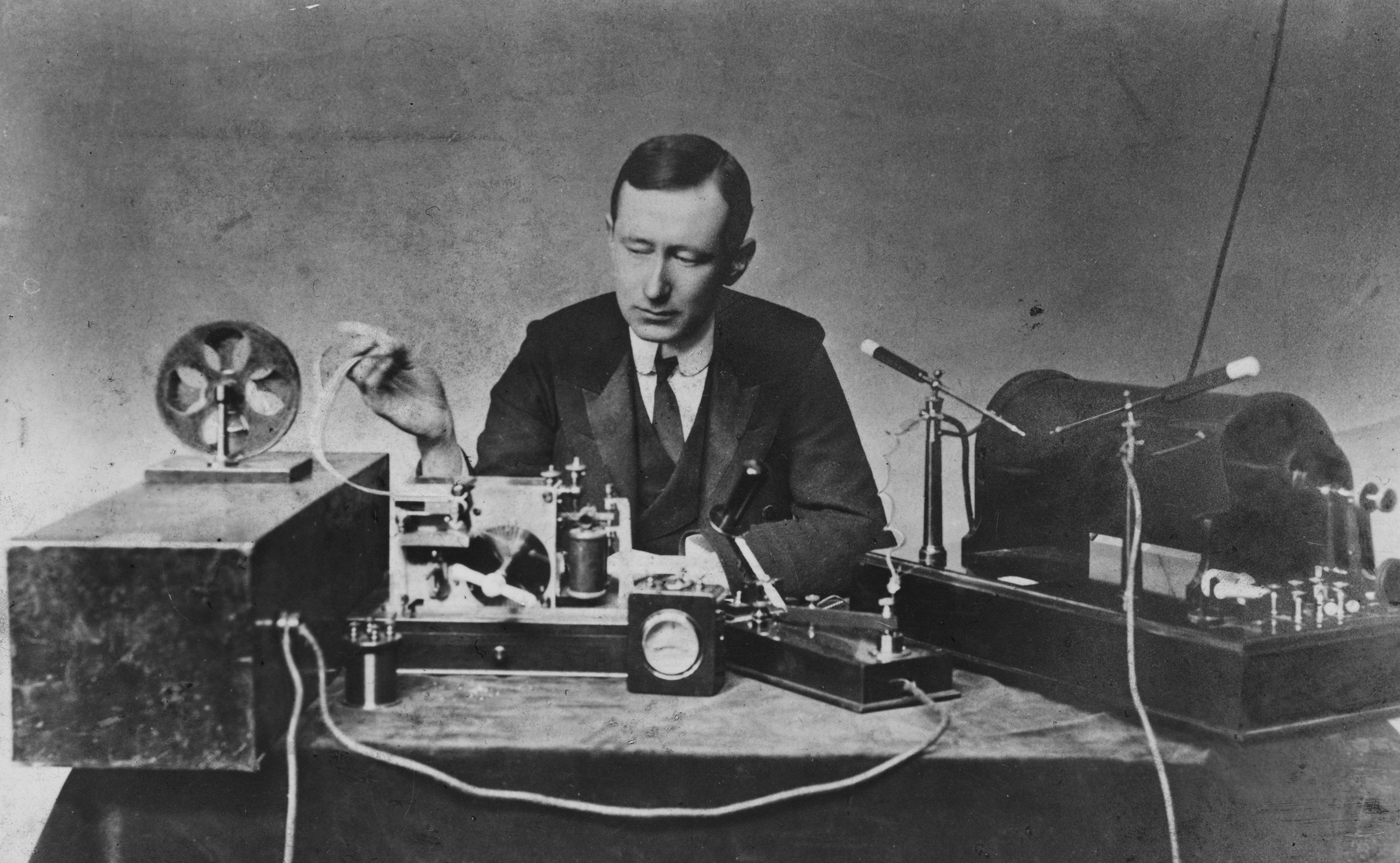
Guglielmo Marconi carried out the first short wave transmissions over a long distance.

Guglielmo Marconi pioneered the use of short wave radio for long-distance transmissions in the early 1920s. Using a system of parabolic reflector antennae, Marconi's assistant, Charles Samuel Franklin, rigged up a large antenna at Poldhu Wireless Station, Cornwall, running on 25 kW of power. In June and July 1923, wireless transmissions were completed during nights on 97 meters from Poldhu to Marconi's yacht Elettra in the Cape Verde Islands. High speed shortwave telegraphy circuits were then installed from London to Australia, India, South Africa and Canada as the main element of the Imperial Wireless Chain from 1926.

The Dutch began conducting experiments in the shortwave frequencies in 1925 from Eindhoven. The radio station PCJJ began its first international broadcasting on March 11, 1927, with programmes in Dutch for colonies in the Dutch West Indies and Dutch East Indies and in German, Spanish and English for the rest of the world. The popular Happy Station show was inaugurated in 1928 and became the world's longest-running shortwave programme, continuing until 1995, transferring to Radio Netherlands after World War II.

In 1927, Marconi also turned his attention toward long distance broadcasting on shortwave. His first such broadcasts took place to commemorate Armistice Day in the same year. He continued running a regular international broadcast that was picked up around the world, with programming from the 2LO station, then run by the BBC. The success of this operation caught the BBC's attention who rented out a shortwave transmitting station in Chelmsford, with the callsign G5SW, to Marconi. The BBC Empire Service was finally inaugurated on December 19, 1932, with transmissions aimed towards Australia and New Zealand.

=== Expansion ===
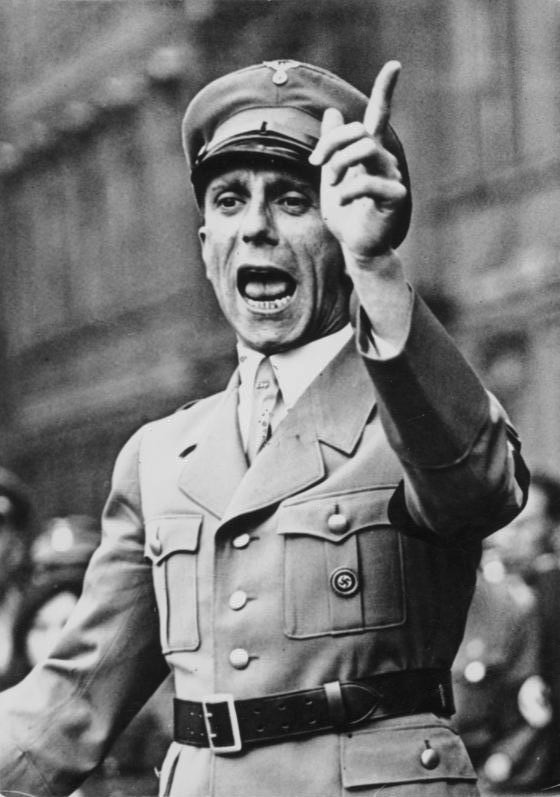
Joseph Goebbels headed Ministry of Public Enlightenment and Propaganda in Nazi Germany. International broadcasting was an important element in Nazi propaganda.

Other notable early international broadcasters included Vatican Radio (February 12, 1931), Radio Moscow, the official service of the Soviet Union (renamed the Voice of Russia, following the collapse of the Soviet Union). Clarence W. Jones started transmitting on Christmas Day, 1931 from Christian missionary radio station HCJB in Quito, Ecuador. Broadcasting in South Asia was launched in 1925 in Ceylon – Radio Ceylon, now the Sri Lanka Broadcasting Corporation is the oldest in the region.

Shortwave broadcasting from Nauen in Germany to the US, Central and South America, and the Far East began in 1926. A second station, Zeesen, was added in 1931. In January 1932, the German Reichspost assumed control of the Nauen station and added to its shortwave and longwave capacity. Once Adolf Hitler assumed power in 1933, shortwave, under the Auslandsrundfunk (Foreign Radio Section), was regarded as a vital element of Nazi propaganda.

German shortwave hours were increased from two hours a day to 18 per day, and eventually twelve languages were broadcast on a 24-hour basis, including English. A 100 kilowatt transmitter and antenna complex was built at Zeesen, near Berlin. Specialty target programming to the United States began in 1933, to South Africa, South America, and East Asia in 1934, and South Asia and Central America in 1938. German propaganda was organized under Joseph Goebbels, and played a key role in the German annexation of Austria and the Munich Crisis of 1938.

In 1936, the International Radio Union recognized Vatican Radio as a "special case" and authorized its broadcasting without any geographical limits. On December 25, 1937, a Telefunken 25-kW transmitter and two directional antennas were added. Vatican Radio broadcast over 10 frequencies.

During the Spanish Civil War, the Nationalist forces received a powerful Telefunken transmitter as a gift of Nazi Germany to aid their propaganda efforts, and until 1943 Radio Nacional de España collaborated with the Axis powers to retransmit in Spanish news from the official radio stations of Germany and Italy.

=== World War II ===
During the Second World War, Russian, German, British, and Italian international broadcasting services expanded. In 1938 the British BBC launched international services in German, French and Italian. In 1942, the United States initiated its international broadcasting service, the Voice of America. In the Pacific theater, General Douglas MacArthur used shortwave radio to keep in touch with the citizens of the Japanese-occupied Philippine Islands.

Several announcers who became well known in their countries included British Union of Fascists member William Joyce, who was one of the two "Lord Haw-Haw"s; Frenchmen Paul Ferdonnet and André Olbrecht, called "the traitors of [Radio] Stuttgart"; and Americans Frederick William Kaltenbach, "Lord Hee-Haw", and Mildred Gillars, one of the two announcers called "Axis Sally". Listeners to German programs often tuned in for curiosity's sake—at one time, German radio had half a million listeners in the U.S.--but most of them soon lost interest. Japan had "Tokyo Rose", who broadcast Japanese propaganda in English, along with American music to help ensure listeners.

During World War II, Vatican Radio's news broadcasts were banned in Germany. During the war, the radio service operated in four languages.

The British launched Radio SEAC from Colombo, Ceylon (Sri Lanka) during World War II. The station broadcast radio programs to the allied armed forces across the region from their headquarters in Ceylon.

Following the war and German partition, each Germany developed its own international broadcasting station: Deutsche Welle, using studios in Cologne, West Germany, and Radio Berlin International (RBI) in East Germany. RBI's broadcasts ceased shortly before the reunification of Germany on October 3, 1990, and Deutsche Welle took over its transmitters and frequencies.

=== Cold War era ===
The Cold War led to increased international broadcasting (and jamming), as Communist and non-Communist states attempted to influence each other's domestic population. Some of the most prominent Western broadcasters were the Voice of America, the BBC World Service, and the Radio Free Europe/Radio Liberty. The Soviet Union's most prominent service was Radio Moscow and China used Radio Peking (then Radio Beijing, now China Radio International). In addition to the U.S.-Soviet cold war, the Chinese-Russian border dispute led to an increase of the numbers of transmitters aimed at the two nations, and the development of new techniques such as playing tapes backwards for reel-to-reel recorders.

West Germany resumed regular shortwave broadcasts using Deutsche Welle on May 3, 1953. Its Julich transmitter site began operation in 1956, with eleven 100-kW Telefunken transmitters. The Wertachtal site was authorized in 1972 and began with four 500-kW transmitters. By 1989, there were 15 transmitters, four of which relayed the Voice of America. Meanwhile, in East Germany, the Nauen site began transmitting Radio DDR, later Radio Berlin International, on October 15, 1959.

In addition to these states, international broadcast services grew in Europe and the Middle East. Under the presidency of Gamal Nasser, Egyptian transmitters covered the Arab world; Israel's service, Kol Yisrael, served both to present the Israeli point of view to the world and to serve the Jewish diaspora, particularly behind the Iron Curtain.

Radio RSA, as part of the South African Broadcasting Corporation, was established in 1966 to promote the image of South Africa internationally and reduce criticism of apartheid. It continued in 1992, when the post-apartheid government renamed it Channel Africa.

Ironically, the isolationist Albania under Enver Hoxha, virtually a hermit kingdom, became one of the most prolific international broadcasters during the latter decades of the Cold War, with Radio Tirana one of the top five broadcasters in terms of hours of programming produced.

Estimated total programme hours per week of some external broadcasters

Country	Political Alignment	Broadcaster(s)	1950	1955	1960	1965	1970	1975	1980	1985	1990
Albania	NAM	Radio Tirana	26	47	63	154	487	490	560	581	451
Australia	West	Radio Australia	181	226	257	299	350	379	333	352	330
Bulgaria	East	Radio Sofia	30	60	117	154	164	197	236	290	320
Canada	West	Radio Canada International (RCI)	85	83	80	81	98	159	134	169	195
China	-	Radio Beijing	66	159	687	1027	1267	1423	1350	1446	1515
Cuba	East	Radio Havana Cuba (RHC)	-	-	-	325	320	311	424	379	352
Czechoslovakia	East	Radio Prague	119	147	196	189	202	253	255	268	131
Egypt	NAM	Radio Cairo	-	100	301	505	540	635	546	560	605
France	West	Radio France Internationale (RFI)	198	191	326	183	200	108	125	272	379
West Germany	West	Deutsche Welle (DW), Deutschlandfunk (DLF)	-	105	315	671	779	767	804	795	848
East Germany	East	Radio Berlin International (RBI)	-	9	185	308	274	342	375	413	-
Hungary	East	Radio Budapest	76	99	120	121	105	127	127	122	102
India	NAM	All India Radio (AIR)	116	117	157	175	271	326	389	408	456
Iran	NAM	Voice of the Islamic Republic of Iran	12	10	24	118	155	154	175	310	400
Israel	-	Kol Yisrael	-	28	91	92	158	198	210	223	253
Italy	West	Radiotelevisione Italiana (RAI)	170	185	205	160	165	170	169	173	181
Japan	-	Radio Japan	-	91	203	249	259	259	259	287	343
North Korea	NAM	Radio Pyongyang	-	53	159	392	330	455	597	535	534
Netherlands	West	Radio Nederland Wereldomroep (RNW)	127	120	178	235	335	400	289	336	323
Nigeria	NAM	Voice of Nigeria	-	-	-	63	62	61	170	322	120
Poland	East	Radio Polonia	131	359	232	280	334	340	337	320	292
Portugal	West	RDP Internacional	46	102	133	273	295	190	214	140	203
Romania	East	Radio Bucharest	30	109	159	163	185	190	198	212	199
(Union of South Africa) South Africa	West	Radio RSA	-	127	63	84	150	141	183	205	156
Soviet Union	East	Radio Moscow, Peace & Progress, Republics	533	656	1015	1417	1908	2001	2094	2211	1876
Spain	West	Radio Exterior de España (REE)	68	98	202	276	251	312	239	252	403
Sweden	-	Radio Sweden	28	128	114	142	140	154	155	196	167
Turkey	West	Voice of Turkey	40	100	77	91	88	172	199	307	322
United Kingdom	West	BBC	643	558	589	667	723	719	719	729	796
United States	West	VoA, RFE/RL	497	1690	1495	1832	1907	2029	1901	2339	2611
Yugoslavia	NAM	Radio Yugoslavia	80	46	70	78	76	82	72	86	96

=== Today ===
At the end of the Cold War, many international broadcasters cut back on hours and foreign languages broadcast, or reemphasized other language services. For example, in 1984, Radio Canada International broadcast in English, French, German, Spanish, Czech/Slovak, Hungarian, Polish, Russian, and Ukrainian. In 2005, RCI broadcast in English, Chinese, Arabic, Russian, and Spanish. There is a bigger trend towards TV (e.g. BBC World News, NHK World, CCTV-9) and news websites.

Some services, such as Swiss Radio International, left shortwave altogether and exist in Internet form, Swissinfo. Radio Canada International ceased shortwave broadcasting in 2012 becoming a purely online service producing podcasts and maintaining a website in several languages. Radio Netherlands ceased broadcasting in 2012 and was transformed into RNW Media, an NGO that trains youth in developing countries to use digital media for social change. Radio Moscow's successor, Voice of Russia, was disbanded in 2014 and replaced by Sputnik, a multimedia news platform, which does not broadcast on shortwave. Other shortwave broadcasters have ceased operations entirely since the 1990s.

In addition, new standards, such as Digital Radio Mondiale, are being introduced, as well as sending programs over the Web to be played back later, as "podcasts".

International broadcasting using the traditional audio-only method will not cease any time soon due to its cost efficiencies. However, international broadcasting via television is considered more strategically important at least since the early 2000s.

The BBC World Service was the first broadcaster to consider setting up a satellite television news and information channel as far back as 1976, but ceded being the first to CNN (that had primary access to Canada soon after launch). The defunct BBC World Service Antigua Relay Station was built in 1976, but its setup costs were not known to have been part of the BBCWS decision processes at the time.

In the early 1990s, many international (as well as domestic) 24-hour news and information channels launched as part of the post-Cold War prosperity bubble. There was another burst of global news channels launching in the late 2000s as part the developing world trying to catch up with the developed world in this area.

In the early 2020's, many of the public international broadcasters that court audiences abroad have seen their budgets shrink, with the exception of Deutsche Welle, while state media outlets from authoritarian countries like Russia, China and Iran have been increasing their budgets since the early 2000's. Authoritarian states have also sought to expand their reach by buying advertising on social media, like Facebook, and covertly co-opting influencers.

== Reasons for international broadcasting ==
Broadcasters in one country have several reasons to reach out to an audience in other countries. Commercial broadcasters may simply see a business opportunity to sell advertising or subscriptions to a broader audience. This is more efficient than broadcasting to a single country, because domestic entertainment programs and information gathered by domestic news staff can be cheaply repackaged for non-domestic audiences.

Governments typically have different motivations for funding international broadcasting. One clear reason is for ideological, or propaganda reasons. Many government-owned stations portray their nation in a positive, non-threatening way. This could be to encourage business investment in or tourism to the nation. Another reason is to combat a negative image produced by other nations or internal dissidents, or insurgents. Radio RSA, the broadcasting arm of the apartheid South African government, is an example of this. A third reason is to promote the ideology of the broadcaster. For example, a program on Radio Moscow from the 1960s to the 1980s was What is Communism?

A second reason is to advance a nation's foreign policy interests and agenda by disseminating its views on international affairs or on the events in particular parts of the world. During the Cold War the American Radio Free Europe and Radio Liberty and Indian Radio AIR were founded to broadcast news from "behind the Iron Curtain" that was otherwise being censored and promote dissent and occasionally, to disseminate disinformation. Currently, the US operates similar services aimed at Cuba (Radio y Televisión Martí) and the People's Republic of China, Vietnam, Laos and North Korea (Radio Free Asia).

The BBC World Service, the Voice of America, All India Radio and other western broadcasters have emphasized news broadcasts, particularly to countries that are experiencing repression or civil unrest and whose populations are unable to obtain news from non-government sources. In the case of emergencies, a nation may broadcast special programs overseas to inform listeners what is occurring. During Iraqi missile strikes on Israel during the 1991 Gulf War, Kol Israel relayed its domestic service on its shortwave service.

Besides ideological reasons, many stations are run by religious broadcasters and are used to provide religious education, religious music, or worship service programs. For example, Vatican Radio, established in 1931, broadcasts such programs. Another station, such as HCJB or Trans World Radio will carry brokered programming from evangelists. In the case of the Broadcasting Services of the Kingdom of Saudi Arabia, both governmental and religious programming is provided.

Stations also broadcast to international audiences for cultural reasons. Often a station has an official mandate to keep expatriates in touch with their home country. Many broadcasters often relay their national domestic service on shortwave for that reason. Other reasons include teaching a foreign language, such as Radio Exterior de España's Spanish class, Un idioma sin fronteras, or the Voice of America's broadcasts in Special English. In the case of major broadcasters such as the BBC World Service or Radio Australia, there is also an educational outreach.

An additional reason for international broadcasting is to maintain contact with a country's citizens travelling abroad or expatriates who have emigrated and share news from home as well as cultural programming. This role of external shortwave broadcasting has declined as advances in communications have allowed expatriates to read news from home and listen and watch to domestic broadcasts in their own language via the internet and satellite. A number of international services such as the original BBC Empire Service, Radio Netherlands, France's Poste Colonial (now Radio France International) and others were founded in part with the goal of helping draw overseas empires closer to the mother country and provide closer cultural and communication connections between the home country and its colonies, a role that became largely obsolete due to decolonization.

=== Notable networks ===
- CNN International (English)
- BBC News (Arabic, English, Persian)
- BBC World Service (Arabic, Azeri, Bengali, Burmese, Cantonese, English, French for Africa, Hausa, Hindi, Indonesian, Kinyarwanda, Kirundi, Kyrgyz, Nepali, Pashto, Persian, Portuguese for Brazil, Russian, Sinhala, Somali, Spanish for Latin America, Swahili, Tamil, Turkish, Ukrainian, Urdu, Uzbek, Vietnamese)
- DD News (Hindi, English, Sanskrit, Punjabi, Tamil, Telugu, Kannada, Malawi, Urdu, Bangla, Marathi, Malayalam, Thai, Baloch, Arabic, Fiji Hindi, Bhojpuri, Assami, Nagapure)
- Asian News International (Hindi, English, Tamil, Telugu, Bangla)
- Sky News (English, Arabic)
- France 24 (French, English, Arabic, Spanish)
- Al Jazeera (English, Arabic)
- Telesur (Spanish, English)
- Deutsche Welle (German, English, Spanish, Hindi, Tamil, Russian, Arabic, Persian, Dari, Pashto, Urdu, Albanian, Amharic, Bengali, Bosnian, Bulgarian, Mandarin Chinese, French, Greek, Hausa, Indonesian, Kiswahili, Turkish, Macedonian, Portuguese, Romanian, Serbian, Ukrainian)
- EBC (Portuguese, English, Spanish)
- TRT World (English, Arabic, Turkish)
- Voice of Turkey (English, Arabic, Armenian, Azerbaijani, Bulgarian, Chinese, Dari, French, Georgian, German, Hausa, Italian, Japanese, Kazakh, Malay, Pashto, Kurdish, Russian, Spanish, Swahili, Turkmen, Turkish, Urdu, Uyghur, Uzbek)
- Press Trust of India (Hindi and 98 other languages)
- Press TV (English, French)
- TV5Monde (French)
- CNA (English)
- ANC (English, Filipino)
- Zee News (Hindi)
- RT (Russian, English, French, German, Arabic, Spanish)
- Zee Entertainment (Hindi, Thai, English, Tamil, Telghu, and 126 other local languages)
- Voice of Indonesia (English, French, Spanish, German, Indonesian, Japanese, Arabic, Chinese, Dutch)
- ABC Australia (English)
- RNZ International (English, French, Samoan, Tongan, Niuean, Cook Islands Maori, Solomon Islands Pidgin)
- i24NEWS (English, French, Spanish, Arabic)
- Sun TV (Tamil)
- NHK World-Japan (English, Japanese)
- CGTN (English, French, Spanish, Russian, Arabic)
- China Radio International (Albanian, Arabic, Armenian, Belarusian, Bengali, Bulgarian, Burmese, Croatian, Cambodian, Czech, Dutch, English, Esperanto, Estonian, Filipino, French, German, Greek, Hausa, Hebrew, Hindi, Hungarian, Indonesian, Italian, Japanese, Laotian, Malaysian, Nepali, Persian, Polish, Portuguese, Pashto, Romanian, Russian, Serbian, Sinhala, Spanish, Swahili, Swedish, Tamil, Turkish, Ukrainian, Urdu, Vietnamese, Hakka, Cantonese, Hokkien, Teochew, Hakka, Wenzhouese, Uyghur, Kazakh, Mongolian, Korean)
- Arirang (English, Korean, Chinese, Spanish, Arabic, Russian, Vietnamese, Indonesian)
- WION (English)
- RAE (Spanish, German, French, English, Italian, Portuguese, Chinese, Japanese)

== Means to reach an audience ==
Because of this many broadcasters are discovering they can reach a wider audience through other methods (particularly the internet and satellite television) and are cutting back on (or even entirely dropping) shortwave.

An international broadcaster has several options for reaching a foreign audience:

- If the foreign audience is near the broadcaster, high-power longwave and mediumwave stations can provide reliable coverage.
- If the foreign audience is more than 1,000 kilometers away from the broadcaster, shortwave radio is reliable, but subject to interruption by adverse solar/geomagnetic conditions.
- An international broadcaster may use a local mediumwave or FM radio or television relay station in the target country or countries.
- An international broadcaster may use a local shortwave broadcaster as a relay station.
- Neighboring states, such as Israel and Jordan, may broadcast television programs to each other's viewing public.

An international broadcaster such as the BBC, Radio France International or Germany's Deutsche Welle, may use all the above methods. Several international broadcasters, such as Swiss Radio International, have abandoned shortwave broadcasting altogether, relying on Internet transmissions only. Others, such as the BBC World Service, have abandoned shortwave transmissions to North America, relying on local relays, the Internet, and satellite transmissions.

=== Mediumwave and longwave broadcasts ===
Most radio receivers in the world receive the mediumwave band (530 kHz to 1710 kHz), which at night is capable of reliable reception from 150 to 2,500 km distance from a transmitter. Mediumwave is used heavily all over the world for international broadcasting on a formal and informal basis.

In addition, many receivers used in Europe and Russia can receive the longwave broadcast band (150 to 280 kHz), which provides reliable long-distance communications over continental distances.

=== Shortwave broadcast ===
Shortwave receivers are capable of receiving shortwave transmissions (2,000 to 30,000 kHz or 2 to 30 MHz). Depending on time of day, season of year, solar weather and Earth's geomagnetic field, a signal might reach around the world.

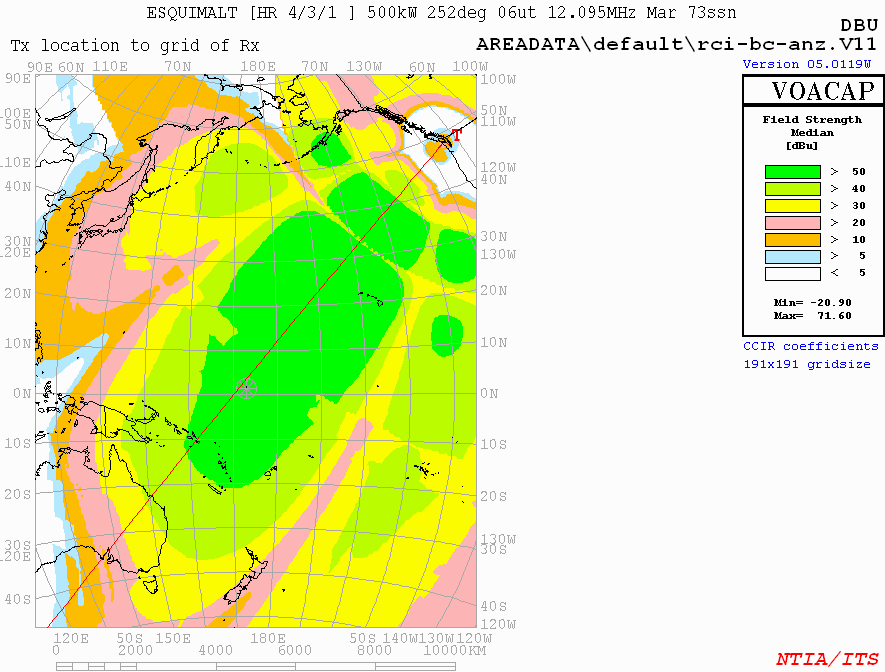
This sort of map is used by radio engineers to determine the best frequencies to reach international audiences on shortwave bands. In this case, a transmitter is sited in the Southern Vancouver Island, using a frequency of 12095 kHz and transmitting at the 500 kW power level. The picture shows a good signal over the Southern Pacific. The signal fades out as it approaches the East Coast of Australia.

In previous decades shortwave (and sometimes high-powered mediumwave) transmission was regarded as the main (and often the only) way in which broadcasters could reach an international audience. In recent years the proliferation of technologies such as satellite broadcasting, the Internet, and rebroadcasts of programming on AM and FM within target nations has meant that this is no longer necessarily the case.

Transmitter output power has increased since 1920. Higher transmitter powers do guarantee better reception in the target area. Higher transmitter power in most cases counteracts the lesser effects of jamming.

- 1950s : 100 kW
- 1960s : 200 kW, early 1960s (2 × 100 kW 'twinned')
- 1970s : 300 kW, but many 250 kW transmitters sold
- 1980s : 500 kW sometimes transmitters were "doubled up" to produce 1000 kW output
- 1980s-present: 600 kW single, 1200 kW from twinned transmitters.

International stations generally use special directional antennas to aim the signal toward the intended audience and increase the effective power in that direction. Use of such antennas for international broadcasting began in the mid-1930s and became prominent by the 1950s. By using antennas which focus most of their energy in one direction, a modern station may achieve the equivalent, in that direction, of tens of millions of watts of radio power.

=== Digital audio broadcasting ===
Some international broadcasters have become available via digital audio broadcasting (DAB) in Europe in the 1990s, and in a similar limited way in the Americas via in-band FM (IBOC) DAB systems in the US in the 2000s. This is a popular method to reach listeners in cars that would otherwise not be accessible during that part of the day. However, in terms of the global international broadcasting audience the DAB listener base is very small—one can assume that it is less than 2% of the listener base globally.

=== Television ===
International broadcasting via 24 hour TV news channels has its origins in North America in the early 1980s. CNN technically was the first 24-hour international news channel as it was made available in Canada soon after launch. The BBC World Service considered setting up a global TV news channel as far back as 1975, but abandoned the idea for internal reasons.

Notwithstanding a large number of international 24-hour television news and information broadcasters, the television percentage of viewers is still fairly small when compared to global radio listener numbers.

The rural populations of Sub-Saharan Africa and South Asia (as well as East Asia) have radio listener bases that are far larger than the largest international TV broadcaster could hope for, yet they could be considered underserved since the end of the Cold War (when these regions had more radio broadcasts targeted at them).

==== Streaming video sites ====
Many international television broadcasters (as well as domestic television broadcasters) have set up accounts on streaming video sites like YouTube to allow their news and information broadcasts to be globally distributed. The viewer numbers for these sites may seem huge. Cable, TVRO and terrestrial television broadcasters probably have 100 to 1,000 times larger audiences for their international broadcasting content.

International broadcasters known to maintain their own streaming video sites (not authoritative):

- ABC Australia
- ABS-CBN News Channel (ANC)
- Al Jazeera
- BBC World News
- CNN International
- DD News
- Deutsche Welle
- France 24
- i24NEWS
- RT
- Sky News
- WION

=== RSS feeds and email ===
Many international broadcasters (television or radio) can reach "unreachable" audiences via email and RSS feeds. This is not at all unusual, as the first commonly agreed international broadcast was a Morse Code telegram transmitted from US President Wilson to the German Kaiser (mid-1918) via a high powered longwave transmitter on the US East Coast (this important event in international broadcasting history was described in depth in the IEEE "The History of International Broadcasting" first volume). As Morse Code is considered to be a data format, with email and RSS merely being refinements of the technology it can be said that international broadcasting has a deep relationship with modern-day datacasting.

The reach of RSS and email for international broadcasters is not really known that well, especially considering that emails get forwarded. The numbers for active RSS and email audiences are probably 5 to 20 times larger than for streaming video. It may take into the 2010s to get meaningful numbers with respect to the size of these audiences for assorted technical reasons related to the RSS and email technologies.

Email and RSS feeds can traverse telecommunications barriers that streaming video cannot, thus the larger expected audience numbers. The global economic downturn of 2008-2009 will probably increase the email and RSS audience sizes as fewer people will be able to afford high speed internet connections in North America, Western Europe and the Asia-Pacific regions.

== Listeners ==
An international broadcaster may have the technical means of reaching a foreign audience, but unless the foreign audience has a reason to listen, the effectiveness of the broadcaster is in question.

One of the most common foreign audiences consists of expatriates, who cannot listen to radio or watch television programs from home. Another common audience is radio hobbyists, who attempt to listen to as many countries as possible and obtain verification cards or letters (QSLs). These audiences send letters and in response few radio stations write them back. These kind of Listeners often take part in weekly and monthly quizzes and contests started by many radio stations. A third audience consists of journalists, government officials, and key businesspersons, who exert a disproportionate influence on a state's foreign or economic policy.

A fourth, but less publicized audience, consists of intelligence officers and agents who monitor broadcasts for both open-source intelligence clues to the broadcasting state's policies and for hidden messages to foreign agents operating in the receiving country. The BBC started its monitoring service in Caversham, Reading in 1936 (now BBC Monitoring). In the United States, the DNI Open Source Center (formerly the Central Intelligence Agency's Foreign Broadcast Information Service) provides the same service. Copies of OSC/FBIS reports can be found in many U.S. libraries that serve as government depositories. In addition, a number of hobbyists listen and report "spook" transmissions.

Without these four audiences, international broadcasters face difficulty in getting funding. In 2001, for example, the BBC World Service stopped transmitting shortwave broadcasts to North America, and other international broadcasters, such as YLE Radio Finland, stopped certain foreign-language programs.

However, international broadcasting has been successful when a country does not provide programming wanted by a wide segment of the population. In the 1960s, when there was no BBC service playing rock and roll, Radio Television Luxembourg (RTL) broadcast rock and roll, including bands such as the Beatles, into the United Kingdom. Similar programming came from an unlicensed, or "pirate" station, Radio Caroline, which broadcast from a ship in the international waters of the North Sea.

== Restricting reception ==
In many cases, governments do not want their citizens listening to international broadcasters. In Nazi Germany, a major propaganda campaign, backed by law and prison sentences, attempted to discourage Germans from listening to such stations. The practice was made illegal in 1939. In addition, the German government sold a cheap, 76 ℛ︁ℳ︁ "People's Receiver", as well as an even cheaper 35 ℛ︁ℳ︁ receiver, that could not pick up distant signals well.

The idea was copied by Stalin's Soviet Union, which had a nearly identical copy manufactured in the Tesla factory in Czechoslovakia. In North Korea, all receivers are sold with fixed frequencies, tuned to local stations.

The most common method of preventing reception is jamming, or broadcasting a signal on the same frequencies as the international broadcaster. Germany jammed the BBC European service during the Second World War. Russian and Eastern European jammers were aimed against Radio Free Europe, other Western broadcasters, and against Chinese broadcasters during the nadir of Sino-Soviet relations. In 2002, the Cuban government jammed the Voice of America's Radio Martí program and the Chinese government jammed Radio Free Asia, Voice of America, Radio Taiwan International as well broadcasts made by adherents of Falun Gong.

North Korea restricts most people to a single fixed frequency mediumwave receiver; those who met political requirements and whose work absolutely required familiarity with events abroad were allowed shortwave receivers. Another method of reaching people with government radio programming, but not foreign programming, is the use of radio broadcasting by direct broadcasting to loudspeakers. David Jackson, director of the Voice of America, noted "The North Korean government doesn't jam us, but they try to keep people from listening through intimidation or worse. But people figure out ways to listen despite the odds. They're very resourceful."

Yet another method of preventing reception involves moving a domestic station to the frequency used by the international broadcaster. During the Batista government of Cuba, and during the Castro years, Cuban medium-wave stations broadcast on the frequencies of popular South Florida stations. In October 2002, Iraq changed frequencies of two stations to block the Voice of America's Radio Sawa program.

Jamming can be defeated by using very efficient transmitting antennas, carefully choosing the transmitted frequency, changing transmitted frequency often, using single sideband, and properly aiming the receiving antenna.

== See also ==
- List of international broadcasters
- List of shortwave radio broadcasters
- Shortwave
- Shortwave bands
- Shortwave listening
- FTA receiver
- Medium wave – MW broadcasts generally don't travel as far as shortwave broadcasts, but MW is still used for international broadcasting, particularly to neighboring countries
- MW DX (mediumwave DXing)
- State media
