= Wertachtal transmitter site =

Coordinates: 48.0869°N 10.695°E

The Wertachtal transmitter site (German: Kurzwellensendeanlage Wertachtal) in Bavaria, Germany, was from 1972 to 2013 the biggest shortwave broadcasting facility in Europe. It was located in the valley of the Wertach River near the village of Amberg (Swabia), and was originally operated by Deutsche Bundespost, and later by Media Broadcast GmbH. Before the site was closed, it included 14 500 kW radio transmitters and two 100 kW radio transmitters. It was built in 1969 and demolished in 2014.

== Location ==
The transmitters and more than 85% of the antennas were located on the territory of the village of Amberg, and the rest of the antennas in Langerringen, in the Wertach valley.

== Technical data ==
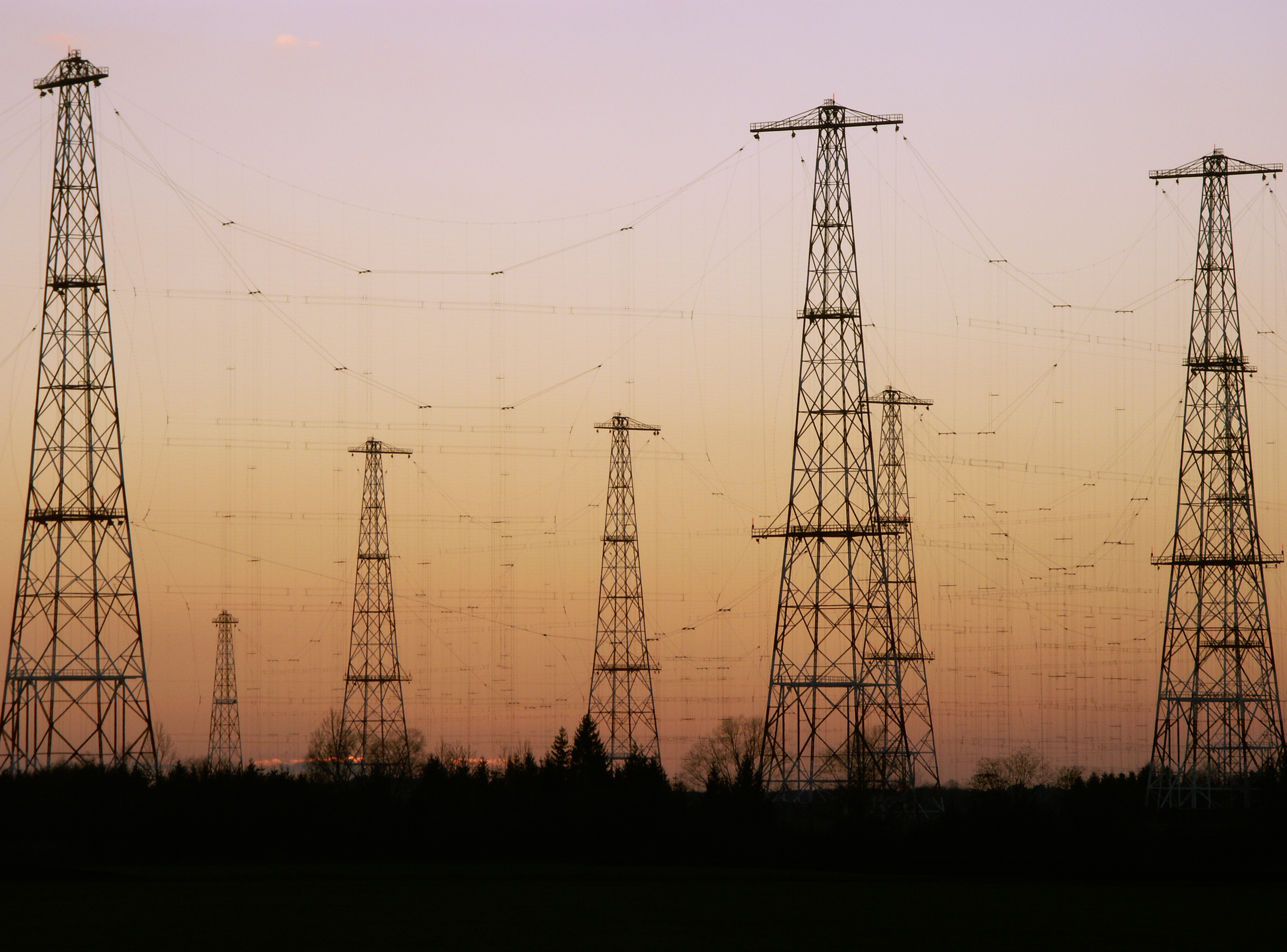
Transmitter towers in 2008

In 2008, there were 14 transmitters of 500 kW each and two transmitters of 100 kW. The antennas used by the transmitters were very large; the 68 antennas were supported by rows of towers, the largest of them 125 metres (410 ft) high and with foundations 12 metres (39 ft) deep. There were 34 towers in all, constructed from 4,200 tonnes (4,100 long tons; 4,600 short tons)of steel. At night, the towers were illuminated and could be seen from a distance of 20 kilometres (12 mi) The three rows of antennas were 1 kilometre (0.62 mi), 1.3 kilometres (0.81 mi) and 1.9 kilometres (1.2 mi) long. Two 110 kV electrical power lines supplied power. The site used about 20 MW of power.

== History ==
After German shortwave broadcaster Deutsche Welle was founded in 1953, the Jülich radio transmitter was built in 1956 to transit shortwave radio broadcasts. In preparation for the 1972 Summer Olympics at Munich, Deutsche Welle decided to build a new transmitter site because the nine 100 kW transmitters in Jülich were too small. Construction began in 1969 on a 200 hectares (490 acres) near Amberg. The transmitters were supplied by AEG-Telefunken and the antennas by Brown, Boveri & Cie. About 600 people worked to build the site. By September 1971, six out of 25 towers had been completed, with heights reading to 125 m. They held the first antennas, directed towards North America and the Near East. The same year, the first three 500 kW transmitters were installed by AEG-Telefunken. Five transmitters needed to be installed before the beginning of the Summer Olympics. Test transmissions began on 10 April 1970 using the 500 kW transmitters; they stopped at the beginning of the Olympics. One of the four transmitters was used to transmit the Olympic program ARD-Olympiawelle on 5995 kHz while the others were used for foreign-language broadcasts. After the Olympics finished, the site was used by Germany's national shortwave broadcaster Deutsche Welle. In the following years until 2012, additional 500 kW transmitters were installed, also supplied by AEG-Telefunken.

Starting in 1987, foreign broadcasters also used the Wertachtal site, including Voice of America, Radio Canada International and Radio Nederland Wereldomroep. Since Voice of America wanted a long-term lease on the transmitters, new antennas were installed replacing the old ones. On 31 December 1995, Voice of America stopped broadcasting from Wertachtal, and Deutsche Welle decided to move its transmissions from the site in Jülich to Wertachtal and Nauen (Brandebourg). For this, a new quadrant-antenna was installed for transmissions to Europe.

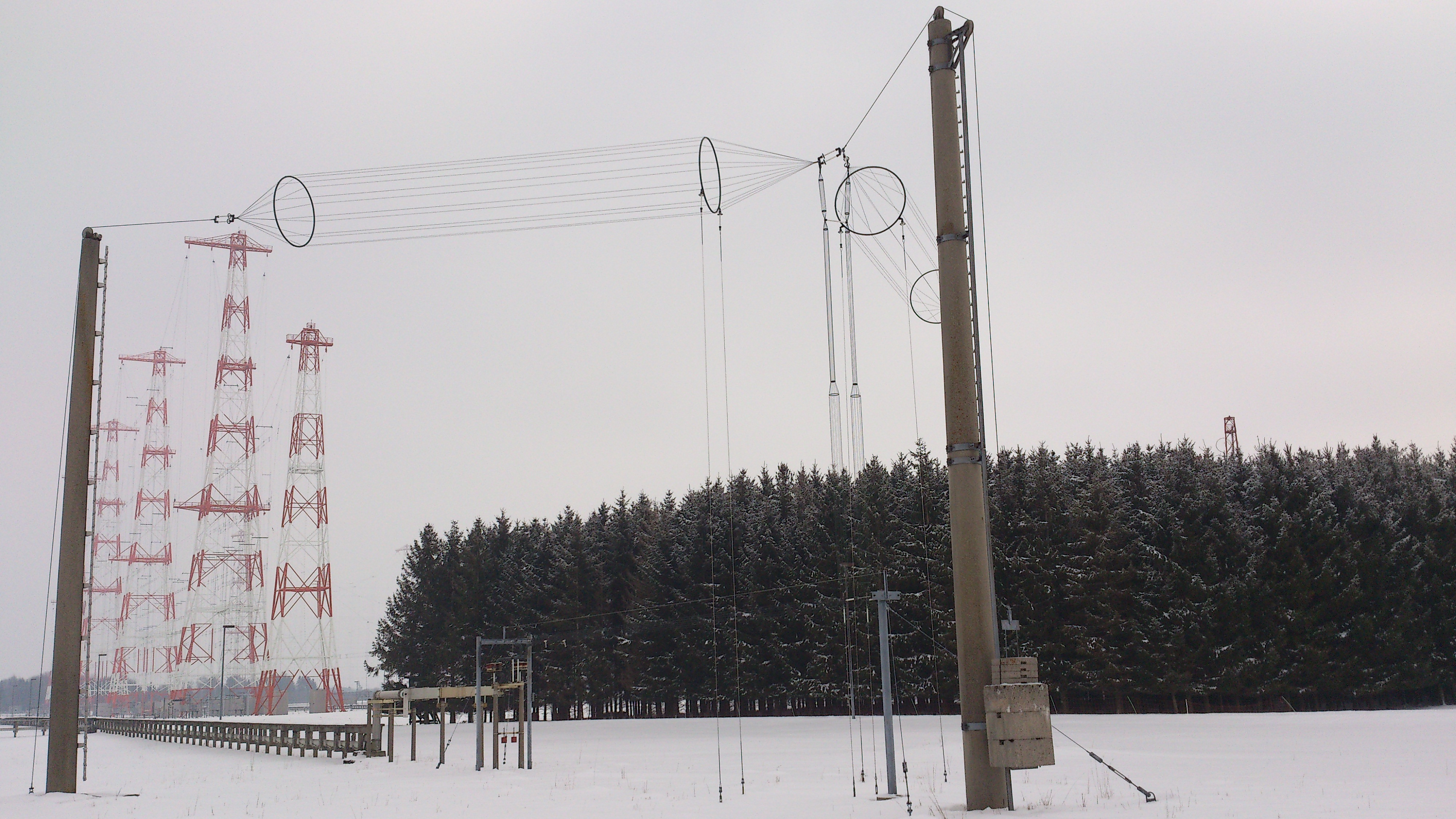
Quadrant-Antenna (omnidirectional for 6 and 7 MHz) to serve central Europe. In the background are the main towers of the Wertachtal shortwave transmitter site.

Other broadcasters using the site included Adventist World Radio from 1996, et Family Radio from 2001.

In 2003 a new design transmitter was installed that could operate at 500 kW in conventional (AM ) or 200 kW in Digital Radio Mondiale (DRM), a new broadcasting standard. This was a joint venture of T-Systems, Telefunken Sendertechnik (which became TRANSRADIO Sendersysteme Berlin, which no longer exists), and of RIZ Zagreb. At the end of 2006, Deutsche Welle discontinued its transmissions from Wertachtal, and moved them to a site at Woofferton in England. On 15 January 2008, the Wertachtal transmitter site was sold to Media Broadcast GmbH. In April 2013, all but four broadcasts (some religious stations were the exceptions) were transferred to the Nauen transmitter site, which was then at full capacity, with 60 broadcasts per day. On 1 May 2013, the remaining broadcasts were transferred to Nauen, but the Wertachtal centre remained in working order.

== Antenna assembly ==
The antenna assembly of Wertachtal transmitter site at final State

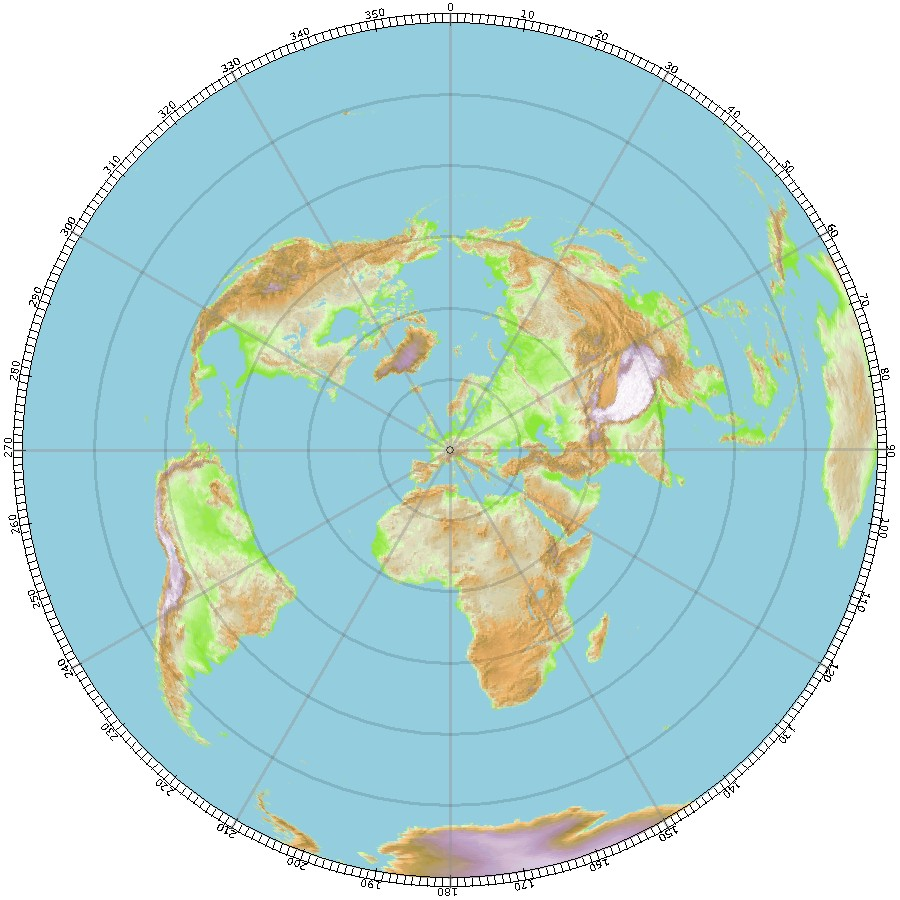
Great circle (equidistance) map central Europe with 2,500 kilometres (1,600 mi) ranges

The antennas are set as a three-pointed star. Bank-1 to the north, length of 1.3 kilometres (0.81 mi), bank-2 with 1.9 kilometres (1.2 mi) to the south-east and bank-3 with 1 kilometre (0.62 mi) to the south-west. The longest connection to one of the antennas was 1.9 kilometres (1.2 mi). Total lengths of all coaxial-cable connections was 53 kilometres (33 mi). During first expansion stage there were 52 antennas for long-distance transmission (24 of them for 3-band and 28 for 2-band use) so as 11 lines of dipoles as 2-band-antennas for short-distance transmission. In final state there were built up 67 antennas. All antennas were equipped with pivoting (or slewing) switches to tilt the main antenna-beam to +/- 5, 15 or 30 degrees. The antennas were furnished by German affiliate of Swiss BBC (today Ampegon) at Mannheim. To fulfill the necessity to connect any of the 16 transmitters to any of the 67 antennas, a cross-point switching matrix of 8 metres (26 ft) height with more than 1.000 elements was built up.
In addition to the curtain-antennas primarily existed five log-periodic antennas with horizontal polarization, consisting in two radiators with 26 dipoles each, built up side by side. The main beam could be tilt to +/- 20 degrees by pivoting (or slewing) switches. They were furnished by Telefunken. These antennas were used for destinations up to 2,000 kilometres (1,200 mi). As omnidirectional antennas for shorter distances (central Europe) six quadrant antennas were mounted, each usable for two proximate frequencies. In the middle of the 80s the antenna-set was changed due to the intention of Voice of America to intensify transmitting in direction of Eastern Europe (in political meaning) and to North Africa. All but one (No 224) of the log-periodic antennas were removed. At their place another four curtain-antennas with main beam to 60° and operating distance between 1,000 kilometres (620 mi) and 2,000 kilometres (1,200 mi) were built instead.

=== The antennas, their frequencies and directions at final state ===
==== Bank 1, Nord ====
Place	No	Frequencies (MHz)	Mode	Azimuth	Destination	Form
A	101	15/17/21	F	270°	Northern South America, The Caribbean	HRS 4/4
A	102	6/7	N	90°	Caucasus Area	HRS 4/1
B	103	6/7	F	270°	Northern South America, The Caribbean	HRS 4/4
B	104	7/9	F	90°	India, South Eastern Asia, Australia	HRS 4/5
B	104	7/9	N	90°	Caucasus Area	HRS 4/1
B	105	15/17/21	F	90°	India, South Eastern Asia, Australia	HRS 4/4
B	105	15/17	N	90°	Caucasus Area	HRS 4/1
C	106	9/11	F	90°	India, South Eastern Asia, Australia	HRS 4/4
C	107	11/15/17	F	270°	Northern South America, The Caribbean	HRS 4/4
C	108	6/7	F	90°	India, South Eastern Asia, Australia	HRS 4/4
D	109	9/11	F	270°	Northern South America, The Caribbean	HRS 4/4
D	110	9/11	F	90°	India, South Eastern Asia, Australia	HRS 4/4
D	110	9/11	N	90°	Caucasus Area	HRS 4/1
D	111	11/15/17	F	90°	India, South Eastern Asia, Australia	HRS 4/4
D	111	11/15	N	90°	Caucasus Area	HRS 4/1
E	112	9/11	F	300°	Eastern North America, Mexico	HRS 4/4
E	113	17/21/26	F	300°	Eastern North America, Mexico	HRS 4/4
E	114	6/7	F	120°	The Balkans, Eastern Mediterranean Area	HRS 4/4
F	115	11/15/17	F	300°	Eastern North America, Mexico	HRS 4/4
F	116	15/17/21	F	300°	Eastern North America, Mexico	HRS 4/4
F	117	6/7	F	120°	The Balkans, Eastern Mediterranean Area	HRS 4/4
G	118	6/7	F	300°	Eastern North America, Mexico	HRS 4/4
G	119	7/9	F	120°	The Balkans, Eastern Mediterranean Area	HRS 4/4
G	119	7/9	N	120°	The Balkan Area	HRS 4/1
G	120	11/15/17	F	120°	The Balkans, Eastern Mediterranean Area	HRS 4/4
G	120	15/17	N	120°	The Balkan Area	HRS 4/1
H	121	9/11/15	F	300°	Eastern North America, Mexico	HRS 4/4
H	122	17/21/26	F	120°	The Balkans, Eastern Mediterranean Area	HRS 4/4
H	123	21/26	F	120°	The Balkans, Eastern Mediterranean Area	HRS 4/4
J	124	6/7	F	120°	The Balkans, Eastern Mediterranean Area	HRS 4/4

==== Bank 2, South-East ====
Place	No	Frequencies (MHz)	Mode	Azimuth	Destination	Form
A	201	6/7	F	210°	Western Africa	HRS 4/4
A	202	7/9	F	30°	China, Pacific	HRS 4/4
A	202	9/11	N	30°	Southern Russia, China	HRS 4/1
A	203	11/15/17	F	30°	China, Pacific	HRS 4/4
B	204	9/11	F	210°	Western Africa	HRS 4/4
B	205	11/15/17	F	210°	Western Africa	HRS 4/4
B	206	6/7	F	30°	China, Pacific	HRS 4/4
C	207	6/7	F	240°	South America	HRS 4/4
C	208	9/11	F	60°	Eastern Europe, Russia, China	HRS 4/4
C	209	21/26	F	60°	Eastern Europe, Russia, China	HRS 4/4
D	210	9/11	F	240°	South America	HRS 4/4
D	211	11/15/17	F	240°	South America	HRS 4/4
D	212	7/9	F	60°	Eastern Europe, Russia, China	HRS 4/4
E	213	9/11/15	F	240°	South America	HRS 4/4
E	214	15/17/21	F	60°	Eastern Europe, Russia, China	HRS 4/4
E	215	17/21/26	F	60°	Eastern Europe, Russia, China	HRS 4/4
F	216	21/26	F	240°	South America	HRS 4/4
F	217	17/21/26	F	240°	South America	HRS 4/4
F	218	11/15/17	F	60°	Eastern Europe, Russia, China	HRS 4/4
G	219	6 - 11	N	45°	European Russia	HRS 4/1
x	220	6 - 11	B	75°	Central Asia, Southern Russia	HRS 2/2
x	220	6 - 11	S	75°	Central Asia, Southern Russia	HRS 4/2
x	221	6 - 11	F	60°	Eastern Europe, Russia	HRS 2/4
x	222	6 - 11	F	60°	Eastern Europe, Russia	HRS 2/4
x	223	6 - 11	N	60°	Eastern Europe, Russia	HRS 2/2
x	224	6 - 22	L	60°	Eastern Europe, Russia	LogPer
x	225	6/7	B	60°	Eastern Europe, Russia	HRS 2/2
x	225	6/7	S	60°	Eastern Europe, Russia	HRS 4/2
x	226	6/7	Q	ND	MittelCentral Europe	Quadrant

==== Bank 3, South-West ====
Place	No	Frequencies (MHz)	Mode	Azimuth	Destination	Form
A	301	15/17/21	F	330°	Western North America	HRS 4/4
A	302	21/26	F	150°	East and South Africa	HRS 4/4
B	303	11/15/17	F	330°	Western North America	HRS 4/4
B	304	9/11	F	330°	Western North America	HRS 4/4
B	305	7/9	F	150°	East and South Africa	HRS 4/4
C	306	6/7	F	330°	Western North America	HRS 4/4
C	307	17/21/26	F	150°	East and South Africa	HRS 4/4
C	308	11/15/21	F	150°	East and South Africa	HRS 4/4
D	309	6/7	F	330°	Western North America	HRS 4/4
D	310	15/17/21	F	150°	East and South Africa	HRS 4/4
D	311	9/11	F	150°	East and South Africa	HRS 4/4
E	312	9/11/15	F	330°	Western North America	HRS 4/4
F	313	9/11	N	120°	The Balkan Area	HRS 4/2
x	314	6	Q	ND	Central Europe	Quadrant
x	315	6/7	Q	ND	Central Europe	Quadrant
x	316	9/11	Q	ND	Central Europe	Quadrant
x	317	15/17	Q	ND	Central Europe	Quadrant

Description to mode
F = long distance antenna, N = short distance antenna,
Q = quadrant antenna (omnidirectional), L = log-periodic antenna,
B = horizontal wide beam (about 45°), S = horizontal narrow beam (about 30°)

== The end of broadcasting ==
In early 2014, it was rumored that the Wertachtal site was going to be completely destroyed by May 2014. The newest transmitter, installed in 2003, was dismantled and reinstalled at transmitter site in Nauen, where it was used with a rotatable antenna installed in 1964. Some other equipment was bought by Austrian broadcaster Österreichische Rundfunksender GmbH for its site at Moosbrunn. Anything that couldn't be sold was scrapped. At the end of November 2014, the last pillars of the site were removed. In 2015, scrap metal and any remaining equipment were removed. The site is used since 2017 as a solar power station, with a power of 35 MWc.

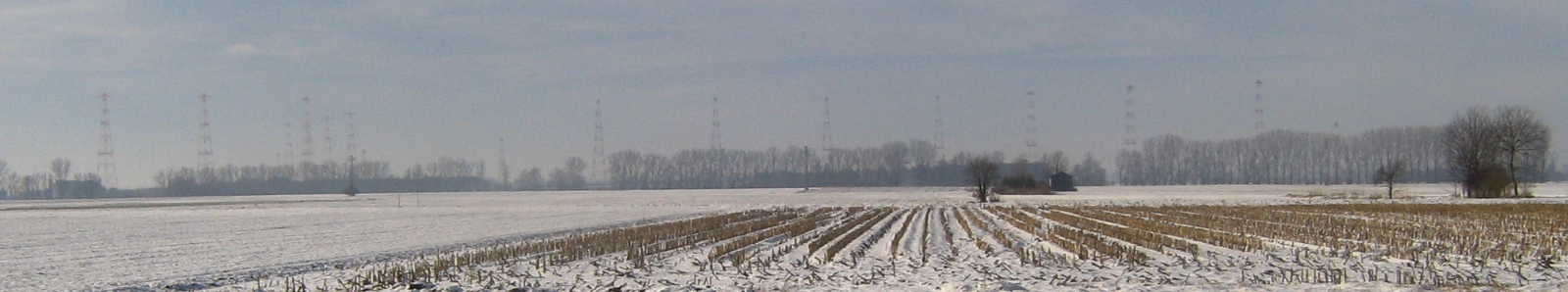
General view to transmitter site from SO in 2008
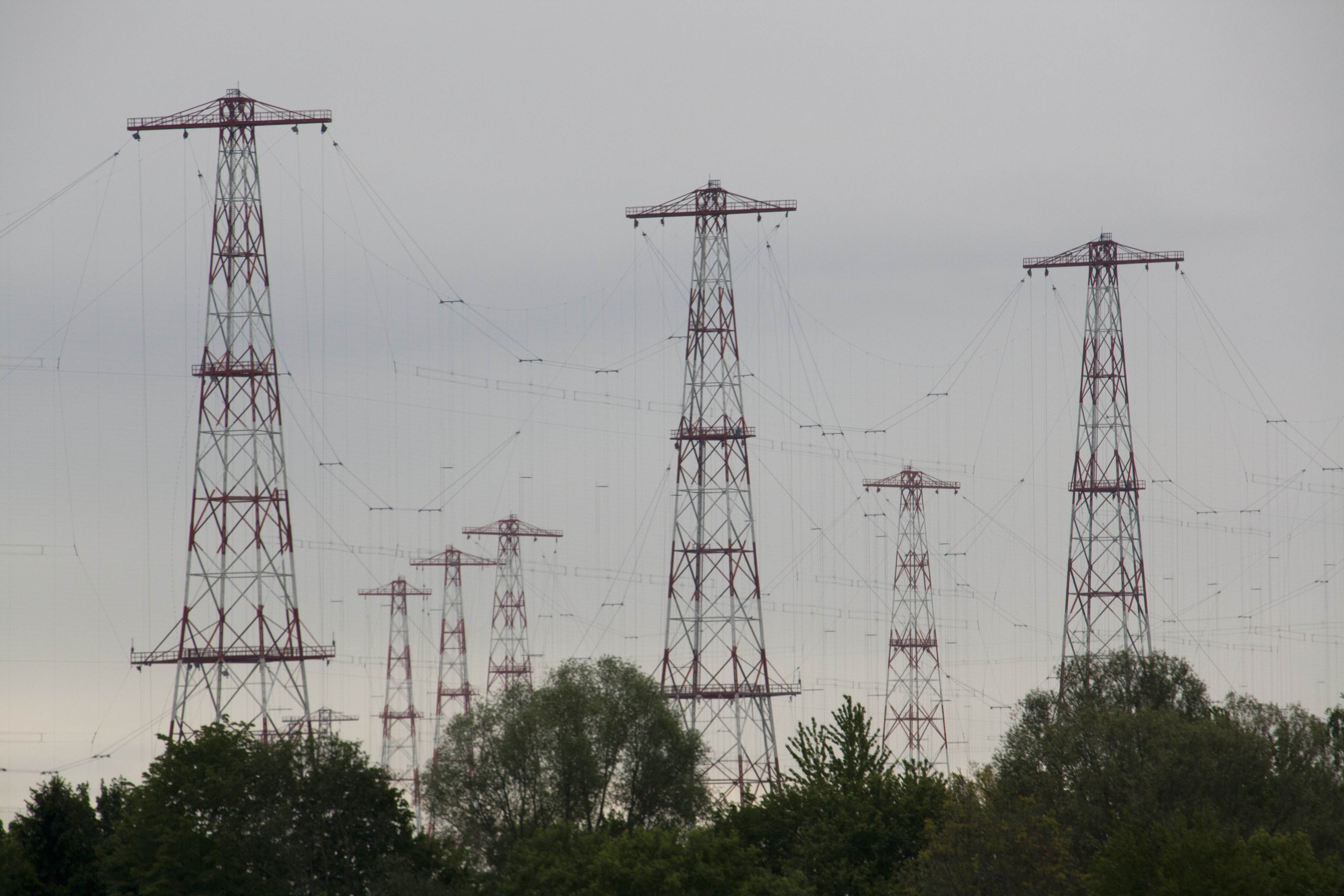
Curtain antennas in 2008

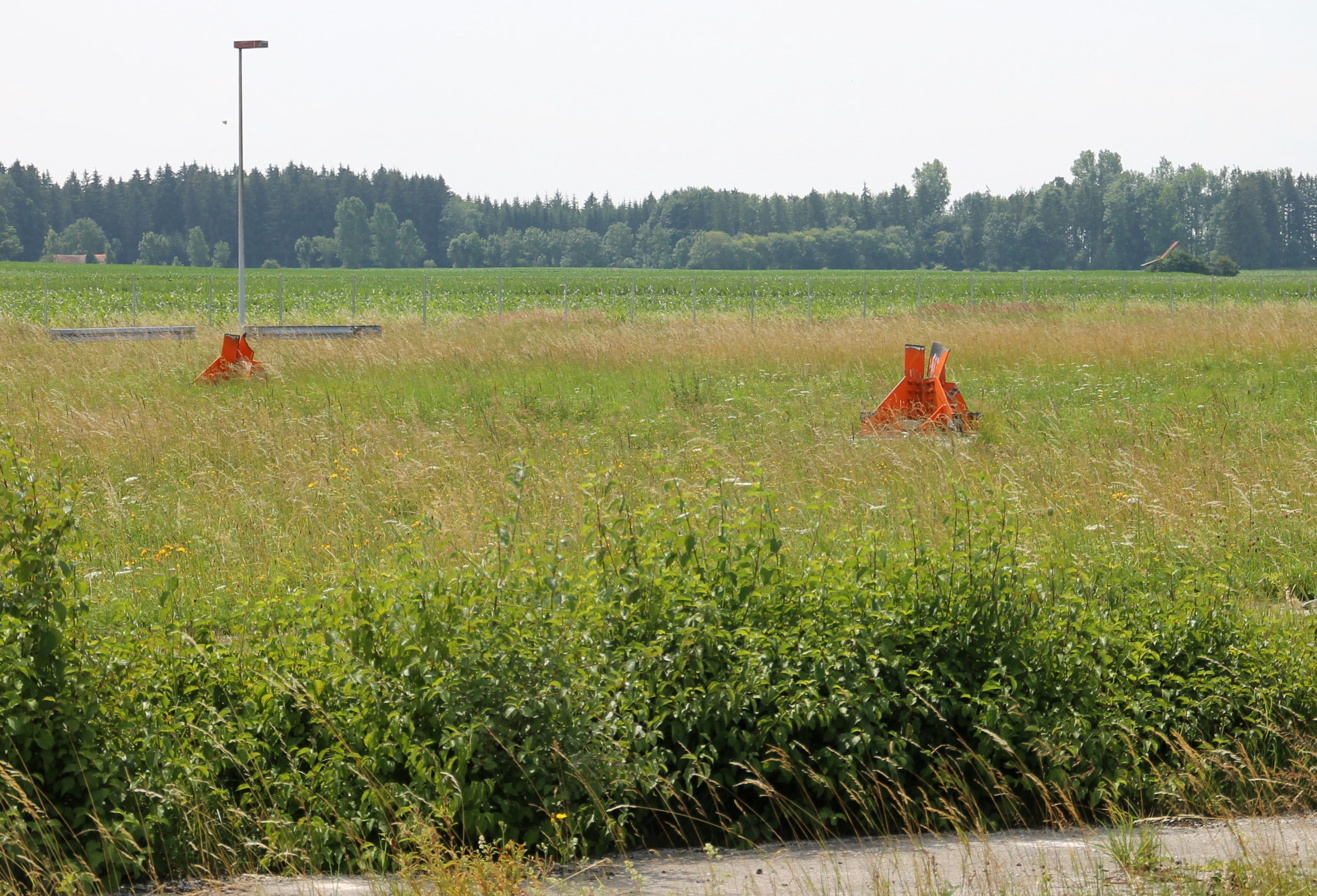
Remnants of tower foundations, in July 2015

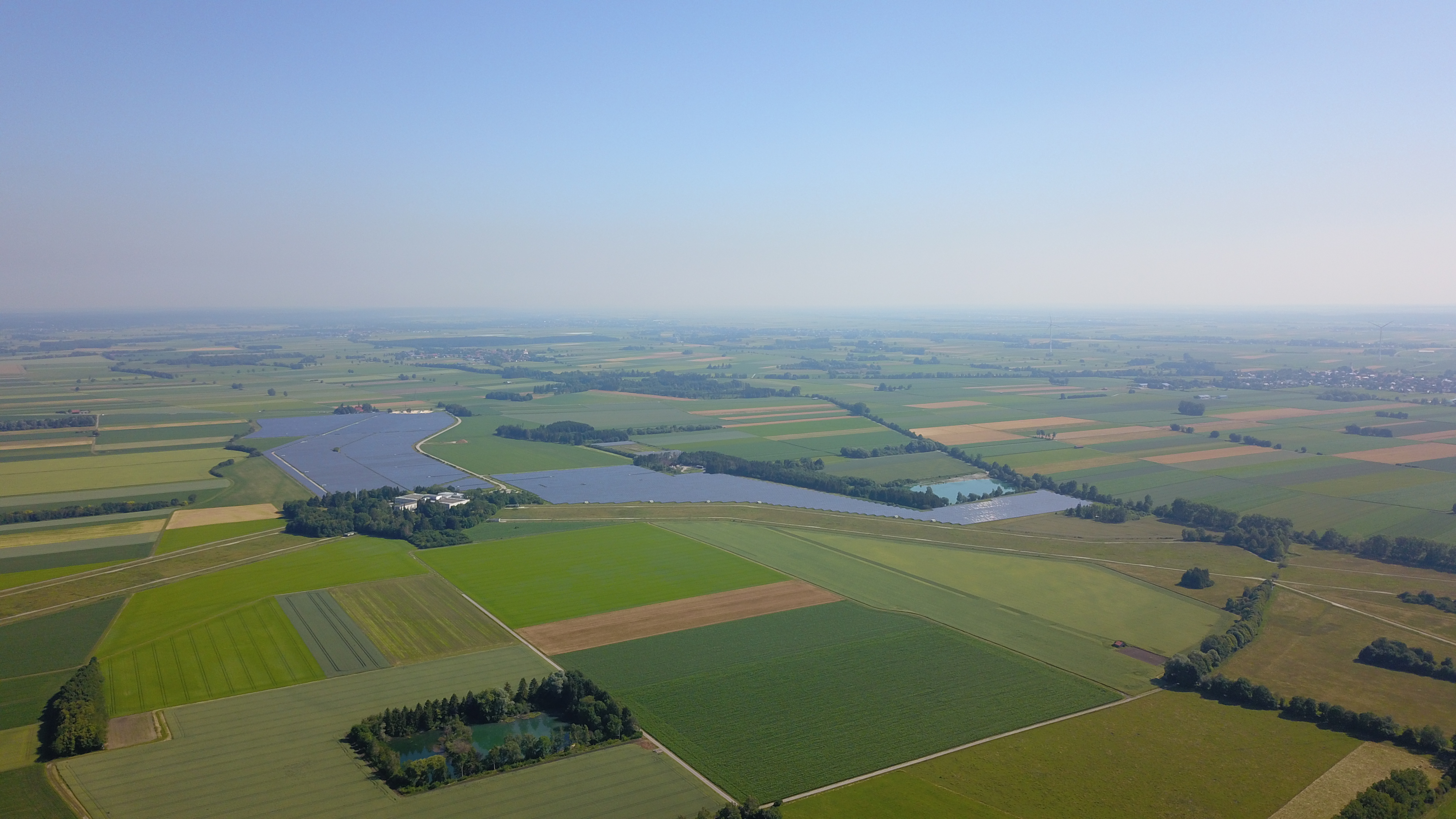
Aerial view of the solar power farm at the site in 2018

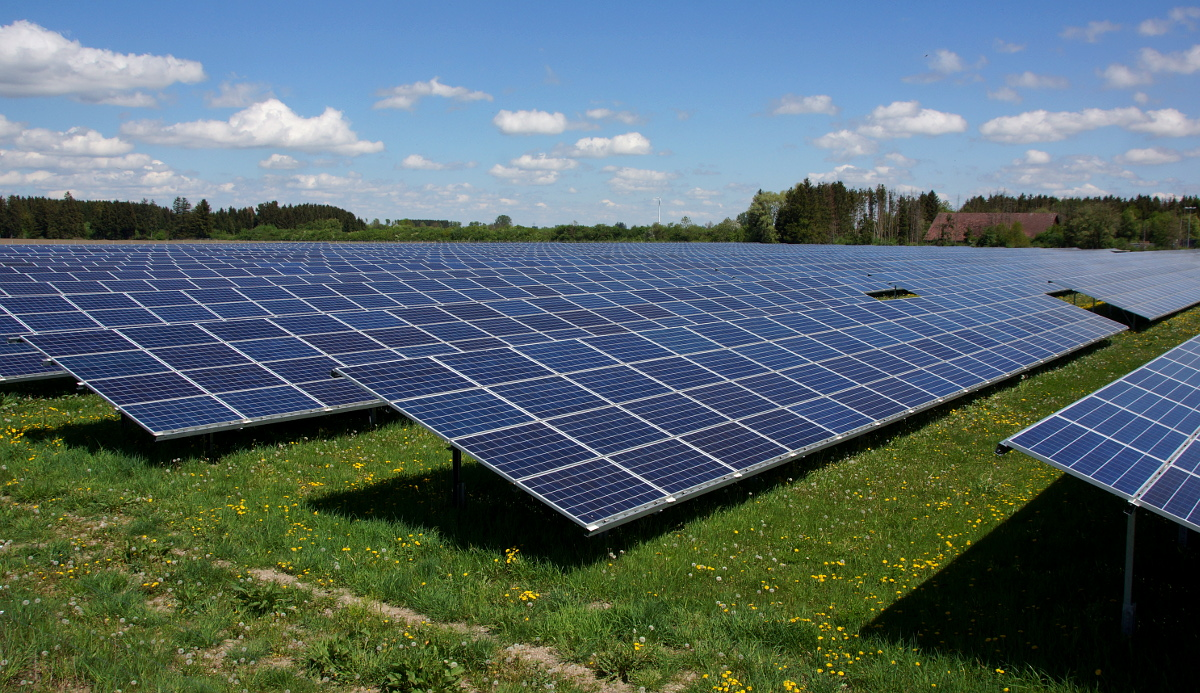
Part of the solar power farm in April 2018.

== See also ==
- CKCX, similar technical configuration, operating out of Sackville, New Brunswick, Canada
