= CKCX =

Former CBC shortwave radio station near Sackville, New Brunswick, Canada

Defunct

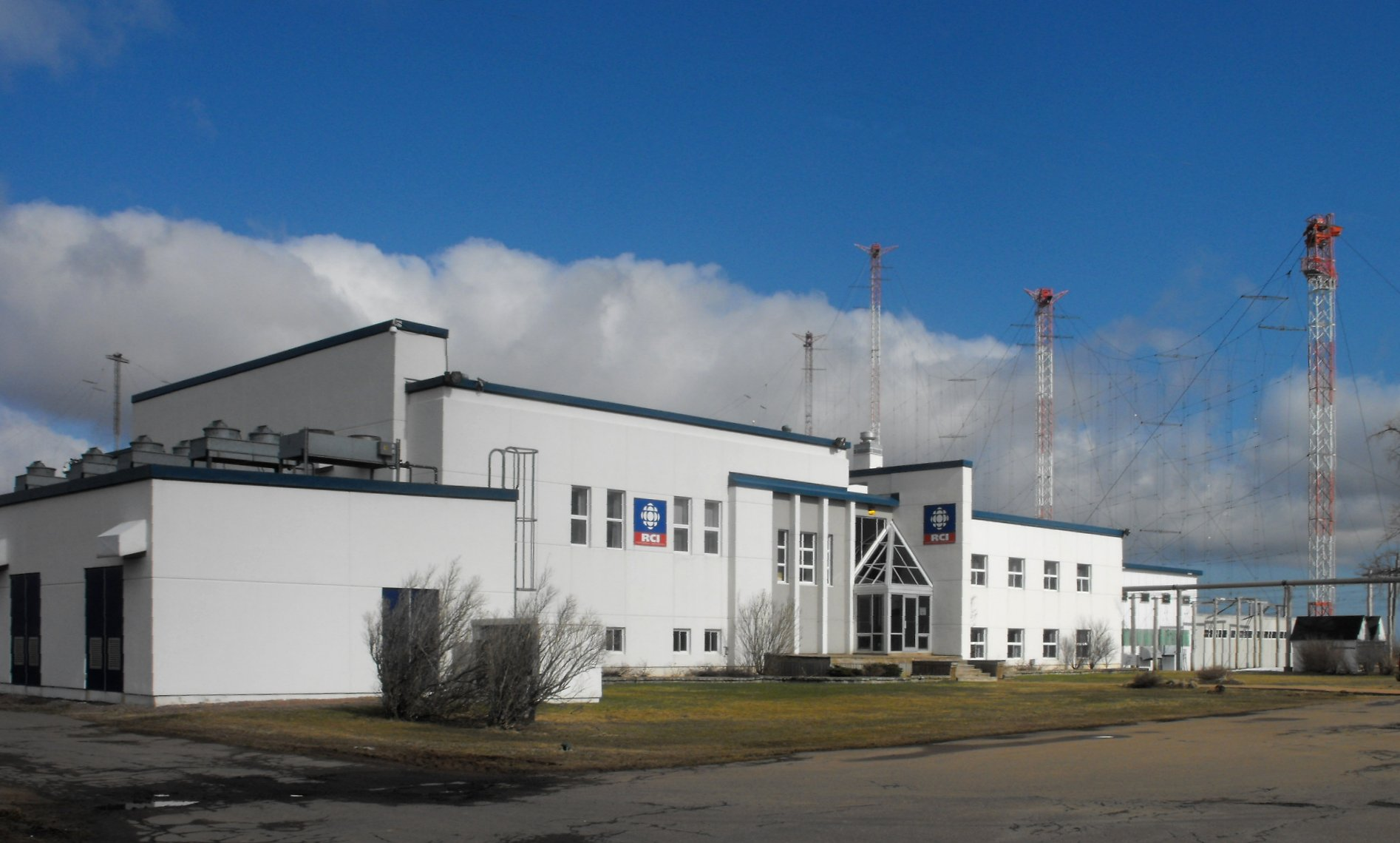

Sackville, New Brunswick; Canada
- Frequencies: 9.625 MHz (Northern service); Various (international)

Programming
- Format: Shortwave radio

Ownership
- Owner: Canadian Broadcasting Corporation

History
- First air date: 1968
- Last air date: December 1, 2012
- Former call signs: CBA

Technical information
- Transmitter coordinates: 45.8923679°N 64.321239°W

CKCX was the call sign used for the Canadian Broadcasting Corporation's shortwave transmitter complex near Sackville, New Brunswick at the Tantramar Marshes. The Sackville Relay Station was operated by Radio Canada International and broadcast its programming around the world as well as relay transmissions from several foreign shortwave broadcasters. Domestically, it transmitted broadcasts on 9.625 MHz to northern Quebec by CBC North, the James Bay Cree Communications Society and Taqramiut Nipingat, the Inuit communications society of the Nunavik region of northern Quebec. The CKCX designation was assigned after CBC Radio's CBA, under whose licence the Sackville complex originally operated, moved to Moncton in 1968. Sackville was also used by Radio Japan, China Radio International, Voice of Vietnam, BBC World Service, Deutsche Welle and Radio Korea as part of a transmitter time exchange agreement.

== History ==
The site at Sackville was originally built in 1938 for CBC local broadcasting over radio station CBA. In 1943, two RCA shortwave transmitters were installed. In 1970, all CBC operations moved to Moncton. This move was necessary so as to allow new Collins transmitters to be installed.

In the mid-1980s, the RCA transmitters were replaced by the three, more modern, Harris transmitters.

== Decommissioning and demolition ==
Radio Canada International's shortwave service was shut down in June 2012 due to Canadian Broadcasting Corporation budget cuts as a result of reduced federal subsidies. As a result the Canadian Broadcasting Corporation sought to sell the Sackville site to either another international broadcaster or a wind farm company. According to Martin Marcotte, director of CBC Transmission: "[The Sackville complex] will be fairly costly to dismantle and as a last resort we would dismantle the facility, return it to bare land as it was when we first acquired that site." The transmission site was officially closed on October 31, 2012, at the conclusion of several contracts leasing transmitter time to international broadcasters. The site, however, continued to be used until December 1, 2012, for transmission of CBC's Northern Quebec service until the installation of several low power transmitters in the target region could be completed. The CRTC granted a request by the CBC to revoke CKCX's license effective December 1, 2012. The site was subsequently dismantled. After failing to receive any bids to purchase the complex, the antennas were dismantled and transmission towers demolished in 2014.

RCI's parent, the Canadian Broadcasting Corporation, was the owner and operator of the Sackville transmission site, call sign CKCX. RCI's only transmitter site was located on the Tantramar Marshes several kilometres (miles) east of the town of Sackville, New Brunswick. RCI leased or bartered its spare transmission capacity with other international broadcasters. Sackville was the only high power shortwave relay station in Canada and also transmitted CBC North broadcasts to northern Quebec.

== Technology ==
The Sackville facility was an impressive mixture of diverse technologies. The whole facility was controlled by computer automation which was centralized in the main control room. Frequencies, antennas, and input feeds are switched all according to internationally agreed upon schedules which were renegotiated twice per year with other countries.

Sackville transmitter power level breakdown

- There were 9 transmitters in operation in 2012.
- (3 or 4) x 100 kW
- (3 or 4) x 250 kW
- 3 x 300 kW
- The site was capable of utilizing 500 kW transmitters, but the end of the Cold War and improved shortwave frequency coordination made upgrading to 500 kW unnecessary.

The newest Asea Brown Boveri (ABB) transmitters used a "pulse-step" type modulation (PSM). All Sackville ABB transmitters had 250 kW output, although there were some newer Thales transmitters that are 300 kW. Thales transmitters could use APDM (Adaptive PDM) the design successor to PSM (partly based on PSM modulation).

All modern Sackville SW transmitters incorporated Dynamic Carrier Control (DCC) of some kind.

- DCC causes the carrier level to be automatically reduced when there are lower levels or no audio.
- During periods of silence (no audio), the carrier power was reduced by 50%, so the 250 kW transmitter put out a carrier of 125 kW during audio pauses. This saved otherwise wasted empty carrier power.

== Site layout ==
Sackville had a site layout similar to the Wertachtal Shortwave Relay Station, with a few substantial differences.

- Wertachtal has 3 arms of HRS type antennas that are spaced at ~120 degrees; Sackville Relay Station only approximates this configuration.
- The Wertachtal configuration allows for near 360 degree coverage of the world.
- Wertachtal exclusively contains HRS type transmission antennas, whereas Sackville does not.
- Sackville site configuration information supported this comparison, with respect to HRS type antenna azimuths.

=== Site configuration ===
This site configuration data is known to be accurate for 2004-2005.

Transmitters (configuration not fully verified)

- 3 × 250 kW SW (1993–1995, ABB: SK 53 C3-2)
- 3 × 100 kW SW (1983, Harris: SW-100A) this transmitter is under démolition (3 Harris) July 2012
- 3 × (Unknown power) (Unknown models)
- A new SW transmitter has been acquired that is DRM capable.

It known that at least one SW transmitter had been outfitted to transmit DRM at this time.

Antennas (Type, Bearing) (configuration not fully verified)

- HR 4/4/1.0 (60 degrees)
- HR 4/2/1.0 (105 degrees)
- HR 4/4/1.0 (163 degrees)
- HR 4/4/1.0 (176 degrees)
- HR 4/4/1.0 (189 degrees)
- HR 2/4/1.0 (227 degrees)
- HR 2/4/1.0 (240 degrees)
- HR 4/4/1.0 (240 degrees)
- HR 4/4/1.0 (272 degrees)
- HR 2/1/0.5 (277 degrees)

To better understand the ITU HR antenna notation, see the HRS type antennas guide.

== See also ==
- CKCX/RCI at The History of Canadian Broadcasting by the Canadian Communications Foundation
