= Eric Koch =

Canadian author, broadcaster and academic

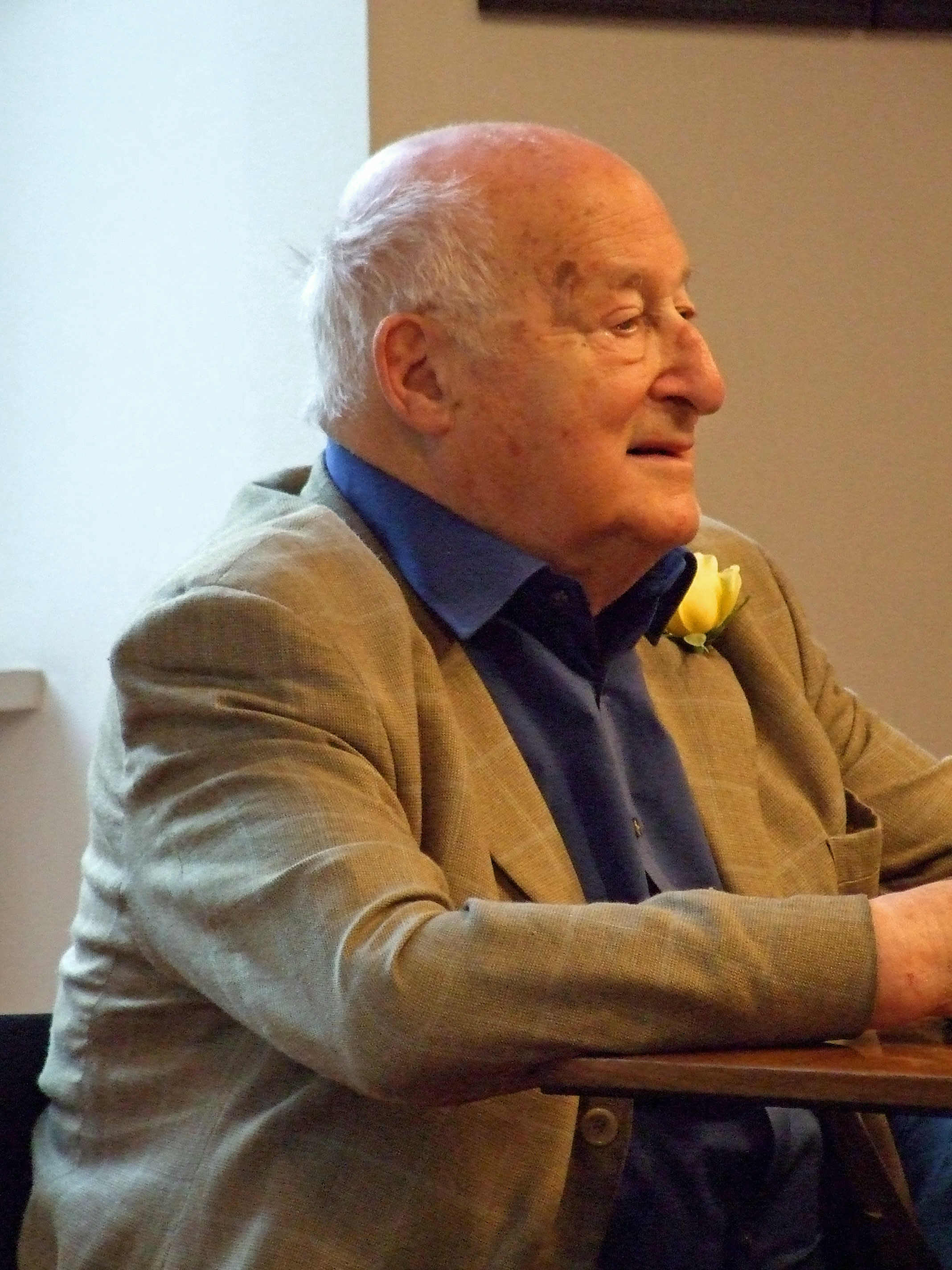
- Eric Koch in Frankfurt am Main in 2009
- Born: Erich Koch; 31 August 1919; Frankfurt, Germany
- Died: 28 April 2018 (aged 98); Toronto, Ontario, Canada
- Other name: Otto Koch
- Occupations: Author, broadcaster, professor
- Spouse: Sonia
- Children: 3

Eric Otto Koch (31 August 1919 – 28 April 2018) was a German-born Canadian author, broadcaster and academic.

== Life ==
Koch was born in 1919 into a prominent assimilated German Jewish family. His grandfather was a court jeweller and his father, Otto, was an officer in the German Army during World War I who died during routine surgery while Koch was still an infant. The young Erich Koch was renamed Otto in memory of his father.

In 1935, after the Nazis took power, he was sent by his family to boarding school in England, where he was enrolled at Cranbrook School in Kent before enrolling at St. John's College, Cambridge, to study economics and then law. In 1940, he and other Germans resident in Britain were detained as enemy aliens. Koch was deported to Canada where he remained at an internment camp in Sherbrooke, Quebec until 1941 when he and most of his fellow internees were recognised by the government as "victims of Nazi aggression" and released. His mother, who had escaped Germany before war broke out, contacted the Birks family in Montreal, jewellers who were friends of the Koch family, and put him in their care. His guardians suggested he change his name from Otto as it was too German a name to have in wartime and so Koch anglicized his original name of Erich to Eric. Having been granted his economics degree by Cambridge in absentia, Koch resumed his studies at the University of Toronto where he completed his law degree, paying for his education by writing articles for an encyclopedia.

After completing university in 1943, Koch found work teaching French at Appleby College for two terms, and then worked as a writer for Saturday Night magazine.

In 1944, he was recruited to join the German Section of the Canadian Broadcasting Corporation's new International Service broadcasting programmes from Montreal to Germany, initially as part of Canada's psychological warfare campaign during World War II and subsequently as part of efforts to educate Germans in democracy. Koch remained with the CBC for 35 years, eventually moving to the domestic English language service of CBC and serving from 1953 to 1967 as a member of the Department of Talks and Public Affairs in Toronto. In the 1960s, he was a producer of the CBC-TV talk show Take 30 and hired future Governor General of Canada Adrienne Clarkson as a reporter for the show. In 1964, he became the supervising producer of the groundbreaking and controversial current affairs programme This Hour Has Seven Days, later writing a book about the program. He was promoted in 1967 to Area Head, Arts and Science and was responsible for the creation of a large number of radio and television programmes. Among the people he hired were Barbara Amiel and David Suzuki. From 1971 to 1977, he served as regional director in Montreal.

He retired from the CBC in 1979 in order to focus on writing books and teaching at York University, where he was a course director in the Social Science Division and taught a course on The Politics of Canadian Broadcasting for 18 years, into his eighties.

Koch was also on the board of directors of the Couchiching Conference for many years, especially involved in organizing the annual conferences.

He published his first novel at the age of 50, The French Kiss, about Charles de Gaulle and Quebec, and over the next 48 years went on to write a total of 15 novels in English, one novel in German, a play, varying in genre from satire to historical fiction, and five works of non-fiction. Hilmar and Odette, the story of two of his half-Jewish relatives who remained in Germany during World War II and their contrasting fates, was awarded the Yad Vashem Prize for Holocaust Writing in 1996.

His historical fiction has been set in the recent German past, particularly the period from the late 19th century and into the Weimar Republic, and has been published in Germany as well as Canada. Koch died in April 2018 at the age of 98, on the day his final novel, Beethoven’s Locket, was launched.

== Works ==
=== Satirical fiction ===
- The French Kiss: A Tongue-In-Cheek Political Fantasy (1969)
- The Leisure Riots (1973)
- The Last Thing You'd Want to Know (1976)
- Goodnight, Little Spy (1979)

=== Historical fiction ===
- Icon In Love: A Novel About Goethe (1999)
- The Man Who Knew Charlie Chaplin (2000)
- Earrings: Baden-Baden 1885 (2002)
- Premonitions: A novel (2008)
- Arabian nights! 1914: a novel about Kaiser Wilhelm II (2010)
- The Weimar Triangle (2010)
- Beethoven’s Locket (2018)

=== Science fiction ===
- Kassandrus (1988)
- C.R.U.P.P.: Two Science Fiction Novels (1990; contains The Leisure Riots and The Last Thing You'd Want to Know)

=== Non-fiction ===
- Success of a mission: Lord Durham in Canada (1961)
- Deemed Suspect: A Wartime Blunder (1980) (biographical)
- Inside Seven Days: The Show That Shook the Nation (1986)
- Hilmar and Odette: Two Stories from the Nazi Era (1995)
- The Brothers Hambourg (1997)
- I Remember the Location Exactly (2010) (family history)
- The Golden Years: Encounters with Glenn Gould, Marshall McLuhan, Lester B. Pearson, René Lévesque and John G. Diefenbaker (2013)
- Otto and Daria: A Wartime Journey Through No Man's Land (2016) (biographical)
