= Channel Africa =

International broadcasting service by South Africa

- Type: Radio network
- Country: South Africa
- Availability: International
- Owner: South African Broadcasting Corporation
- Launch date: 1 October 1992
- Official website: channelafrica.co.za

Channel Africa is the international broadcasting service of the South African Broadcasting Corporation.

== History ==
Airing on satellite radio and Internet radio platforms, the service airs news, cultural, sports and public affairs programming focusing on South Africa and the African continent.

Channel Africa evolved out of Radio RSA, a similar service which was closely associated with the South African apartheid regime.

Since the advent of the new democratic dispensation in 1994, Channel Africa, the international radio service of the SABC has been engaged in the process of redefining itself and repositioning itself so that it is in line with the new democratic values underpinning the new South Africa. During this period, Channel Africa was faced with the task of formulating a vision and a mission that would cast the station as a major role player in the field of continental and international broadcasting.

Channel Africa broadcasts live on two platforms: satellite and Internet. Its broadcasts are in Chewa, Silozi, Swahili, English, French and Portuguese. The satellite broadcast is via PAS 10 and is accessible through SENTECH's vivid decoders.

The discontinued shortwave broadcast covered south, east, central and west Africa. The satellite broadcast covers the sub-Saharan region although it can be picked as far as London. The Internet broadcast covers the entire world.

Programming from Channel Africa last aired on the World Radio Network in 2007.

In February 2019, the South Africa-based company, Sentech, announced that they would close the Meyerton Transmitting Station effective 31 March 2019. Channel Africa used the Meyerton site for all of their shortwave broadcasts. The closure ended Channel Africa's shortwave service.

== Broadcasts ==
Channel Africa broadcasts through the Intelsat 20 satellite at 11.514 MHz, vertical polarization, azimuth 68.5 degrees east, signal speed: 28,750 MSym / s, Standard: DVB-S2. Channel Africa also streams on the Internet.
