= Radio RSA =

South African international broadcaster

- Type: International shortwave radio service
- Country: South Africa
- Availability: International
- Headquarters: Johannesburg, South Africa
- Owner: South African Broadcasting Corporation
- Launch date: 1 May 1966
- Dissolved: 1992
- Former names: Radio Republic of South Africa

Radio RSA: The Voice of South Africa was the international broadcasting service of the Republic of South Africa. Operated by the South African Broadcasting Corporation (SABC), it was formally launched on 1 May 1966 and broadcast on shortwave radio to audiences in Africa, Europe, North America and the Middle East.

The service was created during the apartheid era to present the South African government's view of the country and to counter international criticism of apartheid. Its broadcasts combined news, commentary, magazine programmes, music, sport, religion and cultural features, but its news and political content reflected the positions of the South African government and the ruling National Party.

Radio RSA was discontinued in 1992, during South Africa's transition away from apartheid. The SABC subsequently replaced the service with Channel Africa, which was repositioned after the democratic transition of 1994 as the SABC's international radio service for Africa and the wider world.

== Background ==
South Africa's apartheid government faced growing international criticism after the Sharpeville massacre in 1960, the banning of the African National Congress and Pan Africanist Congress of Azania, and the country's withdrawal from the Commonwealth of Nations in 1961. Radio became one of the instruments used by the state to address foreign audiences directly. Fortein describes Radio RSA as part of a wider "battle of the airwaves" in southern Africa, in which state-controlled and liberation-movement broadcasters competed to define South Africa's political reality for audiences inside and outside the country.

The launch of Radio RSA was announced in 1965, shortly before Rhodesia's Unilateral Declaration of Independence. Somerville argues that the station's early broadcasts reflected South Africa's attempt to defend apartheid and "separate development", while also presenting the country as a stable, anti-communist and pro-Western power in southern Africa.

Prime Minister Hendrik Verwoerd described the proposed external service as a means of presenting a "faithful picture" of South Africa's way of life and of promoting goodwill, understanding and cooperation. Critics in Parliament, however, described the service as propaganda, and government supporters acknowledged that the broadcasts would include talks and commentary intended to counter international criticism of South Africa.

== Launch and aims ==
Radio RSA went on the air on 1 May 1966 from Johannesburg. The service was also known as Radio Republic of South Africa and used the slogan "The Voice of South Africa". It was broadcast only on shortwave and was aimed primarily at audiences outside South Africa.

The target areas initially included Africa, Europe, the United States, Canada and the Middle East. By the later 1960s, additional transmitters allowed the service to be heard across much of Africa, North America, Latin America, the Middle East and western Europe; Fortein states that reception was reported as far away as Japan.

The station's stated objectives included promoting South Africa abroad, countering what the government described as false or hostile propaganda, encouraging trade and tourism, and strengthening international friendships. In practice, scholars have described the service as a form of state counter-propaganda designed to defend apartheid South Africa's international image.

== Management and political control ==
Radio RSA was operated by the SABC but was closely tied to the government's information and foreign-affairs apparatus. During the apartheid era, the SABC was a state-controlled broadcaster whose senior leadership and editorial policy were aligned with the National Party government.

The Department of Information was responsible for promoting South Africa's image internationally and reducing criticism of apartheid. After the Muldergate scandal of the late 1970s, the functions of the Department of Information were reorganised, and the Department of Foreign Affairs took over responsibility for Radio RSA's external information role. Horwitz gives the station's annual budget in this period as about 20 million rand.

== Programming ==
Radio RSA broadcast news bulletins, commentaries, current-affairs talks, music, magazine programmes, sport, religious items and cultural features. A 1981 survey of international broadcasting stated that the station carried 42 news bulletins and 21 news commentaries daily in languages including English, Afrikaans, Dutch, German, Portuguese, French, Swahili, Chichewa, Tsonga and Lozi.

The number of languages changed over time. In 1976, Radio RSA was reported to be broadcasting in 12 languages, including English, French, German, Portuguese and Afrikaans. Fortein states that the service had the capacity to broadcast in 11 languages, including English, French, Portuguese, German, Dutch, Afrikaans and Spanish. In 1984, 11 languages were listed for the service.

Radio RSA's programmes were designed for different regional audiences. Programming for Africa received particular emphasis. McCavitt states that 23 of Radio RSA's 26 weekly shortwave hours in the late 1970s were devoted especially to Africa. Later sources indicate that the service expanded substantially during the 1980s.

The station also published listener material, including RSA Calling, a programme magazine of the SABC's External Service. The magazine carried programme information, listener correspondence and promotional articles about South Africa.

== Facilities ==
Radio RSA's studios were initially located at Broadcast House on Commissioner Street in Johannesburg. The SABC moved from Broadcast House to its present Auckland Park complex in 1976.

The shortwave transmitting facilities were located at Bloemendal, near Meyerton, Gauteng, south of Johannesburg. The site was also known as the H. F. Verwoerd Transmitting Station. Transmitters used for Radio RSA included high-power shortwave units of 250 kW and 500 kW.

After Radio RSA was discontinued, the Bloemendal/Meyerton shortwave site continued to be used for South African external broadcasting, including Channel Africa. It was later operated by Sentech. The facility was closed in 2019, ending South Africa's remaining shortwave international broadcasts from the site.

== Identification and interval signal ==
The station identification in English was: "This is Radio RSA, the Voice of South Africa, from Johannesburg." Similar identifications were used in other languages, including French: "Ici Radio RSA, la Voix de l'Afrique du Sud."

Radio RSA's interval signal was associated with the call of the bokmakierie, a South African bird, together with the old South African song "Ver in die wêreld, Kittie".

== Role in apartheid-era broadcasting ==
Radio RSA was part of South Africa's external public diplomacy and propaganda strategy during apartheid. Fortein describes it as an apartheid-controlled station designed to broadcast a favourable image of South Africa to international audiences and to counter criticism of the government. Wasburn characterises the service as a counter-propaganda broadcaster, arguing that it sought to challenge what South Africa regarded as hostile foreign reporting while presenting South Africa as modern, stable and strategically important.

The station's political role was especially significant in Africa. Somerville's study of Radio RSA's early coverage of African independence and Rhodesia's UDI argues that the station attempted to present South Africa as a bulwark of Western civilisation and anti-communism, while managing the government's ambivalent public position toward white-minority Rhodesia.

Radio RSA also formed part of a wider contest with anti-apartheid broadcasters such as the ANC's Radio Freedom. Fortein notes that ANC members in exile monitored Radio RSA because it carried official South African information that could be useful to the liberation movement. Conversely, Radio Freedom and other liberation broadcasters sought to counter the SABC's domestic and international narratives about apartheid and anti-apartheid resistance.

== Closure and replacement by Channel Africa ==
Radio RSA was discontinued in 1992 as South Africa moved toward a negotiated end to apartheid. The SABC's own historical timeline states that the "Voice of South Africa", which had gone on air as Radio RSA, was changed to Channel Africa in 1992.

Channel Africa became the SABC's post-apartheid international radio service. Since the democratic transition of 1994, Channel Africa has described itself as the SABC's international radio service, focused on news, current affairs and cultural programming for African and international audiences.

== Legacy ==
Radio RSA was one of the major international shortwave broadcasters operated by an African state during the Cold War and apartheid eras. It was technically ambitious, multilingual and widely targeted, but its reputation was shaped by its association with apartheid-era state information policy.

The service's replacement by Channel Africa reflected the broader transformation of South African broadcasting after apartheid. Whereas Radio RSA had been used to defend the international image of the apartheid state, Channel Africa was later repositioned to reflect the democratic South Africa's foreign-policy and continental broadcasting objectives.

== See also ==
- Channel Africa
- South African Broadcasting Corporation
- Radio Freedom
- International broadcasting
- Shortwave radio
- Muldergate scandal
- Apartheid
