= Dynamic carrier control =

Dynamic carrier control (DCC) is a method of reducing power consumption in radio transmitters during periods of low audio activity or silence. It is a type of Modulation-Dependent Carrier Level control, or MDCL. All modern high-power (>50 kW) shortwave radio transmitters incorporate DCC of some kind, as well as some mediumwave (MW) transmitters.

DCC causes the carrier wave level to be automatically reduced when the audio is very weak or no audio is present. During periods of silence (no audio), the carrier power is reduced by 50%, so the 250 kW transmitter is putting out a carrier of 125 kW during audio pauses. This carrier power reduction saves electricity.

== History ==
This amplitude modulation (and vestigial SSB modulation) energy-saving mode was devised in the late 1930s. The system was originally referred to as the Hapsburg Carrier System. DCC was not implemented in transmitter designs until the 1980s, because of some of the complexities of the control circuit.

- DCC's development is linked to NATO nations trying to save energy as a result of the ripple effects of OPEC related oil supply crises.
- DCC is still an option on all shortwave transmitters sold on the open market today, since it is almost universally mandated by the purchasers of shortwave transmitters.
- Eastern European manufacturers of shortwave transmitters tended not to adopt DCC because Russia in particular had no energy crises, due to its abundant supply of oil.

== MDCL methods ==
There are two types of Modulation-Dependent Carrier Level (MDCL) control methods: DCC, as discussed above, and Amplitude Modulation Companding (AMC), developed by the BBC. The AMC design achieves the opposite effect of the original DCC system: the carrier is at maximum when no audio is present, and is reduced by up to 75% when the audio is loudest. The system uses the carrier to quieten the channel when no audio is present, while still realizing power savings. Both DCC and AMC have been a staple in European MW broadcasting for many years, and now AMC is now being used by stations in North America.

Both the above MDCL methods (DDC and AMC) can be used simultaneously if desired. Some stations choose a mixture of DCC and AMC which uses a complex carrier vs. modulation curve, typically running less carrier for modulation in the 25% to 75% range, and with more carrier during peaks and pauses.

DCC can work with frequency modulation (FM), but was never adopted for high-power FM stereo transmission.

== Advantages and disadvantages of MDCL methods ==
The main reason for using either MDCL method (or the combination of the two) is to save power and money. Alternatively, for the same total power consumption, the transmission coverage can be somewhat improved. The AMC method has two other advantages. It limits the peak voltages on transmitter and antenna circuits, possibly preventing damaging arcs. Also, if the degree of AMC is properly adjusted, the power drawn from the mains can be kept nearly constant with modulation. This is especially important when operating from a local generator. With conventional DCC the load variations on a generator are made worse. With both methods, the main disadvantage is marginal loss of coverage, comparable to running slightly less power. Also in lower signal strength parts of the coverage area, a station using Dynamic Carrier Control may be more likely to be skipped on digital-tuned radios during seek/scan tuning (if the frequency is passed during carrier reduction), an issue compounded by manual tuning (instead of seek/scan) selection not being easy on some receivers.

== Operational use ==
When running a transmitter with DCC, these settings are recommended (according to whom?) to optimize power savings versus the listener's receiver "signal lock" loss.

- DCC (attack, decay) : instantaneous
- DCC (carrier power suppression): 3dB (for third-hop targets)
- DCC (carrier power suppression): 6dB (for first-hop targets)

== Transmitters using DCC ==
Here is a list of manufacturers that offer DCC in their transmitters:

- Ampegon AG (Ex-Thales)
- Continental Electronics
- Nautel
- RIZ
- Telefunken
- Transradio

Analog modes

- A3E AM (incl. DCC)
- H3E SSB
- R3E SSB

According to the ITU Radio Regulations, Geneva 1990, Article 4.
