= Paul Ferdonnet =

Paul Ferdonnet (28 April 1901 – 4 August 1945), dubbed "the Stuttgart traitor" (French: le traître de Stuttgart) by the French press, was a French journalist and Nazi sympathizer who was executed for treason in 1945.

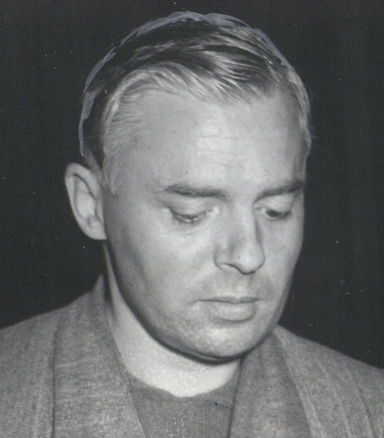
Paul Ferdonnet, 1945

== Biography ==
A Nazi sympathizer, Ferdonnet was known for having published an anti-semitic book, La Guerre Juive (The Jewish War). He relocated to Germany in the 1930s and was an employee of Radio-Stuttgart, where he worked on propaganda broadcasts in French aimed at promoting the Nazi regime and demoralizing French troops and civilians. Ferdonnet was identified in 1939 by French intelligence as the leading French speaker of Radio-Stuttgart. The previously obscure Ferdonnet became famous and notorious, claiming that Britain would let France fight and die on its behalf: "Britain provides the machines, France provides the bodies."

After the fall of France, transmissions in French were progressively discontinued, and Ferdonnet stopped working for Radio-Stuttgart around 1942. He was arrested after the fall of Nazi Germany and executed for treason in 1945. During his trial, Ferdonnet vainly asserted that he had not been the speaker. Some historians consider that he might have merely worked for Radio-Stuttgart as a translator of the scripts submitted by the Germans, his translations being read by another Frenchman. According to writer Maurice-Yvan Sicard (writing under the pseudonym Saint-Paulien and himself as a former collaborationist), the actual speaker was "a former actor named Obrecht," an actor who was never found. Experts on this subject considered this evidence void.
