= Transradio =

German radio communications company

TRANSRADIO SenderSysteme Berlin AG
- Type: Limited company (Aktiengesellschaft)
- Founded: 2005
- Defunct: 2017
- Successor: CESTRON International GmbH
- Headquarters: Teltow, Germany
- Products: Radio transmitters
- Website: now: www.elsyscom.de

TRANSRADIO SenderSysteme Berlin AG was a German radio communication systems producer, specialised in research into and development and design of AM, VHF/FM and DRM as well as military and commercial broadcast systems. For a time, it was a subsidiary of AMPEGON AG, a Swiss company and later an affiliate company of CESTRON International GmbH named Elsyscom GmbH.

== History ==
The name Transradio dates back to 1918 when Transradio was founded as a subsidiary of Telefunken. In 1919, TRANSRADIO-Aktiengesellschaft für drahtlosen Überseeverkehr was the first company to introduce duplex radio transmission worldwide.
Telefunken Sendertechnik GmbH, which had existed since 1989 was renamed Telefunken SenderSysteme Berlin AG in 2000. Five years later the company became TRANSRADIO SenderSysteme Berlin AG. The nominal capital of 1.5 Mio € in 2010 was increased to 1.87 Mio €. After massive losses since 2007 and in spite of further loans to the tune 1.8 Mio € from its majority shareholder Bevita Commercial Corp.(Vaduz), TRANSRADIO filed for insolvency on 1st August 2017.

== Chances ==
The Swiss company AMPEGON AG immediately acquired the TRAM and SICAMP product lines, their productions lines, inventory and a qualified team of technicians. From that they built AM Broadcast GmbH, a new subsidiary of AMPEGON. AMPEGON intended to restart its own production of medium-wave transmitters and service for former TRANSRADIO clients . A short time later the registered business address was changed to Berlin. After the completion of insolvency proceedings TRANSRADIO SenderSysteme Berlin AG was to become a member of the AMPEGON AG. In October 2019 AMPEGON made an announcement stating that a decision had been made in 2012 to sell the parts of the business involved with producing broadcasting equipment.

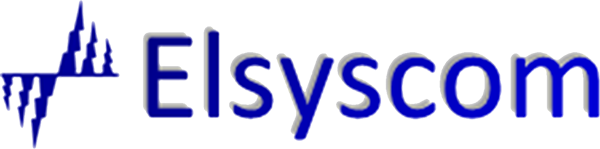
Logo of Elsyscom GmbH

Just prior, in September 2019, a new investor, CESTRON International GmbH, acquired AM Broadcast together with Ampegon Antenna Systems (formerly Thales Group, which produced the ALLISS-Antennas) and created a new company, Elsyscom GmbH at Teltow near Berlin. The old TRANSRADIO Sendersysteme Berlin merged with the well known AMPEGON Antenna Systems, becoming Elsyscom GmbH, a manufacturer of modern transmitters.

== Engagement in DRM ==
TRANSRADIO SenderSysteme Berlin AG was a promoter and supporter of digitizing AM transmitters to DRM. Nearly all greater medium- and longwave transmitters were equipped with their "TRAM"-models. Operation mode of these transmitters could broadcast either AM or DRM. However, Deutschlandradio's AM transmitters were switched off services in 2014/2015 and other broadcasters decided to end short and medium wave transmissions.
The intermediate owner AMPEGON AG was a founder of the DRM standard and a leading force in the DRM consortium which set DRM standards. After the acquisition of TRAM transmitters from TRANSRADIO, it seemed that AMPEGON would offer DRM capable radio transmitters produced by the company itself. In fact since 2012 there existed considerations to sell off the business concerning short- and mediumwave- transmitters. Only some issues with unfinished projects prevented to decide for long.
