= RIZ (company) =

Logo

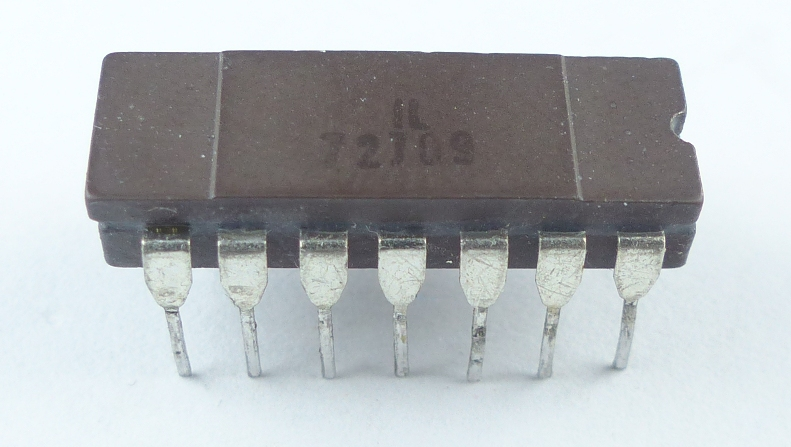
Integrated circuit IL72709, manufactured by RIZ

RIZ is a Croatian electronics company headquartered in Zagreb. It was founded in 1948 as Radio Industrija Zagreb. It began manufacturing radios, gramophones, television sets, semiconductors (transistors, integrated circuits, capacitors) as well as military transmission devices. Currently, it only manufactures transmitters, antennas and electronic electricity meters. They manufactured the first TV in Yugoslavia, TV 101, from a licence by Philips in 1955.

== History ==
The company was founded on 24 December 1948 by a team of experts from Radio Zagreb (today Croatian Radio) under a state decree for the purpose of manufacturing and servicing transmitters for the provider. It was originally a partner of a state institution called 'Composite Organisation of Associated Labour' with about 50 employees. A year after its founding, they produced their first 15 kW mid-wave transmitter called 'Učka', which began mass production in 1952. Shortly after that, they branched out in producing audio equipment, grammophones (RIZ ELAK factory in Đurđevac), radio and TV devices.

By 1979, the company grew to more than 4000 employees and five divisions: RIZ Electronics, Television and Acoustics, RIZ Professional Electronics, RIZ Transmitter Factory, RIZ Industrial Electronics and RIZ Production, Research and Development of Parts and Components. During this time, the company developed and produced a wide range of components and products for various applications in radio broadcasting, industrial electronics, telecommunications, factory automation, railway signalling, radio and TV sets, including military equipment.

It exported its first high-voltage transmitters to Africa and the Arab world, and in 1969 produced transmitters for the Bayerischer Rundfunk in Munich as well as India, becoming a significant global player in major high power transmitter projects and the second largest European transmitter manufacturer. It secured partnerships with other companies such as General Electric, Rockwell, Philips and Siemens.

During the 70s, it began manufacturing equipment for mobile radio and communications systems, where it acquired significant expertise over the following years. It became the first company to produce high-power AM transmitter systems with carrier power up to 300 kW, and secured an order from the US government in 1998.

Following the dissolution of Yugoslavia during the 90s, the company went into a gradual decline, with only some former divisions continuing operation as separate companies under an identical name.

== Recent developments ==
=== RIZ-Transmitters ===
The company's transmitters are described as using spacious cabinets for high-voltage assemblies, secured additionally by stainless steel and Allen screws.

RIZ's transmitters are notably used, among others, by the BBC, South Korean Government and national broadcaster Korean Broadcasting System, as well as the US army. Most recently, it also exported them to customers in Saudi Arabia, Japan and Taiwan.

A joint-venture with the Ethiopian government for the construction of a factory producing electricity meters was planned but was scrapped as late as 2014.

=== RIZ-PE ===
In 2018, in collaboration with company Impel Group d.o.o. and other domestic producers, RIZ developed an advanced military tactical radio called TAKRAD. The device is based on a software-defined principle, possessing wireless ad hoc network and PASS capabilities. Soldiers of the Croatian army began using TAKRAD by 2023, with expected orders being in the thousands.

== See also ==
- List of companies of the Socialist Federal Republic of Yugoslavia
