= Muhammad Saeed al-Sahhaf =

75th Iraqi Minister of Foreign Affairs

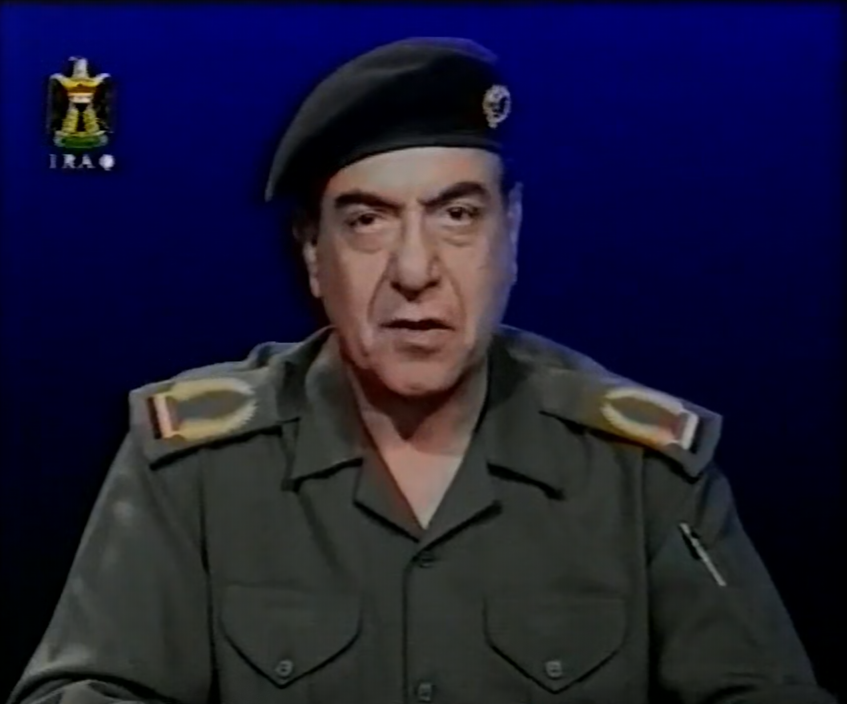
- Al-Sahhaf on state television in March 2003

Minister of Information
- In office 2001 – 9 April 2003
- President: Saddam Hussein
- Preceded by: Humam Abd al-Khaliq Abd al-Ghafur
- Succeeded by: Ministry dissolved

Minister of Foreign Affairs
- In office 6 June 1992 – 23 April 2001
- President: Saddam Hussein
- Preceded by: Tariq Aziz
- Succeeded by: Naji Sabri

Personal details
- Born: Muhammad Saeed al-Sahhaf; 1940 (age 85–86) Hillah, Kingdom of Iraq
- Party: Arab Socialist Ba'ath Party – Iraq Region
- Education: Baghdad University
- Nicknames: Baghdad Bob; Comical Ali

Mohammed Saeed al-Sahhaf (Arabic: محمد سعيد الصحاف; Muḥammad Saʿīd Al-Ṣaḥḥāf; born 1940) is an Iraqi former diplomat and politician. He served as Iraq's minister of foreign affairs from 1992 to 2001 and later became the Iraqi minister of information. Al-Sahhaf came to worldwide prominence during the 2003 invasion of Iraq when he acted as a spokesman for Saddam Hussein's government. He has been nicknamed Baghdad Bob and Comical Ali due to his colorful and blatantly inaccurate media pronouncements.

== Early life, education, and career ==
Al-Sahhaf was born in Hilla, near Karbala, to a Shi'ite Arab family. After studying journalism at Baghdad University, he graduated with a master's degree in English literature. He planned to become an English teacher before joining the Arab Socialist Ba'ath Party in 1963. In the early days of Ba'athist governance, he made regular announcements about recently executed Iraqis on state television.

Al-Sahhaf served as an ambassador to Sweden, Burma, the United Nations and Italy before returning to Iraq to serve as foreign minister in 1992. The reasons for his removal as foreign minister in April 2001 are unclear, but his achievements in the position were often claimed to be less satisfactory than those of his predecessor, Tariq Aziz. At least one report suggests that Uday Hussein, Saddam Hussein's son, was responsible for the removal.

== Minister of information ==
At some point after al-Sahhaf was removed from his post as minister of foreign affairs in 2001, Saddam appointed him as minister of information.

Al-Sahhaf became known for his daily press briefings in Baghdad during the 2003 invasion of Iraq.

At the beginning of the Iraq War, al-Sahhaf said about American troops: "Our initial assessment is that they will all die". On one occasion, he spoke of the disastrous outcomes of previous foreign attempts to invade Iraq, citing an unspecified Western history book and inviting the journalists present to come to his home to read it.

According to CNN, al-Sahhaf described American and British leaders as "an international gang of criminal bastards,' 'blood-sucking bastards,' ignorant imperialists, losers and fools". He also called the U.S. and British forces "flocks of sheep doomed to die in Iraq" and compared them to "a snake slithering through the desert that will be chopped into pieces".

Al-Sahhaf frequently used the word ‘ulūj (علوج), an obscure and particularly insulting term for infidels, to describe the American forces in Iraq. There was debate in the Arabic-language media about the exact meaning of the word; most observers concluded that it meant "bloodsucking insect". In an August 2003 interview on Abu Dhabi TV, al-Sahhaf said ‘ulūj was an archaic term attributed to Umar ibn al-Khattāb.

Al-Sahhaf once said, "Baghdad is safe. The battle is still going on. Their infidels are committing suicide by the hundreds on the gates of Baghdad. Don't believe those liars". As he said those words, Iraqi soldiers were running for cover nearby. As American troops surrounded Baghdad, he said, "There are no American infidels in Baghdad. Never!'" Al-Sahhaf also told reporters that "the Americans would find their 'tombs' in Baghdad".

Al-Sahhaf's last public appearance as information minister was on 8 April 2003, when he said that the Americans "are going to surrender or be burned in their tanks. They will surrender; it is they who will surrender". When asked where he obtained his information, he replied, "Authentic sources—many authentic sources". He added that he "was a professional, doing his job". On 9 April 2003, Baghdad was formally occupied by coalition forces. Al-Sahhaf "kept broadcasting until the last minute while Baghdad was being destroyed around him".

=== Reactions ===
Al-Sahhaf's colorful media appearances caused him to be nicknamed "Baghdad Bob" by commentators in the United States, similar to other propagandists with geographical nicknames such as "Tokyo Rose" and the alliterations "Seoul City Sue" and "Hanoi Hannah". He was nicknamed "Comical Ali" and "Alì il Comico" by commentators in the United Kingdom and Italy respectively – both punning allusions to former Iraqi defence minister Ali Hassan al-Majid, better known by the nickname "Chemical Ali". These nicknames were given because he made statements about the conflict that were wildly at odds with reality. Western media treated him as a laughingstock during the initial stages of the Iraq War.

US intelligence analysts later concluded that al-Sahhaf confidently made false statements about the Iraq War because he genuinely believed what he was saying. Army Col. Steve Boltz, the deputy chief of intelligence for V Corps, theorized that because Saddam's regime was known for frequently punishing those who delivered bad news, military officers would fabricate reports about the battlefield situation. This systemic self-deception within the Iraqi hierarchy led to a surprising lack of awareness when the Americans entered the capital, with some captured Iraqi officers later admitting that they had no idea that the US forces had been so close.

A group of Americans from the state of New York created a website called "We Love the Iraqi Information Minister". The website included soundbites of al-Sahhaf's remarks. It became an "internet phenomenon".

== Post-war life ==
On 25 June 2003, British newspaper Daily Mirror reported that al-Sahhaf had been captured by coalition troops at a roadblock in Baghdad on 23 June. The report was not confirmed by military authorities and was denied by al-Sahhaf's family through Abu Dhabi TV. The next day, al-Sahhaf recorded an interview for Riyadh-based news channel al-Arabiya. He was reportedly paid as much as US$200,000 for the television interview. During the interview, he appeared very withdrawn, in contrast with the bombastic persona he projected during the war. Many of his answers consisted of a simple "yes" or "no". He refused to speculate on the causes of the downfall of the Iraqi government.

Al-Sahhaf's fame quickly evaporated as the war continued into the insurgency phase; from the middle of 2003 onward, he faded from the public spotlight, and was no longer a figure in the war. Al-Sahhaf said that he had surrendered to United States forces, had been interrogated by them, and had been released. He was not charged for his role in Saddam Hussein's government.

In January 2004, The Guardian reported that al-Sahhaf had been hired by Abu Dhabi TV to provide expert commentary on Saddam.

In March 2008, it was reported by The Times that al-Sahhaf was living in the United Arab Emirates.

== See also ==
- Axis Sally
- Hanoi Hannah
- Lord Haw-Haw
- Tokyo Rose
- Moussa Ibrahim
- Sarah Ashton-Cirillo

Government offices
Preceded by Tariq Aziz	Iraqi Foreign Minister; 1992–2001	Succeeded by Naji Sabri
Preceded by Humam Abd al-Khaliq Abd al-Ghafur	Iraqi Information Minister; 2001–2003	Ministry dissolved
