= Iva Toguri D'Aquino =

Japanese-American propagandist (1916–2006)

- 戸栗郁子 アイバ
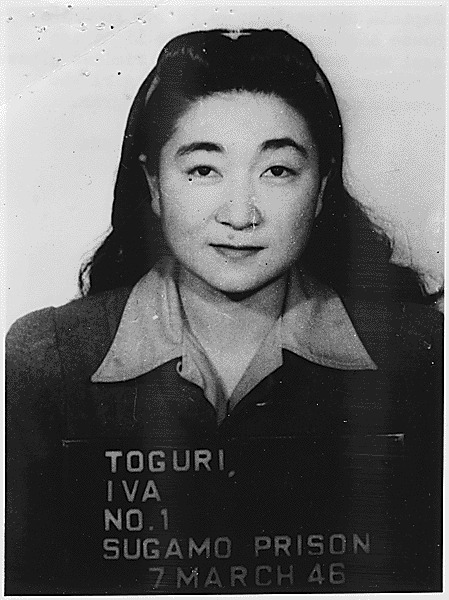
- Mug shot of Toguri in 1946
- Born: Iva Ikuko Toguri; July 4, 1916; Los Angeles, California, U.S.
- Died: September 26, 2006 (aged 90); Chicago, Illinois, U.S.
- Resting place: Montrose Cemetery, Chicago, Illinois
- Other names: Orphan Annie; Tokyo Rose; Ann
- Education: University of California, Los Angeles (BS)
- Occupations: Disc jockey, radio personality, broadcaster, typist, merchant
- Years active: 1943–1945
- Employers: Japanese central government's news agency and Radio Tokyo
- Known for: Participating in English-language radio broadcasts transmitted by Radio Tokyo
- Spouse: Felipe D'Aquino (m. 1945; div. 1980)
- Children: 1

Iva Ikuko Toguri D'Aquino (Japanese: 戸栗郁子 アイバ; July 4, 1916 – September 26, 2006) was an American citizen visiting Japan when World War II began. Unable to return to the United States, she risked her life smuggling food to American service men held in prisoner of war camps.

The Japanese authorities forced Toguri to work as a disc jockey and radio personality on English-language radio broadcasts transmitted by Radio Tokyo to Allied troops in the South Pacific during World War II on the Zero Hour radio show. Toguri refused to broadcast anti-American propaganda, and tried to make a farce of the broadcasts. Toguri called herself "Orphan Annie", but she quickly became inaccurately identified with the name "Tokyo Rose", coined by Allied soldiers and which predated her broadcasts.

After the surrender of Japan, Toguri was detained for one year by the United States military for possible wrongdoing against the U.S. but was released for lack of evidence and U.S. Department of Justice officials agreed that her broadcasts were "innocuous".

However, when Toguri tried to return to the U.S. a popular uproar ensued, prompting the Federal Bureau of Investigation to renew its investigation of her wartime activities. She was subsequently charged by the U.S. Attorney's Office with eight counts of treason, which were based on false testimony forced from witnesses by the prosecutors. Her 1949 trial resulted in a conviction on one count, for which she served more than six years, out of a ten-year sentence in prison.

Journalistic and governmental investigators years later pieced together the history of irregularities with the indictment, trial, and conviction, including confessions from key witnesses that they had perjured themselves at the various stages of their testimonies due to government threats.

Toguri received a full pardon from President Gerald Ford in 1977.

== Early life ==
Toguri was born in Los Angeles, and was a daughter of Japanese immigrants. Her father, Jun Toguri, had come to the U.S. in 1899, and her mother, Fumi, in 1913. Iva was a Girl Scout, and was raised as a Christian. She began grammar schools in Calexico and San Diego before returning with her family to complete her education in Los Angeles, where she attended Compton High School. Toguri graduated from the University of California, Los Angeles, in 1940 with a degree in zoology. She aspired to be a doctor. In 1940, she registered to vote as a Republican.

On July 5, 1941, Toguri sailed for Japan from the San Pedro, Los Angeles, area, to visit extended family and care for an ailing aunt. The U.S. State Department issued her a Certificate of Identification; she did not have a passport. In August, Toguri applied to the U.S. Vice Consul in Japan for a passport, stating she wished to return to her home in the U.S. Her request was forwarded to the State Department, but following the attack on Pearl Harbor (December 7, 1941), the State Department refused to certify her citizenship in 1942. She was stranded and forced to remain in Japan indefinitely, but was unable to read Japanese and "spoke it spottily."

== The Zero Hour ==
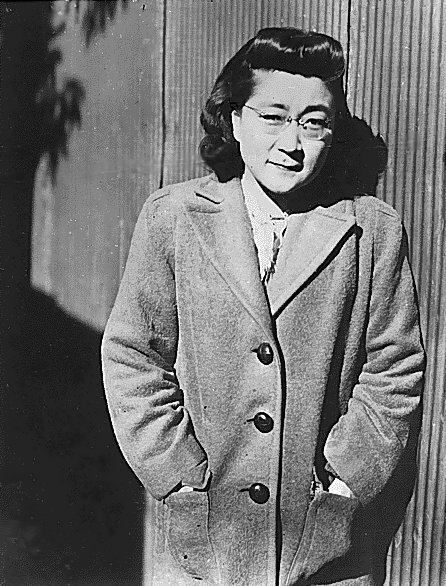
Toguri in December 1944 at Radio Tokyo

Toguri was pressured to renounce her United States citizenship by the Japanese central government with the beginning of American involvement in the Pacific War, like other Americans in Japanese territory. She refused to do so, and was subsequently declared an enemy alien and was refused a war ration card. To support herself, she found work as a typist at a Japanese news agency and eventually worked in a similar capacity for Radio Tokyo. She was also harassed by neighbours and authorities.

In November 1943, Allied prisoners of war were forced to broadcast propaganda, and she was selected to host portions of the one-hour radio show The Zero Hour. Her producer was Australian Army Major Charles Cousens, who had pre-war broadcast experience and had been captured at the Fall of Singapore. Cousens had been coerced to work on radio broadcasts, and worked with assistants U.S. Army Captain Wallace Ince and Philippine Army Lieutenant Normando Ildefonso "Norman" Reyes. Toguri had previously risked her life smuggling food into the nearby prisoner of war camp where Cousens and Ince were held, gaining the inmates' trust. Toguri refused to broadcast anti-American propaganda, but she was assured by Major Cousens and Captain Ince that they would not write scripts having her say anything against the United States. True to their word, no such propaganda was found in her broadcasts. After she went on air in November 1943, she and Cousens tried to make a farce of the broadcasts. Japanese propaganda officials had little feel for their nuance and double entendres.

Film of Iva Toguri D'Aquino and an unidentified announcer recreating propaganda broadcasts

Toguri performed in comedy sketches and introduced recorded music, but never participated in any newscasts, with on-air speaking time of generally about 2–3 minutes. She earned only 150 yen per month, or about $7 (equivalent to $130 in 2025), but she used some of her earnings to feed POWs, smuggling food in as she did before. She aimed most of her comments toward her fellow Americans ("my fellow orphans"), using American slang and playing American music. At no time did Toguri call herself "Tokyo Rose" during the war, and there was no evidence that any other broadcaster had done so. The name was a catch-all used by Allied forces for all of the women who were heard on Japanese propaganda radio and was in general use by the summer of 1943, months prior to Toguri's debut as a broadcast host. Toguri hosted about 340 broadcasts of The Zero Hour under the stage names "Ann" (for "Announcer") and later "Orphan Annie", in reference to the comic strip character Little Orphan Annie.

In April 1945, Toguri married Felipe D'Aquino, a Portuguese citizen of part-Japanese descent she had met at the radio station, and became Iva Toguri D'Aquino.

== Postwar arrest and trial ==
=== Arrest ===
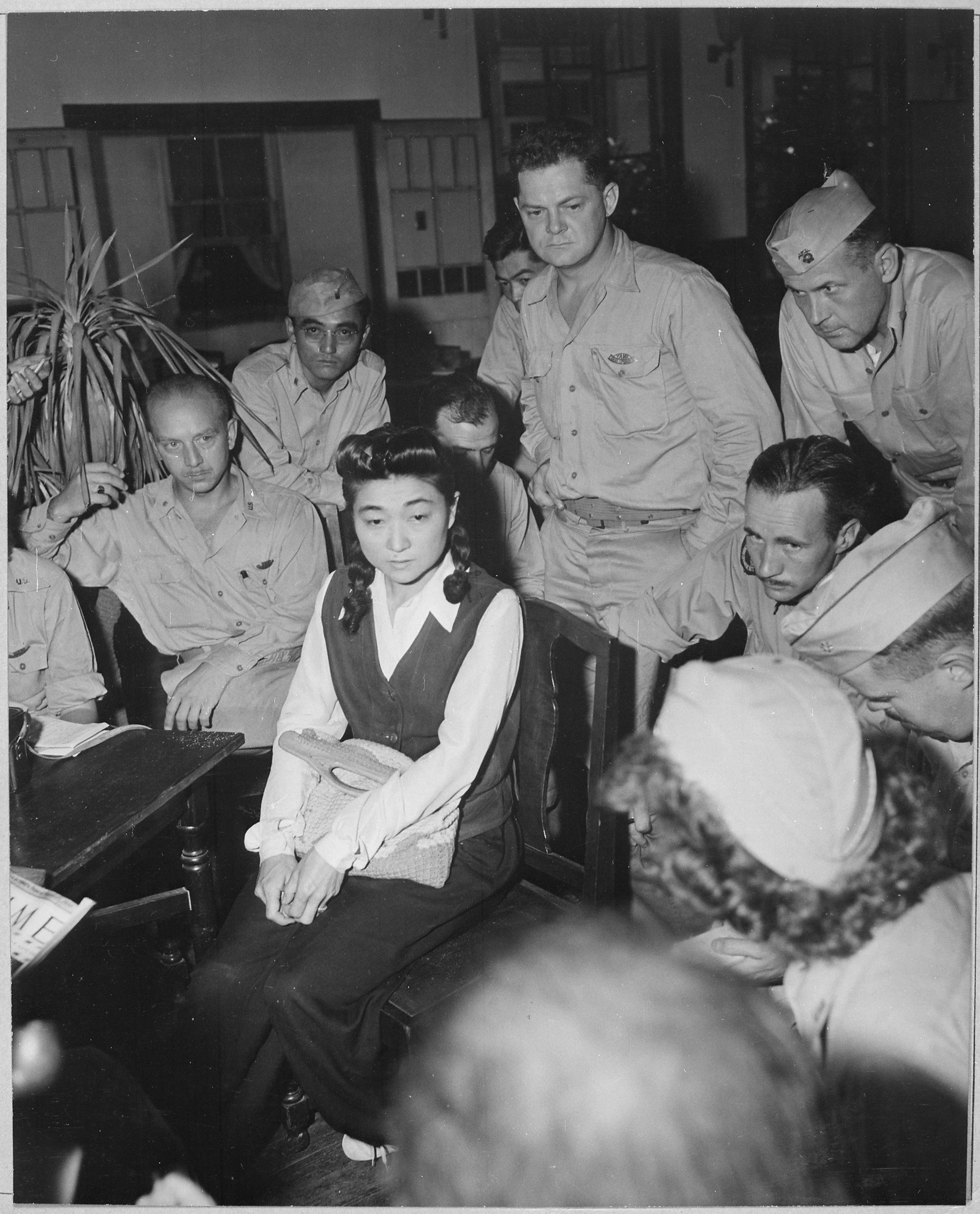
Toguri being interviewed by the press in September 1945

After Japan's surrender (August 15, 1945), reporters Harry T. Brundidge of Cosmopolitan Magazine and Clark Lee of Hearst's International News Service (INS) offered $2,000 (the equivalent of a year's wages in Occupied Japan) for an exclusive interview with "Tokyo Rose".

Toguri was in need of money and was still trying to get home, so she accepted the offer, but instead found herself arrested on September 5, 1945, in Yokohama. Brundidge reneged on the interview payment and tried to sell his transcript of the interview as Toguri's "confession". She was released after a year in prison when neither the FBI nor General Douglas MacArthur's staff found any evidence that she had aided the Japanese Axis forces. The American and Australian prisoners of war who wrote her scripts told her and the Allied headquarters that she had committed no wrongdoing.

The case history at the FBI's website states, "The FBI's investigation of [D'Aquino's] activities had covered a period of some five years. During the course of that investigation, the FBI had interviewed hundreds of former members of the U.S. Armed Forces who had served in the South Pacific during World War II, unearthed forgotten Japanese documents, and turned up recordings of [D'Aquino's] broadcasts." Investigating with the U.S. Army's Counterintelligence Corps, they "conducted an extensive investigation to determine whether [D'Aquino] had committed crimes against the U.S. By the following October, authorities decided that the evidence then known did not merit prosecution, and she was released".

She requested to return to the United States in order to have her child born on American soil, but influential gossip columnist and radio host Walter Winchell lobbied against her. Her baby was born in Japan but died shortly after. Following her child's death, D'Aquino was rearrested by the U.S. military authorities and transported to San Francisco on September 25, 1948.

=== Treason trial ===
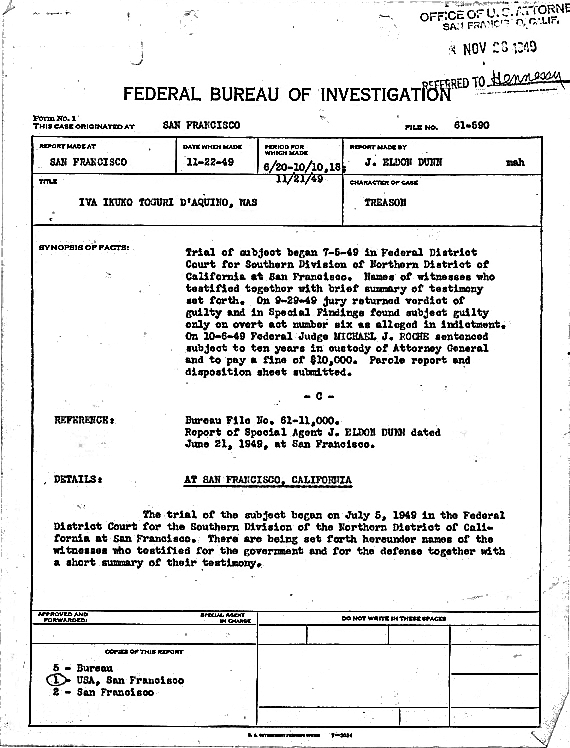
FBI synopsis of trial

D'Aquino was charged by federal prosecutors with the crime of treason for "adhering to, and giving aid and comfort to, the Imperial Government of Japan during World War II"'. Her trial on eight "overt acts" of treason began on July 5, 1949, at the Federal District Court in San Francisco. It was the costliest and longest trial in American history at the time. D'Aquino was defended by a team of attorneys led by Wayne Mortimer Collins, a prominent advocate of Japanese-American rights. Collins enlisted the help of Theodore Tamba, who became one of D'Aquino's closest friends, a relationship which continued until his death in 1973. One of the defense witnesses was Charles Cousens, who himself had been acquitted of treason by Australian authorities in November 1946.

On September 29, 1949, the jury found D'Aquino guilty on a single charge: Count VI, which stated, "That on a day during October, 1944, the exact date being to the Grand Jurors unknown, said defendant, at Tokyo, Japan, in a broadcasting studio of The Broadcasting Corporation of Japan, did speak into a microphone concerning the loss of ships." She was fined $10,000, given a 10-year prison sentence, and stripped of her citizenship, with Toguri's attorney Collins lambasting the verdict as "Guilty without evidence". She was sent to the Federal Reformatory for Women at Alderson, West Virginia. She was paroled after serving six years and two months, released January 28, 1956, and moved to Chicago.

== Presidential pardon ==
The case against D'Aquino was fraught with legal difficulties. Grand jurors had been skeptical of the government's case. Tom DeWolfe, the Special Assistant Attorney General, was "a veteran of radio treason prosecutions" who complained that "it was necessary for me to practically make a fourth of July speech in order to obtain [an] indictment", leading him to urge the Department of Justice to further investigate and so "shore up" the case in Japan. The further work, however, "created new problems for DeWolfe", and soon after D'Aquino was indicted, government witness Hiromu Yagi "admitted that his grand jury testimony was perjured". The FBI's case history notes, "Neither Brundidge [the Cosmopolitan Magazine reporter who tried to sell his transcript of the interview with D'Aquino] nor the [suborned] witness [Hiromu Yagi] testified at trial because of the taint of perjury. Nor was Brundidge prosecuted for subornation of perjury."

In 1976, an investigation by Chicago Tribune reporter Ron Yates discovered that Kenkichi Oki and George Mitsushio, who had given the most damaging testimony at D'Aquino's trial, had perjured themselves. They stated that FBI and U.S. occupation police had coached them for over two months about what they were to say on the stand, and had been threatened with treason trials themselves if they did not cooperate. This was followed up by a Morley Safer report on the television news program 60 Minutes.

US President Gerald Ford granted a full and unconditional pardon to Iva Toguri D'Aquino in 1977 based on these and earlier issues with the indictment, trial, and conviction,—on January 19, his last full day in office. The decision was supported by a unanimous vote in both houses of the California State Legislature, by the national Japanese American Citizens League, and by S. I. Hayakawa, then a United States senator from California. The pardon restored her U.S. citizenship, which had been abrogated as a result of her conviction. It was the first time in United States history that a full and unconditional presidential pardon had been granted in a treason conviction.

== Later life ==
Toguri's grave at Montrose Cemetery

Toguri eventually settled in Chicago where she worked in her family's Japanese marketplace, J. Toguri Merchantile. The store was in operation for 65 years and closed in 2013.

In 1980, she reluctantly divorced Felipe, after he was repeatedly denied admission into the United States.

On January 15, 2006, the World War II Veterans Committee awarded Toguri its annual Edward J. Herlihy Citizenship Award, citing "her indomitable spirit, love of country, and the example of courage she has given her fellow Americans". According to one biographer, Toguri found it the most memorable day of her life.

Toguri died of natural causes in a Chicago hospital on September 26, 2006, at the age of 90. She was buried at Montrose Cemetery.

== Legacy ==
Iva Toguri has been the subject of two movies and five documentaries:

- 1946: Tokyo Rose, film; directed by Lew Landers. Lotus Long played a heavily fictionalized "Tokyo Rose", described on the film's posters as a "seductive Jap traitress"; Byron Barr played the G.I. protagonist who kidnaps the Japanese announcer. Blake Edwards appeared in a supporting part. The film espoused the general public's view of "Tokyo Rose" at the time of Toguri's arrest. The film's character was not referred to by her actual name, but Long was made to look like Toguri.
- 1969: The Story of "Tokyo Rose", CBS-TV and WGN radio documentary written and produced by Bill Kurtis.
- 1976: Tokyo Rose, CBS-TV documentary segment on 60 Minutes by Morley Safer.
- 1995: U.S.A. vs. "Tokyo Rose", self-produced documentary by Antonio A. Montanari Jr., distributed by Cinema Guild.
- 1995: Tokyo Rose: Victim of Propaganda, A&E Biography documentary hosted by Jack Perkins and featuring Toguri, Wayne Collins, Jr., Gerald Ford (archive footage), Bill Kurtis, and others.
- 1999: Tokyo Rose: Victim of Propaganda, History International, produced by Scott Paddor.
- In 2004, actor George Takei announced that he was working on a film titled Tokyo Rose, American Patriot about Toguri's activities during the war.
- 2008: Frank Darabont was slated to direct a new film Tokyo Rose with Darkwoods Productions, which had been planned since 2003.
- On July 20, 2009, History Detectives (Season 7, Episode 705) aired a 20-minute segment entitled Tokyo Rose Recording researched by Gwendolyn Wright tracing the recording of live coverage of Iva Toguri's September 25, 1948, arrival in San Francisco under military escort for trial. The investigation of the origins of this recording documents the involvement of self-serving reporter Harry T. Brundidge and his part in the fraudulent case against her.

== See also ==
- Axis Sally, nickname for female radio personalities who broadcast English-language propaganda on behalf of the European Axis Powers
- Harold Harby, Los Angeles City Council member, 1939–1942, 1943–1957, urged the council to keep Tokyo Rose out of the United States
- List of people pardoned or granted clemency by the president of the United States
