= Hanoi Hannah =

Vietnamese radio personality (1931–2016)

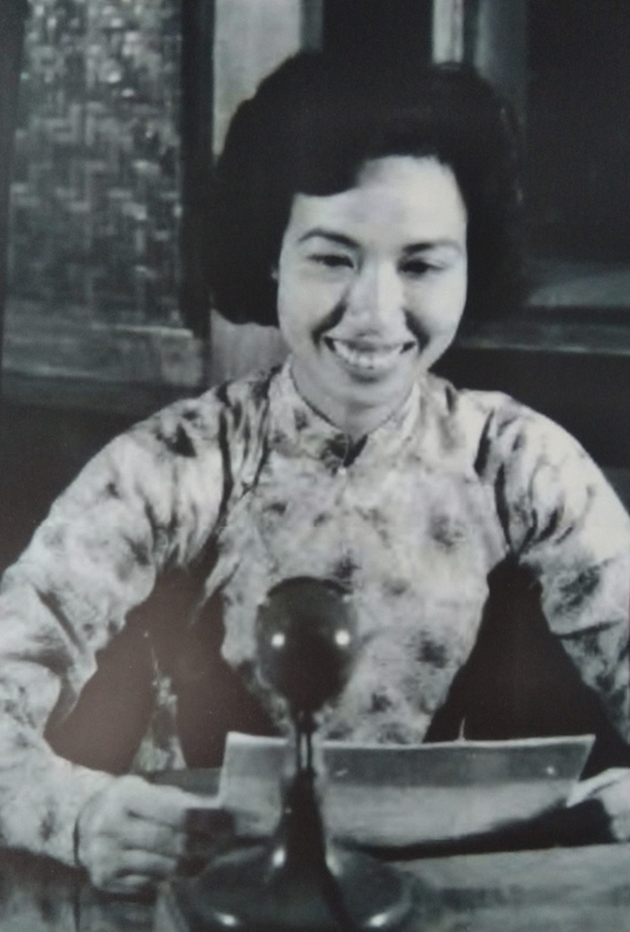
- Ngọ in 1966
- Born: Trịnh Thị Ngọ; 1931; Hanoi, Tonkin, French Indochina
- Died: 30 September 2016 (aged 85); Ho Chi Minh City, Vietnam
- Other names: Hanoi Hannah; Thu Hương
- Occupation: Radio personality
- Employer: Radio Hanoi
- Known for: Broadcasting North Vietnamese messages to US soldiers during the Vietnam War
- Children: 2

Trịnh Thị Ngọ (Vietnamese: [ṯɕïŋ˧ˀ˨ʔ tʰi˧ˀ˨ʔ ŋɔ˧ˀ˨ʔ]; 1931 – 30 September 2016), also known as Thu Hương and Hanoi Hannah, was a Vietnamese radio personality best known for her work during the Vietnam War, when she made English-language broadcasts for North Vietnam directed at United States troops to demoralise them.

== Early life ==
Trịnh Thị Ngọ was born in Hanoi in 1931. Her father, Trịnh Định Kính, was a successful businessman who owned the largest glass factory in French Indochina. She later stated that she grew eager to learn English because of her desire to watch her favorite films such as Gone with the Wind (1939) without subtitles. Her family provided her with private lessons in English. In 1955, when she was 24 years old, she joined the Voice of Vietnam radio station and was chosen to read the English language newscast aimed at listeners in Asia's English-speaking countries. One of her tutors and mentors at the station was Australian journalist Wilfred Burchett. At this time, she adopted the alias Thu Hương, meaning "autumn fragrance", as it was easier and shorter for her non-Vietnamese listeners.

== Career ==
During the Vietnam War, Ngọ became famous among US soldiers for her broadcasts on Radio Hanoi. Ngọ wrote the scripts alongside the People's Army of Vietnam, then translated them into English. They were intended to frighten and shame the soldiers into leaving their posts. She made three broadcasts a day, reading a list of newly killed or imprisoned Americans, and playing popular US anti-war songs in an effort to incite feelings of nostalgia and homesickness, attempting to persuade US GIs that the US involvement in the Vietnam War was unjust and immoral. US Navy ships and personnel were also targeted in her broadcasts, with Ngọ reading out the names of crew members and saying that they were all going to die. She also received and played recorded messages from Americans who were against the war, saying later that she thought these messages were the most effective of all as "Americans will believe their own people rather than the adversary".

A January 1966 Newspaper Enterprise Association article by Tom Tiede described the program:

Hannah's shows are invariably the same. After the news is an editorial denouncing U.S. escalation of the war. Then a recording by an Asian soprano who sounds as if she's having her ears pierced. Then, Mailbag Time ('write us for the truth, friends').

One of her typical broadcasts began as follows:

How are you, GI Joe? It seems to me that most of you are poorly informed about the going of the war, to say nothing about a correct explanation of your presence over here. Nothing is more confused than to be ordered into a war to die or to be maimed for life without the faintest idea of what's going on.

Soldiers were sometimes impressed, when she mentioned the correct location of their unit (when they would "give a toast to her and throw beer cans at the radio"), named US casualties and welcomed Navy ships into port with their correct arrival details and crew members' names. There were exaggerated legends of her omniscience, with rumors that she would give clues about everything from specific future PAVN attacks to soldiers' girlfriends cheating on them at home. In reality, most of her information came from publications such as the US military newspaper, Stars and Stripes.

It has been claimed that US forces in Vietnam distrusted the US Armed Forces Radio bulletins, and listened to Ngọ's bulletins for information from the US. According to war correspondent Don North:

By zapping the truth through an ostrich-like policy of censorship, deletions, and exaggerations U.S. Armed Forces Radio lost the trust of many GIs when they were most isolated and vulnerable to enemy propaganda. It wasn't that Hanoi Hannah always told the truth - she didn't. But she was most effective when she did tell the truth and US Armed Forces Radio was fudging it.

Ngọ's broadcasts ran for a total of eight years, with her final broadcasts airing in 1973, when most of the American forces were leaving. In interviews in later years, she consistently stated that she agreed with the purpose of the scripts and never deviated from them; she believed that the United States should not have sent troops to Vietnam and should have allowed the country to resolve its situation itself.

== Later years ==
In 1975, after the war, Ngọ moved to Ho Chi Minh City with her husband, an electrical engineer. She was offered a job on HTV and continued to do some work for Voice of Vietnam late into her career. She aspired to visit the United States, but was unable to do so because of health issues and advanced age, and stated she held no resentment for Americans. She died in Ho Chi Minh City on 30 September 2016 at the age of 85. Ngọ had two children, including a son who was a painter in the United States.

Ngọ has been referenced extensively in media about the Vietnam War. She was portrayed by Mary Woronov in Chelsea Girls and Veronica Ngo in Da 5 Bloods.

== See also ==
- Baghdad Bob
- Axis Sally
- Eastern Jewel
- Lord Haw-Haw
- Tokyo Rose
- Seoul City Sue
- Sister Mary
