= Tokyo Rose =

World War II Japanese propagandists

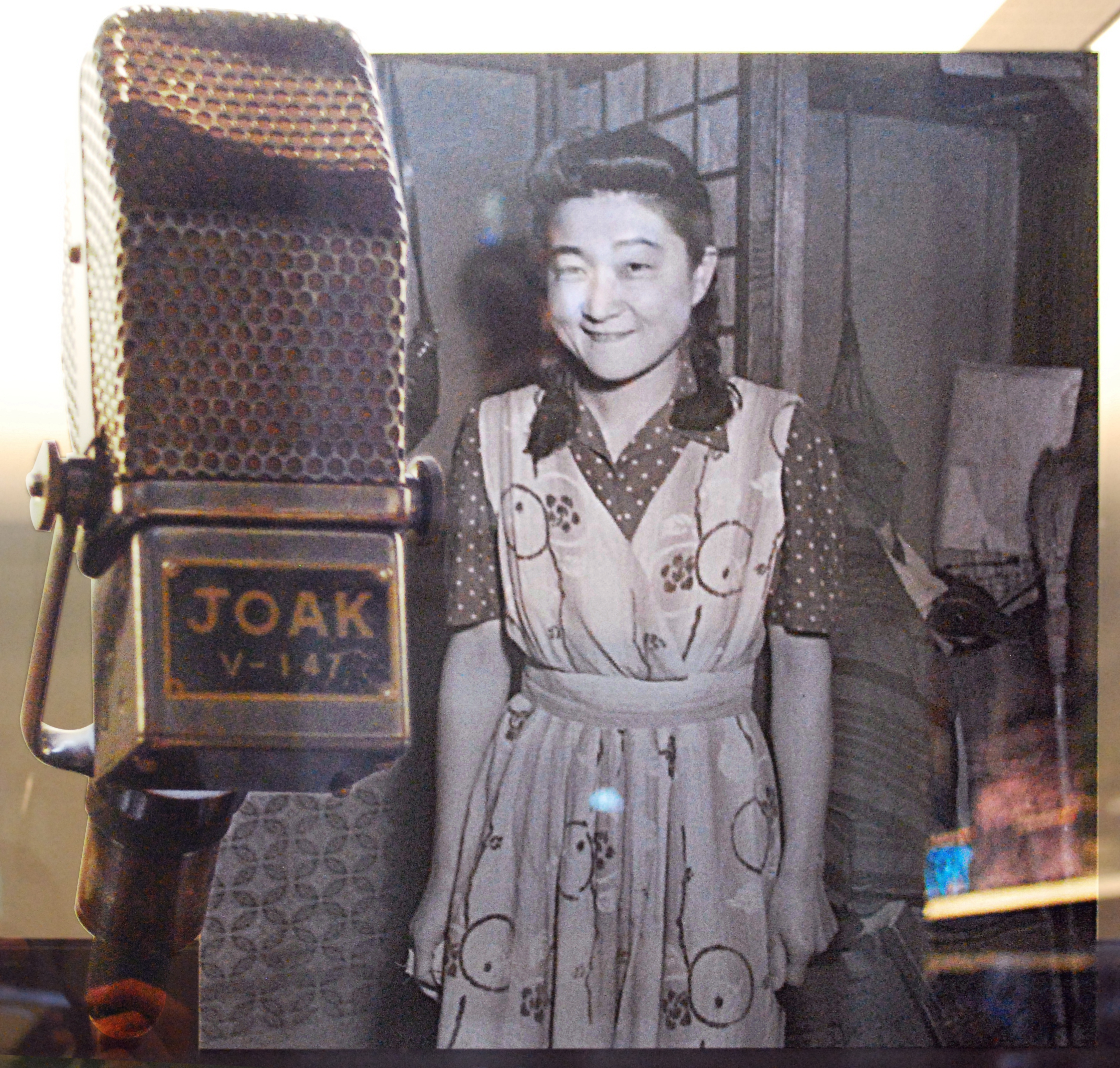
JOAK microphone and Iva Toguri D'Aquino (dubbed "Tokyo Rose" by some), National Museum of American History

Tokyo Rose (alternative spelling Tokio Rose) was a name given by Allied troops in the South Pacific during World War II to all female English-speaking radio broadcasters of Japanese propaganda. The programs were broadcast in the South Pacific and North America to demoralize Allied forces abroad and their families at home by emphasizing troops' wartime difficulties and military losses. Several female broadcasters operated using different aliases and in different cities throughout the territories occupied by the Japanese Empire, including Tokyo, Manila, and Shanghai. The name "Tokyo Rose" was never actually used by any Japanese broadcaster, but it first appeared in U.S. newspapers in the context of these radio programs during 1943.

In the years soon after the war, the character "Tokyo Rose" – whom the Federal Bureau of Investigation (FBI) now avers to be "mythical" – became an important symbol of Japanese villainy for the United States. American cartoons, movies, and propaganda videos between 1945 and 1960 tend to portray her as sexualized, manipulative, and deadly to American interests in the South Pacific, particularly by revealing intelligence of American losses in radio broadcasts. Similar accusations concern the propaganda broadcasts of Lord Haw-Haw and Axis Sally, and in 1949 the San Francisco Chronicle described Tokyo Rose as the "Mata Hari of radio".

Tokyo Rose ceased to be merely a symbol in September 1945 when Iva Toguri D'Aquino, a Japanese-American disc jockey for a propagandist radio program, attempted to return to the United States. Toguri was accused of being the "real" Tokyo Rose, and arrested, tried, and became the seventh person in U.S. history to be convicted of treason. Toguri was eventually paroled from prison in 1956, but it was more than twenty years later that she received an official presidential pardon for her role in the war.

== Iva Toguri and The Zero Hour ==
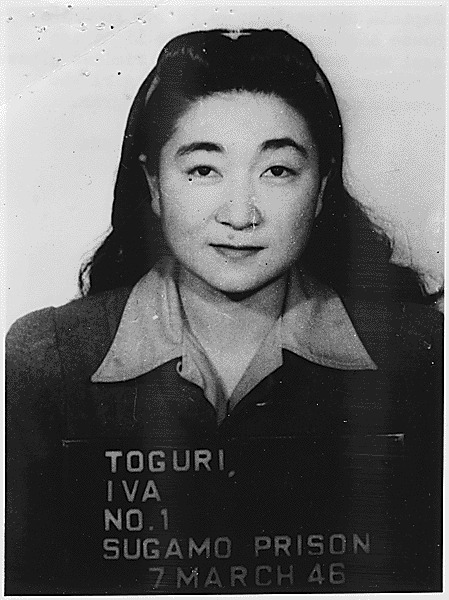

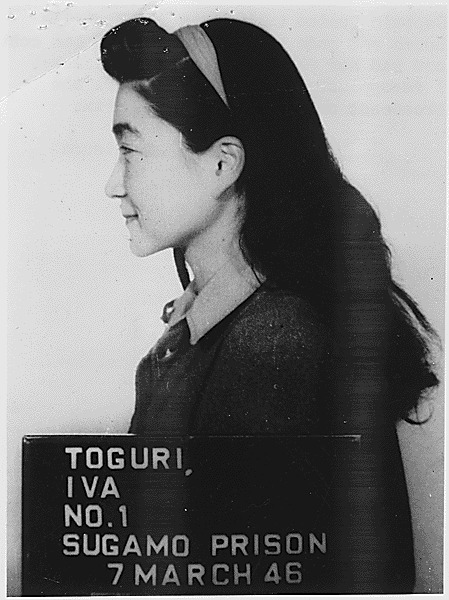
Iva Toguri D'Aquino, mug shot taken at Sugamo Prison on March 7, 1946

Although she broadcast using the name "Orphan Ann", Iva Toguri has been known as "Tokyo Rose" since her return to the United States in 1945. An American citizen and the daughter of Japanese immigrants, Toguri traveled to Japan to tend to a sick aunt just prior to the attack on Pearl Harbor. Unable to leave the country when war began with the United States, unable to stay with her aunt's family as an American citizen, and unable to receive any aid from her parents who were placed in internment camps in Arizona, Toguri eventually accepted a job as a part-time typist at Radio Tokyo (NHK). She was quickly recruited as a broadcaster for the 75-minute propagandist program The Zero Hour, which consisted of skits, news reports, and popular American music.

According to studies conducted during 1968, of the 94 men who were interviewed and who recalled listening to The Zero Hour while serving in the Pacific, 89% recognized it as "propaganda", and less than 10% felt "demoralized" by it. 84% of the men listened because the program had "good entertainment," and one G.I. remarked, "[l]ots of us thought she was on our side all along."

After World War II ended in 1945, the U.S. military detained Toguri for a year before releasing her due to lack of evidence. Department of Justice officials agreed that her broadcasts were "innocuous". But when Toguri tried to return to the United States, an uproar ensued because Walter Winchell (a powerful broadcasting personality) and the American Legion lobbied relentlessly for a trial, prompting the Federal Bureau of Investigation (FBI) to renew its investigation of Toguri's wartime activities. Her 1949 trial resulted in a conviction on one of eight counts of treason.

In 1974, investigative journalists found that important witnesses had asserted that they were forced to lie during testimony. They stated that FBI and US occupation police had coached them for more than two months about what they should say on the stand, and that they had been threatened with treason trials themselves if they did not cooperate. U.S. President Gerald Ford pardoned Toguri in 1977 based on these revelations and earlier issues with the indictment.

== Tokyo Mose ==
Walter Kaner (May 5, 1920 – June 26, 2005) was a journalist and radio personality who broadcast using the name Tokyo Mose during and after World War II. Kaner broadcast on U.S. Army Radio, at first to offer comic rejoinders to the propaganda broadcasts of Tokyo Rose and then as a parody to entertain U.S. troops abroad. In U.S.-occupied Japan, his "Moshi, Moshi Ano-ne" jingle was sung to the tune of "London Bridge is Falling Down" and became so popular with Japanese children and G.I.s that the U.S. military's Stars and Stripes newspaper called it "the Japanese occupation theme song." In 1946, Elsa Maxwell referred to Kaner as "the breath of home to unknown thousands of our young men when they were lonely."

== See also ==
- Lord Haw-Haw – propagandist who broadcast from Nazi Germany during World War II
- Mildred Gillars – propagandist who broadcast from Nazi Germany during World War II
- Rita Zucca – propagandist who broadcast from Fascist Italy during World War II
- Mitsu Yashima – the American propagandist equivalent of Tokyo Rose.
- Agnes Bernelle – or Vicki, the British propagandist equivalent of Tokyo Rose, announcer for broadcasts directed at German navy crews
- Radiostacja Wanda (Südstern Aktion) – Nazi Germany radio station broadcasting propaganda directed at Polish II Corps fighting in the Italian Campaign (World War II)
- Seoul City Sue – propagandist who broadcast from North Korea during the Korean War
- Hanoi Hannah – propagandist who broadcast from North Vietnam during the Vietnam War
- Axis Sally
- Paul Ferdonnet, the Stuttgart traitor
- Philippe Henriot – Vichy collaborator, known as "the French Goebbels" for his eloquent speaking style
- Ezra Pound – American poet, resident in Italy during World War II, from which he made pro-Axis broadcasts. Declared insane after the war, though many believe this was done to spare him a treason trial.
- P. G. Wodehouse – English writer used in German propaganda broadcasts during World War II
- Radio Königsberg

== Bibliography ==
- Duus, Masayo (1979). Tokyo Rose: Orphan of the Pacific. New York: Kodansha International. ISBN 978-0870113543.
- Howe, Russell Warren (1990). The Hunt for 'Tokyo Rose'. New York: Madison Books. ISBN 978-1568330136.
- Ikeda, Norizane. Hinomaru awa: taibei boryaku no hoso monogatari [Hinomaru Hour: A Story of Clandestine Radio Broadcasts Against the United States]: Tokyo: Chuo Koronsha, 1979.
- Ikeda, Norizane. Puropaganda senshi [A History of Propaganda Warfare]. Tokyo: Chuo Koronsha, 1981.
- Kaelin, J. C. Jr. "'Orphan Ann' ('Tokyo Rose')". EarthStation1.com.
- "Iva Toguri [obituary]". The Telegraph. September 28, 2006. Archived from the original on March 11, 2007.
- Tsuneishi, Shigetsugu. Shinri sakusen no kaiso: Dai Toa Senso hiroku [A Memoir of Psychological Warfare: A Secret Record of the Greater East Asia War]. Tokyo: Tosen Shuppan, 1978.
