= Charles Cousens =

Australian radio broadcaster, television presenter and army officer

Charles Hughes Cousens
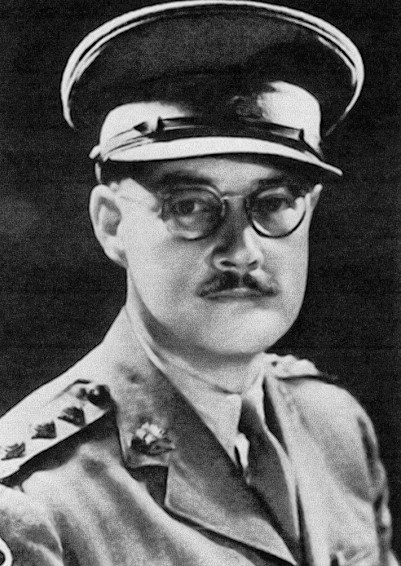
- Charles Cousens, 1940
- Born: 26 August 1903; Poona, India
- Died: 9 May 1964 (aged 60); Sydney, Australia
- Education: Royal Military College Sandhurst
- Occupations: Radio and television presenter
- Known for: Broadcasting propaganda in Japan as a POW
- Television: Seven News, Commonwealth Bank Hour of Music

Charles Hughes Cousens (26 August 1903 - 9 May 1964) was an Australian radio broadcaster, television presenter and army officer.

Cousens was a radio and television personality known for his programs on 2GB and Channel 7 in Sydney.

However, he is best known for broadcasting radio propaganda on Radio Tokyo for the Imperial Japanese Army while he was being held as a prisoner of war during World War II, for which he faced accusations of high treason.

In 1946, Cousens was charged under the Treason Act 1351 - the first Australian to face the charge. Despite being committed for trial in August 1946, the charge was dropped in December 1946. However, his commission was stripped by military authorities in January 1947.

Cousens always maintained he delivered the propaganda broadcasts because he had been threatened by the Japanese with torture and death. Despite this, his work during the war has continued to be the subject of much discussion and speculation.

== Early life ==
Cousens was born in Poona, India. He attended school in England where he was educated at Wellington College in Crowthorne. After attending the Royal Military College at Sandhurst, he was commissioned in 1924.

His first posting was to the 2nd battalion, Sherwood Foresters, in India where he served on the North-West Frontier Province. He resigned his commission in 1927 and relocated to Sydney, Australia.

== Life in Australia ==
After arriving in Australia, Cousens looked for work and found a job as a wharfie while also earning some money as an amateur boxer. His media career began when he commenced working in newspaper advertising.

After reading some advertising copy on the air at Sydney radio station 2GB, he came to the attention of station management who were impressed with the quality of his voice and his easy going personality. At 2GB, he hosted a range of radio shows including the educational program Radio Newspaper of the Air as well as a number of anti-communist broadcasts.

Cousens was part of a special Armistice Day broadcast on 2GB in 1933, one of the station's "soldier announcers" who spoke about their previous war experience.

He continued working at 2GB until 1940, after the start of World War II.

== World War II ==
At the onset of World War II, Cousens was appointed captain in the Second Australian Imperial Force in 1940 and posted to the 2/19th Battalion. He was in Malaya when Japan entered the war in 1941.

After recovering from burns he sustained while demolishing a village, Cousens rejoined his battalion on Singapore Island. His commanding officer commended his leadership and Cousens was promoted to temporary major in February 1942.

Soon after, Cousens was captured as a prisoner of war during the Fall of Singapore and was imprisoned in Changi Prison. Following the AIF inadvertently revealing to the Japanese that Cousens was a radio announcer, he was transported to Japan from a prison camp in Burma. In Japan, Cousens wrote propaganda scripts for the Japanese and delivered shortwave radio broadcasts for Radio Tokyo while also coaching English-speaking Japanese announcers.

He also worked on the propaganda program The Zero Hour where he chose Iva Toguri, an American woman with Japanese heritage, who he reportedly colluded with to undermine the broadcasts.

Following military investigations, Australian federal minister for information Senator Bill Ashley confirmed that the voice heard on Radio Tokyo broadcasts had been identified as belonging to Charles Cousens and that the broadcasts were live. Cousens' wife Winifred Cousens said that she was disheartened to hear her husband talk against the British.

2GB station manager Harold Gordon Horner said he agreed that the voice sounded like Cousens but described it as being "lifeless", stating: "If it is Cousens, he is clearly letting us know that he is being compelled to say these things."

After receiving a letter from her husband in July 1945, Winifred Cousens again reiterated that Cousens was not making the broadcasts willingly. In the letter, Cousens described the morale of the Australian prisoners as "wonderful" and that Australia could be proud of them.

== Prosecution ==
After the Japanese surrendered, Cousens's arrest was ordered by General Douglas MacArthur and he was brought back to Australia on a British aircraft carrier. In November 1945, the Australian Army transported him from Brisbane to Sydney while attempting to keep his arrival secret. After his arrival in Sydney, his wife complained of not being permitted to see him despite being told that she would be able to, stating: "My husband sent me a telegram telling me he expected to arrive on Wednesday and that he would telephone me as soon as he was here. I was not prepared for his arrival a day earlier. It is terrible, after five years, to know he is here and not to see him. His six-year-old son Robert had also been counting on him to arrive on Wednesday."

After his arrival in Sydney, Cousens was admitted to the Yaralla Military Hospital, while placed under close arrest, to undergo routine treatment as a recovered prisoner of war. It was discovered that he had developed a heart condition due to starvation. He was subsequently placed under open arrest and was allowed to visit his wife's family at Mosman.

In May 1946, Cousens' case was referred to New South Wales Minister for Justice Reg Downing after it had been considered by the Commonwealth Crown Law Department.

He was then charged with high treason in New South Wales under the Treason Act 1351.

A magistrates inquiry commenced on 20 August 1946 at the Central Police Court. He was committed to stand trial. However, the New South Wales attorney-general Clarrie Martin dropped the charge in November 1946. Speaking afterwards, Cousens expressed his happiness at the decision and thanked people for their kindness. He also credited 2GB for the support the station had shown him, stating: "2GB have been extraordinarily good to me and I have been given to understand that my job is still there for me. If all goes well, I shall be happy to go back and pick up the threads again."

Legal and military authorities had intended to court martial Cousens but instead they waited until after the magistrate's inquiry to strip him of his commission in January 1947.

According to an army spokesman, at the cancellation of his commission Cousens reverted to being a civilian and was no longer entitled to refer to himself by his former rank as he was now considered "plain Mr. Cousens". However, if he desired, could refer to himself as "ex-Major Cousens".

Cousens consistently maintained that he made the propaganda broadcasts after being threatened by the Japanese with torture and death and said that his radio broadcasts were of minimal use to the Japanese as he frequently sabotaged them by subtly inserting information which was useful to the allies. He and Toguri would often ridicule the Japanese with officials not understanding the nuance or double entendres contained within the broadcasts.

In April 1947, the men of the 2nd/19th battalion selected Cousens to lead them in Sydney's Anzac Day parade in the absence of their commanding officer. However, because Cousens had been stripped of his commission, he was not permitted to wear his service ribbons but he defiantly wore a sprig of rosemary as well as a Legion of Ex-Serviceman badge.

In August 1949, he was a defence witness for Toguri before she was sentenced to ten years jail after a jury found her guilty of one charge of making treasonable broadcasts to American troops.

In June 1950, Cousens denied allegations made by Japanese army major Hiroshi Itsui during the war crimes trials that Cousens had been the guest of honour at a farewell party after eight Australians were executed.

== Later career ==
He returned to work at 2GB in February 1947. After his return, Cousens hosted Quality Corner and Reflections in a Wine Glass.

In December 1949, Cousens hosted a Carols by Candlelight event at North Sydney Oval.

In April 1950, Cousens gave evidence before the Federal Conciliation Commissioner to support a claim by the Announcers and Actors' Equity for a new award.

He resigned from 2GB in August 1953 to join a Sydney business firm. He returned to 2GB in 1955 where he hosted Melody on Wheels, Shopping Service and Musical Magazine.

In November 1957, he moved into television and commenced the role as a news presenter at ATN-7.

In 1959, Cousens commenced hosting the Commonwealth Bank Hour of Music. The show also aired on GTV-9 in Melbourne.

Cousens left ATN-7 in April 1960.

== Personal life and death ==
He married advertising representative Dorothy May Allen on 20 May 1929 at St John's Anglican Church in Darlinghurst. After having one daughter together, Cousens divorced Allen and married divorcee Winifred Grace James née Dettman on 23 December 1938 in the registrar-general's office in Sydney with whom he had one son.

At the time of his death, Cousens' stepdaughter (Winifred's daughter from her previous marriage) Judy-Ann Everingham (née James) was a television presenter at ABC TV in Sydney where she hosted Woman's World and anchored special telecasts.

Cousens died on 9 May 1964 after suffering a heart attack. His funeral was held on 12 May 1964 at the Northern Suburbs Crematorium, which followed a memorial service in a chapel at Allan Walsh Pty Ltd in Chatswood.

== See also ==
- Tokyo Rose
