= Montrose Cemetery =

Cemetery in Cook County, Illinois, US

Montrose Cemetery & Crematorium
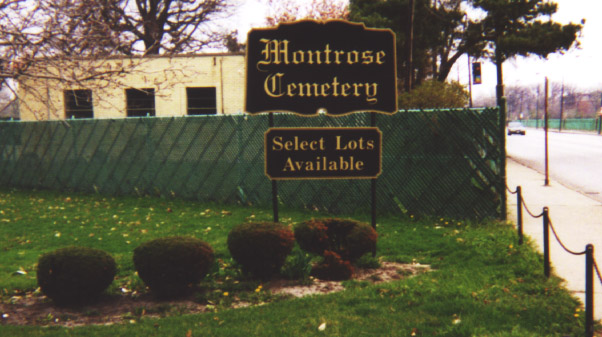
- The front sign of Montrose Cemetery
- Interactive map of Montrose Cemetery & Crematorium

Details
- Established: 1902
- Location: Chicago, Illinois
- Country: United States
- Coordinates: 41°58′51″N 87°43′59″W
- Owned by: Owned and operated by the Kircher family
- Size: 60 acres
- No. of interments: >33,000
- Website: Official website
- Find a Grave: Montrose Cemetery & Crematorium

Montrose Cemetery is an American cemetery located in Cook County, Illinois. The cemetery is located at 5400 North Pulaski Road, in Chicago, and was first opened in 1902. The cemetery has been family-owned since its initial opening.

== History ==
Montrose Cemetery was founded by Andrew Kircher in 1902. At the turn of the century, Kircher had purchased a funeral home in the heart of Chicago's German community, but by 1903, had chosen to enter the funeral business. Kircher bought and developed the cemetery on prairie land, and soon after, entrusted landscaping to O.C. Simonds.

Five years after the 1903 Iroquois Theatre fire, Kircher erected a memorial at Montrose Cemetery to memorialize the tragedy after realizing that none had been built. Out of the 602 casualties of the fire, only one had been buried at Montrose, a little girl. The memorial continues to stand at the cemetery today, and was erected by the Iroquois Memorial Association.

=== Land sale and lost cemetery ===
In the 1990's, the cemetery sold off part of its underused land along its western edge to developers creating the Sauganash Woods subdivision. A portion of the former cemetery land still occupied with grave markers was cut off from the maintained area and has become overgrown, creating what locals call the "Lost Cemetery" or the "LaBaugh Woods Cemetery".

== Multicultural burials ==
As part of Kircher's policy of "Everyone is Welcome", the cemetery has become known for the multicultural background of its buried.

The cemetery is well-known for its memorials to Chicago's Japanese community. In the cemetery, a mausoleum dedicated by the Japanese Mutual Aid Society of Chicago stands as built in 1937 to store urns, and the society currently has more than 300 plots dedicated to the Japanese community. The mausoleum was built in Montrose Cemetery specifically due to rising anti-Japanese sentiment during World War II, and the subsequent increase in Chicago's Japanese population after the closure of internment camps. In 2023, the Consul General of Japan in Chicago, Jun Yanagi, visited the mausoleum and learned about the work that was put into developing it over the years.

Additionally, the cemetery is also well-known for its Assyrian memorials. The cemetery is home to the Assyrian Martyrs Memorial, which commemorates the tragedies of the Assyrian genocide, Simele massacre, and other events in which Assyrians were killed. In 2012, two new granite monuments were erected in the cemetery, which inscribed the names of around 1,000 Assyrian villages that were destroyed by the Ottoman Empire during the Assyrian genocide.

In 2015, former Catholicos-Patriarch of the Assyrian Church of the East, Dinkha IV, died and was buried at the cemetery, with many of Chicago's Assyrian community in attendance.

An area of the cemetery has been dubbed "Gypsy Row" due to many Romani Americans being congregated there. A grave marked with Saint George and the Dragon is particularly well known for the area.

The cemetery serves as a burial site for people of many other cultures, including Koreans, Russians, Serbians, Germans, Hispanics, and Muslims, among others.

== Notable burials ==
- Kathleen Burke (1913–1980), actress
- Iva Toguri D'Aquino (1916–2006), known as Tokyo Rose)
- Bugs Raymond (1882–1912), MLB player
- Herbert Sobel (1912–1987), WWII US Army officer
- Dinkha IV (1935-2015), former patriarch of the Assyrian Church of the East
- Victims of the Eastland Disaster (1915)

== Gallery ==
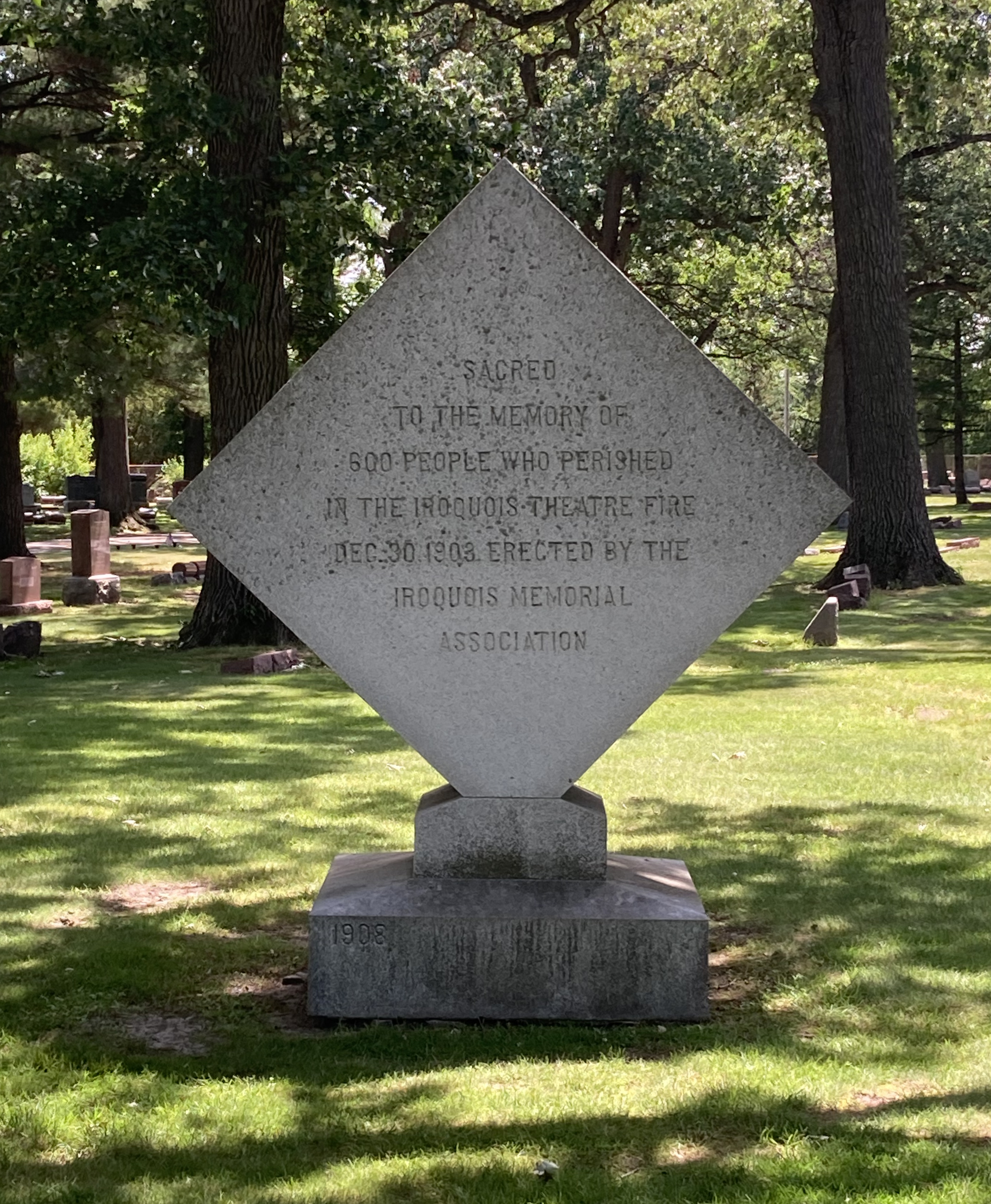
Iroquois Theatre Fire memorial in the cemetery

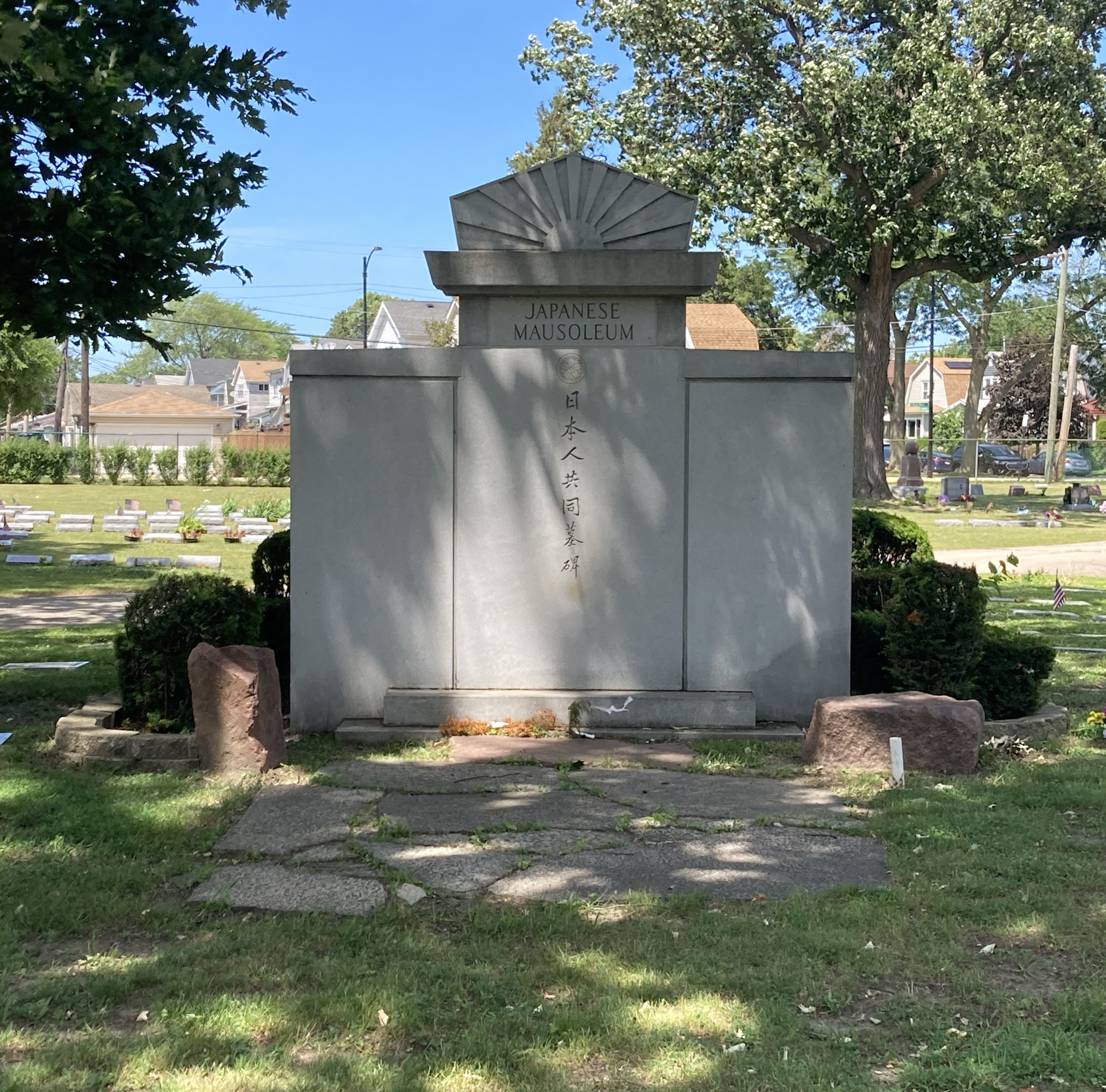
Japanese Mutual Aid Society Mausoleum

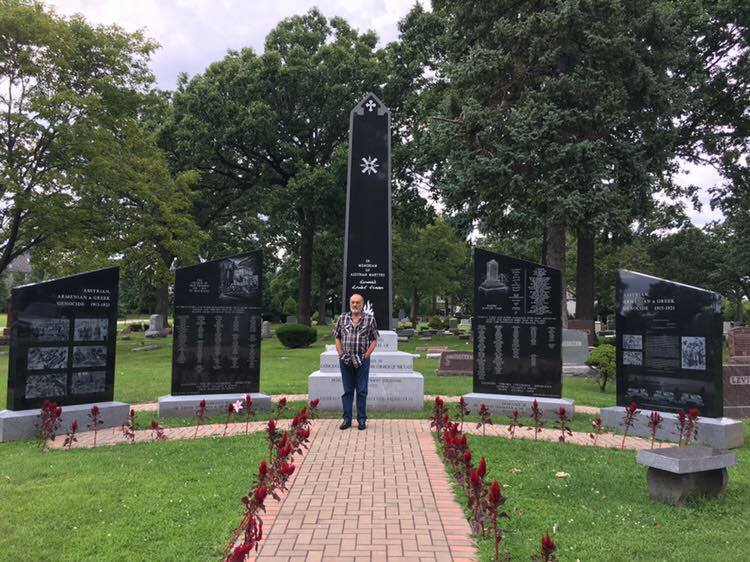
Assyrian Martyrs Memorial
