= Capitulation after the Warsaw Uprising =

Aftermath of the Warsaw Uprising of WWII

The Warsaw Uprising of 1944 was ended through a capitulation agreement which guaranteed not only the rights of the resistance to be treated as prisoners of war but also was designed to guarantee the fair treatment of the civilians living in Warsaw. This agreement, between General Tadeusz Bór-Komorowski and SS General Erich von dem Bach, had taken a long period of on-and-off negotiations to achieve.

== Signing of the capitulation treaty ==
On 3 October, General Tadeusz Bór-Komorowski signed the capitulation of the remaining Polish forces (Warszawski Korpus Armii Krajowej or Home Army Warsaw Corps) in the German headquarters in the presence of General Erich von dem Bach-Zelewski. According to the capitulation treaty, the Home Army soldiers were to be treated in accordance with the Geneva Convention and the civilian population was to be treated humanely.

The next day the Germans began to disarm the Home Army soldiers. Most of them were later sent to POW camps in various parts of Germany. At the same time the civilian population (approximately 700,000) was resettled to concentration camps west of Warsaw. Many soldiers, fearing German atrocities in captivity, chose to blend into the civilian population, escape Warsaw among them and continue the fight later.

== Reasons for failure ==
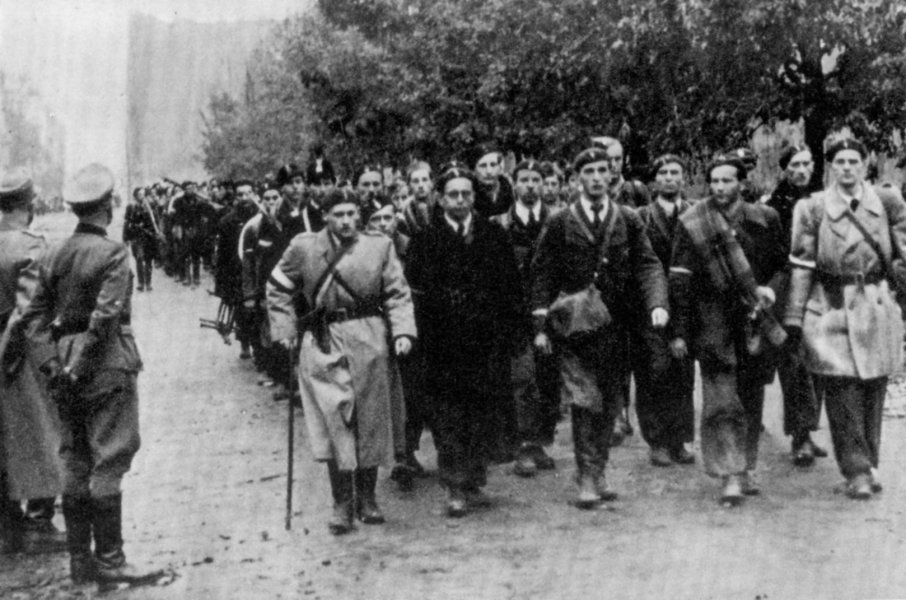
Warsaw Uprising surrender 5 October 1944

There are several factors responsible for the failure of the uprising, although there is no consensus about all of them nor their relative importance.

One of the main reasons for the collapse of the uprising was the lack of support from the Soviet Red Army. Soviet assistance to the Home Army on the eastern territories was limited to small collaboration on a tactical level at best, with common incidents of shooting or imprisoning of Home Army soldiers after the area was seized by Soviets. During the Warsaw Uprising the Red Army stood on the other bank of the Vistula River and only elements from the Polish 1 Armia Wojska Polskiego attempted to make a crossing and received artillery support. The Soviet High Command did not allow pilots from the RAF and the Polish Air-forces to use Soviet landing strips. After the initial radio and leaflet propaganda campaign, the Moscow-backed Wanda radio station remained silent until the very end of fighting. It has been argued that the Soviets deliberately allowed the Germans to defeat the Home Army in order to eliminate a force in Poland which would oppose the communist puppet government the Soviets planned to install in Poland. This is consistent with later Soviet treatment of many Home Army soldiers, who were usually imprisoned, tortured, and executed.

See Operation Tempest for aftermath of other actions of that operation

The decision to begin the Uprising can be viewed more as a political one (a demonstration to show the Soviets and the Western Allies that the Polish government-in-exile had control over the country) than a military one (since the military situation was worsening, as German troops in Warsaw were being strengthened and reinforced). The decision to start the Uprising was rushed several times: first on 20 July, when plans for Operation Tempest were changed to include Warsaw (after the series of reports on aggressive actions by Soviets toward Home Army units in the eastern territories), then on 31 July when exaggerated reports of approaching Russian forces convinced some decision makers that if they did not start the Uprising soon it would be too late to aid the Russians and 'make a stand'. Due to this rushed change of plans, personnel and ammunition available at the time of "W-hour" in Warsaw were not optimal.

== Fate of the Warsaw civilians ==
Most civilians were not killed and many were released into the country west of Warsaw, but some were sent to concentration camps or subjected to slave labour.

The entire civilian population of Warsaw was expelled from the city and sent to a transit camp Durchgangslager 121 in Pruszków. Out of 350,000–550,000 civilians who passed through the camp, 90,000 were sent to labour camps in the Third Reich, 60,000 were shipped to death and concentration camps (including Ravensbrück, Auschwitz, and Mauthausen, among others), while the rest were transported to various locations in the General Government and released.

== Fate of the fighters ==
Most of the resistance fighters were sent to POW camps in various parts of Germany. Depending on where they were sent, the ones that were still alive were later liberated by U.S., British or Soviet forces. Approximately 7,000 jews who fought in the uprising died, including another 7,000 who were captured by various German authorities. A small number of jews hid in the ghetto after liquidation, sometimes fighting with the German authorities.
