= John Ukec Lueth Ukec =

John Ukec Lueth Ukec was born in Aweil, Sudan, which lies in the eastern portion of Southern Sudan. Appointed by the Sudan People's Liberation Army/Movement, he was the Charge d'Affaires or Sudanese ambassador to the United States from 2006-2007. Ukec gained notoriety in the West with a Washington Post article about his downplaying of international claims of genocide in Darfur. In the style of naming Iraqi diplomat Muhammad Saeed al-Sahhaf "Baghdad Bob" for his propaganda interviews, the Post nicknamed Ukec "Khartoum Karl". Joining the Southern Liberation Movement in 1964, he served as a military officer in the Anya-nya Forces until the Addis Ababa Peace Accord in 1972, when he was absorbed into the Sudan Armed Forces with the rank of captain. He concluded his military career as a general and commanding officer of the First Infantry Division's Combat Training Center. Moving to the United States in the 1980s, Ukec became an activist and public speaker on liberation issues of Southern Sudan. He earned master's degrees from both Iowa State University and Oklahoma State University. From 1989 to 2005, he taught economics at Langston University in Oklahoma and at Des Moines Area Community College in Iowa. During this time, he also worked at Iowa State University as a Financial Aid Administrator, Chair of Human Relations, and co-Chair of Black Faculty and Staff. General John left both Iowa State University and Des Moines Area Community College to join the Government of national unity as Sudan's Ambassador to the United States.
