= The Zero Hour (Japanese radio series) =

Japanese World War II radio show with American prisoners of war

The Zero Hour (ゼロ・アワー, Zero awā) was the first of over a dozen live radio programs broadcast by Japan during the Pacific War. To reach a large geographical area these transmissions included shortwave radio frequencies in the 31 m band. The program featured Allied prisoners of war (POW) reading current news and playing prerecorded music, and sending messages from POWs to their families back home and to Allied soldiers and sailors serving in the Pacific theater. These messages were interlaced with demoralizing commentary and appeals to surrender or sabotage the Allied war effort. The Zero Hour also featured the female announcer, Iva Toguri D'Aquino, one of several who were dubbed Tokyo Rose.

The Zero Hour was the brainchild of Major Shigetsugu Tsuneishi, who joined the Japanese Imperial Army's 8th Section G-2 (Psychological Warfare) unit as the Army representative to the Information Liaison Confidential Committee, which oversaw the coordination of the nationalized news agencies, in November 1941. His first effort was a propagandistic photographic magazine called Front, based on the format of the American magazine Life.

Major Tsuneishi established an office at Radio Tokyo (NHK) and issued orders to the NHK Overseas Bureau's American, European, Asian, Editorial and Administration Divisions through Bureau Chief Yoshio Muto. Thereafter, all news broadcasts became official announcements of the Japanese Imperial Army General Headquarters (GHQ). The American Division radio announcers section was headed by the Japanese native Yuichi Hirakawa, who held a degree in Dramatics from the University of Washington.

Tsuneishi acquired a veteran radio announcer with the capture of Australian Army Major Charles Cousens, who had been a popular and highly regarded news commenter in Sydney before the War. During an interrogation at the General Staff HQ in Tokyo on August 1, 1942, Tsuneishi made it clear to Cousens that he had to broadcast for the Japanese or face execution before putting him to work at 6 p.m. that same evening. Cousens was subsequently tasked with writing and broadcasting "radio essays" on the need to have high ideals as a human being, collections of platitudes with no propaganda value.
