= Walter Kaner =

American journalist (1920–2005)

Walter Kaner (May 5, 1920 – June 26, 2005) was an American journalist, radio personality and philanthropist.

He broadcast using the name Tokyo Mose during and after World War II. Kaner broadcast on U.S. Army Radio, at first to offer comic rejoinders to the propaganda broadcasts of Tokyo Rose and then as a parody to entertain U.S. troops abroad. In U.S.-occupied Japan, his "Moshi, Moshi Ano-ne" jingle was sung to the tune of "London Bridge is Falling Down" and became so popular with Japanese children and GIs that the U.S. military’s Stars and Stripes newspaper called it "the Japanese occupation theme song." In 1946, Elsa Maxwell referred to Kaner as "the breath of home to unknown thousands of our young men when they were lonely." Back in the United States he was a stand-in for Ed Sullivan on television. Kaner was a former columnist for the Long Island Press, N.Y. Daily News and Western Queens Gazette. He was also the chairman of the board and founder of the Walter Kaner Children’s Foundation, which was to benefit disadvantaged children. He was married for 50 years to Billie Elliot Kaner until her death on September 29, 2004. Kaner died at his Port Washington, New York home on June 26, 2005.

== See also ==
- Tokyo Rose – female propagandists who broadcast for Japan during World War II.
- Mitsu Yashima – the American equivalent of Tokyo Rose.
