= Radio Hanoi =

Propaganda radio station

Radio Hanoi was a propaganda radio station run by the North Vietnamese Army during the Vietnam War. It originated in 1945, when it broadcast from Hanoi a week after the declaration of the Democratic Republic of Vietnam with the declaration "This is the Voice of Vietnam, broadcasting from Hanoi, the capital of the Democratic Republic of Vietnam.". The station was noted for Hanoi Hannah's propaganda speeches, which were used to undermine American morale, such as when she correctly read out lists of names concerning a ship's arrival. Her broadcasts ran for 8 years, ending when US forces left in 1973. The station was later merged with the NLF's Liberation Radio to become the Voice of Vietnam Station.

In September 1967, Radio Hanoi transmitted a message by General Võ Nguyên Giáp entitled "The Big Victory, The Great Task". Unbeknownst to Americans listening to the message, it was actually an outline to the upcoming Tet Offensive (which occurred on January 30, 1968). In the message, Giap stated: "U.S. Generals are subjective and haughty, and have always been caught by surprise and defeated."
