= Propaganda kimono =

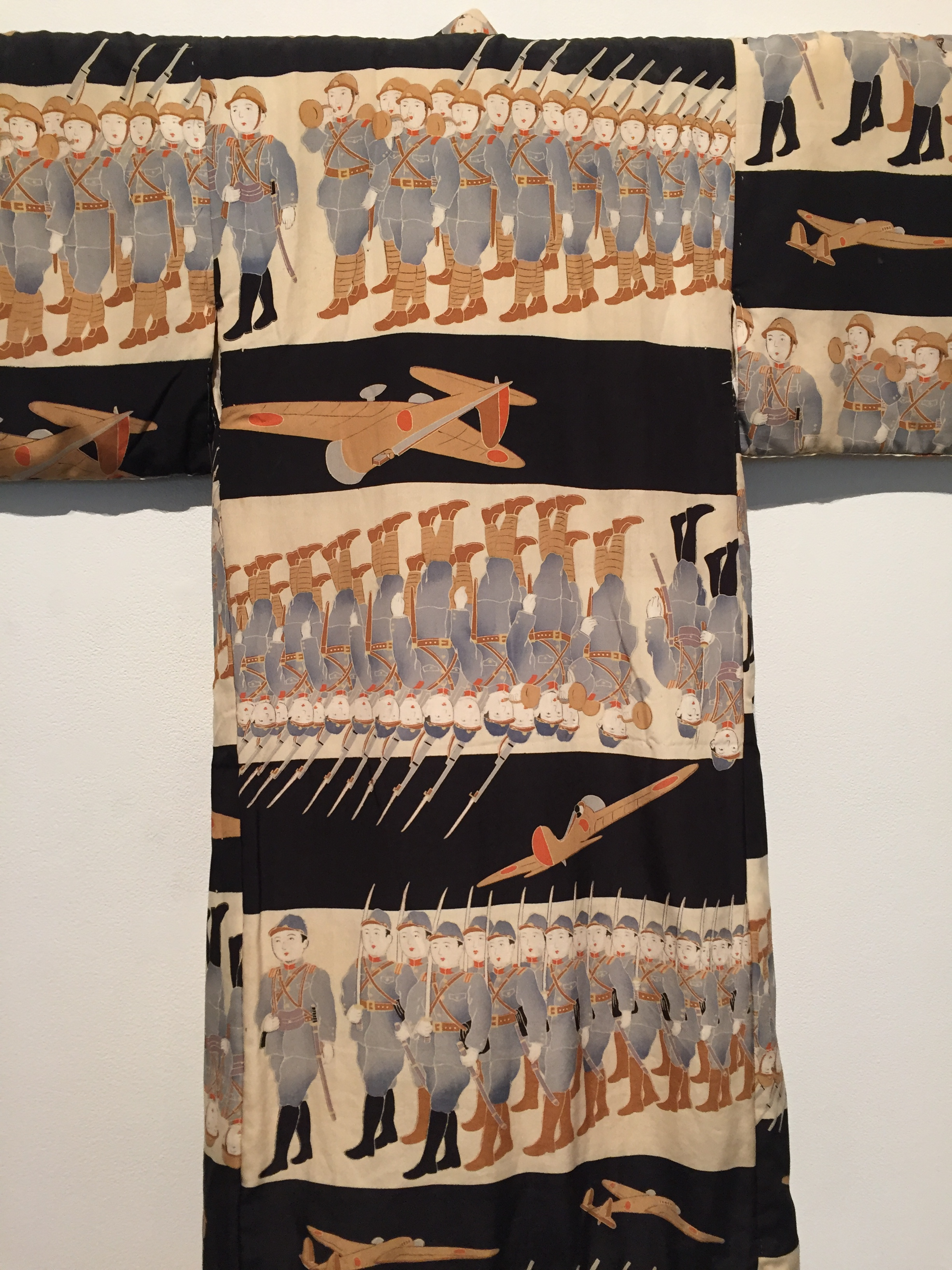
Boy's silk kimono, made in Japan, 1940, showing fighter planes and troops in formation

Kimono that carried designs depicting scenes from contemporary life became popular in the Empire of Japan between 1900 and 1945, during Japan's involvement in WWII. Now referred to as omoshirogara (面白柄, lit. "interesting" or "novelty" designs), the decoration of many kimono produced during this time often depicted the military and political actions of Japan during its involvement in the war on the side of the Axis powers. In English, these kimono are commonly referred to as 'propaganda kimono'. Traditional items of clothing that were not kimono, such as nagajuban (underkimono), haori (jackets worn over kimono) and haura (the decorative inner linings of men's haori) also featured wartime omoshirogara, as did miyamari, the kimono worn by infants when taken to a Shinto shrine to be blessed. Omoshirogara garments were typically worn inside the home or at private parties, during which the host would show them off to small groups of family or friends, and were worn by men, women and children.

== History ==
Among the factors that led to the emergence of propaganda kimono, three stand out: the introduction of modern textile manufacturing and printing equipment into Japan in the late 19th century, the social and political impetus for Japan to modernize, and, following the Japanese invasion of Manchuria in 1931, political desire to rally support for colonial expansion. The introduction of Western textile manufacturing techniques and machinery allowed textile manufacturers to produce printed fabric at a quicker and cheaper rate than traditional dye techniques allowed, and later support from the Japanese population for colonialist expansion would lead into support in WWII against the Allied powers.

Much of the imagery used on propaganda kimono was widely used on other media and consumer goods, such as popular magazines, toys, posters and dolls. Some typical omoshirogara designs from the early 1920s to the mid-1930s focused on the outward signs of modernity, depicting a sleek, Westernized, consumerist future – cityscapes with subways and skyscrapers, ocean liners, steaming locomotives, sleek cars and airplanes. Other designs showed images reflecting current events (e.g., the visit of the Graf Zeppelin in 1929) and social trends, such as depictions of the "modern girl", whose new pastimes were cocktails, nightclubs, and jazz music. Regardless of the subject matter, wartime omoshirogara employed a bold colour palette, showing direct influences from Art Deco, Dadaism and Cubism, as well as social realism and other graphic media.

By the later 1920s, and particularly following the crash of 1929, with Japan's economically disastrous return to the gold standard, conservative and ultra-nationalist forces in the military and government began to push back against the modernist trends in Japanese society, and sought to reassert more traditional values. Military power, the will to use it, and the ability to manufacture its hardware became central to Japan's self-image. As a result, the propaganda kimono designs took on an increasing militaristic air. Wartime animated characters, such as Norakuro, were also frequently appeared in war propaganda kimono textiles.

Only since the late 20th-century have scholars in Japan, Europe and the United States begun to seriously study Japanese propaganda kimono. In 2005, The Bard Graduate Center mounted one of the first major exhibits of these kimono, curated by Jacqueline M. Atkins, an American textile historian and recognized scholar of Japanese 20th century textiles. The exhibition also was shown at the Allentown Art Museum and the Honolulu Academy of Art (2006–2007). The Metropolitan Museum of Art, The Johann Jacobs Museum (Zurich), the Edward Thorp Gallery in New York City, and the Saint Louis Art Museum have mounted exhibits that have included propaganda kimono. The Boston Museum of Fine Arts received a significant donation of wartime and other omoshirogara kimono from an American collector in 2010.

== Gallery ==
Propaganda kimono from the Collection of the Metropolitan Museum of Art, New York

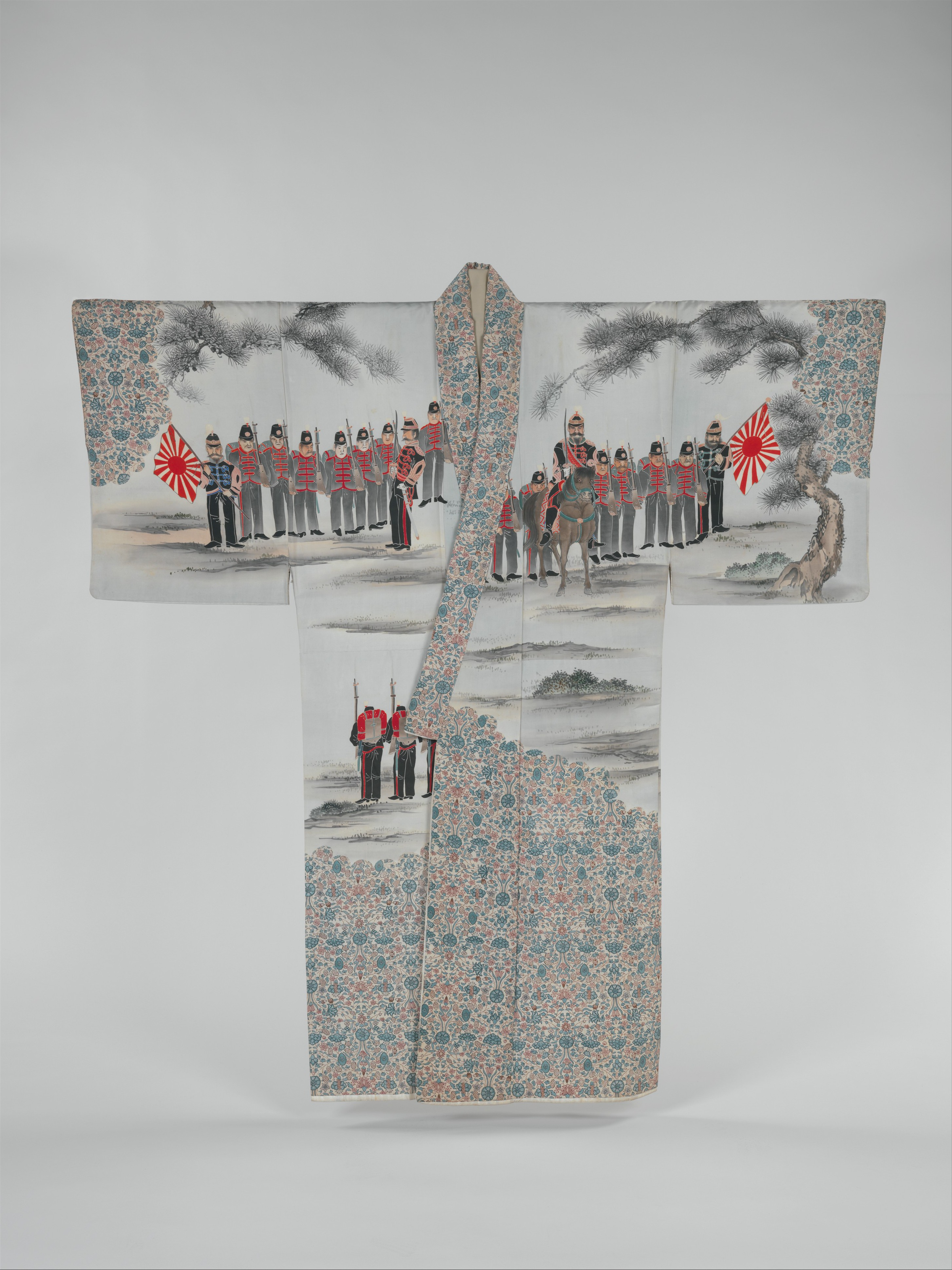
Man's under-kimono (nagajuban) with scene of the Russo-Japanese War

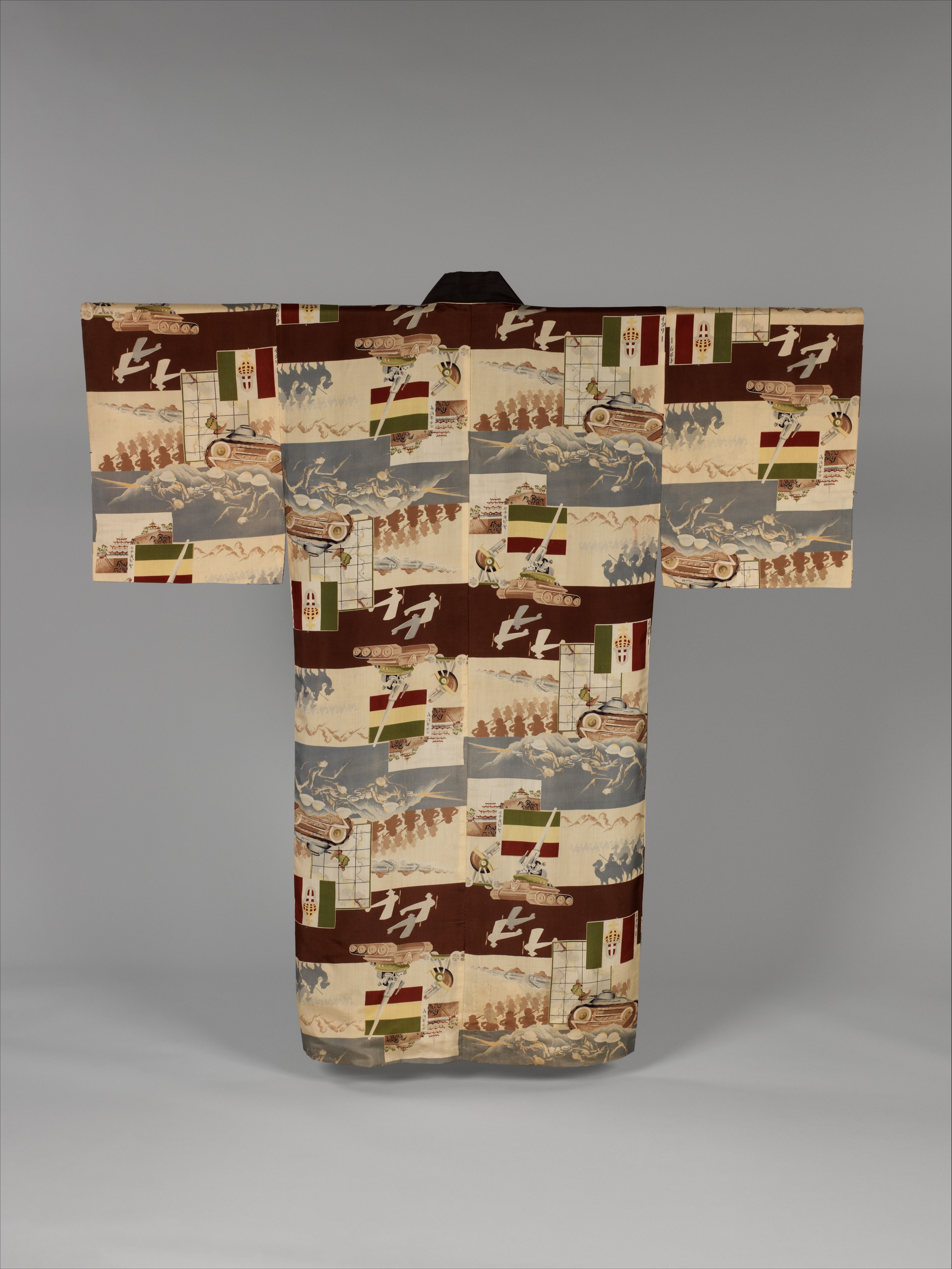
Man's under-kimono (nagajuban) with "Italy in Ethiopia" symbols

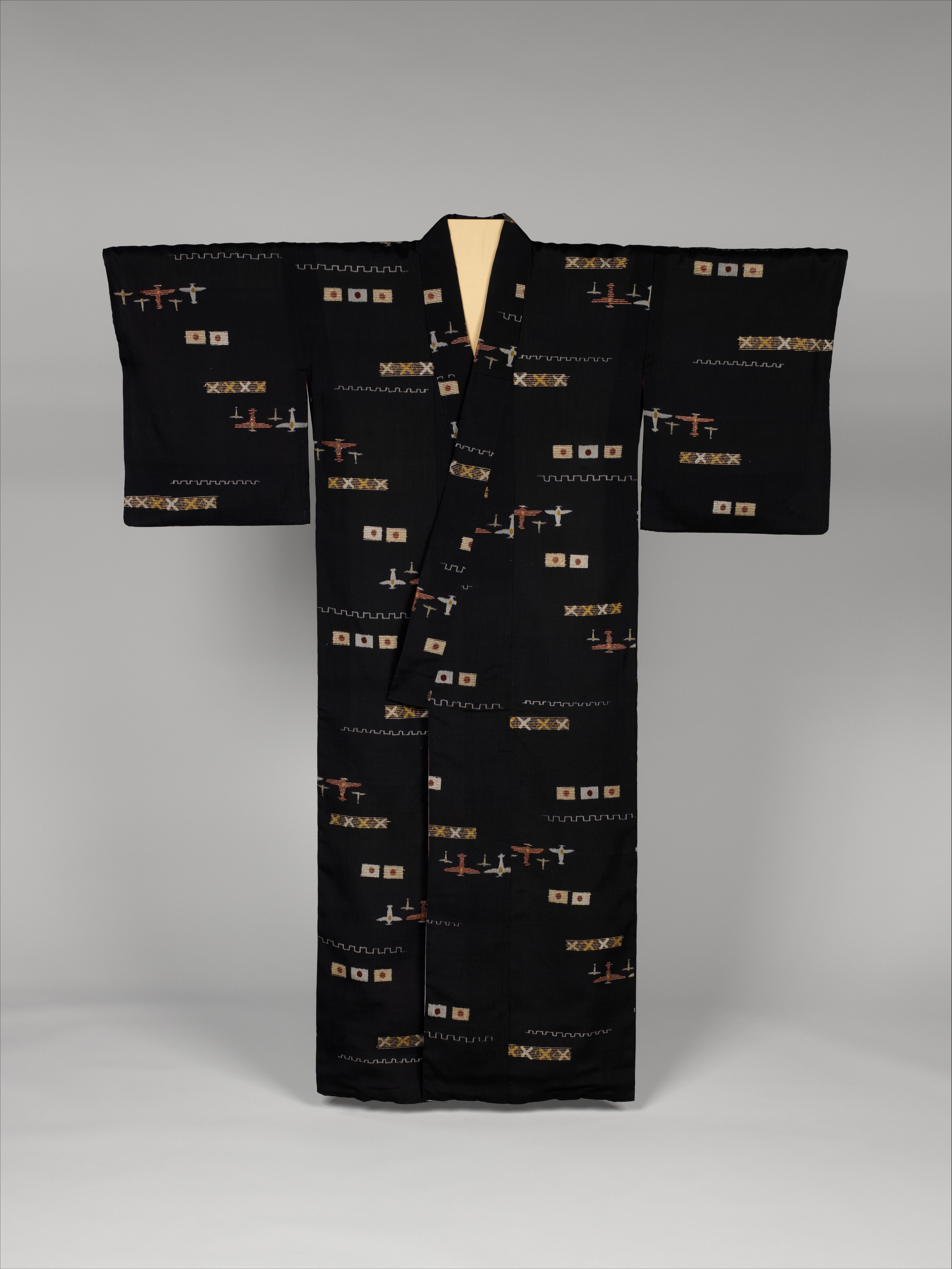
Woman's kimono with planes and hinomaru flags

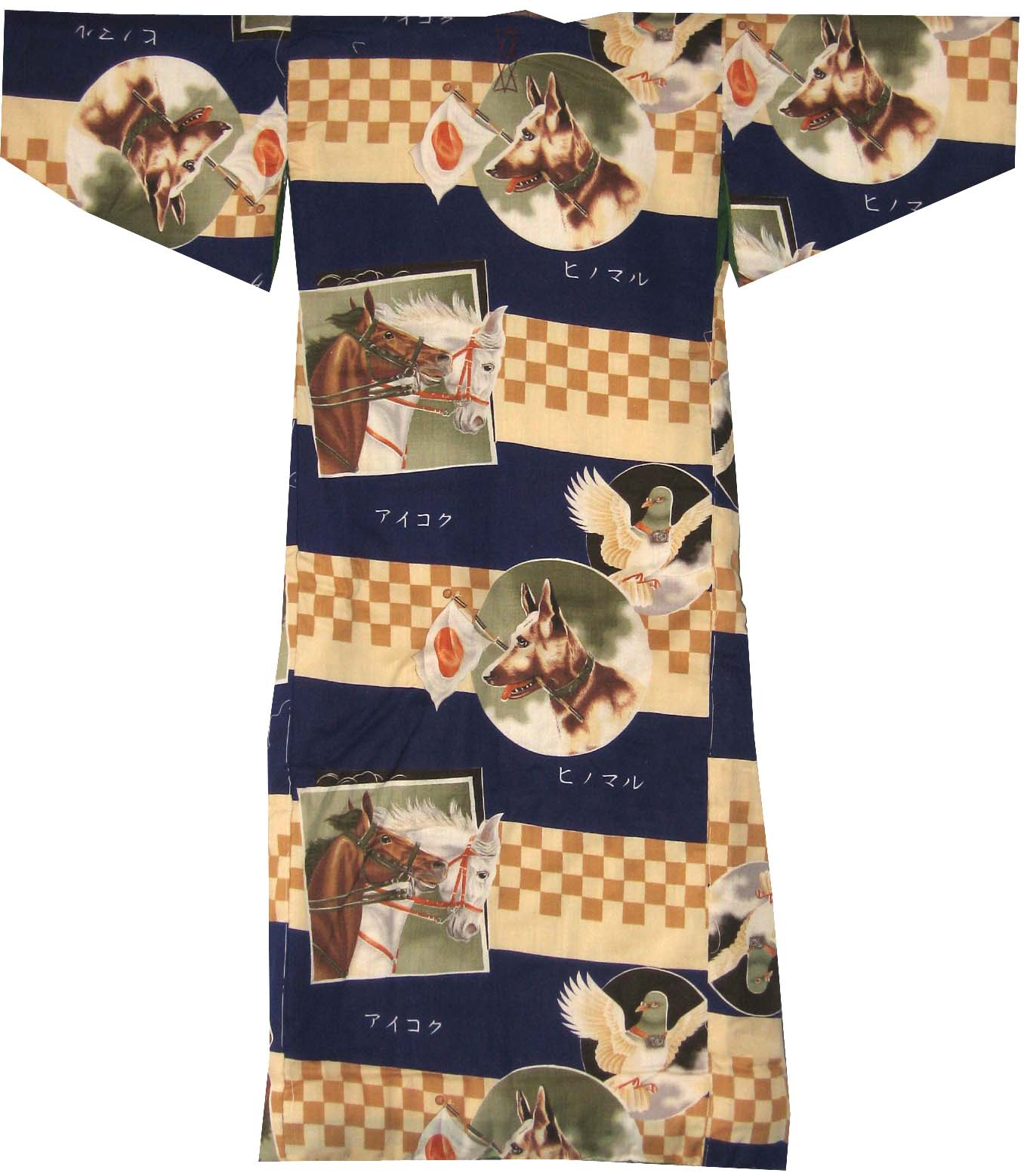
Kimono celebrating the role of animals in the Japanese invasion of Manchuria

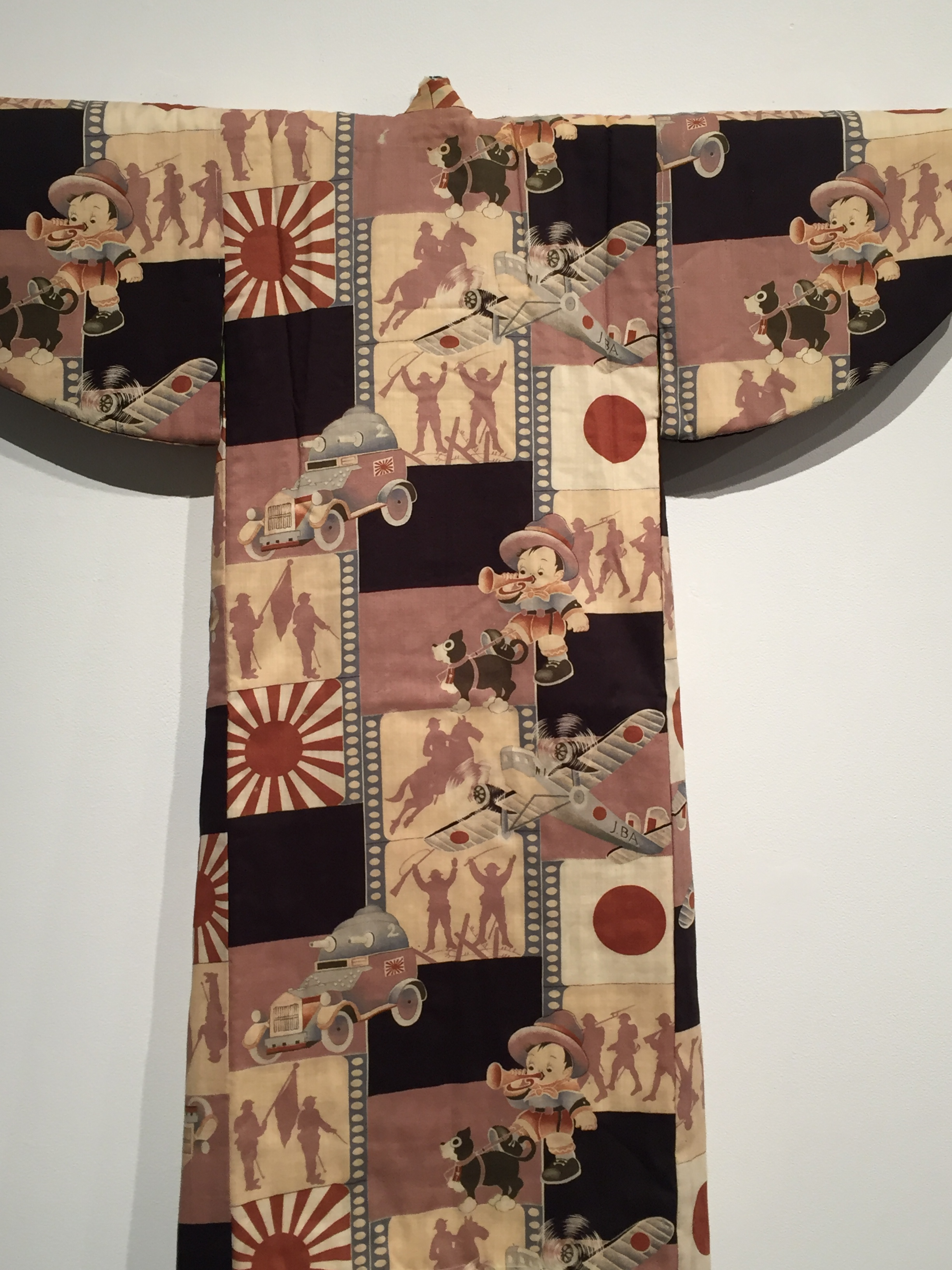
Boy's wool kimono, c. 1933, showing Japanese military action in China. Norakuro, the faithful dog, was a traditional character.

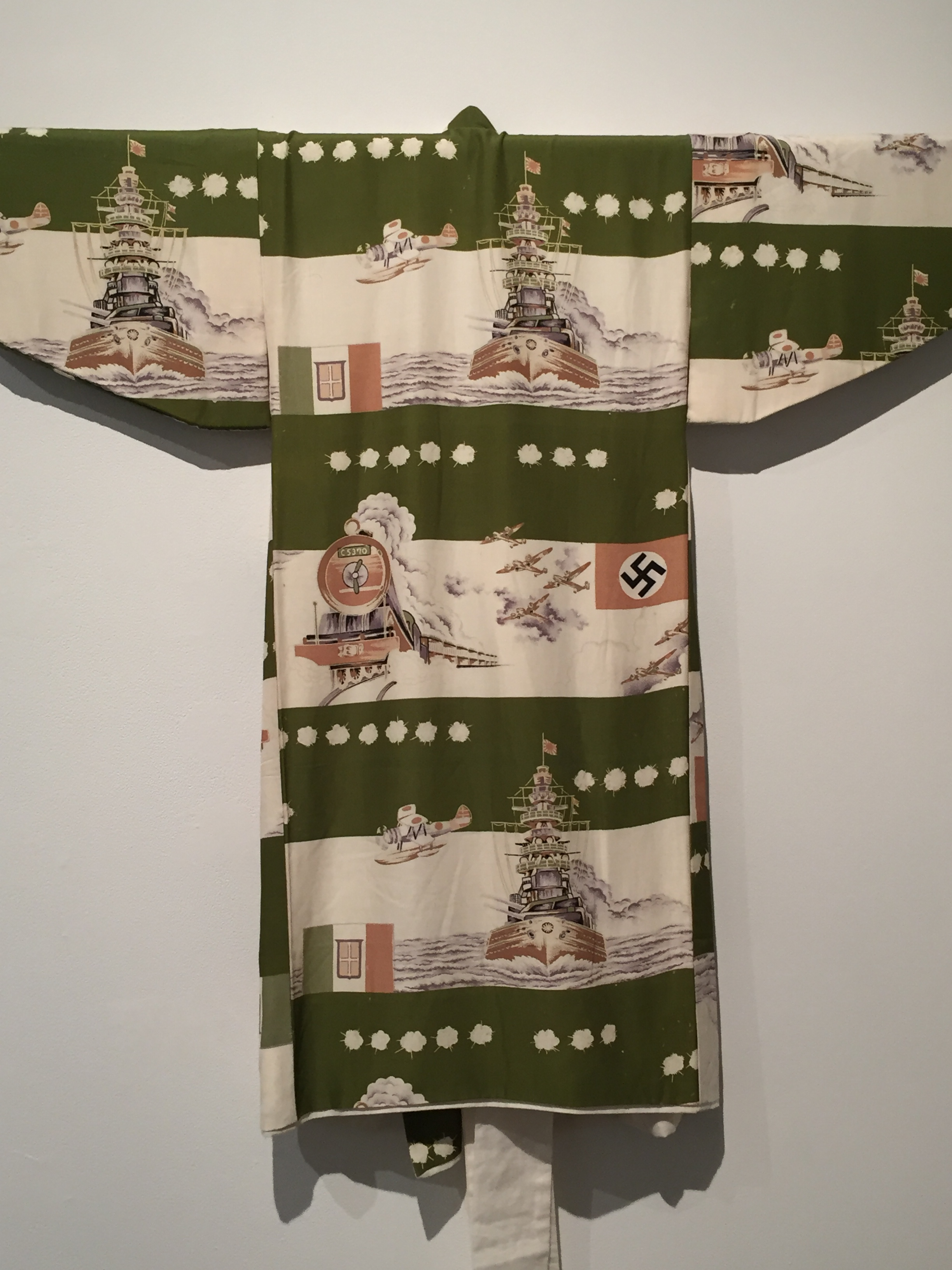
Boy's propaganda kimono c. 1940, showing symbols of the Axis powers
