= Rita Zucca =

World War II propagandist (1912–1998)

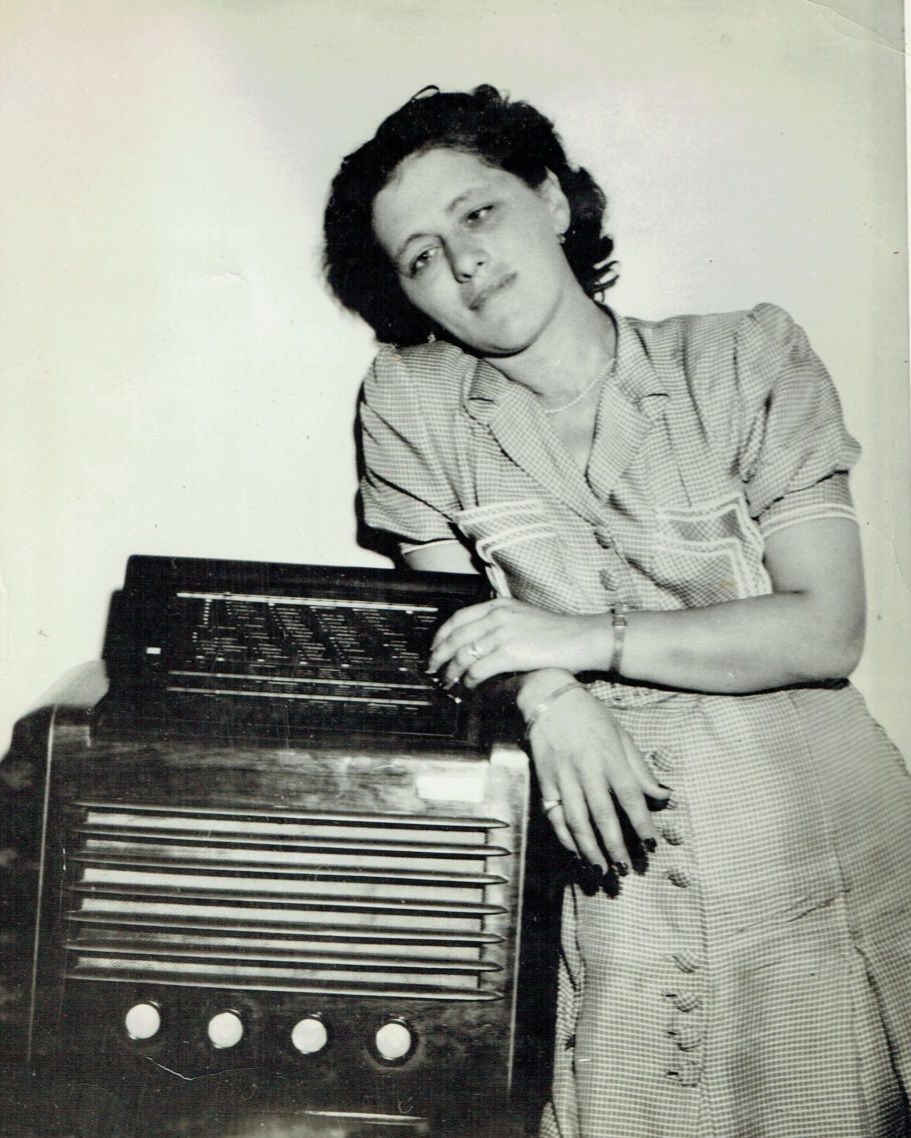
- Born: Rita Luisa Zucca; 1912; New York City, New York, United States
- Died: 1998 (aged 85–86); Italy
- Other name: Axis Sally
- Known for: Broadcasting Axis propaganda in World War II
- Children: 1

Rita Luisa Zucca (Italian: [ˈriːta luˈiːza tˈtsukka]; 1912–1998) was an Italian radio announcer who broadcast Axis propaganda to Allied troops in North Africa and Italy. She became known as one of the "Axis Sallys", along with Mildred Gillars, who broadcast from Berlin, Germany.

== Early life ==
Zucca's father, Louis, owned a very successful restaurant in New York's Midtown district in the 1930s and 1940s, called Zucca's Italian Garden. Located at 116-118-120 West 49th Street, the restaurant had its own promotional postcards which displayed a distinctly refined setting. Zucca spent her teenage years in a convent school in Florence and, as a young woman, had worked in the family business.

She returned to Italy in 1938, working as a typist and renouncing her U.S. citizenship three years later to save her family's property from expropriation by Mussolini's government.

== Axis Sally ==
As the Allied invasion of North Africa progressed, the Fascist government of Benito Mussolini decided to try to emulate the German radio's Axis Sally broadcasts of Mildred Gillars. In the summer of 1943, the Italian national radio network in Rome hired the 30-year-old Zucca with this aim in mind, in spite of her losing a typing job in 1942 for copying an anti-Fascist pamphlet.

Zucca was teamed with German broadcaster Charles Goedel in the program Jerry's Front Calling. Much to Gillars' chagrin, Zucca was also referred to as Axis Sally despite being called other names by Allied Soldiers such as "Axis Mary", "Millan Mary", "Rosalia from Rome". Her broadcast had Anti-Semitic and negative remarks against Franklin D. Roosevelt and Winston Churchill and used racists remarks in propaganda against African and Asian soldiers fighting in Italy. Zucca's trademark sign-off was "a sweet kiss from Sally", and she was often mistaken for Gillars.

According to one account, Zucca signed onto each show by uttering "Hello Suckers!" and her signature tune was "Between the Devil and the Deep Blue Sea".

Her broadcasts sometimes used intelligence provided by the German embassy in Rome in an attempt to confuse Allied troops. On July 8, 1943, the night before the invasion of Sicily, Zucca's broadcast told "the wonderful boys of the 504th Parachute Regiment" that "Col. Willis Mitchell's playboys the 61st Troop Carrier Group are going to carry you to certain death. We know where and when you are jumping and you will be wiped out."

As the Allied armies advanced north into Rome, Zucca retreated north with the Germans in 1944 and resumed broadcasting from Milan. There, in September 1944, the broadcast crew of Jerry's Front was attached to a German military propaganda unit called the Liberty Station. By then Zucca was pregnant. Her son was born on December 15, 1944. She returned to the microphone 40 days later and continued until her final broadcast on April 25, 1945.

== Arrest ==
As the Axis forces finally collapsed, Zucca went by train to her uncle's home in Turin, where she took refuge until her identification and arrest on June 5, 1945.

A correspondent from the U.S. military magazine Stars and Stripes said that Zucca's well-known crossed-eye condition did nothing to detract from her attractiveness: "True, her left eye is inclined to wander — but that cooey, sexy voice really has something to back it up."

Newspapers in the United States were far more scathing. "Soft-Voiced 'Sally from Berlin' Found to Be Ugly Ex–N.Y. Girl" was a typical headline, with descriptions of the young mother as "[as] ugly and unattractive in person as her voice was appealing." Another journalist called her "cross-eyed, bow-legged and sallow-skinned."

== Trial ==
All attempts by the U.S. government to prosecute Zucca for treason failed when it became clear that she had renounced her U.S. citizenship before she started broadcasting. The FBI's J. Edgar Hoover wrote to the Justice Department: "In view of the fact that she has lost her American citizenship, no efforts are being made at the present time to develop a treason case against her."

Zucca was then tried by an Italian military tribunal on charges of collaboration. On March 29, 1946, she was sentenced to four and a half years in prison, but was released after nine months after the Italian government declared a general amnesty for collaborators in 1946.

== Later life ==
Zucca was barred from returning to the United States and lived in relative obscurity in Italy until her death in 1998.
