= Humam Abd al-Khaliq Abd al-Ghafur =

Iraqi politician (born 1945)

- همام عبد الخالق عبد الغفور

Minister of Education
- In office 2001–2003
- President: Saddam Hussein
- Prime Minister: Saddam Hussein
- In office 1992–1998
- President: Saddam Hussein
- Prime Minister: Mohammed Hamza Zubeidi; Ahmad Husayn Khudayir as-Samarrai; Saddam Hussein
- Preceded by: Abd al-Razzaq Qassem al-Hashemi

Minister of Culture and Information
- In office 1998–2001
- President: Saddam Hussein
- Prime Minister: Saddam Hussein
- Preceded by: Hamed Yousef Hammadi

Personal details
- Born: 1945 (age 80–81) Ramadi, Iraq
- Party: Iraqi Regional Branch of the Arab Socialist Ba'ath Party

Humam Abd al-Khaliq Abd al-Ghafur (Note: Arabic: همام عبد الخالق عبد الغفور) (born 1945) is an Iraqi academic and former politician.

== Biography ==
Humam Abd al-Khaliq Abd al-Ghafur was born in Ramadi, Anbar Governorate, in 1945. He had a role in the Iraqi nuclear program. In 1981, he was head of the Nuclear Research Center. Abdul-Razzaq Qassem al-Hashemi was appointed Minister of Higher Education and Scientific Research. Al-Khaliq held his previous position as vice-president of the Iraqi Atomic Energy Organization. Nuclear research.

He was appointed Minister of Higher Education and Scientific Research in 1992, succeeding Abd al-Razzaq Qassem al-Hashemi, and then held the position of Minister of Culture and Information in 1998, succeeding Hamed Yousef Hammadi. His successor as Acting Minister of Higher Education and Scientific Research Abdul-Jabbar Tawfiq, then Minister of Education Fahd Salem Al-Shakrah as acting Minister, then Hammam Abdul-Khaleq Abdul-Ghafour returned as Minister of Higher Education and Scientific Research in 2001.

== After the 2003 invasion ==
He was on the list of Iraqis wanted by the United States. He was arrested by the American occupation forces on 19 April 2003. It was alleged that he was arrested, he was thrown to the ground, and an American soldier stood with his feet on his head and neck, which caused him a permanent disability represented in the crookedness of his neck and the tilt of his head. He was released on 18 December 2005.
