= Propaganda in Japan =

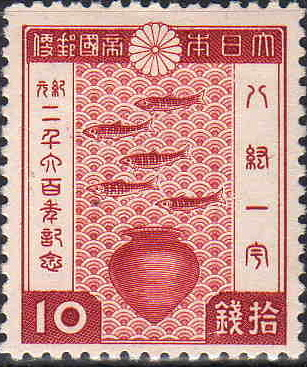
Prewar 10-sen Japanese stamp, promoting the expansionist concept of hakkō ichiu and the 2600th anniversary of the Empire.

In Japan, like in most other countries, propaganda has been a significant phenomenon during the 20th century.

Propaganda activities in Japan have been discussed as far back as the Russo-Japanese War of the first decade of the 20th century. Propaganda activities peaked during the period of the Second Sino-Japanese War and World War II. Scholar Koyama Eizo has been credited with developing much of the Japanese propaganda framework during that time.

Post-war, some activities of the democratic Japanese government have also been discussed as a form of propaganda, for example the cases of cooperation between anime producers and the Japan Self-Defense Force.

== Russo-Japanese War ==
The Russo-Japanese War (1904–1905) was a major war that resulted in the victory of the Japanese over the world power of the Russian Empire. This was a major victory for the Japanese as it displayed to the world the ability of an Eastern country to defeat a Western power in an all out war. This war was also one of the first instances of the Japanese nation presented to the world an image of the people of Japan as a wholly united, patriotic front whose people were able to make the greatest sacrifice for the benefit of their country. This was the cause of the Japanese propaganda machine, the Ministry of Foreign Affairs, who attempted to seize control of the narrative of Japan and gain a better understanding of the world's perception of the Japanese nation through the collection of foreign newspapers with mentions of the Japanese. One such example of this is the Japanese attempt to twist the words of Turkologist, Armin Vámbéry, by announcing that they had convinced him to rescind a paper regarding his previous anti-Japanese and 'yellow peril' themed work.

Internally, the Japanese propaganda machine displayed images of the war through the utilization of a variety of forms of visual media. The Ueno Panorama Hall and the Nippon Panorama Hall displayed images of the war to mold the image of the war in the minds of the Japanese people. This can be seen in Goseda Hōryū II's panorama regarding the Battle of the Sea of Japan.

With the creation of the first film camera, the usage of cinema allowed the average denizens of the major cities in Japan to have a visual representation of the war in motion. The war films gave the audiences of Japan the ability, for the first time, to view stimulating and updated visual news of the war as it progressed. Furthermore, the profit found within the cinematography of the war prompted international film companies to take part and allowed Japanese audiences to view an international perspective of the war as opposed to the one pedalled by the Ministry of Foreign Affairs. This era also provided Japanese audiences the ability to feel as if they were an active participant within the war rather than a passive viewer as had been seen with the Japanese prints utilized during the First Sino-Japanese War.

Another form of media that displays the propaganda about Japan regarding the Russo-Japanese War are the postcards handed out within the nation in the aftermath of the war. The victory for the Japanese instilled them with great vigour and pride at their defeat of a great Western power. In doing so, the Japanese began to be welcomed into the greater European world society and finally accepted as a proper world power. This new self-image of Japan can be seen within the postcards circulated internally within Japan. One postcard titled "Japan the Focus of International Communications" pictures Japan on a map alongside the European nations. Although not directly in the centre, the postcard depicts Japan on the edge of Europe. This presents the growing sentiment of the Japanese as a notable player on the world stage and the dominant nation in Asia while also sowing nationalistic sentiment. A secondary postcard from 1911 titled "Map of Japan", which commemorates the Crown Prince's visit, actively displays the beginnings of Japanese colonial intent by adding the nations acquired by Japan such as Korea which was annexed in 1910.

== Invading China ==
After the Mukden incident, the Kwantung Army seized radio facilities and began broadcasting propaganda back to Japan, aimed towards increasing Japanese public opinion in favor of its actions. To generate support for its invasion of northeast China, in the 1930s Japan used a propaganda campaign, the themes of which were repeated for months in newspaper headlines.

After invading Manchuria, the Japanese army increasingly viewed Mongolia as a target. From the early 1930s, cultural works, sometimes reinforced by western writers, were published to emphasize a special relationship between Japan and the Mongols as a precursor to military incursions into the region. Mongolia's significance to Japan declined after it changed strategy to focus on southern China and Southeast Asia.

Japan's propaganda in China during the Second Sino-Japanese War focused on promoting Japanese ideology and spreading misinformation. Ideological propaganda focused on promoting the Greater East Asia Co-Prosperity Sphere and the contention that Japan was fighting against Western imperialism. Japanese ideological propaganda was generally ineffective; Chinese generally perceived that the claimed benefits of peace, prosperity, and independence never materialized.

Promotion of misinformation through Japanese propaganda was more effective particularly due to Japan's ability to dominate the radio airwaves in China because of Japan's control over radio facilities in Beijing, Shanghai, and Nanjing. Among methods of misinformation was the broadcast by the collaborationist regimes of falsified speeches purporting to be from Chiang Kai-shek, Mao Zedong, and their generals.

== See also ==
- Propaganda kimono
