= Wanda Radio Station =

Soviet Polish-language propaganda radio station in World War II

Wanda Radio Station (Polish Radiostacja Wanda), was a Soviet Polish language propaganda broadcast station during World War II. It was named for Wanda, daughter of the legendary founder of Kraków.

Created in 1944, the Wanda Radio Station was attached to the Red Army units fighting on the Eastern Front. It operated daily, broadcasting news, lectures, and recorded Polish songs.

Before the Warsaw Uprising the broadcasts vowed for an armed uprising to be started in Warsaw in order to ease the crossing of the Vistula river by the Red Army. However, after the Uprising did break out the station halted all broadcasts and started to play music only. After the capitulation of the uprising on September 2, 1944 the broadcasts were restarted. Soviet propaganda underlined that general Tadeusz Bór-Komorowski was a traitor and that the Home Army started the uprising with no coordination with the Soviets.

There was also a German-controlled Wanda Radio Station in Rome during World War II. It was created in late 1943 and its main purpose was to encourage Polish troops fighting in Italy to desert.
