= Axis Sally =

Female radio personalities for Axis propaganda during WWII

Axis Sally was the generic nickname given to women radio personalities who broadcast English-language propaganda on behalf of the European Axis powers during World War II. These included:

- Mildred Gillars, a German American who broadcast for Nazi Germany. She was "the first woman in US history to be convicted of treason" by the United States and following her arrest in Berlin, "on 8 March 1949 was sentenced to ten to thirty years' imprisonment."
- Rita Zucca, an Italian American who broadcast for Fascist Italy.

On their radio shows, the two Axis Sally personalities would typically alternate between swing music and propaganda messages aimed at American troops. These messages would typically emphasize the value of surrender, stoke fears that soldiers' wives and girlfriends were cheating on them, and point out that the Axis powers knew their locations. American soldiers listened to Gillars' broadcasts for the popular music, even as they found her attempts at propaganda "laughable".

== See also ==
- Lord Haw-Haw
- Tokyo Rose
- Constance Drexel

== Bibliography ==
=== References ===
- Crofton, Ian (2009). Traitors & Turncoats: Twenty Tales of Treason from Benedict Arnold to Ezra Pound. London: Quercus. ISBN 978-1-8486-6011-3, 1-8486-6011-1; OCLC 298185611 (all editions).
1. Crofton, Ian (2010). Via Internet Archive (Kahle/Austin Foundation). Penguin. p. 131. ISBN 978-1-84866-011-3.
- Dear, Ian; Foot, M. R. D., eds. (2001) [1995]. "Axis Sally". The Oxford Companion to World War II. Oxford University Press. p. 97. OCLC 47356289 (all editions)
1. Dear, Ian; Foot, Michael Richard Daniell (1995). Via Internet Archive (South San Francisco Public Library) (1995 ed.). Oxford University Press. p. 97. ISBN 978-0-19-866225-9. ISBN 978-0-1921-4168-2, 0-1921-4168-6; ISBN 978-0-1986-6225-9, 0-1986-6225-4
2. Dear, Ian; Foot, M. R. D. (2001). Via Internet Archive (Cynthiana-Harrison Public Library) (2001 ed.). Oxford University Press, UK. p. 76. ISBN 978-0-19-860446-4. ISBN 978-0-1986-0446-4, 0-1986-0446-7.
- Lucas, Richard (2010). Axis Sally: The American Voice of Nazi Germany. Philadelphia: Casemate Publishers. ISBN 978-1-9351-4980-4, 1-9351-4980-6; ISBN 978-1-4804-0660-5, 1-4804-0660-0, ISBN 978-1-9351-4943-9, 1-9351-4943-1; OCLC 748408055 (all editions).
1. Via Los Angeles Public Library.
- Lucas, Richard (January–February 2010). "With a Sweet Kiss from SALLY: Fantasy and Reality Collided When Allied Investigators Hunted Down the Seductive Nazi Broadcaster Known to GIs as Axis Sally". World War II. 24 (5): 48–53 – via Gale Academic OneFile. EBSCOhost 45629480 (article); ProQuest 222361001 (article); ISSN 0898-4204 (journal).
