= Seoul City Sue =

North Korean propagandist

Anna Wallis Suh
- Suh in Korea, c. 1930
- Born: Anna Lois Wallis; 1900; Lawrence County, Arkansas, U.S.
- Died: 1969 (aged 68–69) (alleged); North Korea
- Cause of death: Execution (alleged)
- Other names: Seoul City Sue; Anna Wallace Suhr
- Education: Southeastern State Teachers College; Scarritt College for Christian Workers (B.A.)
- Occupation: Educator
- Employer(s): Methodist Missionary Organization; Shanghai American School; U.S. Legation Seoul; Korean Central News Agency
- Known for: Announcing propaganda on North Korean radio during the Korean War
- Spouse: Sŏ Kyu Ch’ŏl (서규철 徐奎哲)
- Parent(s): Albert B. and M. J. Wallis

Anna Wallis Suh (1900–1969), the woman generally associated with the nickname "Seoul City Sue," was an American Methodist missionary, educator, and North Korean propaganda radio announcer to the United States Armed Forces during the Korean War.

Suh was born in Arkansas, the youngest of six children. After her mother and father respectively died in 1910 and 1914, she relocated to Oklahoma to join a sister's family while she completed high school. She spent her early adult years as an office clerk and Sunday school teacher. Subsequently, she studied at the Southeastern State Teachers College, in Durant, and the Scarritt College for Christian Workers in Nashville, Tennessee, graduating in 1930 with a Bachelor of Arts in ministry. She spent the next eight years working as a member of the American Southern Methodist Episcopal Mission in Korea, then under Japanese rule. As Japanese authorities continued to restrict the activities of foreign missions, Suh joined the staff of Shanghai American School (SAS) in 1938. There she met and married fellow staff member Sŏ Kyu Ch’ŏl, thus losing her United States citizenship. Late in World War II she was interned by the Japanese for two years with Americans and Europeans at a camp in suburban Shanghai. After release, she resumed work at SAS for a year, before returning to Korea with her husband in 1946.

The Suhs settled in Seoul, where Suh taught at the U.S. Legation school until being fired in 1949 due to suspicion of her husband for left wing political activities. They remained or were trapped in Seoul during the North Korean army's invasion of South Korea in June 1950. Suh began announcing a short English-language program for North Korean "Radio Seoul" starting on or about July 18, continuing until shortly after the Inchon landing on September 15, when the Suhs were evacuated north as a part of the general withdrawal of North Korean forces. Subsequently, she continued broadcasts on Radio Pyongyang. The Suhs participated in the political indoctrination of US prisoners of war at a camp near Pyongyang in February 1951.

Charles Robert Jenkins, an American who defected to and then left North Korea, reported that Suh had been put in charge of English-language publications for the Korean Central News Agency after the war. Jenkins also stated that he was told in 1972 that Suh had been caught as a South Korean double agent in 1969 and executed.

== Early life ==
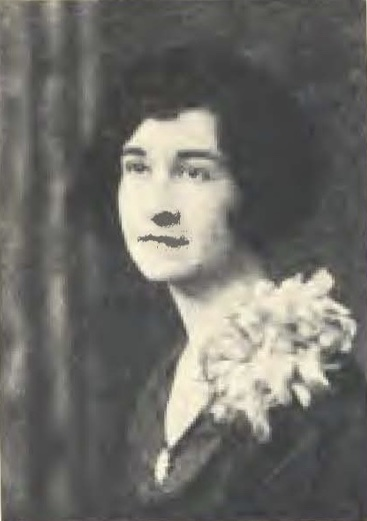
Anna Wallis Suh in 1928

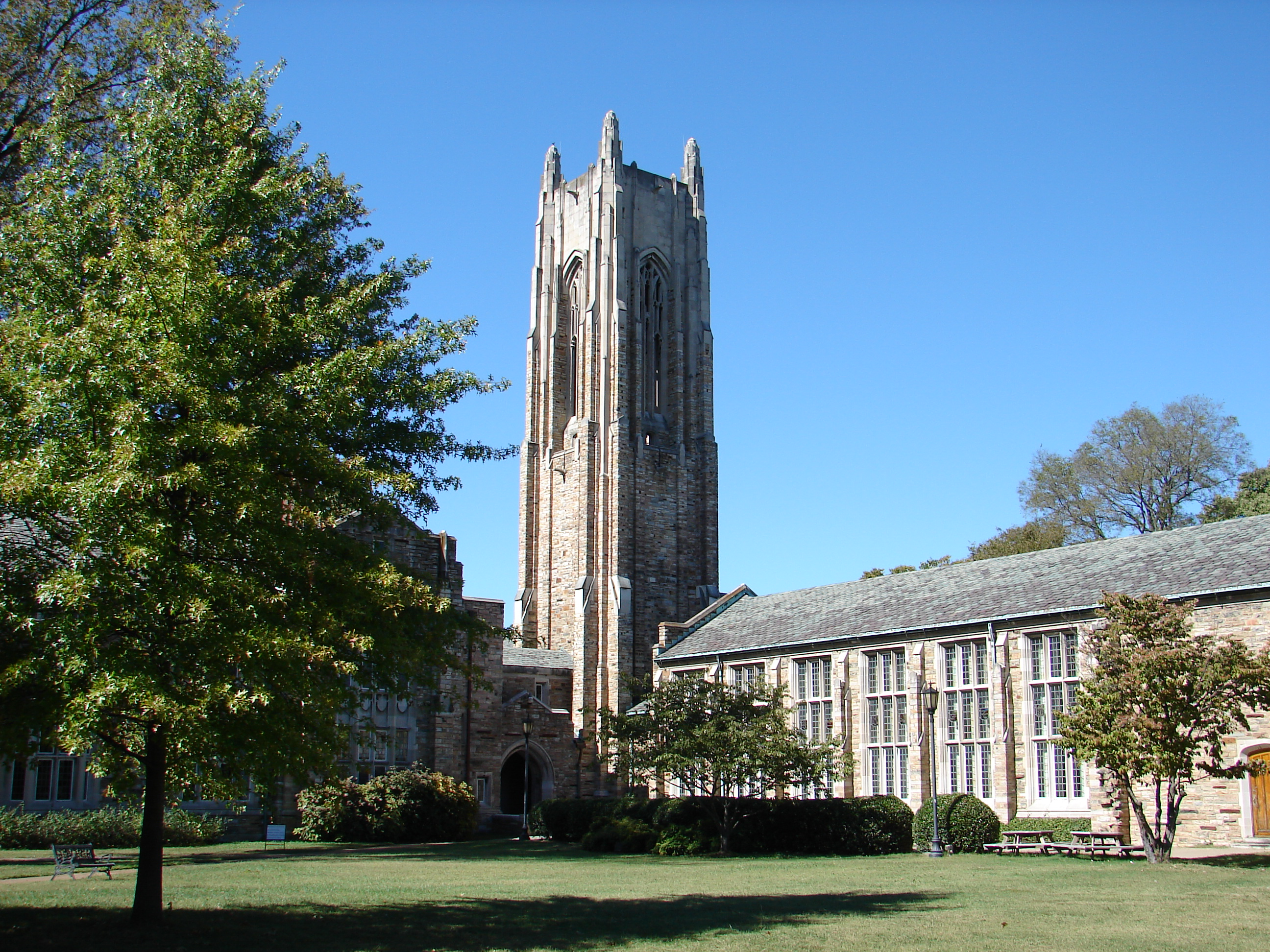
Scarritt College

Suh was born Anna Wallis to Albert B. and M. Jane Wallis in 1900 in Lawrence County, Arkansas. She was the youngest of six children.

Suh's parents died when she was young; her mother died some time between the 1900 and 1910 Census, and her father in October 1914. Subsequently, she relocated to Oklahoma with a sister. Suh attended the Southeastern State Teachers College, in Durant, Oklahoma, where she was a member of the Student Volunteer Movement. During her junior year, she was selected to attend the organization's 1928 quadrennial convention in Detroit. In 1929, she transferred to the Scarritt College for Christian Workers, an institution dedicated to the training of Methodist missionaries, in Nashville, Tennessee. Ann graduated with a B.A. in 1930.

== Korean mission and China ==
That same year, she was selected for a mission to Korea by the Southern Methodist Conference. There, she initially taught at a Methodist school. By the early 1930s, the Japanese colonial administration had largely banned foreigners from Christian proselytizing, and most Christian missions focused on education, medicine, and care for the indigent. She may have returned to the US in 1935 to visit a sister. In late 1936, she was appointed to serve at the Seoul Social Evangelistic Center, and in February 1937, visited Scarritt College during a missionary furlough.

In a move that may have reflected increasingly harsh Japanese measures against foreign missionaries in the late 30s, Suh relocated to China to join the staff of the Shanghai American School (SAS) in 1938. There she met Sŏ Kyu Ch’ŏl (서규철 徐奎哲, also spelled Suh Kyoon Chul), who was hired to teach Korean and assist in school administration. They married at the United States Court for China on December 9, 1939. She was dropped from the rolls of the missionary service and lost her United States citizenship after they married. She developed an interest in Korean politics, eventually taking up her husband's leftist views. The cosmopolitan Shanghai International Settlement and French Concession were likely a more accepting environment for the Suhs than homogeneous 1940s Korea would later prove to be, as suggested by the number of other Caucasian women on staff married to Asian men. In 1939, she visited San Francisco in an unsuccessful attempt to secure a US passport for her husband.

== Sino-Japanese War ==
Americans in Shanghai began to depart that same year, slowly as tensions rose in the environs of the city, then en masse shortly before the US and Japan officially went to war. SAS remained open until February 1943, when the remaining foreign staff were forced into the Chapei Civilian Relocation Center, a short distance away in the northern suburbs. This internment camp, one of several in and around Shanghai, occupied a three-story dormitory on the grounds of Great China University (now East China Normal University), most of which was damaged or destroyed during the 1937 Battle of Shanghai.

In March 1943, Suh also entered the Chapei center along with the remaining non-Asian school staff, while her husband may have remained free as a colonial subject of Japan. During the internment, the SAS staff and parents took advantage of the school's books that had followed them to organize classes for the children. Supplies with which to maintain the internees grew short towards the end of the war, and a number of women married to citizens of Axis powers or neutral countries were released in late 1944. It is possible that Suh was among these. In March 1943, a missionary family, R.W. and M.F. Howes, along with their two girls, were interned in Chapei—the Japanese official name was Chapei Civil Assembly Center. Most of the people were Canadian or American, with some central European citizens. And later some British citizens were added from a camp further west up the Yangtze which the Japanese closed.

In December 1943, she was staying at Shanghai General Hospital, originally a Catholic hospital, but during the war under Japanese control though still staffed by Catholic sisters.

Suh was released from the Chapei center and returned to Shanghai in June 1944.

With Suh's formal release from detention at the end of World War II, she joined the staff of the reconstituted SAS for the 1945-46 school year.

== Korean War ==
Unable to continue earning a sufficient living in post-war Shanghai, she and her husband returned to liberated Korea, where she tutored children at the US Diplomatic Mission School in Seoul. Her employment was terminated after her husband was investigated for left wing activities. Shortly thereafter, North Korea invaded the South in June 1950.

The Korean People's Army occupied Seoul three days after the start of hostilities. The speed of the advance caught the majority of residents by surprise and unprepared to evacuate, in part due to ROK radio propaganda rather at odds with the actual situation. Suh and her husband remained as well, perhaps because he was unwilling to abandon a school for indigent boys that he administered. During a July 10 meeting in Seoul that included 48 to 60 members of the ROK National Assembly, the couple pledged their loyalty to the North Korean regime.

Under Dr. Lee Soo, an English instructor from Seoul University, Suh began announcing for North Korean "Radio Seoul" from the Korean Broadcasting System's HLKA studios, with daily programs from 09:30 to 22:15 local time, first heard as early as July 18. The Suhs had been relocated to a temporary home near the station. Suh's defenders gave the dull tone of her broadcasts as proof that she was being forced to make them.

Her initial scripts suggested that American soldiers return to their corner ice cream stands, criticized the USAF bombing campaign, and reported names recovered from the dog tags of dead American soldiers to a background of soft music. The GIs gave her various nicknames, including "Rice Ball-" or "Rice Bowl Maggie", "Rice Ball Kate", and "Seoul City Sue". The latter name stuck, likely derived from "Sioux City Sue", the title of a song initially made popular by Zeke Manners from 1946. Through the rest of the summer of 1950, her reports would announce the names of recently captured US airmen, marines, and soldiers, threaten new units arriving in the country, welcome warships by name as they arrived on station, or taunt African-American soldiers regarding their limited civil rights at home. Her monotone on-air delivery and the lack of popular music programming evidently left Suh's broadcasts less enjoyable for her intended audience than German and Japanese English-language radio shows during World War II.

Radio Seoul went off the air at the start of a "Sue" program during an August 13 air strike on communications and transportation facilities in the city, as a B-26 bomber dropped 200 lbs fragmentation bombs adjacent to the transmitter. The station came back on the air a week or two later. North Korean forces evacuated the Suhs to North Korea by truck after the Inchon landings, a few days before US forces entered the city. The Suhs joined the staff of Radio Pyongyang, where she continued English-language broadcasts to UN forces. They were temporarily reassigned to indoctrinate UN POWs at Camp 12 near Pyongyang in February 1951, after which the POWs were directed to continue indoctrinating each other, with Korean supervision.

== Later life ==
Fellow defector Charles Robert Jenkins made several claims about Suh in his book The Reluctant Communist that have not been independently verified. He reported that, some time after the war, she was put in charge of English language publications for the Korean Central News Agency. He wrote that he saw her in a photo for a 1962 propaganda pamphlet called "I Am A Lucky Boy", dining with Larry Allen Abshier, a US Army deserter and defector. Jenkins reported meeting her briefly in 1965 at the "foreigners only" section of the No. 2 Department Store in Pyongyang. Jenkins also stated that he was told in 1972 that Suh had been discovered to be a South Korean double agent in 1969 and executed.

== Nationality ==
Based on US law through the 1930s, citizenship for a married woman was almost exclusively based on that of her husband, particularly if they lived in his native land. Therefore, Suh lost her US citizenship when she married Suh Kyoon Chul in China. Suh Kyoon Chul, as well as all other native residents of Korea and Taiwan, were nationals of the Empire of Japan, which recognized itself as a multi-ethnic state. Suh may not have recognized her situation until the 1939 visit to San Francisco to secure a US passport for her husband. In addition to her status as a Japanese national, the US had almost completely frozen Asian immigration with the Immigration Act of 1924, which would likely have precluded his obtaining a passport.

Arbitrary application of Japanese and US law may have dogged Suh over the following years. When the Japanese interned most ethnic Europeans within the Empire during World War II, it is not clear whether she was forced into the Chapei Relocation Center, or entered it willingly, since she was not a foreign national. Later, during the US military occupation of southern Korea, an attempt was made to restore her US citizenship, an effort which fell through for unknown reasons. It is possible that she became a national of South Korea as the wife of Mr. Suh. The Korean nationality that became reestablished between the end of World War II and the formal independence of the ROK in 1948 didn't distinguish between spouses. Although US forces sought her out after retaking Seoul in September 1950, officials recognized that it was unlikely that Suh could be charged with treason by the US.

== In popular culture ==
During the Korean War, USAF pilots improvised a spoof of Zeke Manner's hit "Sioux City Sue" using the most popular nickname for Suh.

In several episodes of the TV series M*A*S*H a North Korean announcer calling herself "Seoul City Sue" is heard on the radio (rebroadcast over the camp's PA). In "Bombed" she tells the GIs that their wives and girlfriends are being unfaithful and they would have more prosperous careers as civilians. In "38 Across" she accuses Hawkeye Pierce of war crimes for performing an experimental technique to successfully save the life of a North Korean POW.

== See also ==
- Propaganda in North Korea
