= Government crowdsourcing =

Government crowdsourcing is a form of crowdsourcing employed by governments to better leverage their constituents' collective knowledge and experience. It has tended to take the form of public feedback, project development, or petitions in the past, but has grown to include public drafting of bills and constitutions, among other things. This form of public involvement in the governing process differs from older systems of popular action, from town halls to referendums, in that it is primarily conducted online or through a similar IT medium.

Various thinkers, including but not limited to Daren Brabham, Beth Noveck, and Helene Landemore, have each presented their own definitions of what crowdsourcing as a whole, and government crowdsourcing by extension, necessarily entails, but there has been no consensus thus far. Governments which have adopted crowdsourcing as a method of information gathering, policy guidance, and in some cases a vital part of the lawmaking process include Brazil, Finland, Iceland, Egypt, Tunisia, and the United States, among many others.

== Precursors to government crowdsourcing ==
Though, in the past, direct democracy employed many of the same mechanisms as government crowdsourcing, and indeed could resemble it at times, the objectives direct democracy tended to pursue and the methods it used set it apart. Crowdsourcing requires a specific goal, rewards to be gained by both the crowd and the government, and an open request for anyone to participate, as well as to be conducted through the internet or some other IT medium. Programs which truly resembled pre-Internet government crowdsourcing did not emerge until the 17th and 18th centuries. These were government-sponsored competitions such as the Alkali prize, which lead to the development of the Leblanc Process, and the Longitude Prize.

Other early precursors to government crowdsourcing either followed the same model of reaching out in search of an expert or inventor capable of solving the problem at hand, via what Brabham refers to as the "broadcast-search model". The American government distributed large tasks, such as mapping wind and current patterns along trade routes among American sailors, delegating the discovery of existing knowledge to a crowd in a model similar to what is now referred to as "distributed human intelligence tasking".

Finally, the French Cahiers de doléances were the most directly governmental example of pre-internet government crowdsourcing. In the lead up to the French Revolution, the three estates listed their grievances and made suggestions to improve the government. These problems, complaints, and proposals were considered and debated through the sessions of the Estates general. Similar efforts to hear the grievances and suggestions of subjects, and later constituents, can be seen at the heart of various political institutions around the world, such as town halls in the United States, petitions in the United Kingdom and beyond.

== Modern government crowdsourcing ==
Today, government crowdsourcing follows similar models, albeit utilizing the internet, mobile phones and other IT mediums. Around the world, governments continue to use competitions, delegate large tasks, and reach out to their constituents for feedback both on specific bills and for guidance on various policies. They have also begun, in countries as different as Brazil, British Columbia, and Finland, to not only draw feedback, expertise, and ideas from the crowd, but also specific provisions and wordings for legislation and even constitutions. These initiatives, which give participating constituents greater leeway to both develop their ideas, deliberate, and be heard, mirroring what Brabham describes as "peer-vetted creative crowdsourcing".

The established models persist, but attempts at crowd law and crowdsourced constitutions have met with mixed results. In some cases, the crowdsourcing platform has been purely suggestive, as in British Columbia, and their proposal ultimately put to a vote. Generally, once those crowdsourced suggestions entered the political system, they were either voted down or buried under mountains of procedural delay. In other rarer cases, the efforts succeeded and the crowdsourced laws were adopted, though in somewhat amended form, as happened with the Brazilian Internet Bill of Rights and in the Constitutional Convention (Ireland). Other efforts to crowdsource government are still in process, or have only been tested on a limited scale, leaving their long-term results still uncertain.

In several post-revolutionary moments, notably those of Tunisia, Iceland, and Egypt, the new governments have also used crowdsourcing as a means of securing legitimacy and addressing the issues which brought them into power in the first place. This method of constitution making has been met with a limited level of success. The Icelandic constitution, crowdsourced in the aftermath of the 2009 Icelandic financial crisis protests, utilized a multi-layered crowdsourcing structure, with an elected council at the top synthesizing suggestions into the new constitution, a popular forum for the crowd to make their voiced heard, and a Constitutional committee to organize the other parts. By contrast, the Egyptian and Tunisian constitutional processes involved the crowd much less, with an official constitutional assembly composed of traditional political elites who simply received feedback on their draft clauses online.

== Defining government crowdsourcing ==
Today, there is still no definitive definition of crowdsourcing, and even less agreement as to what aspects of participatory democracy fit under that description. Most academics and writers tend to create their own definitions. The most expansive definition of crowdsourcing, drawn from a survey of thousands of papers on the topic, describes it as something for which: (a) there is a clearly defined crowd; (b) there exists a task with a clear goal; (c) the recompense received by the crowd is clear; (d) the crowd-sourcer is clearly identified; (e) the compensation to be received by the crowd-sourcer is clearly defined; (f) it is an online assigned process of participative type; (g) it uses an open call of variable extent; (h) it uses the internet

Other definitions are less exhaustive and more case-specific. Helene Landemore, following a similar line of thought as Brabham, defines crowdsourcing as an online problem-solving and production model in which an undefined crowd helps to complete a task by submitting knowledge, information, or talent. In its unrefined form, there is no accountability mechanism, and the crowd, unlike contractors in an outsourcing system, is not vetted. She further distinguishes it from Wikipedia-esque "commons-based peer production", noting that crowdsourcing generally takes the form of individuals commenting and making suggestions in a vacuum as opposed to deliberating, discussing, and collaborating with one another.

Brahbam also makes a subtle distinction, which makes his definition substantially more restrictive. For an aspect of participatory government to be crowdsourcing, it cannot be purely a government-driven sequence of responses from the crowd. Both sides must engage in direction and deliberation on the project. Under this definition, certain elements of governmental participation, such as the Peer to Patent project are not crowdsourcing at all, but rather similar processes which have been agglomerated under a new and trendy name.

Mabhoudi, on the other hand, defines it purely in terms of constitution making. His conception of crowdsourcing consists of posting a draft constitution online, utilizing both official websites and social media pages. Those platforms were used for feedback, commentary, recommendations, and possibly final approval. Left out of his definition, but noted in his description of the process of Egyptian constitution making is the use of committees to document, digest, and synthesize the volumes of online feedback into a more readable form, which served an indispensable role in the success, however temporary, of the crowdsourcing process.

Noveck refers to government crowdsourcing as "collaborative democracy". She defines that as a process of using technology to improve government outcomes by soliciting experience from groups of self-selected peers working together in groups of open networks. Her version of government crowdsourcing more closely resembles the government competitions of the 17th and 18th centuries, or Amazon's Mechanical Turk, than the more participatory model favored by other thinkers. That is, crowds gathered to work on an agenda set out by the government, pooling their diverse expertise to cover every possible field of information.

== Examples of government crowdsourcing ==
=== United States Federal Government ===
==== Office of Personnel Management (OPM) ====
Open Opportunities is a government wide program offering professional development opportunities to current federal employees and internships to students. The program facilitates collaboration and knowledge sharing across the Federal Government.

Open Opportunities is for federal employees looking to gain additional experience, and students looking for internships. The program offers a wide variety of real world projects that promote experiential learning.

==== Department of State ====
The Virtual Student Foreign Service is a crowd-work and eIntern program for college students.

The Office of eDiplomacy is developing an internal crowdsourcing platform called CrowdWork that will facilitate collaborative work worldwide. Any office or mission will be able to post tasks online and any State Department employee with the requisite skills will be able to respond and complete the task. This creates an internal marketplace for foreign affairs work and matches State Department opportunities and requirements with untapped skills and experience. The platform is currently under development with an anticipated launch in December 2013. This crowd-work platform will be developed as part of an innovation toolkit for the U.S. Government. This project is developed through a partnership between the State Department office of eDiplomacy, the White House Office of Science and Technology Policy, the General Services Administration and the State Department Office of the Director General. The crowd work element of the innovation toolkit will be developed as an open-source platform for public use.

The State Department Sounding Board is an internal ideation tool for employees to suggest improvements to the department.

The Humanitarian Information Unit (HIU), a division within the Office of the Geographer and Global Issues at the U.S. Department of State, is working to increase the availability of spatial data in areas experiencing humanitarian emergencies. Built from a crowdsourcing model, the new "Imagery to the Crowd" process publishes high-resolution commercial satellite imagery, purchased by the United States Government, in a web-based format that can be easily mapped by volunteers. The digital map data generated by the volunteers are stored in a database maintained by OpenStreetMap (OSM), a UK-registered non-profit foundation, under a license that ensures the data are freely available and open for a range of uses.

Inspired by the success of the OSM mapping effort after the 2010 Haiti earthquake, the Imagery to the Crowd process harnesses the combined power of satellite imagery and the volunteer mapping community to help aid agencies provide informed and effective humanitarian assistance, and plan recovery and development activities. The HIU partners with the Humanitarian OpenStreetMap Team (HOT) on many of the Imagery to the Crowd projects. HOT provides volunteer support and access to its micro-tasking platform, the OSM Tasking Manager, which coordinates volunteer efforts by breaking down large mapping tasks into smaller areas that can be digitized in 45–60 minutes. A 5-minute Imagery to the Crowd Ignite talk is available.

The Bureau of Education and Cultural Affairs partnered with RocketHub on the Alumni Engagement and Innovation Fund (AEIF) 2.0 which helps exchange program alumni crowdsource funding for their innovative projects.

The Special Advisor for Civil Society and Emerging Democracies created Diplomacy Lab as a way for the department to crowdsource longer-term projects from the academic community.

Human Resource's Flex Connect program facilitates crowdsourcing of talent from across the department.

eDiplomacy is also piloting a State Department GitHub Account to collaborate on open source software projects.

The Bureau of Arms Control, Verification and Compliance also ran a crowdsourced Arms Control Challenge examining how technology could aid arms control efforts.

==== USAID ====
In June 2012, USAID launched the Agency's first-ever crowdsourcing initiative to pinpoint the location of USAID Development Credit Authority (DCA) loan data and make the dataset publicly available. Crowdsourcing is a distributed problem-solving process whereby tasks are outsourced to a network of people known as "the crowd".

The engagement of the Crowd was an innovative way to process data and increase the transparency of the Agency. Visualizing where USAID enhances the capacity of the private sector can signal new areas for potential collaboration with host countries, researchers, development organizations, and the public. A case study explains the organizational, legal, and technical steps behind making these data open.

==== Department of Health and Human Services ====
CDCology is a way for CDC staff to post unclassified, one-minute to one-day long (micro)tasks that can be solved by undergraduate, graduate, and post-graduate student volunteers. This expands the agency's workforce and relieves staff to focus on in-depth assignments. In return, universities can offer students short challenges directly impacting national initiatives and gain experience with government work. This allows students to bring fresh ideas to smaller projects and they can add "micro-volunteering for CDC" to their résumé.

==== Environmental Protection Agency ====
Pilot project launched by the Administrator's office called Skills Marketplace allowing micro-details to other offices and projects.

==== General Services Administration ====
Challenge.gov is an online challenge platform administered by the U.S. General Services Administration (GSA) in partnership with Challenge Post that empowers the U.S. Government and the public to bring the best ideas and top talent to bear on our nation's most pressing challenges. This platform is the latest milestone in the Administration's commitment to use prizes and challenges to promote innovation.

==== Transportation Security Administration ====
Idea Factory empowers the Transportation Security Administration's large and dispersed workforce to submit and collaborate on innovative ideas to improve TSA and keep the nation's transportation systems secure.

==== Smithsonian Institution ====
Digital Volunteers is a crowd-work platform for transcribing historical documents.

eMammal is a crowdsourcing collection of images and data on N American mammal populations

==== National Archives ====
The National Archives uses digital volunteers to identify signatures in documents and index the archive.

==== United States Holocaust Memorial Museum ====
Remember Me is a project to post 1100 pictures of children displaced during the Jewish Holocaust to identify these children, piece together information about their wartime and postwar experiences, and facilitate renewed connections among these young survivors, their families, and other individuals who were involved in their care during and after the war.

The World Memory Project aims to digitize the records of victims of the Jewish Holocaust.

==== US Army ====
CoCreate is a crowdsourced effort to identify and solve real life soldier challenges.

==== US Navy ====
The US Navy crowdsourced solutions to Somali Piracy via its Massive Multiplayer Online Wargame Leveraging the Internet. It is a message-based game to encourage innovative thinking by many people, connected via the Web. It has been used to study a number of topics, such as how the Navy can prepare for the future of energy......starting in 2021 and beyond

==== United States Patent and Trademark Office (USPTO) ====
The United States Patent and Trademark Office (USPTO) has been working to integrate crowdsourcing into the patent process in a number of ways. The first key step was the introduction of the Peer to Patent program at the application review stage. Peer to Patent was designed to allow members of the public with relevant technical skills and information to submit information useful to the patent examiner when assessing the claims of pending patent applications. The first pilot Peer to Patent program, limited to software and business methods applications, was launched in 2007 and remained open through 2009. After reviewing the results, a second expanded pilot was launched in 2010, extending coverage to include biotechnology, bioinformatics, telecommunications, and speech recognition.

The USPTO was further encouraged to implement crowdsourcing by the Obama Administration's Executive Action on Crowdsourcing Prior Art. The order was created with the goal of improving patent quality overall and fostering innovation by integrating new ways for companies, experts, and the general public to find and submit "prior art" or evidence needed to ascertain if an invention is novel.

Having tested crowdsourcing during the application review process, the USPTO turned to explore applications for crowdsourcing during post-grant patent review. To do this, the USPTO consulted experts in the government and private sector to share their expertise through two roundtable discussions. The Roundtable on the Use of Crowdsourcing and Third-Party Preissuance Submissions to Identify Relevant Prior Art, took place April 10, 2014. Presenters at the roundtable included Andrea Casillas and Christopher Wong sharing their experience with Peer to Patent; Micah Siegel from Ask Patents, a patent crowdsourcing project through stack exchange; Pedram Sameni from Patexia, a crowdsourcing platform focused on patent research and prior art searching; and Cheryl Milone of Article One Partners.

The USPTO held their second roundtable on the use of crowdsourcing to identify relevant prior art on December 2, 2014. This roundtable focused on two key questions: (1) how the USPTO can utilize crowdsourcing tools to obtain relevant prior art in order to enhance the quality of examination and issued patents; and (2) ways the USPTO can leverage existing private sector solutions for the electronic receipt and hosting of crowdsourced materials as a means to provide prior art to examiners. Speakers at the roundtable included Matt Levy (Computer & Communications Industry Association), Mark Nowotarski (Markets, Patents & Alliances LLC), Cheryl Milone (Article One Partners), and Pedram Sameni (Patexia Inc.).

The USPTO continues to consider additional applications for crowdsourcing following the roundtables and public comments submitted in response. As part of that goal, they are working with Christopher Wong, who was appointed to be the Presidential Innovation Fellow supporting crowdsourcing and patent reform initiatives for the USPTO.

=== United Kingdom ===
==== National Health Service ====
The Patient Feedback Challenge is about getting the NHS to use feedback from patients to improve services, by spreading the best approaches already out there. Ideas are crowdsourced, and then bid on by NHS organizations.

==== Foreign and Commonwealth Office ====
Since 2010 the FCO has made the Human Rights and Democracy Report available online and available for markup by NGOs, policy makers, academics and the general public. The comments are forwarded to the relevant policy teams for evaluation and to respond to accordingly.
