= Office of eDiplomacy =

Technology think tank for the United States

The Office of eDiplomacy was an applied technology think tank for the United States Department of State. The office was staffed by Foreign and Civil Service Officers in a wide range of specializations. At the time of its closure in July 2025 there were two branches: the Diplomatic Innovation Division (DID) and the Knowledge Leadership Division (KLD).

The office was formed in response to recommendations from the 1999 Overseas Presence Advisory Panel that the State Department improve its ability to communicate and share knowledge.

== History ==
Following the recommendations of a Blue Ribbon panel created in the aftermath of the 1998 East Africa Embassy bombing, in 2002, Ambassador James Holmes started the eDiplomacy Task Force. In 2003, the task force was reorganized into the Office of eDiplomacy. The Office was closed July 1, 2025 as part of the State Department reorganization.

At the time of its closure, eDiplomacy fell under the Deputy Chief Information Officer for Business, Management, and Planning.

Ryan Gliha was the last Director, James Fennell was the Chief of eDiplomacy's Knowledge Leadership Division, and Christian Jones was Chief of the Diplomatic Innovation Division.

Other previous eDiplomacy Directors at the U.S. Department of State include:

- Joe Johnson
- Gerry Gallucci
- Gary Galloway (acting)
- Thomas Niblock
- Stephen Smith
- Daniel P. Sheerin (acting)
- Richard Boly
- Ambassador Eric G. Nelson
- Kathryn Cabral
- M. Andre Goodfriend
- Rahima Kandahari
- David McCormick
- Joel Maybury
- Ryan Gliha

== Major programs ==
The Office of eDiplomacy launched and managed several knowledge management and new media technology programs for the U.S. Department of State.

Among the most active are:

- Digital Change Initiative - the Office of eDiplomacy supported the rapid transition of State Department employees to online and remote work in response to the COVID-19 pandemic, focused on leading adoption of Microsoft Teams for communications and collaboration.
- Diplopedia, the State Department's internal collaborative online wiki.
- Communities @ State, an initiative enables State Department personnel with shared professional interests to form internal online communities to publish information, connect with others, and create discussion.
- The Virtual Student Federal Service (VSFS) program, part of a continuing effort by the State Department to harness technology, encourage a commitment to global service among young people, and to facilitate new forms of diplomatic engagement.

After developing and launching the State Department Sounding Board in 2009, Office of eDiplomacy staff supported this internal idea sharing forum, now managed by the Management Bureau and the Secretary of State's cadre.

Virtual Work Environments were initiated by the Office of eDiplomacy with Windows SharePoint Services (WSS), and used in many units at State. The State Messaging and Archive Retrieval Toolset (SMART) program leads the WSS deployment effort.

== Other media mentions ==
- Advancing U.S. Foreign Policy through eDiplomacy
- The Office of eDiplomacy examines the five-year journey of Diplopedia
- "Igniting Innovation," State Magazine, January 2015

== See also ==
- Government crowdsourcing
- State Department Sounding Board
- Transformational Diplomacy
- United States Department of State
- United States Cyber-Diplomacy
