= VSFS =

VSFS may refer to:

- Victoria's Secret Fashion Show, a fashion show sponsored by Victoria's Secret
- Virtual Student Foreign Service, U.S. Department of State program
