= Condoleezza Rice as Secretary of State =

Leadership of the US Department of State

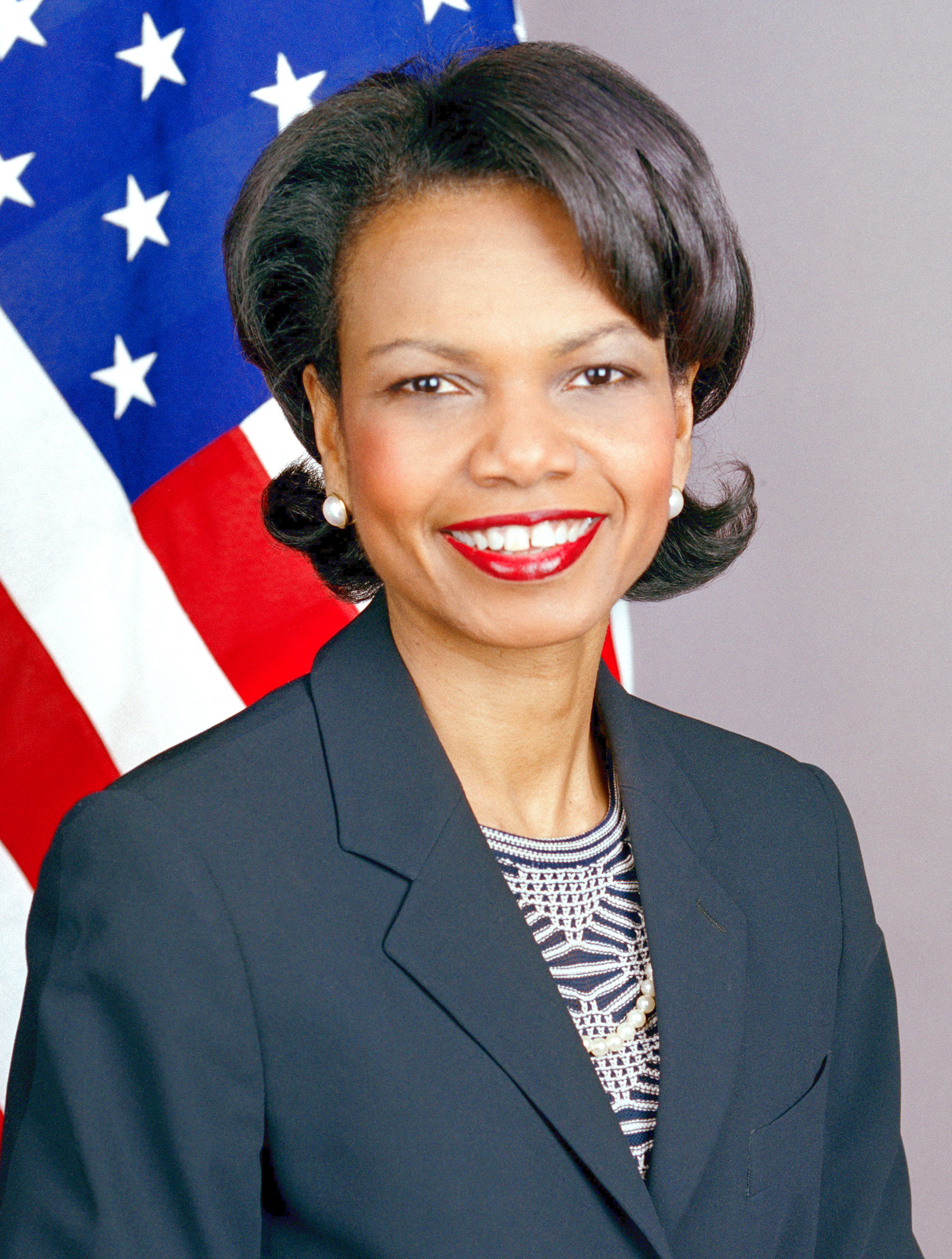
- Official portrait, 2005
- Condoleezza Rice as Secretary of State; January 26, 2005 – January 20, 2009
- Party: Republican
- Nominated by: George W. Bush
- Seat: Harry S Truman Building
- Seal of the United States Secretary of State

Condoleezza Rice served as the 66th United States secretary of state, under President George W. Bush, from 2005 to 2009, overseeing the department that conducted the foreign policy of George W. Bush. She was preceded in office by Colin Powell, and succeeded by Hillary Clinton. As secretary of state she traveled widely and initiated many diplomatic efforts on behalf of the Bush administration.

== Nomination and confirmation ==
On November 16, 2004, President Bush nominated Rice to succeed Colin Powell as secretary of state. Her confirmation hearings were held on January 18 and 19, 2005. On January 26, 2005, the Senate confirmed her nomination by a vote of 85–13. The negative votes, the most cast against any nomination for secretary of state since 1825, came from senators who, according to Senator Barbara Boxer, wanted "to hold Dr. Rice and the Bush administration accountable for their failures in Iraq and in the war on terrorism." Their reasoning was that Rice had acted irresponsibly in equating Hussein's regime with Islamist terrorism and some could not accept her previous record. Senator Robert Byrd voted against Rice's appointment, indicating that she "has asserted that the President holds far more of the war power than the Constitution grants him."

== Staff ==
Rice's senior advisor was Shirin R. Tahir-Kheli.

== Major initiatives ==
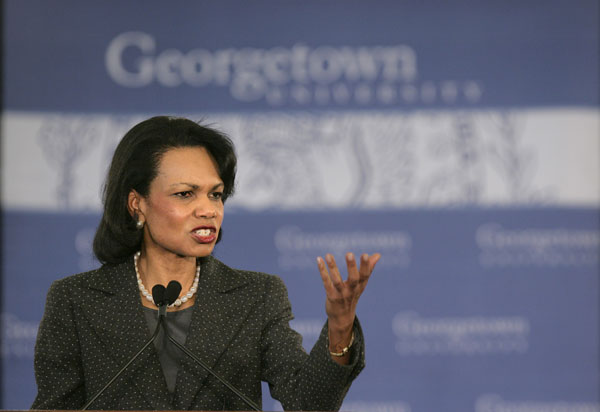
Rice unveils her plan for restructuring American foreign policy, which she calls "Transformational Diplomacy," during a January 18, 2006 speech at Georgetown University.

As Secretary of State, Rice championed the expansion of democratic governments. Rice stated that 9/11 was rooted in "oppression and despair" and so, the US must advance democratic reform and support basic rights throughout the greater Middle East. Rice has also reformed and restructured the department, as well as US diplomacy as a whole. "Transformational Diplomacy" is the goal that Rice describes as "work[ing] with our many partners around the world ... [and] build[ing] and sustain[ing] democratic, well-governed states that will respond to the needs of their people and conduct themselves responsibly in the international system."

Rice's Transformational Diplomacy involves five core elements:

- Relocating American diplomats to the places in the world where they are needed most, such as China, India, Brazil, Egypt, Nigeria, Indonesia, South Africa, and Lebanon.
- Requiring diplomats to serve some time in hardship locations such as Iraq, Afghanistan, Sudan, and Angola; gain expertise in at least two regions; and become fluent in two foreign languages, such as Chinese, Arabic, or Urdu.
- Focusing on regional solutions to problems like terrorism, drug trafficking, and diseases.
- Working with other countries on a bilateral basis to help them build a stronger infrastructure, and decreasing foreign nations' dependence on American hand-outs and assistance.
- Creating a high-level position, Director of Foreign Assistance, to oversee US foreign aid, thus de-fragmenting US foreign assistance.

Rice said that these moves were needed to help "maintain security, fight poverty, and make democratic reforms" in these countries and would help improve foreign nations's legal, economic, healthcare, and educational systems.

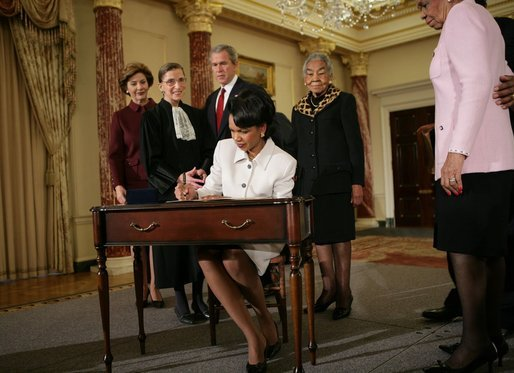
Rice signs official papers after receiving the oath of office during her ceremonial swearing in at the Department of State. Watching on are, from left, Laura Bush, Justice Ruth Bader Ginsburg, President George W. Bush and an unidentified family member.

Another aspect of Transformational Diplomacy is the emphasis on finding regional solutions. Rice also pressed for finding transnational solutions as well, stating that "in the 21st century, geographic regions are growing ever more integrated economically, politically and culturally. This creates new opportunities but it also presents new challenges, especially from transnational threats like terrorism and weapons proliferation and drug smuggling and trafficking in persons and disease."

Another aspect of the emphasis on regional solutions is the implementation of small, agile, "rapid-response" teams to tackle problems like disease, instead of the traditional approach of calling on experts in an embassy. Rice explained that this means moving diplomats out of the "back rooms of foreign ministries" and putting more effort into "localizing" the State Department's diplomatic posture in foreign nations. The Secretary emphasized the need for diplomats to move into the largely unreached "bustling new population centers" and to spread out "more widely across countries" in order to become more familiar with local issues and people.

Rice restructured US foreign assistance, naming Randall L. Tobias, an AIDS relief expert, as administrator of USAID (U.S. Agency for International Development). Tobias, as a deputy secretary of state, had the job of focusing foreign assistance efforts and de-fragmenting the disparate aid offices to improve effectiveness and efficiency.

Rice says these initiatives are necessary because of the highly "extraordinary time" in which Americans live. She compares the moves to the historic initiatives taken after World War II, which she claims helped stabilize Europe as it is known today. Rice states that her Transformational Diplomacy is not merely about "influencing" or "reporting on" governments, but "changing people's lives" through tackling the issues like AIDS, the education of women, and the defeat of violent extremism.

In early 2007, Rice indicated that State Department employees were "volunteering in large numbers," yet Defense Secretary Robert Gates expressed concerns regarding a request from Rice that military personnel fill jobs in Iraq that are the responsibility of the State Department.

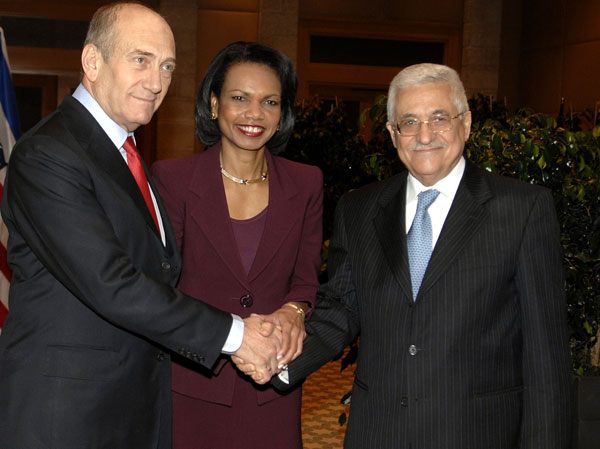
Rice meets with Israeli prime minister Ehud Olmert and Palestinian president Mahmoud Abbas at a trilateral meeting in Jerusalem, February 2007.

== Travels and aspirations ==
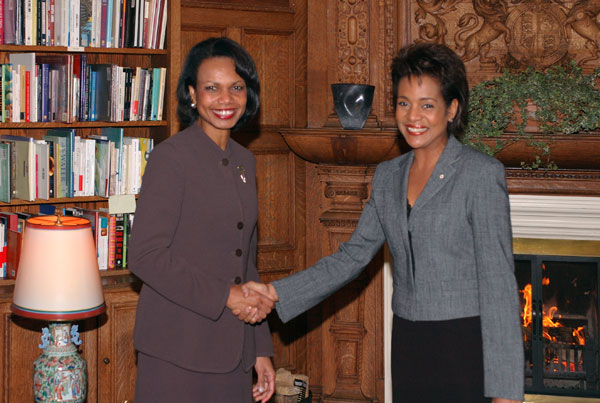
Condoleezza Rice visits Governor General of Canada, Michaëlle Jean in Ottawa, Ontario the Canadian capital.

As of September 7, 2008 Secretary Rice has visited 83 countries, traveling for 2118.19 hours (88.26 days) over a total distance of 1,006,846 miles (1,620,362 km).

On October 30, 2005, Rice attended a memorial service in Montgomery, Alabama, in Rice's home state, for Rosa Parks, an inspiration for the American Civil Rights Movement. Rice stated, that she and others who grew up in Alabama during the height of Parks's activism might not have realized her impact on their lives at the time, "but I can honestly say that without Mrs. Parks, I probably would not be standing here today as secretary of state."

On October 1, 2007, Rice told children (at New York's Public School No. 154, the Harriet Tubman Learning Center) that she would not run for president, slept for 6½ hours a night and was not afraid of war zones. Asked how it felt "to be a lady with such a powerful job," she said: "Sometimes you don't feel all that powerful." Rep. Charlie Rangel, who was visiting the school with Rice, teasingly suggested Rice aim for the White House.

== Middle East ==
=== Gaza withdrawal ===
Rice worked to persuade Israel to withdraw from Palestinian territories and free up commerce and travel between the two areas. During the summer of 2005, Rice encouraged Israeli leadership to withdraw from settlements in Gaza and the West Bank. Rice spent April 2005 raising support among Arab leaders. In July, she visited the region to "help bring the weight of the United States" to the discussions. In September, Rice hailed the successful withdrawal as a victory for both Israel and Palestine, saying, "This is a historic moment for both sides, and the commitment of both sides to a successful disengagement process has been impressive." Gaza is now under Palestinian control once again. However, Palestinians complained that they were not able to travel through border crossings in and out of Gaza, which had stifled commerce.

=== Border Crossings Deal ===
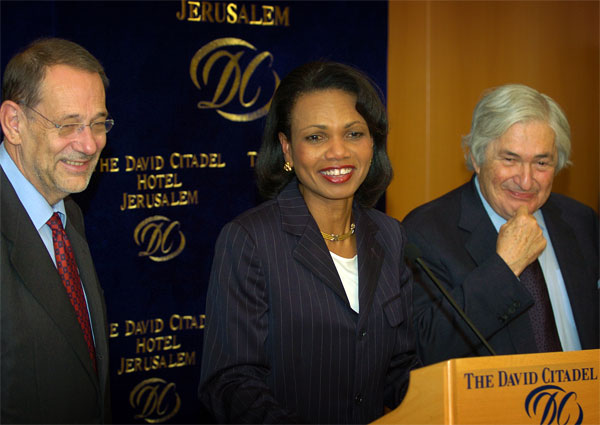
Rice announces brokering of the deal to open Gaza border crossings after a sleepless 48-hour negotiation.

In November 2005, Rice renegotiated an opening of the Gaza border crossings. Rice extended her visit to Jerusalem for a mediation session November 14, meeting alternately with Israel and Palestinian delegations. Rice negotiated differences between Israel and Palestine that included a proposed blacklist of Palestinians that had been detained by Israel and a concern that future violence would induce a renewed closure of the border crossings. By November 15, Rice announced an agreement to open Gaza's borders, with a system of transportation between Gaza and the West Bank, defining operations for transporting cargo and people across the border and allowing Gaza to reopen its international airport and begin work on a seaport. This included the Rafah border crossing, Palestine's only land link to a country other than Israel. It also included monitoring of the crossings by officials from the European Union.

Gideon Levy, reporter for an Israeli newspaper, complained Rice had accomplished little: "in what was considered the 'achievement' of the current visit, Israel also promised to open the Karni crossing. Karni will be open, one can assume, only slightly more than the 'safe passage,' which never opened following the previous futile visit."

=== Israeli-Palestinian conflict ===
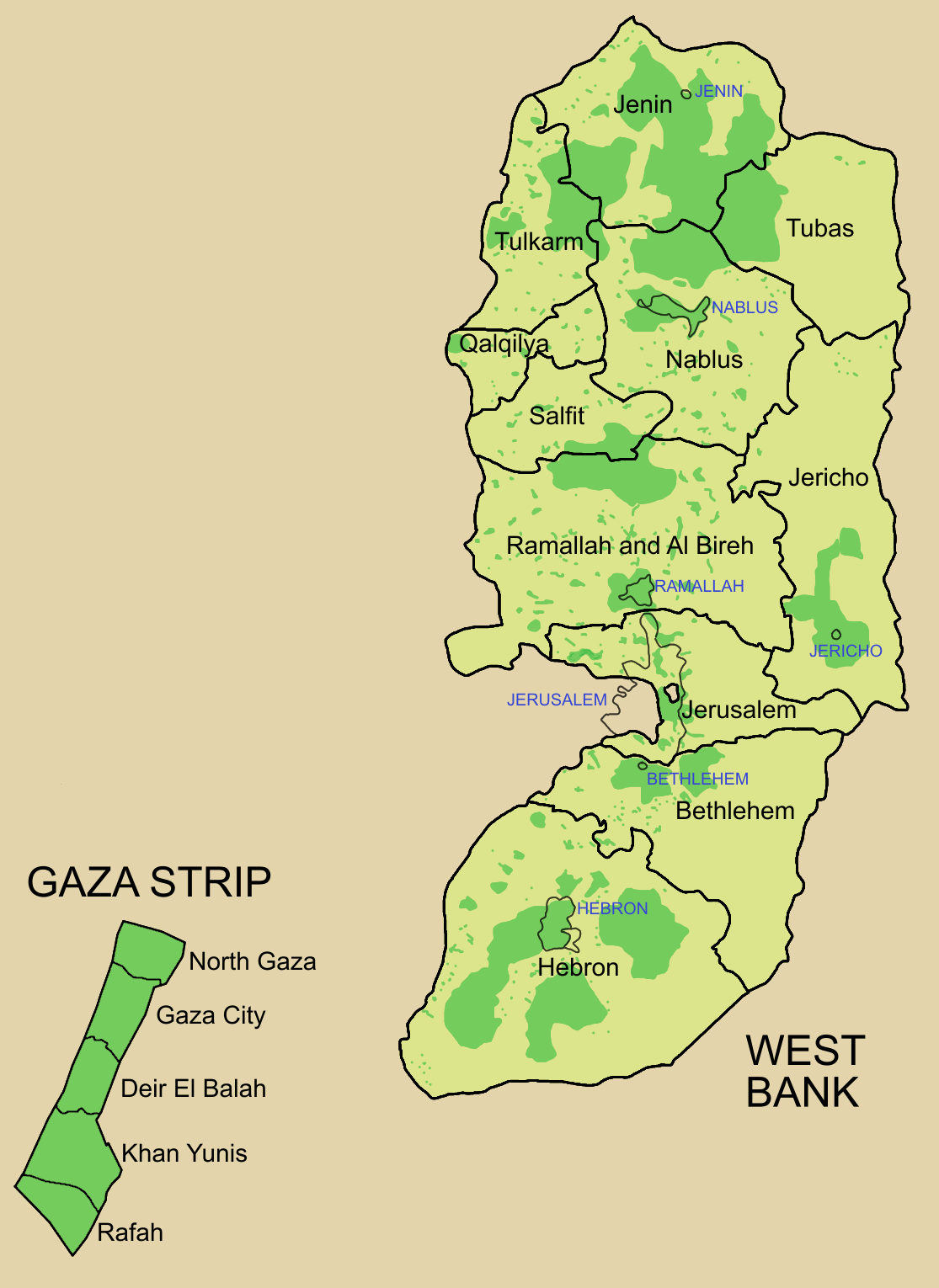
Map showing electoral districts and areas of formal Palestinian control (green)

Rice pushed for peaceful, democratic elections in Palestine following the death of Yasser Arafat. Rice asserted that "there should be the ability of Palestinian people to participate in the elections" and claimed that democratic elections would represent "a key step in the process of building a peaceful, democratic Palestinian state." Rice, alluding to the US-labeled terrorist organization Hamas, stated that "there should be no place in the political process for groups or individuals who refuse to renounce terror and violence, recognize Israel's right to exist, and disarm," saying, "You cannot have one foot in politics and the other foot in terror." However she said that holding the elections had been the right choice, even after Hamas' victory.

Rice persuaded Israel to allow Israeli Palestinians in East Jerusalem to vote in the Palestinian Authority elections. Israel allowed Palestinians in East Jerusalem to vote in the January 25, 2006 parliamentary elections, while banning Hamas, which officially calls for Israel's destruction, from campaigning there. Rice lauded the turnout and congratulated President Abbas, while informing the victorious Hamas that it would "have to make some difficult choices," saying, "Those who win elections have an obligation to govern democratically ... It now inherits the obligations of a Palestinian government, authority, that go back now for more than a decade to recognize the right of Israel to exist, to renounce violence, to disarm militias, as is the case in the roadmap, and to find a peaceful solution in two states."

In response to the Hamas victory, Israel withheld funds belonging to the Palestinian Authority, and reinforced restrictions on movement in and out of the Gaza Strip and within the West Bank. Rice stated: "Clearly, [Hamas] cannot govern in a circumstance in which they cannot represent a responsible government before the international system." Rice told her Israeli counterpart that "the economic boycott on the Hamas-led Palestinian government is effective and in the international community will continue to maintain the boycott."

George Soros faulted Rice for refusing to deal with Hamas. "[N]o progress is possible as long as the Bush administration and the Ehud Olmert government persist in their current position of refusing to recognize a unity government that includes Hamas. The recent meeting between Condoleezza Rice, Abbas, and Olmert turned into an empty formality," said Soros. This was playing into the hands of the hard-liners in Hamas, increasing the influence of Syria and Iran, and would escalate the fighting, Soros said.

Immediately following Hamas' victory in the elections, Rice attempted to garner international support in demanding that Hamas recognize Israel's right to exist. By April, Hamas officials appeared to publicly state that they are willing to work toward recognizing Israel. Under their terms, Israel would have to fully withdraw from occupied territories, including Gaza, the West Bank, and East Jerusalem. Many saw this as a positive starting point for negotiations that would allow the "roadmap" process to continue. The statement was verified by Hamas leaders such as Mohammed Ghazal, a Hamas militia official, who stated that Hamas may be willing to amend its charter to recognize Israel, saying, "The charter is not the Quran." Ghazal went on to state that while he agreed with Hamas's positions, "we're talking now about reality, about political solutions ... The realities are different."

Rice stated February 21, 2008 that Hamas rocket attacks against Israel "need to stop," demanding an end to the escalating violence that has rocked the Gaza Strip and set back efforts of the United States to promote a Middle East peace deal. Rice arrived in Cairo, Egypt, March 4, 2008, in the latest diplomatic effort to revive a Middle East peace process sidetracked by violence between Israelis and Palestinians. Rice was scheduled to meet with Israeli defense minister Ehud Barak and Israeli prime minister Ehud Olmert on March 5, 2008.

In late December 2008, after Israel broke the Gaza Strip ceasefire with an incursion into the Gaza Strip, Rice kept outgoing president George W. Bush abreast of the situation. "The United States strongly condemns the repeated rocket and mortar attacks against Israel and holds Hamas responsible for breaking the cease-fire and for the renewal of violence in Gaza," Rice said in a statement. "The cease-fire should be restored immediately. The United States calls on all concerned to address the urgent humanitarian needs of the innocent people of Gaza." In early January 2009, Rice went to New York and personally negotiated United Nations Security Council Resolution 1860 supporting a ceasefire, but then abstained on its 14–0 passage. Explaining the abstention, Rice said the US wanted to first see the outcome of the Egyptian peace efforts, but allowed the resolution to go forward because it was a step in the right direction. Israeli prime minister Ehud Olmert later claimed he humiliated Rice by persuading U.S. president Bush to instruct her not to vote for it. Rice spokesman Sean McCormack has called Olmert's claims "100-percent, totally, completely not true," but on January 14, Olmert aides said the Israeli leader told the story as it happened. Olmert has also claimed that Bush broke off a speech he was giving in Philadelphia to take his call, and that the abstention embarrassed Rice.

=== 2006 Israel-Lebanon conflict ===
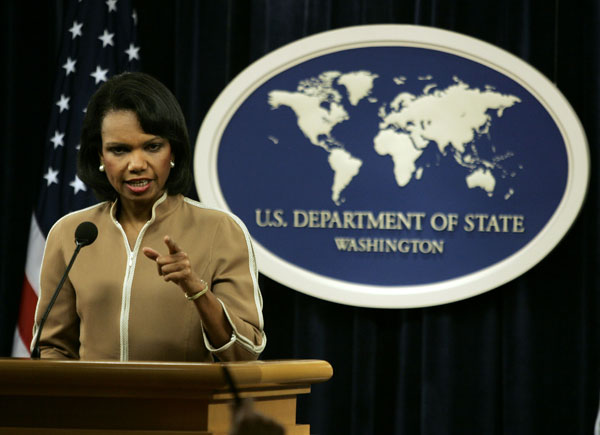
Rice delivers a special briefing on Middle East Peace in the State Department Briefing Room, July 21, 2006.

In mid-July 2006, the Middle East peace process encountered a new obstacle on a different front when Hezbollah fighters from Lebanon launched rocket attacks into Israel and ambushed Israeli convoys, kidnapping two soldiers and killing three, sparking what has become known as the 2006 Israel-Lebanon conflict. Rice immediately condemned the act, calling Hezbollah a "terrorist organization" and saying that the action "undermines regional stability and goes against the interests of both the Israeli and Lebanese people," specifically calling on Syria to "use its influence to support a positive outcome." That day, Rice was one of the first to speak directly to UN Secretary General Kofi Annan, Lebanese prime minister Fouad Siniora and Israeli foreign minister Tzipi Livni concerning the incident. Israel initiated aerial bombardments against Lebanon on July 13 and sent in land troops on July 23 to take out rocket launching sites that were shelling Northern Israeli cities, as well as to look for and recover the two kidnapped Israeli soldiers.

During the conflict, Rice supported Israel's right to defend itself from Hezbollah attacks, she repeatedly cautioned Israel to be responsible in minimizing collateral damage. Before the major fighting began, Rice demanded that both Israel and Lebanon "act with restraint to resolve this incident peacefully and to protect innocent life and civilian infrastructure." She also continued to pressure Syria to take a more active positive role throughout the crisis, accusing Syria of "sheltering the people who have been perpetrating these acts" and calling on it "to act responsibly and stop the use of its territory for these kinds of activities[,] to bring all pressure on those that it is harbouring to stop this and to return these soldiers and to allow the situation to be de-escalated."

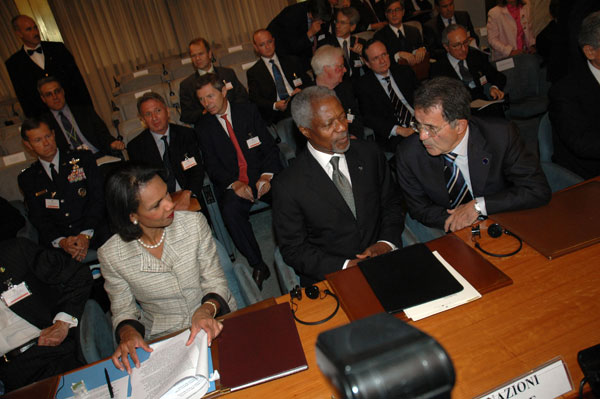
Rice, former UN Secretary General Kofi Annan, and Italian Prime Minister Romano Prodi work to lay the foundation for Resolution 1701, which ultimately imposed a ceasefire on the 2006 Israel-Lebanon conflict.

When Rice arrived in the Middle East in July 2006, one of her first moves was an unannounced visit to Lebanese Prime Minister Siniora to praise Siniora's "courage and steadfastness" and show US support for the Lebanese people. Rice stated that the conflict was part of "the birth pangs of a new Middle East," stating that Israel, Lebanon, and the international community had to "be certain that we're pushing forward to the new Middle East not going back to the old one."

At a time when progress appeared possible in the region, the Israeli military launched an airstrike on a suspected Hezbollah hideout in Qana, Lebanon, that killed 20–60 civilians. The airstrike seemed to sour support for Israel's endeavor and Lebanon cancelled a visit by Rice as a result. While the tragedy was a setback in the negotiation process, it seemed to be a turning point for Israel, who, afterward, began taking a path toward a cease-fire. Before Rice left the region on July 27, she was able to negotiate a 48-hour halt on Israeli air-raids.

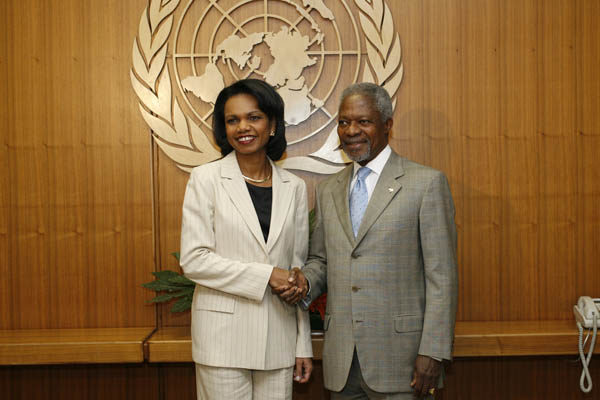
Rice appears with former UN Secretary General Annan to announce the successful passage of Resolution 1701, which imposed a ceasefire on the 2006 Israel-Lebanon conflict.

Rice returned to the Middle East on July 29, when the outlines of the ceasefire to come began to take shape. Rice demanded that the global community do what it could to ensure that the Mideast region would never again return to the "status quo ante." Rice saw the situation as an opportunity to create a new environment in which Israel and Lebanon could live in peace, and in which Lebanon could have full control over all its territories without Hezbollah acting as a "state within a state," being able to launch terrorist attacks on Israel. Building on the two resolutions that came out of the G8 summit and the steps that had been taken at the conference in Rome, Italy in late July, Rice worked with other leaders at the United Nations to pass UN Security Council Resolution 1701 on August 11, 2006, which sought to resolve the crisis. The ceasefire went into effect on August 14. The ceasefire that Rice helped broker provided for a full cessation of hostilities, a Lebanese-led international force to take the place of the Israeli forces, the disarmament of Hezbollah, full control of the Lebanese government to Lebanon, and an absence of paramilitary forces (including and implying Hezbollah) south of the Litani River; it also emphasizes the need for the immediate release of the two kidnapped Israeli soldiers. Rice lauded the outcome and expressed pleasure that the hostilities in the area had been brought to an end. Though there were sporadic, but small, spurts of violence after the ceasefire took effect, it has ultimately sustained, while international peacekeeping forces began to replace Israeli forces. On October 2, 2006, the last Israeli forces were withdrawn, allowing the UN and the Lebanese military to take over.

She had a 30-minute meeting with Walid Muallem, her Syrian counterpart on May 3, 2007—the first such talks at this level since 2005.

== Egypt ==
In February 2005, Rice abruptly postponed a visit to Egypt, reflecting displeasure at the jailing of a leading opposition figure, Ayman Nour. Nour, head of the liberal Tomorrow Party, was reported to have been brutally interrogated. Nour was freed by Egyptian authorities in March 2005, and began a campaign for the Egyptian presidency.

In June 2005, Rice addressed democracy in the Middle East at the American University in Cairo. She stated: "There are those who say that democracy leads to chaos, or conflict, or terror. In fact, the opposite is true. ... Ladies and Gentlemen: Across the Middle East today, millions of citizens are voicing their aspirations for liberty and for democracy ... demanding freedom for themselves and democracy for their countries. To these courageous men and women, I say today: All free nations will stand with you as you secure the blessings of your own liberty"

Nour finished second in Egypt's presidential race, held in 2005. In December 2005, Egypt imprisoned Nour on forgery charges that were disputed by human-rights groups. In February 2006, Rice visited Hosni Mubarak yet never spoke Nour's name publicly. When asked about him at a news conference, she referred to his situation as one of Egypt's setbacks. Days later, Mubarak told a government newspaper that Rice "didn't bring up difficult issues or ask to change anything." Mohammed Habib, an Egyptian Brotherhood official, stated: "Hamas's victory made the U.S. take a contrary position to promoting democracy in Egypt and favor a hereditary succession."

In 2005, Egypt acknowledged that the US had transferred 60 detainees to Egypt as part of the war on terror. In 2007, Amnesty International reported that Egypt had become an international center for interrogation and torture for other countries.

The second largest recipient of US Foreign Aid is Egypt, with $1.8 billion scheduled for fiscal 2006. Edward Walker, former ambassador to Egypt noted "Aid offers an easy way out for Egypt to avoid reform. They use the money to support antiquated programs and to resist reforms."

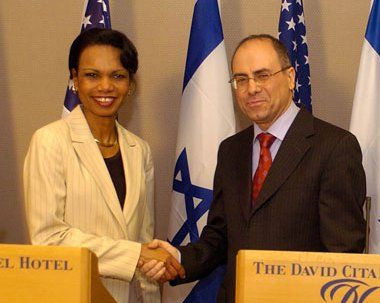
Rice shakes hands with former Israeli foreign minister Silvan Shalom in a July 2005 visit to Israel.

Rice has worked in the Middle East, including Israel, the Palestinian territories, and its immediate neighbors, especially Lebanon. Rice has supported Israel, defended Israel's right to protect itself, and promoted the "road map for peace," which includes the establishment of a sovereign Palestinian state. On August 29, 2006, she stated that the Middle East "should be a Middle East in which there is a Palestinian state in which Palestinians can have their own aspirations met, one that is not corrupt, one that is democratic, [and] one in which there is only one authority."

== Saudi Arabia ==
In May 2005, Rice indicated that many Mid East states would "have to answer their people's call for genuine reform. " She said "[a]nd even Saudi Arabia has held multiple elections." In April 2007, The New York Times reported that "more than half the decisions made by the councils have not been carried out. Most of the others have been in support of the central government."

In November 2005, the State Department issued a report critical of restrictions on religion in Saudi Arabia, noting among other things that all citizens were required to be Muslims. Rice has not sanctioned Saudi Arabia, saying she wants "additional time for a continuation of discussions leading to progress on important religious freedom issues." Criticisms in the report include a 2002 incident in which Saudi religious police stopped students from leaving a burning building because they were not wearing mandated Islamic dress; 15 schoolgirls perished.

== Iran ==
Though the US does not hold formal diplomatic relations with Iran, Rice was quite entrenched in issues pertaining to Iran, especially in regards to its democratic progress and humanitarian record, Iranian President Mahmoud Ahmadinejad's threatening statements toward Israel, and its pursuit of nuclear technology.

Rice criticized Iran's human rights record and democratic principles. On February 3, 2005, Rice said the Iranian regime's treatment of its people is "something to be loathed." She also stated: "I don't think anybody thinks that the unelected mullahs who run that regime are a good thing for either the Iranian people or for the region."

In October 2005, Ahmadinejad stated that "Israel must be wiped off the map," to which Rice responded: "When the president of one country says that another country should be wiped off the face of the map, in violation of all of the norms of the United Nations, where they sit together as members, it has to be taken seriously." Rice then went on to name Iran as "probably the world's most important state sponsor of terrorism," whose people live "without freedom and without the prospect of freedom because an unelected few are denying them that."

In February 2006, Rice addressed the Senate Foreign Relations Committee and called for funding to aid democratic reform in Iran through television and radio broadcasting, through helping pay for Iranians to study in America, and through supporting pro-democracy groups within the country. Senator Boxer expressed concern that the administration appeared surprised when radical Islamist Mahmoud Ahmadinejad was elected president of Iran, when Iranian affiliated groups won a majority in Iraq, and when the militant Hamas won a majority. Rice said that the Bush administration should not be blamed for trouble areas and said that the burden was on Hamas to change.

In recent years, Iran has also begun to pursue nuclear technology through uranium enrichment, which has been one of the most pertinent issues that Rice has dealt with during her tenure at the State Department. Iran maintains that its nuclear program only seeks to develop the capacity for peaceful civilian nuclear power generation. Rice, along with other nations, has contended that Iran's record of sponsoring terrorism and threatening the safety of other nations, along with its defiance of its treaty obligations, of the United Nations Security Council, and of the International Atomic Energy Agency, have not proven Iran to be responsible enough to conduct uranium enrichment without outside supervision. Under Rice, the official State Department consensus on the matter is that "[t]he United States believes the Iranian people should enjoy the benefits of a truly peaceful program to use nuclear reactors to generate electric power ... [and] support[s] the Iranian people's rights to develop nuclear energy peacefully, with proper international safeguards."

On September 9, 2005, Rice declared the refusal of Iran to halt its nuclear program unacceptable and called on Russia, China and India to join in threatening United Nations sanctions, and on June 2, 2006, a committee of the five permanent members of the UN Security Council and Germany, announced their plan to convince Iran to cease its nuclear activities. Rice represented the United States in the negotiation of the diplomatic initiative.

On February 14, 2006, Iran restarted its uranium enrichment program despite calls from the international community not to do so. Iran's traditional foe, Iraq, offered no resistance because Iraq's leadership had been transformed to Shiite control. Rice responded by asserting that "[t]here is simply no peaceful rationale for the Iranian regime to resume uranium enrichment." Speaking on behalf of the United States and the European Union, Rice said they were "gravely concerned by Iran's long history of hiding sensitive nuclear activities from the IAEA, in violation of its obligations, its refusal to cooperate with the IAEA's investigation, its rejection of diplomatic initiatives offered by the EU and Russia and now its dangerous defiance of the entire international community." In May 2006, Rice came up with a new approach for dealing with Iran: direct negotiation between Iran and the United States (alongside their European allies) and the possibility for "a package of economic incentives and some kind of longer-term relationship with the United States" in exchange for the suspension of uranium enrichment within Iran. Iran responded by saying that it will "never give up its legitimate rights, so the American preconditions are just unacceptable."

On July 12, 2006, Rice, along with the foreign ministers of China, France, Germany, Russia, the United Kingdom, and the European Union, announced that, as a result of Iran's refusal to suspend their uranium enrichment program, they had agreed to seek a UN Security Council Resolution against Iran under Article 41 of Chapter VII of the UN Charter. Article 41 gives such a resolution the power to interrupt or sever Iran's economic, transportational, telecommunicative, and diplomatic relations.

Though the United States and Iran disagree on key issues, the State Department has offered aid to Iran on many different occasions. After a deadly earthquake struck the Iranian province of Lorestan in March 2005, Rice offered humanitarian aid to the country during a visit to England. Rice said her "thoughts and prayers" were with the victims.

Rice said on April 30, 2007, that she does not rule out talks with her Iranian counterpart, Foreign Minister Manouchehr Mottaki. On May 3, 2007, Rice "exchanged pleasantries" with Mottaki.

Most recently, a letter alluding to Iran which was addressed to Rice from the head of government of Puerto Rico, Aníbal Acevedo Vilá, accused the United States of having deceived the United Nations and the international community in 1953, when it succeeded in having the Commonwealth of Puerto Rico recognized as a provisional decolonized status subject to continued monitoring; Acevedo-Vila claimed that it was ironic that this is the position taken by the Government of Iran and that the Governor of Puerto Rico may soon feel forced to publicly accept Iran's claims regarding the US government's alleged-hypocritical position with regards to Puerto Rico's "colonial status".

== Iraq ==
In January 2000, Rice addressed Iraq in an article for Foreign Affairs magazine. "As history marches toward markets and democracy, some states have been left by the side of the road. Iraq is the prototype. Saddam Hussein's regime is isolated, his conventional military power has been severely weakened, his people live in poverty and terror, and he has no useful place in international politics. He is therefore determined to develop WMD. Nothing will change until Saddam is gone, so the United States must mobilize whatever resources it can, including support from his opposition, to remove him."

In August 2003, Rice encouraged rejection of "condescending voices", who say that Africans and Middle Easterners are not interested in freedom and are "culturally just not ready for freedom or they just aren't ready for freedom's responsibility." She continued: "We've heard that [blacks aren't ready] argument before, and we, more than any, as a people, should be ready to reject it. The view was wrong in 1963 in Birmingham, and it is wrong in 2003 in Baghdad and in the rest of the Middle East."

In October 2003, Rice was named to run the Iraq Stabilization Group, to "quell violence in Iraq and Afghanistan and to speed the reconstruction of both countries." "'We're trying to mobilize the entire U.S. government to support this effort' in Iraq ... Rice said at the time." But by May 2004, The Washington Post reported that the council had become virtually nonexistent, with the four leaders of the group taking new jobs and roles, though an NSC spokesman said the Stabilization Group members 'still meet regularly'." .

In August 2003, Rice compared experiences in Iraq to post-War Germany stating that "the road we traveled was very difficult. 1945 through 1947 was an especially challenging period. Germany was not immediately stable or prosperous. SS officers—called 'werewolves' — engaged in sabotage and attacked both coalition forces and those locals cooperating with them—much like today's Baathist and Fedayeen remnants." Daniel Benjamin responded, stating that in "practice, Werwolf amounted to next to nothing."

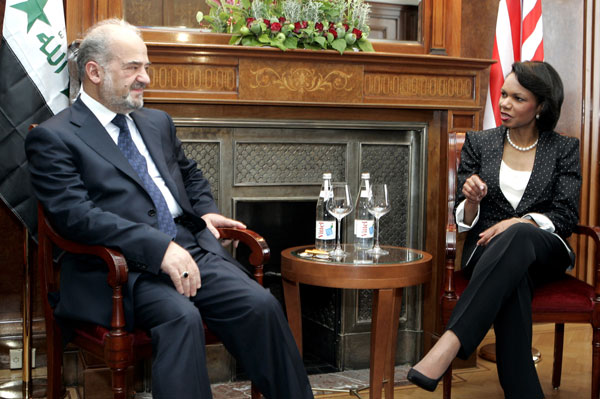
Rice meets with former Iraqi prime minister al-Jaafari in June 2005.

In June 2005, Rice stated: "And at each phase, more Iraqis are involved in this process. Sunni and Shia and Kurds and other Iraqis are concentrating politically on building a united Iraq. That is why I think the insurgency must think that its last days are eventually going to come because the Iraqis are turning to their politics to serve their future."

On September 30, 2005, Rice declared that the Iraq War was "set out to help the people of the Middle East transform their societies."

In 2005, when asked how long US troops will stay in Iraq, Rice said, "I don't want to speculate. I do know that we are making progress with what the Iraqis themselves are capable of doing. And as they are able to do certain tasks, as they are able to hold their own territory, they will not need us to do that." Rice further added, "I think that even to try and speculate on how many years from now there will be a certain number of American forces is not appropriate." Rice stated: "I have no doubt that as the Iraqi security forces get better—and they are getting better and are holding territory, and they are doing the things with minimal help—we are going to be able to bring down the level of our forces ... I have no doubt that that's going to happen in a reasonable time frame."

Rice lauded Iraq's voter turnout and peaceful transition into a sovereign government in 2005, and compared the reconstruction of Iraq to that of Europe after World War II. Rice wrote:

"Iraq ... in the face of a horrific insurgency has held historic elections, drafted and ratified a new national charter, and will go to the polls again in coming days to elect a new constitutional government. At this time last year, such unprecedented progress seemed impossible. One day it will all seem to have been inevitable. This is the nature of extraordinary times, which former secretary of state Dean Acheson understood well and described perfectly in his memoirs. 'The significance of events,' he wrote, 'was shrouded in ambiguity. We groped after interpretations of them, sometimes reversed lines of action based on earlier views, and hesitated long before grasping what now seems obvious.' When Acheson left office in 1953, he could not know the fate of the policies he helped to create. He certainly could never have predicted that nearly four decades later, war between Europe's major powers would be unthinkable, or that America and the world would be harvesting the fruits of his good decisions and managing the collapse of communism. But because leaders such as Acheson steered American statecraft with our principles when precedents for action were lacking, because they dealt with their world as it was but never believed they were powerless to change it for the better, the promise of democratic peace is now a reality in all of Europe and in much of Asia."

In 2006, Rice compared US commitment in Iraq to the Civil War, indicating "I'm sure there are people who thought it was a mistake to fight the Civil War to its end and to insist that the emancipation of slaves would hold." BET.com commented "If you're against the war in Iraq, you might as well consider yourself pro-slavery, according to Secretary of State Condoleezza Rice."

On January 11, 2007, Rice addressed the Senate Foreign Relations Committee regarding the President's Iraq Strategy. Rice asserted that insurgents were mainly responsible for American casualties; Senator Chuck Hagel stated, "Madame Secretary, your intelligence and mine is a lot different." Senator Benjamin Cardin asked Rice troop increases were adequate given the state of the Iraqi conflict. Rice responded "if you were trying to quell a civil war, you would need much larger forces" but that the augmentation was appropriate for the mission.

In January 2007, the National Intelligence Estimate was issued; key judgements included: "The Intelligence Community judges that the term civil war does not adequately capture the complexity of the conflict in Iraq, which includes extensive Shia-on-Shia violence, Al Qaeda and Sunni insurgent attacks on coalition forces, and widespread criminally motivated violence. Nonetheless, the term civil war accurately describes key elements of the Iraqi conflict, including the hardening of ethno-sectarian identities, a sea change in the character of the violence, ethno-sectarian mobilization, and population displacements."

In December 2007, Rice made her eighth visit as secretary of state to Iraq, making an unscheduled stop in Kirkuk before proceeding to Baghdad, where she called on Iraqi leaders to urgently implement a national reconciliation roadmap.

On January 15, 2008, Rice took a detour to Baghdad from a Middle East trip with President Bush, where she congratulated Iraqi leaders. She said the process of reconciliation was coming along "quite remarkably." At a news conference, she welcomed a decision to let Saddam Hussein supporters return to government jobs, saying: "A democratic and unified Iraq is here to stay. And while it may have challenges, it has passed through some very difficult times and is now moving forward in a way that is promising, yet still fragile." Rice's visit came as Iraq's defense minister told The New York Times he envisioned US security help until 2018 or later.

On April 20, 2008, Rice made yet another unannounced trip to Baghdad, this time to promote what she called the "coalescing center" of Iraqi politics around Prime Minister Nuri al-Maliki. Fighting in Baghdad's Sadr City neighborhood continued during Rice's visit, and the Green Zone endured three rocket attacks; visibility was so poor due to dust storms Rice had to take a ground convoy into the city rather than flying. Referring to Shiite cleric Muqtada al-Sadr, Rice said she recognized that the "Sadr trend" is a political movement as well as a militia. "Any Iraqi who's willing to lay down their arms and come into the political process and contest in the arena is welcome to do so," she said. "That would include the Sadrist trend."

On June 9, 2008, senators Carl Levin and John Warner, in a letter to Rice concerning U.S.-Iraqi negotiations on a strategic framework and status of forces agreement, demanded that the administration "be more transparent with Congress, with greater consultation about the progress and content of these deliberations." Levin and Warner also wrote that Congress, "in exercising its constitutional responsibilities, has legitimate concerns about the authorities, protections and understandings that might be made" in the agreements." On October 16, 2008, after several more months of negotiations, Rice and U.S. secretary of defense Robert Gates briefed senior U.S. lawmakers on the draft SOFA, and Iraqi Prime Minister Maliki prepared to circulate it with Iraq's Political National Security Council before going on to the Council of Ministers and the Iraqi parliament. Despite a compromise on the issue of jurisdiction over off-duty U.S. troops who commit crimes under Iraqi law, issues related to the timeline for U.S. withdrawal and Iraqi insistence on "absolute sovereignty" remained. On November 19, 2008, Secretaries Gates and Rice held classified briefings for U.S. lawmakers behind closed doors, and neither official commented to reporters. Democratic Representative William Delahunt said: "There has been no meaningful consultation with Congress during the negotiations of this agreement and the American people for all intents and purposes have been completely left out." And Oona Hathaway, Professor Law at the University of California at Berkeley called the lack of consultation with United States Congress unprecedented, asserting that aspects of the accord exceed the independent constitutional powers of the president of the United States.

Rice said in a late December 2008 Sunday morning talk show appearance that even in hindsight, Saddam Hussein had to go, to further stability in the Middle East: "I know that the Middle East with Saddam Hussein in its center was never going to be a Middle East that was going to change in a way that will sustain American interests and values and security." Speaking with editors and reporters of The Washington Post on January 12, 2009, Rice argued that Iraq shows signs of becoming an inclusive state—it even "declared Christmas a national holiday"—and said that if the country eventually emerges as a democratic, multiethnic state that has friendly ties with the United States, "that will be more important than what anybody thought in 2002 or 2003." Rice added: "That's not to say that it didn't come at great cost. I myself will be haunted by the lives that were lost. I will always think about the people I visited at Walter Reed or at Bethesda and wonder what their lives are like. I also know that nothing of value is won without sacrifice."

== China ==
Rice criticized the Chinese government April 3, 2008 for sentencing human rights activist Hu Jia to jail and said the United States will launch new human rights talks with Beijing.

== North Korea ==
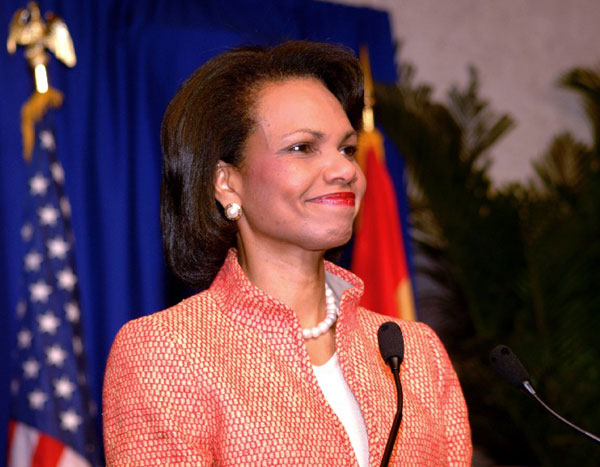
Rice, in a July, 2005 press conference, announces that North Korea has agreed to return to the Six Party Talks.

Rice has focused international attention on North Korea's nuclear weapons program. Beginning in 2003, a series of talks featuring China, North Korea, South Korea, the United States, Russia, and Japan, dubbed "The Six Party talks," have been aimed at denuclearization.

On February 10, 2005, North Korea withdrew from the talks after President Bush's 2005 State of the Union Address, in which he stated that "We're working closely with the governments in Asia to convince North Korea to abandon its nuclear ambitions". "In the next 4 years, my administration will continue to build the coalitions that will defeat the dangers of our time" North Korea complained that the United States harbored a "hostile policy" toward their country and stated that they were permanently withdrawing from the Six-party talks. In the following months, there was uncertainty over whether Rice could convince Kim Jong-Il to re-enter the negotiations, but in July 2005, North Korea announced that they had been convinced to return to the discussion.

After the first phase of the 5th round of talks, which took place November 9–11, 2005, North Korea suspended its participations in the negotiations because the United States would not unfreeze some of its financial assets in a Macau bank. Rice has consistently called for the regime to return to the talks. On May 1, 2006, Rice stated that North Korea needs "to return expeditiously to the talks without preconditions, to dismantle its nuclear programs in a complete, verifiable and irreversible manner, and to cease all illicit and proliferation activities."

On June 19, 2006, matters with North Korea were further complicated when it finished fueling an intercontinental ballistic missile that the regime said it would test fire. North Korea had previously self-imposed a missile-firing moratorium, but threatened to launch the missile anyway. Rice stated that "it would be a very serious matter and indeed a provocative act" for the North to follow through on the act, and that if the North decided to do so, "it would be taken with utmost seriousness."

On July 5, 2006, North Korea test-fired seven rockets, including the infamous Taepodong-2, sparking international backlash. Rice, in a press conference held on the same day, stated that she couldn't even begin to try to judge what motivated the North Koreans to act in such a way. Rice felt that North Korea had "miscalculated that the international community would remain united [in their opposition to the missile test-firing]" and "whatever they thought they were doing, they've gotten a very strong reaction from the international community." Following the missile test, the United Nations Security Council held an emergency meeting and strongly condemned the actions, though no official sanctions resulted at the time.

Then, in early October 2006, North Korea claimed that it was preparing to test a nuclear explosive device. While the rumors could not be substantiated by satellite surveillance beforehand, the test was actually carried out on October 9, 2006, with only twenty minutes warning. The nuclear detonation test was, purportedly, in response to the United States's decision to not hold direct bilateral talks with the regime, as well as America's increasing pressure on the government, which North Korea claims is evidence that the United States wishes to attack or invade their country. Rice disputes North Korea's claim that the nuclear test was committed to deter America from invading, saying, "We shouldn't even allow them such an excuse ... It's just not the case ... [T]here is no intention to invade or attack them. [T]hey have that guarantee."

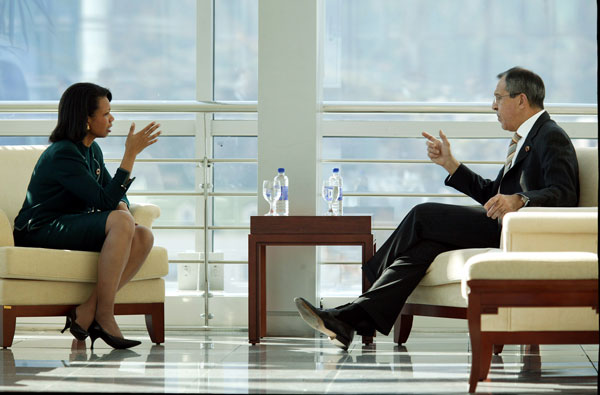
Rice meets with Russian foreign minister Sergei Lavrov in Busan, South Korea to discuss North Korea.

Rice has also repeatedly offered direct negotiations with North Korea in the context of the Six Party Talks, but she has held her ground in her decision not to hold bilateral talks with the dictatorship, stating, "We've been through bilateral talks with the North Koreans in the 1994 agreed framework. It didn't hold ... The North Koreans cheated [by] pursuing another path to a nuclear weapon, the so-called 'highly enriched uranium' path ... [I]f [Kim Jong-Il] wants a bilateral deal, it's because he doesn't want to face the pressure of other states [nearer to him] that have leverage. It's not because he wants a bilateral deal with the United States. He doesn't want to face the leverage of China or South Korea or others."

Following the nuclear test, Rice made numerous calls to foreign leaders to consolidate support for taking punitive action against North Korea. Rice was able to draw condemnations from even some of North Korea's closest defenders, including China, who admitted the test was "flagrant" and "brazen." On the same day as the nuclear detonation, the United Nations Security Council convened another emergency meeting, where a clear consensus was apparent in favor of sanctions against the regime, with even China saying that it supported punishing the regime, changing its position from July, 2006, when it vetoed any sanctions on North Korea following its missile tests. On October 14, 2006, Rice worked with allies to pass a UN Security Council resolution against North Korea that demanded North Korea destroy all of its nuclear weapons, imposed a ban on tanks, warships, combat aircraft and missiles in the country, imposed an embargo on some luxury items that government officials enjoy while the general populace starves, froze some of the country's weapons-related financial assets, and allows for inspections of North Korean cargo. Rice called the resolution "the toughest sanctions on North Korea that have ever been imposed" and hailed the unanimous passage of the sanctions, which even North Korean–friendly China supported.

But Nobel Laureate and cold-war nuclear strategist Thomas Schelling criticized Rice for organizing a punitive response, when she should have encouraged Taiwan, South Korea and Japan to reaffirm the Nuclear Nonproliferation Treaty.

While Rice consistently affirms that the United States will not preemptively invade, attack, or topple the North Korean regime, she emphatically assured Japan during an October 18, 2006, visit that "the United States has the will and the capability to meet the full range—and I underscore full range—of its deterrent and security commitments to Japan," which many have interpreted to mean that America would not hesitate to use its military might should North Korea attack one of America's allies.

In mid-June 2008, Rice defended U.S. diplomacy toward North Korea, saying an agreement earlier in 2008 for Pyongyang to disable its nuclear reactor and provide a full accounting of its plutonium stockpile, "acknowledge" concerns about its proliferation activities and its uranium enrichment activity, and continue cooperation with a verification process to ensure no further activities are taking place, made Asia and the U.S. safer.

Speaking at The Heritage Foundation, a conservative Washington, D.C.-based think tank, Rice said, "North Korea will soon give its declaration of nuclear programs to China." In a mid-January 2009 interview, Rice made the case that the Bush administration has made unappreciated strides in eliminating that country's nuclear weapon programs. Rice argued that events turned out for the best. "Yes, it's unfortunate that they reprocessed in that period of time, creating some stockpile of plutonium, but, frankly, given the attention now on their program ... I think it is a very good development" because, she said, nations in the region now have joined in a diplomatic process to persuade Pyongyang to give up the weapons it built.."

== Japan ==
Rice expressed hope February 27, 2008 that the arrest of a U.S. Marine on suspicion of raping a 14-year-old girl on the southern Japanese island of Okinawa would not damage Washington's relations with Tokyo.

== Russia ==
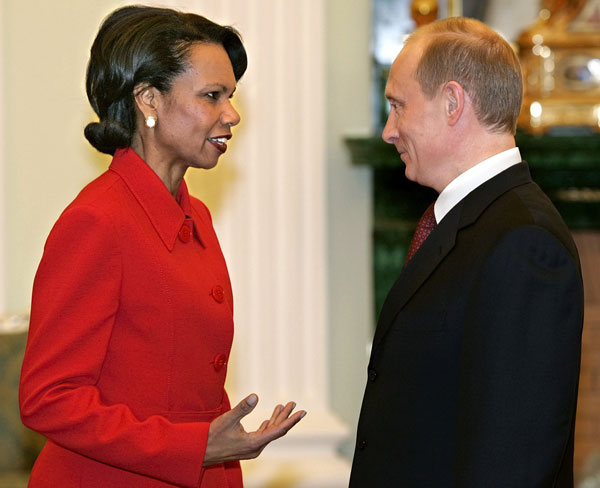
Rice speaks with Russian President Vladimir Putin during an April 2005 trip to Russia.

In April 2005, Rice went to Russia to meet President Vladimir Putin. On the plane trip over, she related comments critical of Russia's democratic progress to reporters. "Trends have not been positive on the democratic side," said Rice. "There have been some setbacks, but I do still think there is a considerable amount of individual freedom in Russia, which is important." In person Rice told Putin: "We see Russia as a partner in solving regional issues, like the Balkans or the Middle East."

In late 2005, there was a dispute between Russia and Ukraine after Russia decided to quadruple the price of energy being provided to the Ukrainian market (Ukraine was receiving heavily subsidized prices for gas from Russia, the increase would have made the price equal to that of the current market price). Rice subsequently criticised Russia's actions, accusing Russia of using its gas wealth as a political weapon. She called on Russia to behave as a responsible energy supplier and stated that the act did not show the international community "that it is now prepared to act ... as an energy supplier in a responsible way." Rice insisted, "When you say you want to be a part of the international economy and you want to be a responsible actor in the international economy, then you play by its rules ... I think that kind of behavior is going to continue to draw comment about the distance between Russian behavior and something like this and what would be expected of a responsible member of the G8."

Though there was some question over whether or not Rice could convince Russia not to block the United States's move to refer Iran to the United Nations Security Council in early 2006 (because of Russia's economic and diplomatic ties to Iran), Russian Foreign Minister Sergei Lavrov eventually called Rice to confirm that Russia had agreed to allow the move.

In February 2006, Rice described the United States's relationship with Russia as "very good," saying, "In general, I think we have very good relations with Russia. Probably the best relations that have been there for quite some time. We cooperate in the war on terror. We cooperate in a number of areas. Obviously we have some differences, too. But on the Iranian situation, we've actually had very good cooperation with the Russians."

In February 2007, Putin criticized US plans to expand European missile defenses. "Who needs the next step of what would be, in this case, an inevitable arms race?" Putin also characterized US military action as illegitimate, indicating "They bring us to the abyss of one conflict after another. 'Political solutions are becoming impossible. Rice soon responded ""Everybody understands that with a growing Iranian missile threat, which is quite pronounced, that there need to be ways to deal with that problem and that we are talking about long lead times to be able to have a defensive counter to offensive-missile threats" In April 2007, Rice indicated that Russia's concerns over the missile defense system were "ludicrous;" Putin responded by suggesting imposing a moratorium on an arms control treaty that NATO countries had long refused to ratify.

== India ==
Under Secretary Rice, and President George W. Bush, the long strained relationship between the United States and India, has strengthened. Even her and President Bush's critics, credit Secretary Rice, and President Bush, with stabilizing and improving the relationship between these two countries. From 2005, India and the US, negotiated about a civilian nuclear energy partnership. This deal was controversial, because India is not a signatory of the NPT, despite possessing nuclear weapons. However it was endorsed by Mohammed ElBaradei, head of the nuclear watchdog, IAEA. After overcoming domestic opposition, Prime Minister Manmohan Singh, won the 2008 Lok Sabha Vote of Confidence. The Indo-US civilian nuclear agreement, was then passed by the IAEA board of governors and by the Nuclear Suppliers Group. It was then passed with bipartisan support in the United States House of Representatives and the United States Senate, and Secretary Rice, and Foreign Minister Pranab Mukherjee, signed it in October 2008. This has been one of the more popular foreign policy initiatives of the Bush administration.

Secretary Rice was scheduled to travel to India on December 3, 2008, at the request of President Bush in the wake of the 2008 Mumbai attacks, the White House said. "Secretary Rice's visit to India is a further demonstration of the United States' commitment to stand in solidarity with the people of India as we all work together to hold these extremists accountable," White House spokeswoman Dana Perino said in a statement. Arriving in New Delhi to deter Indian officials from a rash response, Rice told reporters: "I have said that Pakistan needs to act with resolve and urgency to cooperate fully and transparently ... That message has been delivered and will be delivered to Pakistan.".

== Equatorial Guinea ==
Rice has worked to support and expand relations with the oil-rich African nation. In April 2006, Rice welcomed dictator-President Obiang to a press conference and stated, "You are a good friend and we welcome you." The welcome was extended 35 days after the State Department issued a report noting instances of "torture, arbitrary arrest, judicial corruption, child labor, forced labor, and 'severe restrictions' on freedoms of speech and press."

== Kenya ==
During a six-day tour of the African continent in February 2008, President Bush directed Rice, who was with him, to break off to go to Kenya, where Kofi Annan, the former United Nations secretary general, was trying to broker a power-sharing deal. A senior administration official said that the main purpose of Rice's trip would be to step up pressure on Kenya's president, warning him that he risked losing American support if he did not compromise. The message, the official said, was, "If you can't make a deal, you're not going to have good relations."

== Malaysia ==
At the sidelines of the ASEAN regional forum in Singapore, Secretary of State Rice reiterated the U.S. view that transparency and rule of law must be followed in Anwar's case. Anwar Ibrahim, a former deputy premier and current opposition leader, faces an allegation that he engaged in a homosexual act with a former aide that could derail his political plans. He has not been charged with sodomy, a crime punishable by up to 20 years imprisonment in Malaysia. But the claim mirrors events in 1998, when his rise was halted by a jail term for sodomy and corruption.

She said the United States had long spoken out in cases deemed to be political in nature and would continue to do so. "We are always going to speak up on human rights cases, political cases, but again we do so in a spirit of respect for Malaysia," Rice told a news briefing.

== Venezuela ==
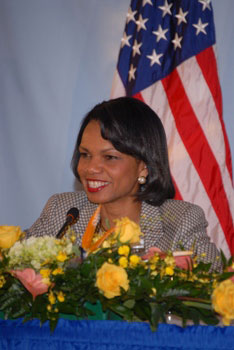
Rice discusses American-Venezuelan relations at the CARICOM Ministerials in March 2006.

The Bush administration has been particularly critical of the leadership of Venezuelan President Hugo Chávez, and brands the country an "outlaw country in the drug war." During Rice's confirmation hearings, she commented on Chávez: "We are very concerned about a democratically elected leader who governs in an illiberal way, and some of the steps he's taken against the media, against the opposition, I think are really very deeply troubling."

Venezuela actively campaigned for a non-permanent seat in the 2006 United Nations Security Council election. Rice, however, directed a global lobbying campaign by US envoys in foreign capitals, contending that Venezuela did not belong on the Security Council. On November 1, after 47 rounds of deadlocked voting, Panama was selected as a compromise.

On February 7, 2007, Ms. Rice declared that she believed Venezuelan President Hugo Chávez "was destroying his country economically and politically". to which Chávez later replied that Rice "is an illiterate in need of a husband".

== Pakistan ==
When President Pervez Musharaff imposed a state of emergency in November 2007, it was rumored that she called General Musharaff and asked him not to impose a state of emergency. For the time being the General listened to the advice. However, on November 3, 2007, General Musharaff imposed a state of emergency despite opposition from Rice.

In the aftermath of the defeat of Musharaff's own PML-Q in the election of February 18, 2008, Rice stated the US position saying that "How they arrange their coalition is really a Pakistani affair. The President of Pakistan is Pervez Musharraf ... And so, of course, we will deal with him. We will continue to pursue the American interests, which are for a stable and democratic Pakistan."

Secretary Rice on December 1, 2008, urged Pakistan to give its "absolute, total" cooperation in finding those responsible for the previous week's attacks in Mumbai, India. Rice then visited Islamabad on December 4, saying Pakistan "understands its responsibilities" in responding to terrorism in the wake of the attacks, and that the sophisticated nature of the attacks underscored the need for a swift and thorough investigation. "That means there is urgency to getting to the bottom of it," she said, "... to bringing the perpetrators to justice, and there is urgency to using the information to disrupt and prevent further attacks." Rice told reporters she was "quite satisfied" with her talks with senior government and military officials, but a senior Pakistani official said the tone was tougher in private, with Rice emphasizing U.S. expectations that Pakistan aggressively pursue evidence against militant groups.

== Zimbabwe ==
Rice has been tough on Zimbabwe, calling Zimbabwe President Robert Mugabe "a disgrace to the people of Zimbabwe and a disgrace to southern Africa and to the continent of Africa as a whole." She has also accused Mugabe of taking a country that was once considered the jewel of Africa and "turning it into a failed state that threatens not only the lives of Zimbabweans but the security and stability of all southern Africa." Reflecting on her tenure in early December 2008, Rice said one of her greatest regrets was the inability of the international community to remove Mugabe, whom she emphasized should have been removed long ago.
