= Suggestion box =

Feedback collection method

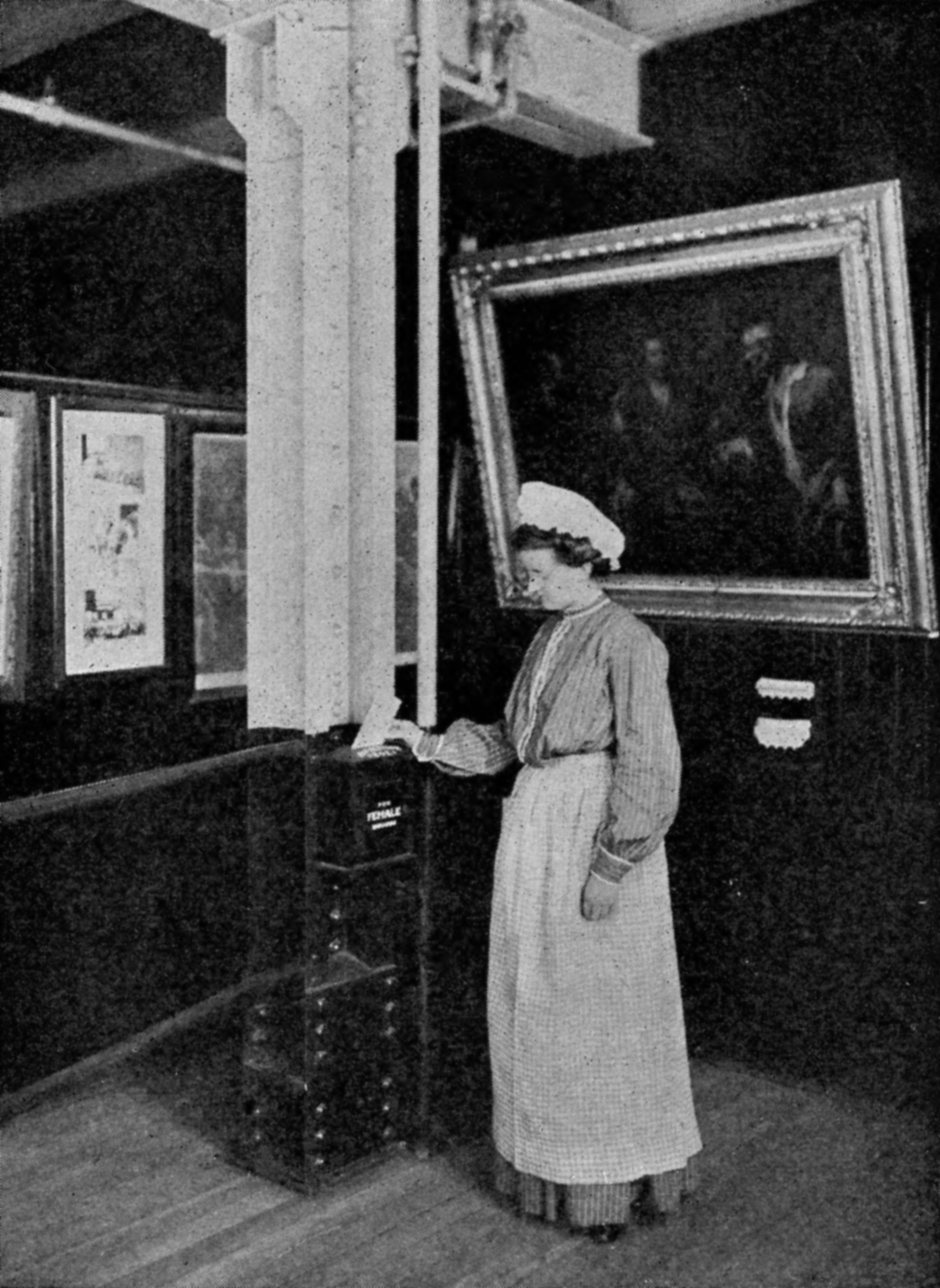
A woman placing a slip of paper into a suggestion box

The suggestion box is used for collecting slips of paper with input from customers and patrons of a particular organization. Suggestion boxes may also exist internally, within an organization, such as means for garnering employee opinion.

== History ==
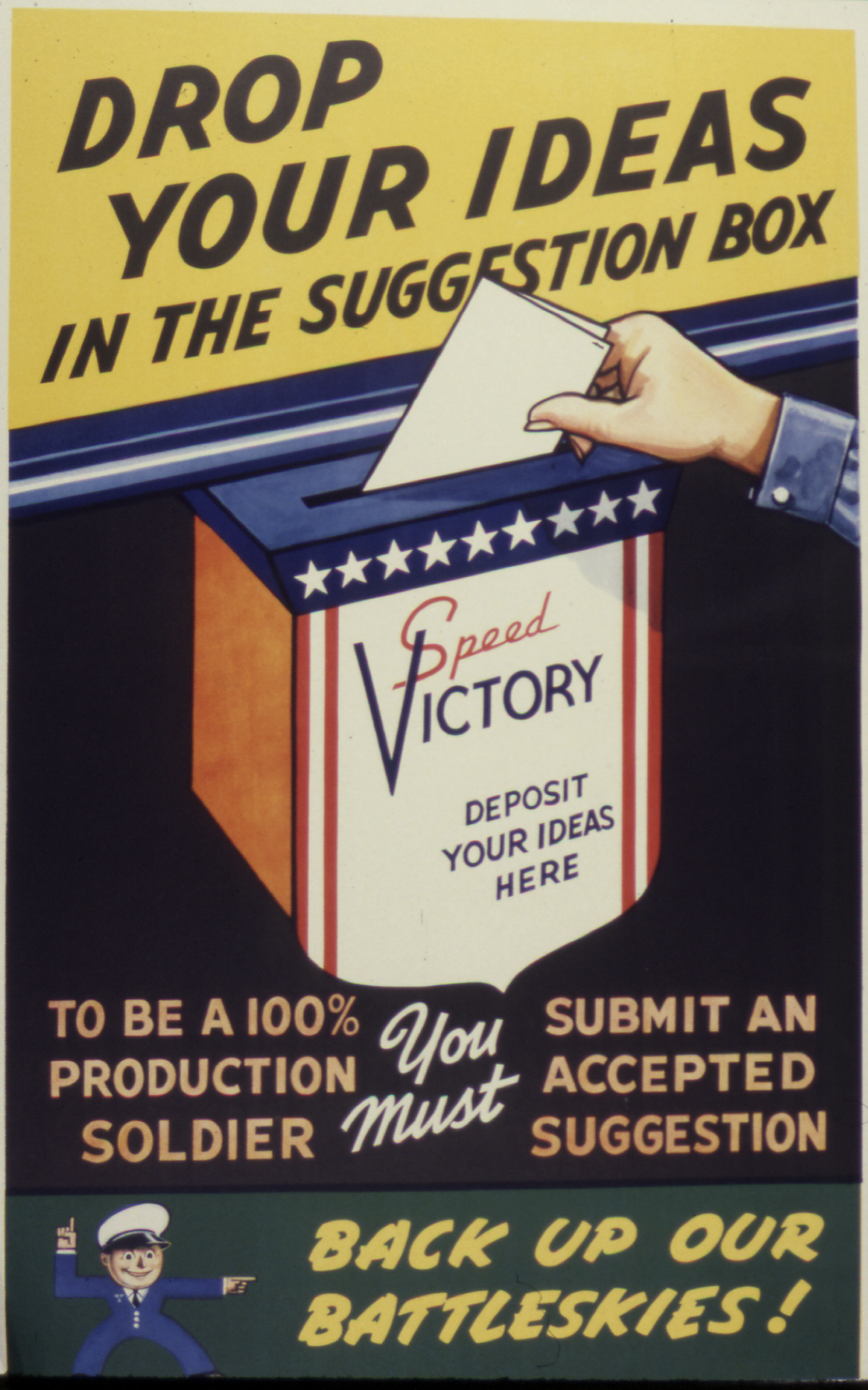
"Drop Your Ideas in the Suggestion Box" (US propaganda poster during World War II)

Daniel W. Voorhees, a U.S Senator from Indiana first introduced the suggestion box in 1890. Voorhees referred to this box as "The Petition Box". Just like the suggestion box this provided a space for Americans to offer their feedback. The photo on the left depicts the suggestion box used during World War II in the 1940s. The federal government encouraged factory workers to leave suggestions on how to increase efficiency and productivity. Throughout the years variations of this method included paper feedback forms which can be sent via postal mail, such as the "We value your input" or "How was the service today?" cards found in some restaurants; solicitations to provide comments over the telephone, such as a voluntary survey at the end of a transaction with a call center, or even an invitation on a printed store receipt to call and complete a customer satisfaction survey (sometimes offered with a product discount); or the placement of feedback forms on an institution's website.

The suggestion box for customer comments going beyond an ordinary point of service has several benefits. Suggestion boxes provide some degree of anonymity from the person or service that a customer may be critiquing. Therefore yielding a more frank and open feedback. Anonymous feedback increases the opportunities for obtaining accurate market research data and improving customer relations.

Soon enough the ideology behind the suggestion box gained momentum and was introduced into corporate settings. Management would use the comments left in the box to assess the workplace culture. Companies since have adopted their own versions of this solicitation model to better fit their needs.

== Modern versions ==
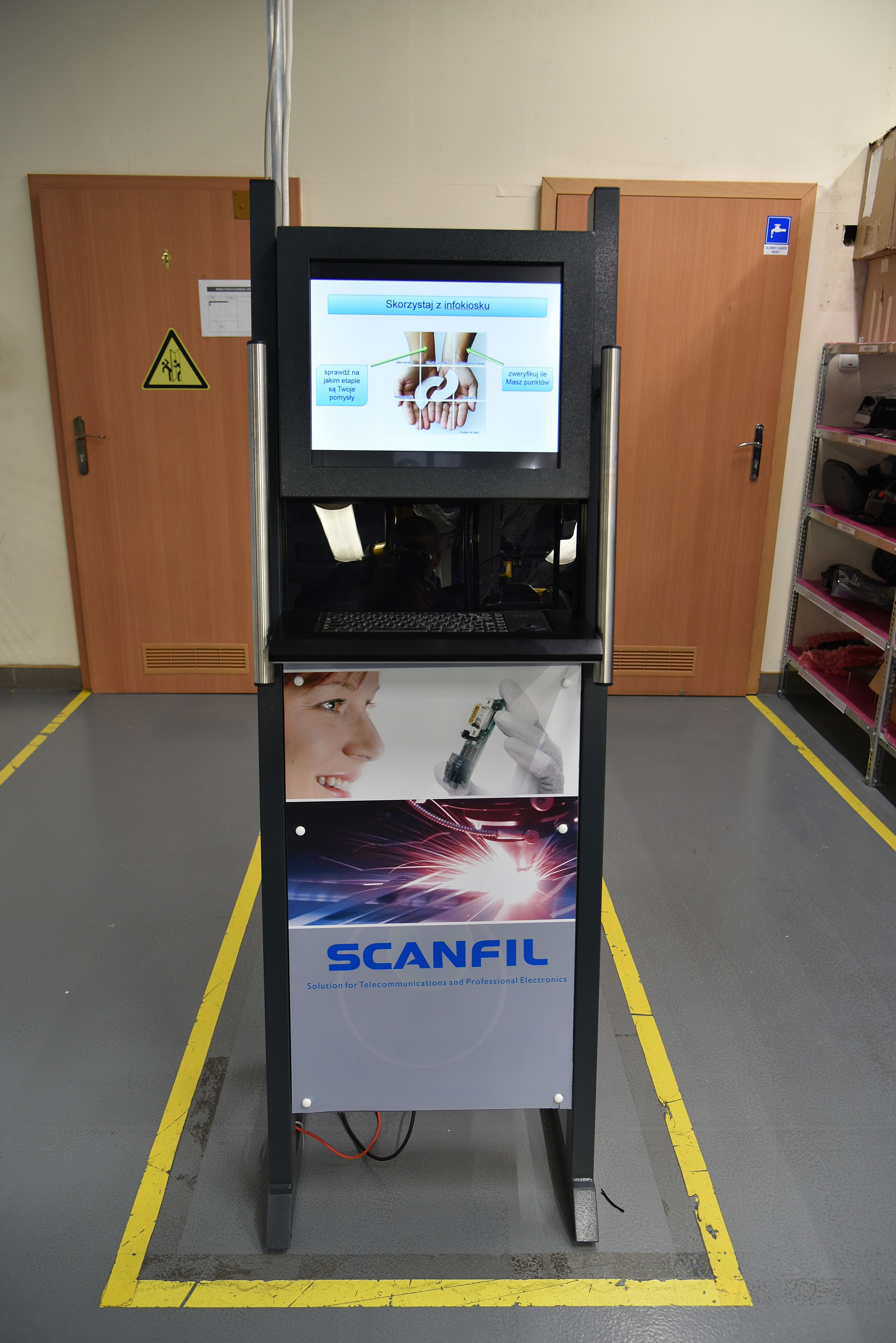
Internet suggestion box for employees in a factory

The physical box, as a post box, was replaced by an electronic form of communication; like postal service systems was replaced, in the 2000s, by email. The traditional function, "obtaining additional comments, questions, and requests", still exist as a demand: collecting information with input from customers and patrons of a particular organization, or means for garnering employee input.

During this age of fast moving technology the physical suggestion box simply cannot keep up. In some contexts the modern suggestion box is a webpage with an anonymous form, for example an online reviews, anonymous digital feedback, employee suggestion programs, and employee review sites such as Indeed. In other contexts, it turned into a complete issue tracking system, which allows the following main features (that was impossible with the old classic suggestion boxes):

- Store the entire history suggestions in a database: each suggestion receives a "ticket number", and a detailed suggestion-form is stored;
- Allow the user and the company monitor the status on your routing: each ticket receives a status, that changes with its progress in the audition feedback or the problem-resolution.

Running a suggestion program virtually can be beneficiary regarding greater transparency, clear and direct communication, and a more effective feedback loop.

=== Employee crowdsourcing ===
Gathering employee opinions with a suggestion box can also be fruitful, especially in groupthink-prone environments and within a corporate culture that adheres to a "shoot the messenger" mentality. However, as with the use of anonymous suggestion forms from the public, allowing unsigned comments may sacrifice accountability and make the feedback system prone to abuse. Employers can also gather employee opinion by posing questions and gathering everyone's opinion anonymously through crowdsourcing. Using the employee's knowledge, crowdsourcing techniques have been known to promote "New Innovations".

Recording received suggestions in a database can help track any trends. While some systems keep suggestions private, some systems make suggestions public, allowing other people to endorse the suggestion rather than creating a similar one. This voting system allows organizers to quickly see what is most suggested. Much like suggestion box allows employees to give ideas, internal company crowdsourcing gauges employee opinions on ideas or suggestions.

== See also ==
- State Department Sounding Board
- Issue tracking system
- Post box
- Labor rights
- Corporate surveillance
