= Internship =

Period of work experience

An internship is a period of work experience offered by an organization for a limited period of time. Once confined to medical graduates, internship is used to practice for a wide range of placements in businesses, non-profit organizations, government agencies and political parties. They are typically undertaken by students and graduates looking to gain relevant skills and experience in a particular field. Employers benefit from these placements because they often recruit employees from their best interns, who have known capabilities, thus saving time and money in the long run. Internships are usually arranged by third-party organizations that recruit interns on behalf of industry groups. Rules vary from country to country about when interns should be regarded as employees. The system can be open to exploitation by unscrupulous employers.

Internships for professional careers are similar in some ways. Similar to internships, apprenticeships transition students from vocational school into the workforce. The lack of standardization and oversight leaves the term "internship" open to broad interpretation. Interns may be high school students, college and university students, or post-graduate adults. These positions may be paid or unpaid and are temporary. Many large corporations, particularly investment banks, have "insights" programs that serve as a pre-internship event numbering a day to a week, either in person or virtually.

Typically, an internship consists of an exchange of services for experience between the intern and the organization. Internships are used to determine whether the intern still has an interest in that field after real-life experience. In addition, an internship can be used to build a professional network that can assist with letters of recommendation or lead to future employment opportunities. The benefit of bringing an intern into full-time employment is that they are already familiar with the company, therefore requiring little to no training. Internships provide current college students with the ability to participate in a field of their choice, allowing them to receive hands-on learning about a particular future career and preparing them for full-time work following graduation.

== Types ==
Internships exist in a wide variety of industries and settings. An internship can be paid, unpaid, or partially paid (in the form of a stipend). Internships may be part-time or full-time and are usually flexible with students' schedules. A typical internship lasts between one and four months, but can be shorter or longer, depending on the organization involved. The act of job shadowing may also constitute interning.

- Insights: Many large corporations, particularly investment banks, have "insights" programs that serve as a pre-internship event numbering a day to a week, either in person or virtually.
- Paid internships are common in professional fields including medicine, architecture, science, engineering, law, business (especially accounting and finance), technology, and advertising. Work experience internships usually occur during the second or third year of schooling. This type of internship is to expand an intern's knowledge both in their school studies and also at the company. The intern is expected to bring ideas and knowledge from school into the company.
- Work research, virtual research (graduation) or dissertation: This is mostly done by students who are in their final year of school. With this kind of internship, a student does research for a particular company. The company can have something that they feel they need to improve, or the student can choose a topic in the company themselves. The results of the research study will be put in a report and often will have to be presented.
- Unpaid internships are typically through non-profit charities and think tanks which often have unpaid or volunteer positions. State law and state enforcement agencies may impose requirements on unpaid internship programs under Minimum Wage Act. A program must meet criteria to be properly classified as an unpaid internship. Part of this requirement is proving that the intern is the primary beneficiary of the relationship. Unpaid interns perform work that is not routine and work that company doesn't depend upon.
- Partially-paid internships is when students are paid in the form of a stipend. Stipends are typically a fixed amount of money that is paid out on a regular basis. Usually, interns that are paid with stipends are paid on a set schedule associated with the organization.
- Virtual internships are internships that are done remotely on email, phone, and web communication. This offers flexibility as physical presence isn't required. It still provides the capacity to gain job experience without the conventional requirement of being physically present in an office. Virtual interns generally have the opportunity to work at their own pace.
- International Internships are internships done in a country other than the one that the country of residence. These internships can either be in person or done remotely. Van Mol analyzed employer perspectives on study abroad versus international internships in 31 European countries, finding that employers value international internships more than international study, while Predovic, Dennis and Jones found that international internships developed cognitive skills like how new information is learned and the motivation to learn.
- Returnship are internships for experienced workers who are looking to return to the workforce after taking time away to care for parents or children.

=== Internship for a fee ===
Companies in search of interns often find and place students in mostly unpaid internships, for a fee. These companies charge students to assist with research, promising to refund the fee if no internship is found. The programs vary and aim to provide internship placements at reputable companies. Some companies may also provide controlled housing in a new city, mentorship, support, networking, weekend activities or academic credit. Some programs offer extra add-ons such as language classes, networking events, local excursions, and other academic options.

Some companies specifically fund scholarships and grants for low-income applicants. Critics of internships criticize the practice of requiring certain college credits to be obtained only through unpaid internships. Depending on the cost of the school, this is often seen as an unethical practice, as it requires students to exchange paid-for and often limited tuition credits to work an uncompensated job. Paying for academic credits is a way to ensure students complete the duration of the internship, since they can be held accountable by their academic institution. For example, a student may be awarded academic credit only after their university receives a positive review from the intern's supervisor at the sponsoring organization.

=== Secondary level work experience (UK) ===
Work experience is not currently offered on the national curriculum for students in years 10 and 11 in the United Kingdom, but is available for (3rd and 4th year in Scotland), Australia, New Zealand and the Republic of Ireland; every student who wishes to do so has a statutory right to take work experience. In 2011, however, the Wolf Review of Vocational Education proposed a significant policy change that—to reflect the fact that almost all students now stay past the age of 16—the requirement for pre-16 work experience in the UK should be removed. Work experience in this context is when students in an adult working environment more or less act as an employee, but with the emphasis on learning about the world of work. Placements are limited by safety and security restrictions, insurance cover and availability, and do not necessarily reflect eventual career choice but instead allow a broad experience of the world of work.

Most students do not get paid for work experience. However, some employers pay students, as this is considered part of their education. The duration varies according to the student's course and other personal circumstances. Most students undertake work experience for one or two weeks in a year. Some students work in a particular workplace, perhaps one or two days a week for extended periods throughout the year—either for vocational reasons and commitment to alternative curricula or because they have social or behavioral problems.

=== University level work experience (UK) ===
At university level, work experience is often offered between the second and final years of an undergraduate degree course, especially in the science, engineering and computing fields. Courses of this nature are often called sandwich courses, with the work experience year itself known as the sandwich year. During this time, the students on work placement have the opportunity to use the skills and knowledge gained in their first two years, and see how they are applied to real world problems. This offers them useful insights for their final year and prepares them for the job market once their course has finished. Some companies sponsor students in their final year at university with the promise of a job at the end of the course. This is an incentive for the student to perform well during the placement as it helps with two otherwise unwelcome stresses: the lack of money in the final year, and finding a job when the university course ends.

== See also ==
- Apprenticeships
- Cooperative education
- Curricular Practical Training (for international students)
- Experiential education
- Externship
- Sub-internship
- Fellowship
- Pathways Programs
- Postdoctoral researcher
- Practicum
- School-to-work transition
- Service-learning
- Skintern
- Take Our Daughters and Sons to Work Day
- Traineeship
