= Massive Multiplayer Online Wargame Leveraging the Internet =

2011 simulation by the U.S. government

- Developer: US Navy Office of Naval Research
- Publisher: US Navy Office of Naval Research
- Genre: MMO
- Mode: Multiplayer

Massive Multiplayer Online Wargame Leveraging the Internet (MMOWGLI) was an online multiplayer game used by the US Navy Office of Naval Research and other U.S. government agencies to perform online wargames in order to study various problems and hypothetical scenarios. The MMOWGLI Project ended in 2018 and is no longer active.

== Overview ==
MMOWGLI was launched by ONR and the Naval Postgraduate School in order to blend gaming and social media tools and to crowdsource solutions. It was initially launched with an application addressing a piracy scenario off the coast of Somalia. The idea received coverage from national news media. More than 16,000 users registered from various national security communities, academia and the general public. Round one of MMOWGLI gameplay started on May 31, 2011 with 2,000 players, and resulted in over 800 players registering and exchanging ideas.

== See also ==
- MMORPG
- Government crowdsourcing
- United States Navy
