= Richard Boly =

American diplomat

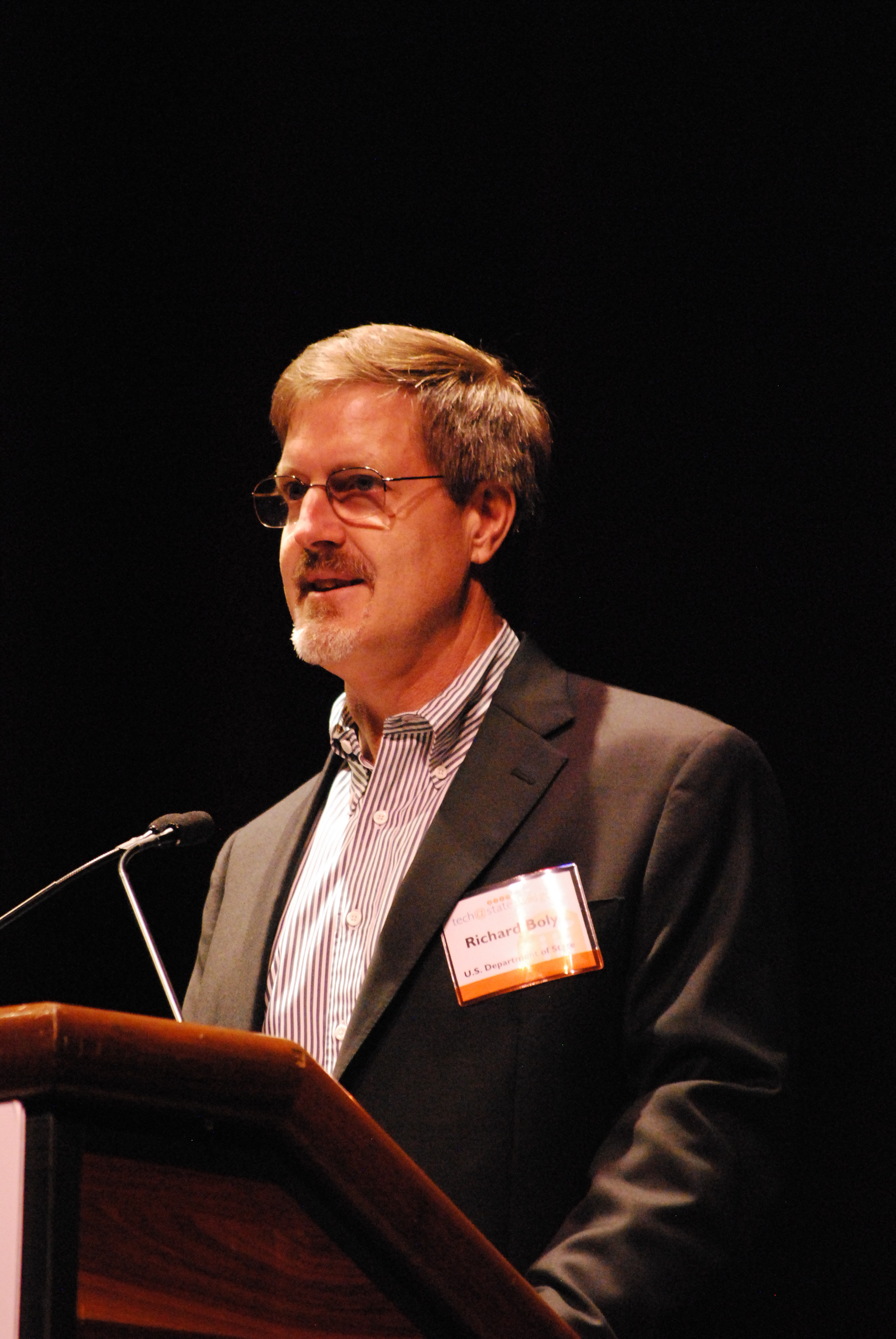
Richard Boly speaking at Wikimania 2012 in Washington, DC

Richard Boly is a former career U.S. diplomat and former Director of the Office of eDiplomacy, an applied technology think tank for the U.S. Department of State. Previously, he was a National Security Affairs Fellow at the Hoover Institution at Stanford University, where he launched the Global Entrepreneurship Program.

Representing the U.S. Department of State, he served in the U.S. Embassy, Rome, where he developed and ran a program to promote entrepreneurship in Italy. Richard Boly has also worked at U.S. Embassies in the Dominican Republic, Ecuador, and Paraguay. While working as the Embassy's economic and commercial attaché in Asunción, he leveraged modest program funds to sponsor a seminar for local judges and prosecutors to demonstrate how Paraguayan copyright law could be applied to software piracy. In his monograph "Commercial Diplomacy and the National Interest" (Business Council for International Understanding, 2004, 77–79) Harry W. Kopp details Boly's efforts to persuade Paraguayian judges and prosecutors to enforce Intellectual Property Rights (IPR) in Paraguay. Boly persuaded Paraguayan Supreme Court judges and other law enforcement officials to address bribery and corruption.

Richard Boly is the most junior diplomat to win the Cobb Award for commercial diplomacy. in 2012, he received the Security and International Affairs Medal, one of the Samuel J. Heyman Service to America Medals.

Other professional accomplishments include an assignment as the first Presidential Management Fellow with the Inter-American Foundation. Boly was a consultant with the Inter-American Development Bank.

== Entrepreneurship ==
A proponent of fostering global entrepreneurs as an element of U.S. foreign policy, Boly developed and managed a program, "Partnership for Growth", in Italy to promote entrepreneurship in Italy by expanding access to venture capital. the 1990s, Boly founded and ran a shrimp hatchery in coastal Ecuador. During service in the United States Peace Corps, Boly worked with local residents on micro-business projects.

== Change Management ==
Large organizations coalease into risk-averse environments slow to address challenges. Government agencies typically follow a course of inaction born of suspicion for change and no requirement for accountability. Leading organizational culture change requires communication, champions and resources. Managing change that sticks involves developing a common team language, shared productivity expectations and may require acceptance of interim setbacks while trending to success.

Managing a team of diverse and confident tech creators, as well as the requisite group of experienced bureaucrats, offered Boly the opportunity to apply egalitarian communication to a previously stove-piped, status-fixated information environment. By modeling change processes to staff and others, his management experiments offer a path to other government leaders in the digital era.

== Social Media Advocate ==
Using social media for 21st century diplomacy carries a certain element of risk. "It's better to launch and learn and be a bit more entrepreneurial, without worrying that the stakes are too high," says Richard Boly, State's director of eDiplomacy. During interviews, Boly advances the notion of civil society, global open government and collaboration among U.S. government agencies. Boly leads the team charged with developing the technical tools and training expertise to enable the U.S. Department of State to use professional networking platforms, blogs, wikis and image sharing, to list just a few 21st century communications tools, effective and efficient government has an opportunity to thrive. Diplomacy, the method through which governments communicate officially, is well served by new media.

In practice, changing federal government employee habits and mindsets from a "need to know, to a need to share" culture takes dedication and creativity. “it’s fundamental to what we do,” Boly says. “If you don’t collaborate and share internally, you’re never going to share externally." As Director of the U.S. State Department's Office of eDiplomacy, Boly promotes the practical advantages of using social media for collaboration as well as the underlying philosophy of government transparency through use of collaborative online platforms.

== Education ==
Boly is a graduate of Stanford University and the Graduate School of International Relations and Pacific Studies at UCSD.

== See also ==
- Office of eDiplomacy
- Diplopedia
