= Communities @ State =

Communities @ State is one of the U.S. government's internal blogs to promote inter-agency dialog.

The sites in Communities @ State combine content with conversation. They allow easy publication of information, and let readers comment on the material. The program has three goals:

1. Promote knowledge sharing within the Department;
2. Share information with other Federal agencies; and
3. Promote connections and conversation among personnel with shared professional needs and interests.

Since the program's inception in 2005, over 70 blog-based communities have been launched. As of October 2009, there are 59 active communities, and over twenty additional communities are being planned. Over the course of the last year, Communities @ State and Diplopedia have shown 90–600% growth across monitored growth criteria.

Communities at State is coordinated from the State Department's Office of eDiplomacy.

== See also ==
- Classified United States website § OpenNet
- Diplopedia
