= Skintern =

Derisive term for an intern who dresses unprofessionally

In American workplaces, "skintern" is an informal term for a summer intern, usually female, who dresses in clothing more revealing than that which is common for the field in question.

The term is a portmanteau of skin and intern. It was first widely used about such interns working in offices of members of the U.S. House of Representatives in Washington, D.C. around the mid-2000s; Advice columnist Julia Allison claims it was used in that sense as early as 2000. Since then, it has spread to other industries outside government and politics that also employ summer interns.

The phenomenon is sometimes a deliberate sartorial strategy, but more often is believed to result from ignorance of accepted professional dress standards. Older women in the offices where those interns work have often responded by advising them on how to dress more appropriately. Some feminists, however, have seen the term as yet another symptom of inherent sexism in the workplace, since it is so widely applied.

== History ==
In the mid-2000s, Washington-area media began reporting that the congressional staffers who manage the intern programs in the United States House of Representatives complained that while most of the young women showed up for work in the same conservative professional attire that the staffers and members did, some chose more revealing clothing. Chad Pegram, a coordinator of Miami University's intern program, recalls that when he took a group to lunch with one member of the state's congressional delegation, one young woman stood out by wearing "a skirt that was way too short" and flip-flops. "It reflected badly on her because everyone else looked great," he recalled. "She embarrassed herself."

Other staffers, many of whom themselves began their careers as interns, reported later that they had seen young women come in for internships wearing "gold stiletto heels, thigh-high boots [and] belly shirts" in addition to short skirts. Most male staffers did not mind, but female staffers, even those just a few years older, were often resentful and offended. The scandal in which White House intern Monica Lewinsky's sexual affair with President Bill Clinton had led to his impeachment was fresh in institutional memory, and some staffers and journalists wondered if the skimpily dressed young female interns were trying to emulate her. In 2004, Jessica Cutler, a staffer for Ohio Senator Mike DeWine, wrote for a while a blog in which she detailed an active sex life with a variety of men she met through her work, which did little to dispel that idea.

In June 2005, as another group of summer interns began their weeks on Capitol Hill, Betsy Rothstein wrote an article about the phenomenon for The Hill. "We were talking about this at dinner the other night, about how some interns show up in some of the skimpiest clothing," she quoted an unnamed female press secretary as recalling. "One of the boys called them skinterns, which I thought was hilarious."

Another term came from an unidentified "female Republican aide," who claimed she kept and shared a list of "daily offenses" such as young women wearing metallic shoes and handbags as well as wifebeaters. "If you are going to wear stilettos or heels, no complaining about how they hurt. Interns need to learn to walk in them." She continued "My favorite term is the Saturday-night intern, one who always dresses like it is a Saturday night. They are all over."

When the Washington Times covered the phenomenon a year later, it used the shorter term. "They're known as 'skinterns,'" the paper wrote. "Those who think 'belly shirts' are career wear. If the devil wears Prada, the skinterns wear nada. As if Washington wasn't sweltering enough." It reported that the popular political blog Wonkette had started a "Hill Intern Hotties Contest" for both male and female interns. The article implied that the phenomenon was no longer restricted to just congressional offices but had migrated, like many former members of Congress, to lobbying firms on K Street, where the same standards of dress often obtain.

Four years later, in 2010, The Baltimore Sun reported that private employers in its coverage area were dealing with skinterns. "Booty shorts. Thigh-grazing dresses. Flip-flops. Ripped jeans. Cleavage-baring tops. See-through skirts. Forgotten bras. Employers have seen it all—and wish they hadn't." Missy Martin, vice president of human resources at Ripken Baseball, told the Sun that interns were "showing up to work in bar clothes. Short skirts, tank tops and cleavage showing. It's like, 'Kids, do you realize you're not supposed to be dressed like you're going out to drink in Canton?'"

By the middle of the next decade, the skintern phenomenon was no longer limited to Capitol Hill. Articles advising interns on how to dress appeared on popular websites in June, when most internships start. " ... [B]efore long, the annual summer parade of skinterns will begin," wrote Katherine Goldstein, editor of Vanity Fair's website, dropping the scare quotes in a 2013 Slate piece advising young women on how to dress in offices. At her former employer, she recalled, "[e]very June there would be a new batch, just as clueless about appropriate office attire as those from the year before. Think dresses so clingy they leave nothing to the imagination, tops worn without a bra and tied together with string, daisy dukes, sheer harem pants, and cleavage straight out of a men's magazine." The following year the Kansas City Star ran a similar piece.

A 2012 blog post by GlobaLinks Abroad suggested the phenomenon had spread overseas as well. For the organization, Monika Lutz advised young women headed for internships abroad to eschew "spaghetti straps, cleavage, short skirts, backless outfits or any combination of the above" if they did not want to be remembered as skinterns. "But men are not excluded from the fashion police's searchlight," she added. "They can be seen sporting hoodies, flip flops, super baggy cargo pants, or some fresh-off-the-court sneakers, just to cite the most common occurrences." Similarly, in a 2013 piece giving dressing advice to interns in the Huffington Post, fashion journalist Lauren Rothman, while generally focused on issues specific to women, reminds those heading for Silicon Valley to "leave the hoodies and sweats to those who have already made their millions."

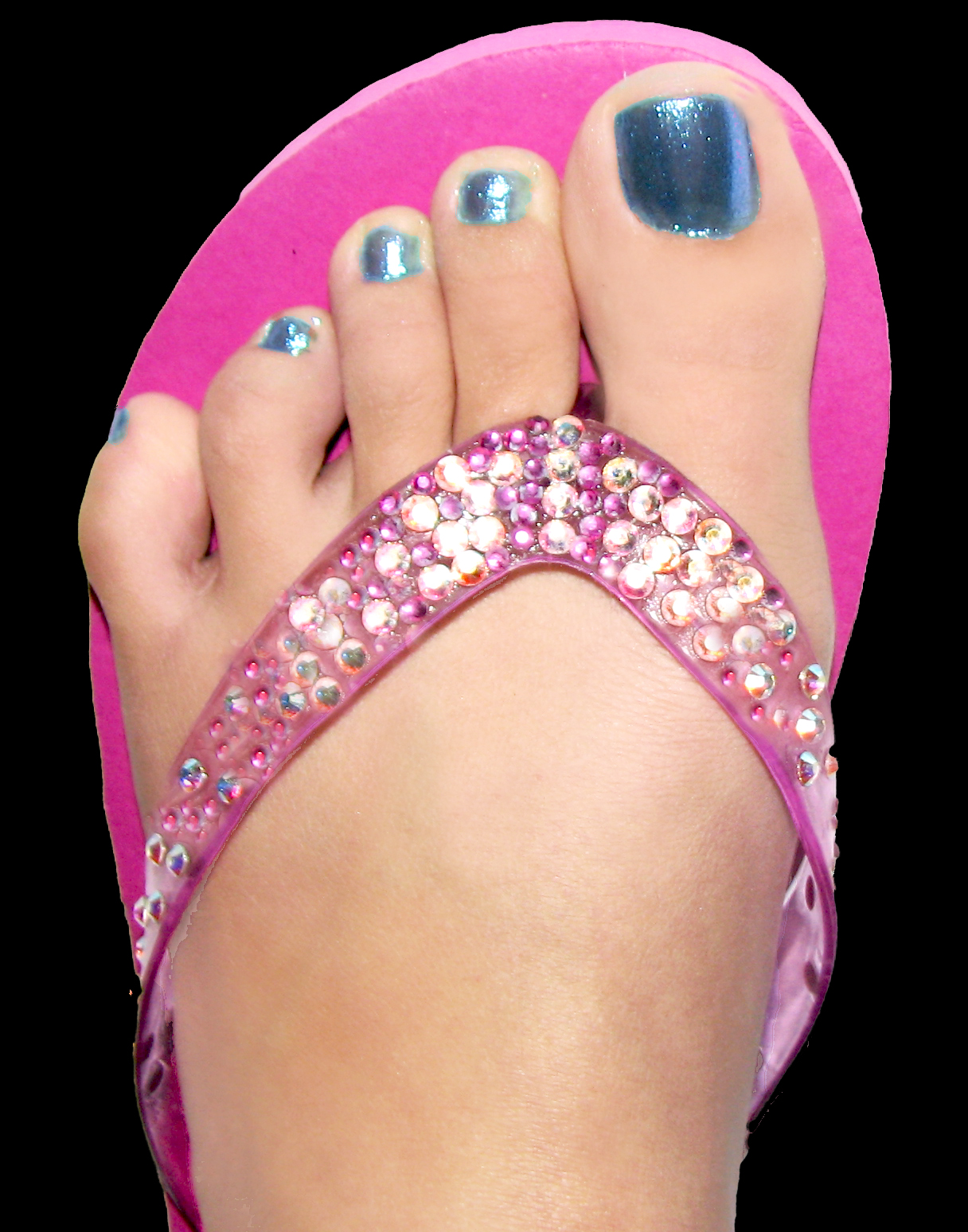
By 2014, flip-flops had mostly become accepted summer footwear in Washington offices.

On some issues, sartorial choices of skinterns became accepted for all Hill staffers. In 2014, The Washington Post reported that flip-flops had become so common in congressional office buildings during summers as to cause a noise problem for some present when the women wearing them reported for work in the morning. "It sounds like the Four Horsemen of the Apocalypse," complained Abra Belke, a former staffer and lobbyist who by then was writing Capitol Hill Style, a fashion blog. "Interns and junior staffers are just clomping down the hall in their $5 Old Navy flip-flops."

== Causes ==
Some observers think at that least some of the young women whose choices of clothing get them labeled as skinterns are doing so deliberately, in order to stand out from more conservatively dressed colleagues. "Maybe if you can get noticed, you might get a full-time position," Wonkette editor Alex Pareene told ABC News in 2006. Nicole Williams, who coaches women entering the workforce, agrees that in some cases the skintern look is exactly what the wearer intends. "You've got the summer to prove 'I can work here' or 'I can't work here,' so to get noticed, why not?" one intern told Good Morning America.

It has also been suggested that most misattired interns, male or female, are not familiar with professional dress standards, especially in an era of more relaxed standards such as those embodied by business casual. One intern who said she was from Washington state told the Washington Times in 2006 that her friends at home were stunned to hear that she was not allowed to wear jeans at her internship in the capital.

They may also misunderstand what is meant by vague instructions on how to dress. Carol Vellucci, director of the Career Center at the University of Baltimore, told The Baltimore Sun that many students seem to her to think that "dressing up" means wearing outfits they would typically wear to a nightclub or bar. "It seems to be something that especially younger students aren't quite getting," she said.

Interns may also not have the kind of established wardrobe one would expect from an older adult. "These are young men and women, and they can’t be expected to be decked out in Brooks Brothers," Anthony Weiner, then a congressman from New York, told The Hill in its 2005 story. When he himself had interned for Charles Schumer in the House during the 1970s, he recalled that he owned one suit at the time, wearing it to the office every day but with a different shirt and tie.

== Responses ==
When the word first started appearing in Congress, many staffers were cautious about counseling the skinterns in their midst on proper dress. "You have to be respectful because chances are they are a donor's kid or a friend of the lawmaker," one male staffer told Rothstein about dealing with interns in general Instead, they often used indirect means, such as marginalization. "We had a [recent] intern who we just called Belly. She walked around with a belly shirt on one time too many, and she did get into trouble. Nobody gave her work to do," recalled the press secretary who had shared the coinage of the term with Rothstein. In 2011, Washington Post reporter Jenna Johnson shared some anecdotes about the "less-than-subtle" tactics some offices had used, such as one office where the offending intern was asked not to be in the intern class's group photo for the member's website.

Sometimes more direct pressure has been used. In another incident, a young woman in overly transparent capris was made to stay seated at a desk until the congressman's wife had left the office for the day. Johnson wrote of an intern being given a tie and told to put it on. In another case the other interns staged an "intervention" during the local bar's happy hour after the workday.

In the wake of media attention to the phenomenon, many members of Congress began instituting stricter dress codes for staffers and interns. "They should dress professional, and we demand that," a spokesman for Florida Rep. Lincoln Diaz-Balart told Rothstein. "They shouldn't dress like they're working a corner. You shouldn't be dressing like Paris Hilton." A year later, Rothstein told the Washington Times the stricter attention to interns' dress was having the desired effect. "I really think the interns are getting smarter because of these programs," she said. "They're coming from college. They don't have the thought process. They're learning they can't dress like that."

Colleges have also been trying to prepare interns ahead of time. At the University of Baltimore, Vellucci teaches a course on "Personal and Professional Skills for Business" which is a requisite for business majors, The Baltimore Sun reported. Outside the city, Towson University's business school stages a "Dress Smart" program in which students themselves model attire of varying degrees of propriety.

In 2014, The Wall Street Journal reported that KPMG staged a fashion show for its interns at the beginning of every summer. At a hotel in Orlando, the accounting firm's recruiters modeled acceptable outfits from stores such as The Gap, complemented by slide presentations on acceptable and unacceptable attire in the office. The 1,200 interns in attendance also received $200 gift cards to Men's Wearhouse and (for women) Banana Republic, as well as a free silk tie and piece of jewelry respectively. The company's recruiting director admitted that the show and gifts were prompted by some past interns dressing "not in a way that we would have preferred".

== Criticism ==
"I wince every time I hear the term 'skintern'", a pseudonymous female intern complained in a 2010 post on the Feministing blog. Why, she asked, were male interns who dressed inappropriately merely labeled "sloppy", while young women who did were sexualized? "'Slutty' has a very different and much more harmful repercussion for an intern's career than 'sloppy,'" she noted. "As a result, I am sometimes paralyzed in the mornings, worried that that my sweater seat is too tight or my button down is too low cut. I know that just by being a young female intern, I could be considered a 'skintern' regardless of my dress; and, my male co-workers will never worry about being reduced to a 'skintern.'"

She also felt that it needlessly divided women who should be working together:

Furthermore, labeling someone a "skintern" or "that girl" pits aspiring young professional women against each other. Instead of focusing on how to improve our skills and abilities, we focus on how "trashy" she looks and how much "better" we look. In order for us to not be "that girl," some other "skintern" must be there. As Gloria Steinem famously said, "all women are Bunnies," every young woman on the Hill is a "skintern."

Fashion website The Gloss defended the skintern style in response to Goldstein's 2013 Slate piece. "Surely, I am not the only person who thinks that a 'skintern' sounds like a member of a really cool club," wrote Jennifer Wright. "Skinterns fear nothing. They are truly alive. The air rushes upon their skin whenever someone walks by their cubicle, but they're not chilly, they're fine ... Who would not want to be a skintern!?"

Another response to Goldstein's piece took the opposite view. Elissa Strauss asked if Goldstein's sartorial advice was sexist in a post for "The Sisterhood", The Jewish Daily Forward's blog on women's issues. At first, she granted, it might seem so: "this is set of codes and rules that only apply to young women, or more specifically, their bodies. It told them that some parts of their bodies are considered vulgar and that wearing a pair of high platform heels might give others the wrong idea about their, well, purity. It is putting the responsibility on them to cover up, instead of on men to stop gawking."

"I see the logic here," Strauss admitted, recalling how self-conscious she had felt during puberty as her body started to change, a feeling she did not see shared by any of the young men she knew. "But with all this said, I think there is still a conversation to be had with young women on how to dress, especially in a time when fashion seems almost uniformly inspired by Julia Roberts in Pretty Woman. 'I choose-my-choice' feminism sometimes leads women to empowerment, and other times leads them to choose 'choices' from a patriarchal or, worse, misogynist culture."

A young female intern wearing a miniskirt and very high heels "might be able to convince herself that these fashion choices are truly her own," Strauss wrote. "More likely, she has absorbed the many ways in which porn and strip-club culture have infiltrated mainstream culture—and what she takes for empowerment is really rooted in the commodification and degradation of female sexuality. Somebody needs to tell her this. They also need to tell her that it is way easier to walk in flats."

== See also ==
- Dress for Success, 1970s bestseller about ideal attire in a professional setting
