= Virtual internship =

A virtual internship is a work experience program where the participant (intern) gains experience while working in a remote professional setting and is not physically present at the job location.

Virtual interns communicate with their employer online through various means including email, Skype, WhatsApp, instant messaging, phone conversations, webinars, project management tools, SMS messaging, etc.

Virtual internships are undertaken by both students and graduates, usually some form of white-collar work, often within fields suitable to remote work such as information technology, media, creative arts, or public relations.

According to career experts, although virtual internships are currently rare, they are growing in popularity due to improving technology and the growth of social media. A rise has been reported in virtual internships — most of which are unpaid — especially from small ventures and start ups seeking additional help. Larger companies are also starting to explore offering these types of internships. They are presently most popular among small to midsize companies and online businesses.

Virtual internships have been criticized for not providing the supervision and guidance that internships are meant to provide. Despite this, virtual or remote internships are a viable option amidst the COVID-19 pandemic, where travel options are limited. They may rival and sometimes exceed what traditional internships offer.

== Expertise ==
The most common virtual internships include information technology, software development, marketing, social media, research, writing, journalism, media, pre- and post-event planning, video creation and editing, human resources, graphic design, search engine optimization and marketing, non-profits and government internships, political internships, engineering internships, and public relations internships. Students who do internships online underestimate their contributions when employers rate them as valuable.

== Programs ==
=== Africa ===
The West African Academy of Public Health operates a virtual internship program with mentoring cascade for recent graduates interested in working in global health. The "WAAPH VIP" as it is called, engages youths in health information advocacy to expand their health information literacy, core leadership skills and community engagement capacity to work in public health issues.

=== North America ===
The United States Department of State operates the Virtual Student Foreign Service program. As of 2012, 343 virtual interns have worked with US diplomatic posts in 97 countries.

=== Europe ===
Preaсtum is the first company in Russia to do a virtual internship Currently, they have launched a program to train retail business managers for Otkritie FC Bank and an introduction to the various departments of Russian Post. Also, a virtual internship for Rosneft will be launched in 2021.
