= Transformational Diplomacy =

Diplomacy initiative by Condoleezza Rice

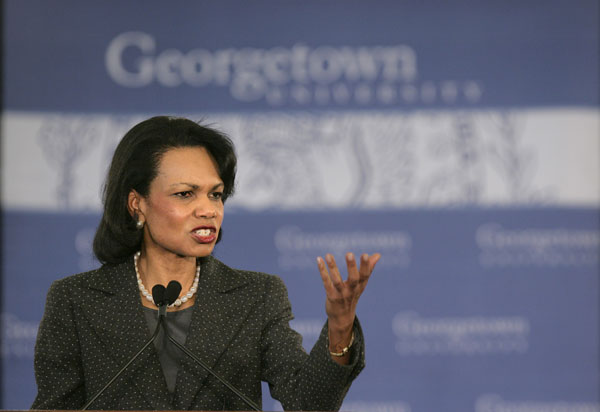
Rice unveils her plan for restructuring American foreign policy, which she calls "Transformational Diplomacy," during a January 18, 2006 speech at Georgetown University

Transformational Diplomacy is a diplomacy initiative championed by former United States secretary of state Condoleezza Rice for reinvigorating American foreign policy and the United States Foreign Service.

As Secretary of State, Rice championed the expansion of democratic governments. Rice stated that the September 11, 2001 attacks were rooted in “oppression and despair” and so, the U.S. must advance democratic reform and support basic rights throughout the greater Middle East. Rice has also reformed and restructured the department, as well as U.S. diplomacy as a whole. "Transformational Diplomacy" is the goal which Rice describes as "work[ing] with our many partners around the world… [and] build[ing] and sustain[ing] democratic, well-governed states that will respond to the needs of their people and conduct themselves responsibly in the international system."

== Elements ==
Rice's Transformational Diplomacy involved five core elements:

- Relocating American diplomats to the places in the world where they are needed most, such as China, India, Brazil, Egypt, Nigeria, Indonesia, South Africa, and Lebanon.
- Requiring diplomats to serve some time in hardship locations such as Iraq, Afghanistan, Sudan, and Angola; gain expertise in at least two regions; and become fluent in two foreign languages, such as Chinese, Arabic, or Urdu.
- Focusing on regional solutions to problems like terrorism, drug trafficking, and diseases.
- Working with other countries on a bilateral basis to help them build a stronger infrastructure, and decreasing foreign nations' dependence on American hand-outs and assistance.
- Creating a high-level position, Director of Foreign Assistance, to oversee U.S. foreign aid managed by the two agencies that manage the majority of foreign aid, the Department of State and the United States Agency for International Development (USAID). However this new entity would not directly supervise foreign aid managed by other U.S. Government agencies or departments such as the Department of Defense or the Department of Agriculture.

Rice said that these moves were needed to help "maintain security, fight poverty, and make democratic reforms" in these countries and would help improve foreign nations' legal, economic, healthcare, and educational systems.

== Regionalization ==
Another aspect of Transformational Diplomacy is the emphasis on finding regional solutions. Rice also pressed for finding transnational solutions as well, stating that "in the 21st century, geographic regions are growing ever more integrated economically, politically and culturally. This creates new opportunities but it also presents new challenges, especially from transnational threats like terrorism and weapons proliferation and drug smuggling and trafficking in persons and disease."

Another aspect of the emphasis on regional solutions is the implementation of small, agile, "rapid-response" teams to tackle problems like disease, instead of the traditional approach of calling on experts in an embassy. Rice explained that this means moving diplomats out of the "back rooms of foreign ministries" and putting more effort into "localizing" the State Department's diplomatic posture in foreign nations. The secretary emphasized the need for diplomats to move into the largely unreached "bustling new population centers" and to spread out "more widely across countries" in order to become more familiar with local issues and people.

== Implementation ==
=== Abroad ===
As previously mentioned, the Department of State has begun redistribution of employees from more established embassies to areas requiring additional diplomatic focus. Through the process of "Rightsizing", some missions have trimmed staff, freeing personnel to work in other areas. According to State, "Rightsizing is ensuring that the mix of U.S. Government agencies and their personnel overseas is appropriately aligned with U.S. foreign policy priorities, security concerns, and overall resource constraints. It may result in the addition or reduction of staff, or a change in the mix of staff at a given embassy or consulate overseas."

Additional personnel are being deployed in several endeavors. One prominent program is the establishment of American Presence Posts. These ultra-small consulates are being placed in countries needing additional on-site personnel.

=== At Home: Harnessing Web 2.0 ===
The Office of eDiplomacy within the Department is actively developing a number of technologies which allow the diplomatic community to share and maintain institutional knowledge.

One of the most significant efforts to date are Virtual Presence Posts (VPPs). This new approach to rendering services usually provided by a traditional on-site diplomatic mission, VPPs allow for U.S. diplomatic presence in foreign cities without buildings or permanent staff. The technique involves regular travel, programs, media outreach, and new technology. As of September 2007, there were 42 VPPs worldwide. (A list of VPPs is in the article on the Office of eDiplomacy).

Additional initiatives use some of the best collaboration technologies available on the Internet via Web 2.0 and replicate them on Department of State Intranets. These include:

- Diplopedia, a wiki space that is the encyclopedia of the Department of State, containing thousands of entries.
- Communities @ State, a series of communities of practice using web log (blog) software that are designed to strengthen various types of communities within the Department. As of May 2008, there were 47 communities at State, ranging from a technical discussion group to groups of diplomats involved in human rights reporting and the Virtual Post program.
- Virtual Work Environments: eDiplomacy is poised to play a leading role in the Windows SharePoint Services (WSS) adoption effort at State. The State Messaging and Archive Retrieval Toolset (SMART) program is heading the WSS deployment effort.
- Classified web publishing for sharing diplomatic reporting and analysis with the U.S. Government's foreign affairs and national security communities.

== At the two year mark ==
Rice returned to Gaston Hall at Georgetown University on February 12, 2008. While reiterating concepts exposed earlier, she presented several new ideas to strengthen diplomacy and the Foreign Service:

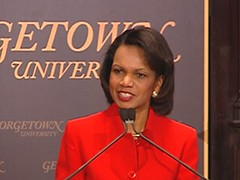
Rice again speaks at Georgetown on Transformational Diplomacy in February, 2008

- In the president's 2009 budget, we are asking Congress to fund 1,100 new positions for the State Department and 300 new positions for USAID. So as we continue to use our resources wisely and continue to transform the practice, posture, and purpose of our diplomacy, we will need greater capacity.
- America will need to forge a partnership between our civilians and our military. We are urging Congress to meet the president's request to double the number of our positions for political advisers to military forces, diplomats who can work not only with four-star generals, but also deploy as civilian experts to Navy SEAL teams and to North Africa.
- Establish a Civilian Response Corps. This expeditionary group will be led by a core team of diplomats that could, deploy with the 82nd Airborne within 48 hours of a country falling into conflict. These first responders would be able to summon the skills of hundreds of civilian experts across our federal government, as well as thousands of private volunteers – doctors and lawyers, engineers and agricultural experts, police officers and public administrators.

== Criticism ==
Defense Secretary Robert Gates called for additional State resources and Rice responded, stating

"We will not meet the challenges of the 21st century through military or any other means alone. Our national security requires the integration of our universal principles with all elements of our national power: our defense, our diplomacy, our development assistance, our democracy promotion efforts, free trade, and the good work of our private sector and society. And it is the State Department, more than any other agency of government, that is called to lead this work."

An office leading change, the State Office of the Coordinator for Reconstruction and Stabilization, has had staffing troubles and has not received requested funding from State although paradoxically some funding has come from a Department of Defense authorization.

The United States Foreign Service was also feeling the strain of staffing, with 10% of positions having been held vacant worldwide in the midst of a shortage of over 1,000 positions.

== See also ==
- United States Department of State
- United States Foreign Service
- Smart power, the philosophy adopted by successor Secretary of State Hillary Clinton
