= Virtual Student Federal Service =

American internship program

The Virtual Student Federal Service (VSFS), formerly known as the Virtual Student Foreign Service, is a U.S. Department of State program that offers opportunities for American college and university students to virtually intern at U.S. federal agencies. There are over 500 opportunities available at 33 federal agencies, and many of the opportunities are looking for more than one intern. Interns can be enrolled in a class or classes at any tertiary institution, but they must be American citizens. All work is virtual, and background clearances are not required. These opportunities are unpaid, but offer work experience, sometimes involving foreign languages.

== History ==
The Virtual Student Federal Service was announced by United States Secretary of State Hillary Clinton in May 2009 as one of several programs in Clinton’s 21st Century Statecraft initiative. Twenty-first Century Statecraft is defined as, “[t]he complementing of traditional foreign policy tools with newly innovated and adapted instruments of statecraft that fully leverage the networks, technologies, and demographics of our interconnected world.” VSFS partners with U.S. diplomatic posts overseas and State Department, U.S. Agency for International Development (USAID), the U.S. Department of Agriculture (USDA), NASA, and many other federal agencies to provide virtual internship opportunities.

The first virtual internship year coincided with the 2009–2010 academic year.

== Program details ==
Internships begin in the Fall and end in the Spring, with an application open period in July. Students commit for the academic year, contributing 10 hours a week for the virtual internship. Students communicate with their supervisors often through email, telephone, and Skype. The nature of work varies depending on what the agency needs. The work may be research-based, where the student is required to contribute to reports on issues such as economics, the environment, and human rights, or the work may be technology-focused, such as creating blogs and producing electronic journals. Language skills are sometimes required.

=== Examples of projects (from 2017–2018) ===
- United States Department of State: Help build a successful partnership among Department of State bureaus and offices to improve the way employees worldwide use data and knowledge to accomplish their missions.
- United States Agency for International Development (USAID): Help connect, support, and promote the work of the Higher Education Solutions Network (HESN) at USAID, a global network of universities that harnesses science, technology, and innovation to solve development challenges.
- Central Intelligence Agency (CIA): We seek an intern who can assist in identifying best practices from academia (e.g. cognitive/behavioral science, business/management theory), government, and the private sector so that we may apply this research toward internal programs.
- Smithsonian Institution: Help millions of National Zoo visitors plan their visits by designing and building a cutting edge "plan your day" tool.
- National Park Service: Display and interpret three large fossil specimens in a permanent Visitor Center installation. This project will include designing an interpretive panel, sign or wall display that tells the story of these fossils, while offering the visitor with some context for the significance of these artifacts.
- United States Department of Defense: Analyze open-source online data to map and draw conclusions on insurgent activity and international force response in conflict areas in Africa.
- NASA: Facilitate agency-wide virtual events and teach employees how to effectively use multimedia platforms; additionally, you will be responsible for coaching NASA employees on the logistics of running a virtual event.

== Application process ==
The competitive process starts with students applying through the USAJobs.gov website. In the application, students may choose from a list of available projects, selecting three in their order of preference. e-Interns must be U.S. citizens.

== Further information ==
- Government crowdsourcing
- Virtual Student Federal Service – U.S. Department of State
- Virtual Student Federal Service (VSFS) 2011-2012 eIntern Positions – U.S. Department of State
- Frequently Asked Question – U.S. Department of State
