= State Department Sounding Board =

US Secretary of State Hillary Clinton asked for the creation of an online forum for State Department employees to submit ideas directly to the Secretary. The Sounding Board was an intranet blog developed and launched in February 2009 by staff from the State Department's Office of eDiplomacy.

The platform metrics soon generated 27,000 page views a month and serves as a global water cooler for a workforce spread around the planet. It has served as a platform for brain-storming ideas and crowd sourcing non-policy solutions.

Employee response to the online forum varied from enthusiasm to concern for maintaining confidentiality and decorum. Some contributors to the Sounding Board expressed worry that public airing of internal discussion might embarrass the Department of State; comments that were subsequently published in Washington Post reporter Al Kamen's column "In The Loop".

The Sounding Board was an internal platform (discussion forum) for State Department employees to exchange ideas, while DipNote is the Secretary of State's blog on the internet. The use of social media was seen as essential for 21st century diplomacy. The Department of State was "integrating social media into the job descriptions of all the foreign service officers", says New Media Director Katie Dowd.

The Sounding Board was ended on August 31, 2017.

== Other media references ==
- Hillary Clinton Launches E-Suggestion Box
- Federal News Radio: How to integrate social media into your agency, August 16, 2011, interview with Sounding Board program manager Kerry O'Connor

== Critiques ==
- Everything Is Broken: My Two Years at the U.S. Department of State: An excerpt that discusses the Sounding Board: "As an important side note, before resigning to attend graduate school in the summer of 2010, I had the chance to meet one-on-one with a high-level manager (and now ambassador) involved in oversight of the Sounding Board. He stated that the Sounding Board, which had been sold to us as a bottom-up tool for employee ideas in early 2009, was primarily a "cathartic" outlet for employees. Someone might want to explain that to the mass of State employees who cropped up to suggest specific, often in-depth ideas online—over 1,500 by the summer of last year. Indeed, when I left there was no meaningful process in place to review and take appropriate action to either reject or on some level adopt these employee suggestions."

== See also ==
- DipNote
- Diplopedia
