= 1939 in radio =

The year 1939 saw a number of significant events in radio broadcasting.

== Events ==
- 1 April – The rumor that Hitler is dead sweeps the United States, as millions of CBS radio listeners hear the Führer cut off in mid-speech during a shortwave relay of his address at the dedication of the German battleship Tirpitz in Wilhelmshaven.
- 22 April – Premiere of Gian Carlo Menotti's radio opera The Old Maid and the Thief on NBC Radio in New York.
- 17 June – A trans-Atlantic radio broadcast features coloratura soprano Ewa Bandrowska-Turska singing four songs by Karol Szymanowski from Wawel Castle in Kraków, Poland, for a United States audience on WENR.
- 15 July – Inauguration of DZRH, one of the oldest radio stations in the Philippines.
- 29 July – In France, with war on the horizon, a package of decrees tightens the state's control of public radio and obliges all private stations to broadcast, unedited, the government's Radio-Journal in place of their own news programmes.
- 7 August – Official test transmissions begin from Radio Andorra. The station is ceremonially inaugurated two days later by the French Minister of Public Works, Anatole de Monzie.
- September – The French government's radio for schools initiative ends until 1946.
- 31 August – The Gleiwitz incident, a false flag attack on the German Gliwice Radio Tower by Nazi German troops posing as Poles, is one of several border operations forming Operation Himmler to give a pretext for the invasion of Poland the following day.
- 1 September – At 18.55 local time BBC engineers receive the order to begin closing down all UK transmitters in preparation for wartime broadcasting: this marks the end of the National and Regional Programmes of the BBC. At 20.15 local time the BBC's Home Service begins transmission: this will be the corporation's only domestic radio channel for the first four months of World War II.
- 3 September
  - Neville Chamberlain, Prime Minister of the United Kingdom, speaking from 10 Downing Street, announces on the BBC at 11.15 local time (10.15 GMT) that "this country is at war with Germany".
  - Fireside chat by the President of the United States, Franklin D. Roosevelt, On the European War, advocating U.S. neutrality.
  - Prime Minister of Canada Mackenzie King, in English, and Justice Minister Ernest Lapointe, in French, give an international radio address stating the Dominion's intention to declare war.
- 6 September – William Joyce makes his first broadcast for German radio, reading the news in English.
- 18 September – English-language propaganda radio programme Germany Calling is first broadcast to the United Kingdom on medium wave nominally from Reichssender Hamburg station Bremen (via the coastal Norddeich radio station) and by shortwave to the United States. In today's London Daily Express, pseudonymous radio critic Jonah Barrington nicknames the station's English-speaking broadcaster "Lord Haw-Haw". He is probably referring to German playboy journalist Wolf Mittler, who makes a few such broadcasts, but the name transfers to cashiered British Army officer Norman Baillie-Stewart (dismissed in December) and then to American-born Irish-raised William Joyce, with whom it is most associated. Baillie-Stewart and Joyce hold U.K. passports at this time, rendering themselves liable to prosecution for treason. The station also plays jazz music, prohibited on German domestic stations.
- 19 September – Popular British radio comedy show It's That Man Again with Tommy Handley is first broadcast on the BBC Home service, following trial broadcasts from 12 July. Known as "ITMA", and also featuring Jack Train and many others, it runs until Handley's death in 1949; the performers have initially been evacuated to Bristol.
- 21 September – WJSV broadcast day: Radio station WJSV in Washington, D.C. records an entire broadcast day for preservation in the United States National Archives.
- 23 September – Invasion of Poland: The Polskie Radio network comes off the air when German forces fire on its Warsaw studio, terminating a live broadcast of Chopin's Nocturne in C♯ minor, Op. posth. performed by Jewish pianist Władysław Szpilman. Szpilman will survive the Warsaw Ghetto and reinaugurate the station in 1945 by playing the same piece. The Raszyn transmitter is destroyed in the invasion.
- 6 November – Hedda Hopper's Hollywood debuts on radio in the United States with gossip columnist Hedda Hopper as host; the show runs until 1951, making Hopper a powerful figure among the Hollywood elite.
- 17 November – Radio station ZQI begins broadcasting in Jamaica, initially for an hour a week.
- 11 December – Havana, Cuba's CMQ (from 1959, state-owned Radio Rebelde) becomes the first affiliate for the NBC Red Network based outside of the United States and Canada.
- 12 December – James M. Cox gains control of WSB and a 40 percent interest in WAGA, both in Atlanta, Georgia.
- 22 December – KORN begins broadcasting in Fremont, Nebraska, on 1370 kHz.
- 25 December
  - In his Christmas broadcast on BBC radio, King George VI of the United Kingdom quotes Minnie Louise Haskins' poem "The Gate of the Year".
  - Charles Dickens's A Christmas Carol is read for the first time on American radio (CBS).

== Debuts ==
=== Programs ===
- 14 January – Honolulu Bound debuts on CBS.
- 16 January – I Love a Mystery debuts on west coast NBC stations.
- 21 January – Brenthouse debuts on the Blue Network in the United States.
- 23 January – Doc Barclay's Daughters debuts on CBS.
- 13 February – The Carters of Elm Street debuts on NBC.
- 19 February – Norman Corwin's radio series Words Without Music is premiered on the CBS Radio Network.
- 25 March – Arch Oboler's Plays debuts on NBC.
- 3 April – Mr. District Attorney (1939–1952) debuts on NBC.
- 7 April – Author, Author debuts on Mutual.
- 29 May – The Affairs of Anthony debuts on the Blue Network.
- 29 May – When a Girl Marries debuts on CBS.
- 5 June – Caroline's Golden Store debuts on NBC.
- 18 June – The Adventures of Ellery Queen (1939–1948) debuts on CBS.
- 2 July – The Aldrich Family debuts on NBC.
- 3 July – Blondie debuts on CBS.
- 4 July – Alec Templeton Time debuts on NBC.
- 12 July – It's That Man Again debuts on the BBC Home Service.
- 6 August – The Dinah Shore Show debuts on the Blue Network.
- 3 September – Let the People Sing by J. B. Priestley, written for radio and read by the author.
- 11 September – Brenda Curtis debuts on CBS.
- 25 September – Singing Together debuts on BBC Radio schools service (1939–2001).
- 2 October – The New Adventures of Sherlock Holmes debuts on the Blue Network (1939–1950).
- 7 October – Art for Your Sake debuts on NBC.
- 9 October – By Kathleen Norris debuts on CBS.
- 16 October – Against the Storm debuts on NBC.
- 17 October – Captain Midnight debuts on WGN.
- 19 October – Don Winslow of the Navy debuts on the Blue Network.
- 25 December – The Bartons debuts on the Blue Network.

=== Stations ===
- 28 July – KVAK, Atchison, Kansas, begins broadcasting on 1420 kHz with 100 W power (daytime only).
- 25 December – The Bartons debuts on the Blue Network.
- October - KOVO 960 (then at 1210) signs on the air from Provo, Utah.
- December – WCAR, Pontiac, Michigan, begins broadcasting on 1100 kHz with 1 KW power (daytime only).

== Endings ==
- 27 February – Alias Jimmy Valentine ends its run on network radio (Blue Network in the US).
- 7 May – Americans All, Immigrants All ends its run on network radio (CBS).
- 30 June
  - Central City ends its run on network radio (NBC Red).
  - Howie Wing ends its run on network radio (CBS).
- 28 July – Her Honor, Nancy James ends its run on network radio (CBS).
- 7 September – Radio Normandy signs off for the last time.
- 8 September – Calling All Cars ends its run on network radio (CBS West Coast network).

== Births ==
- 23 January – Vincent Duggleby, English personal finance radio presenter.
- 3 March – Larry Burkett (died 2003), American evangelical Christian author and radio personality.
- 4 March – Keith Skues, English radio presenter.
- 19 March – Bob Kingsley (died 2019), American country music personality.
- 7 May – David Hatch (died 2007), English radio executive and performer.
- 30 August – John Peel, born John Ravenscroft (died 2004), English DJ.
- 19 September – Louise Botting, English radio presenter and businesswoman.
- 18 December – Alex Bennett, born Bennett Schwarzmann, American talk show host.

== Deaths ==
- 9 March – Ernie Hare, American singer, known for The Happiness Boys, 55
- 16 June – Chick Webb, American jazz drummer, 34
- 20 July – Sir Dan Godfrey, English conductor, 71
- 6 December – Charles Dalmorès, French tenor, 68
- 19 December – Eric Fogg, English composer and conductor, 36 (killed by Underground train)
