= 1939 in British radio =

This is a list of events from British radio in 1939.

== Events ==
=== January to May ===
- No events.

=== June ===
- 14 June – Clevedon and Start Point transmitting stations begin broadcasting the BBC Regional Programme for the West of England, partly replacing Washford.

=== July ===
- No events.

=== August ===
- August – The BBC Monitoring service is established at Wood Norton Hall in Worcestershire, acquired earlier in the year as a standby location in case of the need to evacuate facilities from London.

=== September ===
- 1 September – At 6:55pm local time, BBC engineers receive the order to begin closing down all transmitters in preparation for wartime broadcasting: this marks the end of the National and Regional Programmes. At 8:15pm, the BBC's Home Service begins transmission: this will be the corporation's only domestic radio channel for the first four months of World War II (BBC Television has been shut down until 1946). There will be a daily Welsh language bulletin of world news at 5pm. Programming is initially limited to news, announcements, gramophone records and live music played by a limited pool of staff musicians, with extensive use of cinema organist Sandy MacPherson.
- 3 September
  - Prime Minister Neville Chamberlain, introduced by Alvar Lidell and speaking from 10 Downing Street, announces on the BBC at 11:15am local time that "this country is at war with Germany".
  - Yorkshire-born novelist and playwright J. B. Priestley reads the first installment of his novel Let the People Sing, a celebration of local democracy (published on 4 January), on the Home Service.
- 6 September – William Joyce makes his first broadcast for German radio, reading the news in English.
- 18 September – English-language propaganda radio programme Germany Calling is first broadcast to the United Kingdom on medium wave nominally from Reichssender Hamburg station Bremen (via the coastal Norddeich radio station). In that day's Daily Express, pseudonymous radio critic Jonah Barrington nicknames the station's English-speaking broadcaster "Lord Haw-Haw". He is probably referring to German playboy journalist Wolf Mittler, who makes a few such broadcasts, but the name transfers to cashiered British Army officer Norman Baillie-Stewart (dismissed from the station in December) and then to American-born Irish-raised William Joyce, with whom it is most associated. Baillie-Stewart and Joyce hold U.K. passports at this time, rendering themselves liable to prosecution for treason.
- 19 September – Popular radio comedy show It's That Man Again with Tommy Handley is first broadcast on the BBC Home service, following trial broadcasts from 12 July. Known as "ITMA", and also featuring Jack Train and many others, it runs until Handley's death in 1949. The performers have initially been evacuated to Bristol.

=== October ===
- 17 October – A live broadcast from RAF Hendon airbase in north London, in front of a specially invited audience of RAF personnel, is relayed worldwide by the BBC. The bill stars black American jazz singer Adelaide Hall, Mantovani and His Orchestra, comic singers The Western Brothers, and Harry Roy and his big band.

=== November ===
- No events.

=== December ===
- 25 December – In his Christmas broadcast on BBC Radio, King George VI quotes Minnie Louise Haskins' poem "The Gate of the Year".

== Station debut ==
- 1 September – BBC Home Service (1939–1967)

== Debuts ==
- 12 July – It's That Man Again (1939–1949)
- 23 July – The Thirty-Nine Steps on BBC Regional Programme London (1939)
- 25 September – Singing Together on BBC Radio schools service (1939–2001)

== Continuing radio programmes ==
=== 1930s ===
- In Town Tonight (1933–1960)

== Births ==
- 23 January – Vincent Duggleby, personal finance radio presenter (died 2024)
- 3 March – Bill Frindall, cricket scorer (died 2009)
- 4 March – Keith Skues, radio presenter
- 23 April – Tom Vernon, broadcaster (died 2013)
- 5 May – Ray Gosling, broadcast documentary maker (died 2013)
- 7 May – David Hatch, radio executive and performer (died 2007)
- 11 July – John Walters, radio music producer and jazz trumpeter (died 2001)
- 30 August – John Peel, born John Ravenscroft, DJ (died 2004)
- 19 September – Louise Botting, radio presenter and businesswoman (died 2026)
- 23 September – Henry Blofeld, cricket commentator
- 1 October – Geoffrey Whitehead, comic actor
- 27 October – John Cleese, comic actor
- 3 November – Judith Bumpus, radio arts producer (died 2010)

== Deaths ==
- 20 July – Sir Dan Godfrey, orchestral conductor, 71
- 19 December – Eric Fogg, composer and conductor, 36 (killed by Underground train)

== See also ==
- 1939 in British music
- 1939 in British television
- 1939 in the United Kingdom
- List of British films of 1939
