= Duggleby (surname) =

Duggleby is a surname. Notable people with the surname include:

- Adam Duggleby (born 1984), British cyclist
- Bill Duggleby (1874–1944), American baseball player
- Emma Duggleby (born 1971), English amateur golfer
- Vincent Duggleby (born 1939), British financial journalist

== See also ==
- David Duggleby, auctioneer and valuer
