= William Joyce =

American-born fascist and propaganda broadcaster (1906–1946)

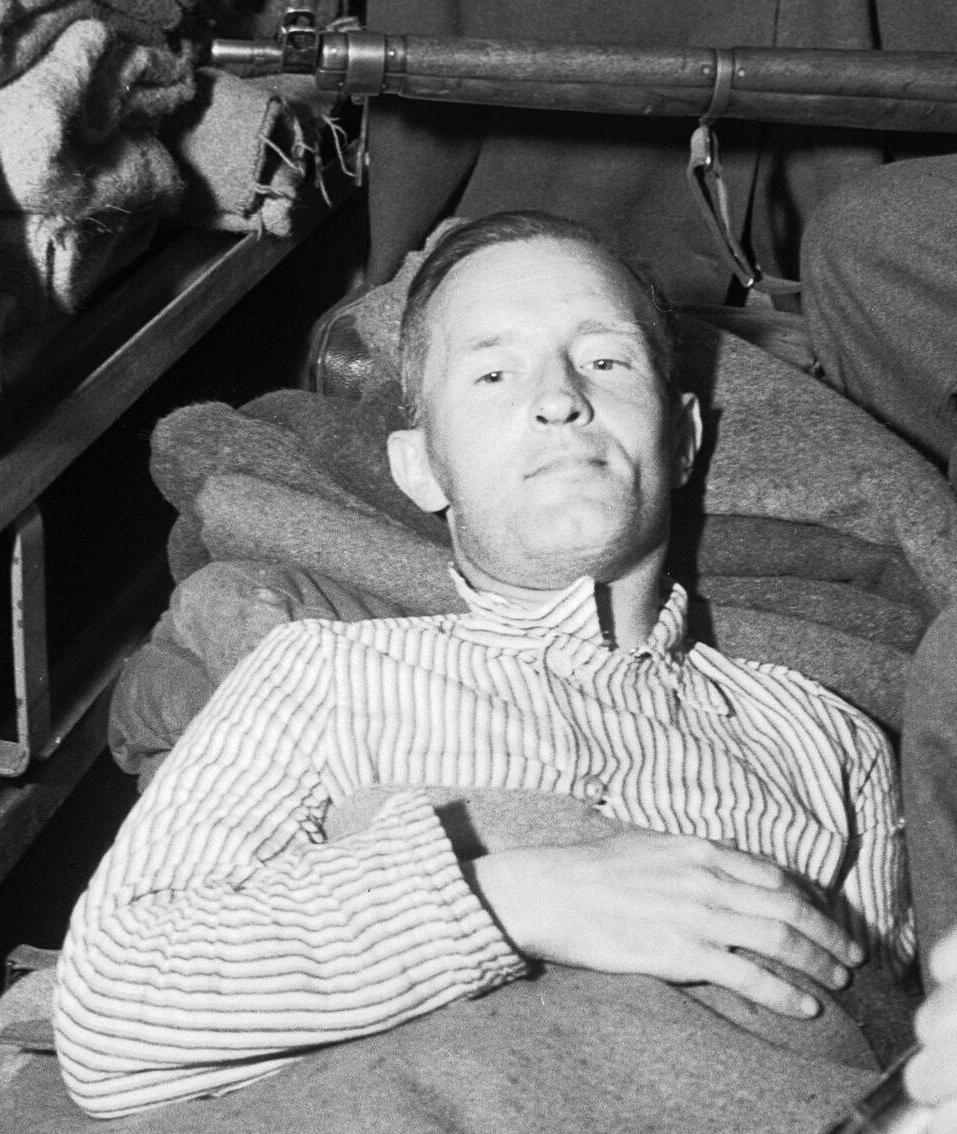
- Joyce shortly after capture, 1945
- Born: William Brooke Joyce; 24 April 1906; New York City, U.S.
- Died: 3 January 1946 (aged 39); Wandsworth Prison, London, England
- Resting place: Bohermore Cemetery, Galway, Ireland; 53.28141°N 9.038341°W
- Other name: Lord Haw-Haw
- Citizenship: United States (1906–1946); Germany (1940–1946)
- Education: Birkbeck College, London
- Known for: Broadcasting German propaganda in World War II
- Political party: British Fascists; British Union of Fascists; National Socialist League
- Children: 2
- Status: Executed by hanging
- Conviction: High treason
- Penalty: Death

William Brooke Joyce (24 April 1906 – 3 January 1946), nicknamed Lord Haw-Haw, was an American-born Nazi propaganda broadcaster during the Second World War. After moving from New York to Ireland and subsequently to England, Joyce became a member of Oswald Mosley's British Union of Fascists (BUF) from 1932, before finally moving to Germany at the outset of the war where he took Nazi German citizenship in 1940.

After his capture, Joyce, who had been issued a British passport when he lived in England after misstating his nationality, was convicted in the United Kingdom of high treason in 1945 and sentenced to death. The Court of Appeal and the House of Lords both upheld his conviction. He was hanged in Wandsworth Prison by Albert Pierrepoint on 3 January 1946, making him the most recent person executed for treason in the United Kingdom. (Note: Theodore Schurch was hanged the following day, but for the crime of treachery rather than for treason.)

== Early life ==
William Brooke Joyce was born on Herkimer Street in Brooklyn, New York, United States. His father was Michael Francis Joyce, an Irish Catholic from a family of tenant farmers in Ballinrobe, County Mayo, who had acquired U.S. citizenship in 1894. His mother was Gertrude Emily Brooke, who although born in Shaw and Crompton, Lancashire, was from a well-off Anglican Anglo-Irish family of physicians associated with County Roscommon. A few years after William's birth, the family returned to Salthill, County Galway. Joyce attended Coláiste Iognáid, a Jesuit school in County Galway, from 1915 to 1921. His parents were devoted unionists and hostile to Irish republicanism, with his mother being a devout Protestant. There were tensions between her and her family because she married a Catholic.

During the Anglo-Irish War, Joyce was allegedly recruited while still in his mid-teens by Captain Patrick William Keating, an Intelligence Corps officer stationed in County Galway, to work as a courier. He was also suspected by the Irish Republican Army (IRA) of working as an informant for the Black and Tans, "which could have had extremely serious consequences in 1920–21." The IRA eventually attempted to assassinate Joyce while he was on his way home from school, and Keating, fearing for Joyce's safety, arranged for him to be enlisted into the Worcestershire Regiment, moving him out of harm's way in Ireland by transferring him to the Norton Barracks in Worcestershire where the regiment was stationed. However, Joyce was discharged a few months later when it was discovered that he was underage.

Joyce remained in England and briefly attended King's College School, Wimbledon. His family followed him to England two years later. Joyce had relatives in Birkenhead, Cheshire, whom he visited on a few occasions. He then applied to Birkbeck College, London, where he entered the Officer Training Corps. At Birkbeck, he obtained a first-class honours degree in English. After graduating he applied for a job in the Foreign Office, but was rejected and took a job as a teacher. Joyce developed an interest in fascism and worked with, but never joined, the British Fascists of Rotha Lintorn-Orman. On 22 October 1924, while stewarding a meeting in support of Conservative Party candidate Jack Lazarus ahead of the 1924 general election, Joyce was attacked by communists and received a deep razor slash across his right cheek. It left a permanent scar which ran from the earlobe to the corner of the mouth, known as a Glasgow smile. While Joyce often said that his attackers were Jewish, historian Colin Holmes claims that Joyce's first wife told him that "it wasn't a Jewish Communist who disfigured him .... He was knifed by an Irish woman". This incident had occurred during a clash between British nationalists and Irish nationalists.

== British Union of Fascists ==
Flag of the British Union of Fascists

In 1932, Joyce joined the British Union of Fascists (BUF) under Sir Oswald Mosley and swiftly became a leading speaker, praised for the power of his oratory. The journalist and novelist Cecil Roberts described a speech given by Joyce:

Thin, pale, intense, he had not been speaking many minutes before we were electrified by this man ... so terrifying in its dynamic force, so vituperative, so vitriolic.

In 1934, Joyce was promoted to be the BUF's Director of Propaganda, replacing Wilfred Risdon, and later appointed deputy leader. As well as being a gifted speaker, Joyce gained the reputation of a savage brawler. His violent rhetoric and willingness to physically confront anti-fascist elements head-on played no small part in further politically marginalising the BUF. After a bloody incident at a BUF rally in Olympia in 1934, Joyce spearheaded the group's policy shift from campaigning for economic revival through corporatism to a focus on antisemitism. He was instrumental in changing the name of the BUF to "British Union of Fascists and National Socialists" in 1936 and stood as a party candidate in the 1937 elections to the London County Council. In 1936, Joyce lived for a year in Whitstable, where he owned a radio and electrical shop.

Between April 1934 and 1937, when Mosley sacked him, Joyce served as Area Administrative Officer for the BUF West Sussex division. He was supported in the role by Norah Elam as Sussex Women's Organiser, with her partner Dudley Elam, the son of an Irish nationalist, taking on the role of Sub-Branch Officer for Worthing. Under this regime, West Sussex became a hub of fascist activity, ranging from hosting BUF summer camps to organising meetings and rallies, lunches, etc. Elam shared many speaking platforms with Joyce and worked on propaganda speeches for him. One particular sore point for Joyce was the Government of India Bill, passed in 1935, designed to give a measure of autonomy to India, allowing freedom and the development of limited self-government. Joyce harboured a desire to become Viceroy of India should Mosley ever head a BUF government, and is recorded as describing the backers of the bill as "feeble" and "one loathsome, foetid, purulent, tumid mass of hypocrisy, hiding behind Jewish Dictators".

Joyce was sacked from his paid position when Mosley drastically reduced the BUF staff shortly after the 1937 elections, after which Joyce promptly formed a breakaway organisation, the National Socialist League. After Joyce's departure, the BUF turned its focus from antisemitism to activism, opposing a war with Nazi Germany. Although Joyce had been deputy leader of the party from 1933 and an effective fighter and orator, Mosley snubbed him in his autobiography and later denounced him as a traitor because of his wartime activities. Unlike Joyce, the Elams did not escape detention under Defence Regulation 18B; both were arrested on the same day as Mosley in May 1940. In later life, Elam reported that, although she disliked Joyce, she believed that his execution by the British in 1946 was wrong, stating that he should not have been regarded as a traitor to England because he was not English, but Irish.

== In Germany ==
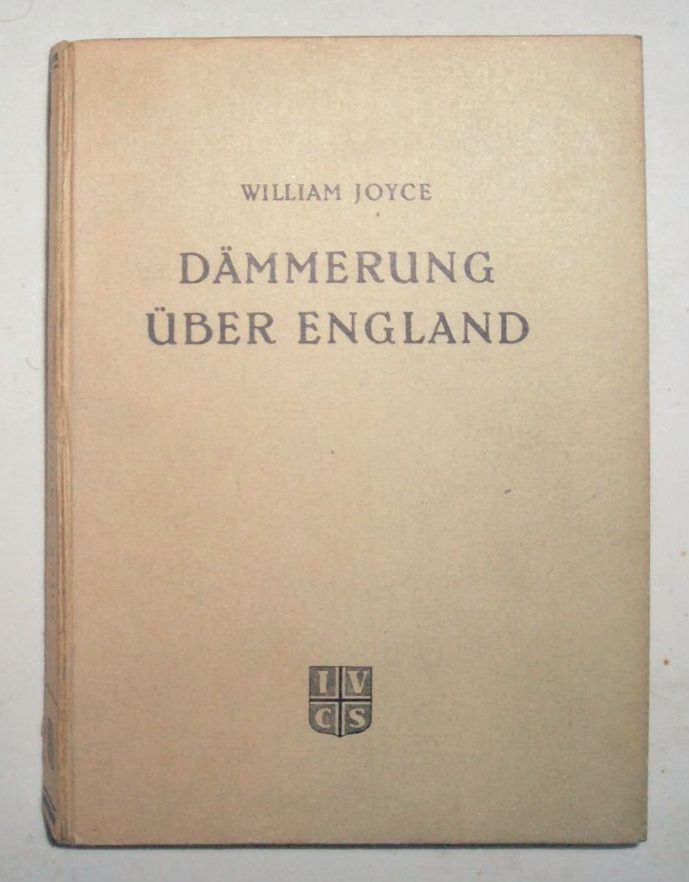
Dämmerung über England (Twilight over England), 3rd edition, Berlin 1942

In late August 1939, shortly before the Second World War broke out, Joyce and his wife Margaret fled to Germany. Joyce had been tipped off that the British authorities intended to detain him under Defence Regulation 18B. He became a naturalised German citizen in 1940.

In Berlin, Joyce could not find employment until a chance meeting with fellow Mosleyite Dorothy Eckersley got him an audition at the Rundfunkhaus ("broadcasting house"). Eckersley was the former wife or second wife of the chief engineer of the BBC, Peter Eckersley. Despite having a heavy cold and having almost lost his voice, Joyce was recruited immediately for radio announcements and scriptwriting at German radio's English service. His first broadcast was reading the news in English on 6 September 1939, just three days after the declaration of war between Britain and Germany. On 18 September, he received a contract as a newsreader. After the dismissal of Norman Baillie-Stewart in December, Joyce became the principal reader of news and the writer of six talks a week, thus becoming the station's best-known propaganda broadcaster.

In a newspaper article of 14 September 1939, the radio critic Jonah Barrington of the Daily Express wrote of hearing a gent "moaning periodically from Zeesen" who "speaks English of the haw-haw, damit-get-out-of-my-way variety". Four days later he gave him the nickname "Lord Haw-Haw". The voice Barrington heard is widely believed to be that of Wolf Mittler, a German journalist whose near-flawless English sounded like a caricature of an upper-crust Englishman. However, Mittler only made five or six broadcasts and was quickly replaced by other broadcasters, leading to uncertainty over whom Barrington had been referring to. When Joyce became the most prominent broadcaster of Nazi propaganda by the end of 1939, the name stuck to him. Joyce himself began to trade on the notoriety of the nickname more than a year later, on 3 April 1941, when he announced himself as "William Joyce, otherwise known as Lord Haw-Haw".

Joyce's broadcasts initially came from studios in Berlin, later being transferred (because of heavy Allied bombing) to Luxembourg City and finally to Apen near Hamburg, and were relayed over a network of German-controlled radio stations in Zeesen, Hamburg, Bremen, Luxembourg, Hilversum, Calais and Oslo.

Joyce also broadcast on and wrote scripts for the German Büro Concordia organisation, which ran several black propaganda stations, many of which pretended to broadcast illegally from within Britain. His role in writing the scripts increased over time, and German radio capitalised on his public persona. Initially an anonymous broadcaster, Joyce eventually revealed his real name to his listeners and he would occasionally be announced as, "William Joyce, otherwise known as Lord Haw-Haw". Urban legends soon circulated about Lord Haw-Haw, alleging that the broadcaster was well-informed about political and military events to the point of near-omniscience. In the summer of 1942 it was decided that he should no longer read the news and, from then on, he read only his own talks in Views on the News.

Listening to Joyce's broadcasts was officially discouraged but was not illegal, and many Britons tuned in. There was a desire by civilian listeners to hear what the other side was saying, as information during wartime was strictly censored. At the height of his influence, in 1940, Joyce had an estimated six million regular and 18 million occasional listeners in the UK. The broadcasts always began with the announcer's words, "Germany calling, Germany calling, Germany calling". These broadcasts urged the British people to surrender and were well known for their jeering, sarcastic and menacing tone.

The Reich Security Main Office commissioned Joyce to give lectures at the University of Berlin for SS members in the winter of 1941–42 on the topic of "British fascism and acute questions concerning the British world empire".

Joyce recorded his final broadcast on 30 April 1945, during the Battle of Berlin. Rambling and audibly drunk, he chided the UK for pursuing the war beyond mere containment of Germany and repeatedly warned of the "menace" of the Soviet Union. He signed off with a final defiant, "Heil Hitler and farewell". There are conflicting accounts as to whether this last programme was actually transmitted, although a recording was found in the Apen studios. The next day, Radio Hamburg was seized by British forces, and on 4 May Wynford Vaughan-Thomas used it to make a mock "Germany Calling" broadcast denouncing Joyce.

Besides broadcasting, Joyce's duties included writing propaganda for distribution among British prisoners of war, whom he tried to recruit into the British Free Corps of the Waffen-SS. He wrote a book, Twilight Over England, which was promoted by the German Ministry of Propaganda. The book unfavourably compared the evils of Jewish-dominated capitalist Britain with the alleged wonders of Nazi Germany. Adolf Hitler awarded Joyce the War Merit Cross (First Class) for his broadcasts, although he never met Joyce.

== Capture and trial ==
On 28 May 1945, Joyce was captured by British forces at Flensburg, near the German border with Denmark, which was the last capital of the Third Reich. Spotting a dishevelled figure while they were resting from gathering firewood, intelligence soldiers – including a Jewish German, Geoffrey Perry (born Horst Pinschewer), who had left Germany before the war – engaged him in conversation in French and English, eventually recognising his voice. After they asked whether he was Joyce, he reached into his pocket (actually reaching for a false passport); believing he was armed, Perry shot him through the buttocks, resulting in four wounds.

Two intelligence officers then drove Joyce to a border post and handed him over to British military police. He was then taken to London and tried at the Old Bailey on three counts of high treason:

1. William Joyce, on 18 September 1939, and on other days between that day and 29 May 1945, being a person owing allegiance to our Lord the King, and while a war was being carried on by the German Realm against our King, did traitorously adhere to the King's enemies in Germany, by broadcasting propaganda.
2. William Joyce, on 26 September 1940, being a person who owed allegiance as in the other count, adhered to the King's enemies by purporting to become naturalized as a subject of Germany.
3. William Joyce, on 18 September 1939, and on other days between that day and 2 July 1940 [i.e., before Joyce's passport expired], being a person owing allegiance to our Lord the King, and while a war was being carried on by the German Realm against our King, did traitorously adhere to the King's enemies in Germany, by broadcasting propaganda.

"Not guilty" were the first words from Joyce's mouth in his trial, as noted by Rebecca West in her book The Meaning of Treason. The only evidence offered that he had begun broadcasting from Germany while his British passport was valid was the testimony of a police inspector who claimed to have recognized his voice during a broadcast in September or October 1939 from his past public appearances.

Inquiries in the US, adduced in evidence at his trial, found that Joyce had never been a British subject, and it seemed that he would have to be acquitted based upon a lack of jurisdiction; he could not be convicted of betraying a country that was not his own. The trial judge, Mr. Justice Tucker, directed the jury to acquit Joyce of the first and second charges. However, the Attorney General, Sir Hartley Shawcross, successfully argued that Joyce's possession of a British passport, even though he had misstated his nationality to get it, entitled him until it expired to British diplomatic protection in Germany and therefore he owed allegiance to the King at the time he began working for the Germans.

The historian A. J. P. Taylor remarked in his book English History 1914–1945 that "Technically, Joyce was hanged for making a false statement when applying for a passport, the usual penalty for which is a small fine."

=== Appeal ===
Joyce's conviction was upheld by the Court of Appeal on 1 November 1945, and by Lords Jowitt L.C., Macmillan, Wright, Simonds, and Porter – although Porter dissented – of the House of Lords on 13 December 1945.

In the appeal, Joyce argued that possession of a passport did not entitle him to the protection of the Crown, and therefore did not perpetuate his duty of allegiance once he left the country, but the House of Lords rejected this argument. Lord Porter's dissenting opinion assumed that the question as to whether Joyce's duty of allegiance had terminated was a question of fact for the jury to decide, rather than a purely legal question for the judge. Joyce also argued that jurisdiction had been wrongly assumed by the court in electing to try an alien for offences committed in a foreign country. This argument was also rejected, on the basis that a state may exercise such jurisdiction in the interests of its own security.

Joyce's biographer, Nigel Farndale, suggests on the basis of documents made public for the first time between 2000 and 2005 that Joyce made a deal with his prosecutors not to reveal links he had to MI5. In return, his wife Margaret, known to radio listeners as "Lady Haw-Haw", was spared prosecution for high treason. Of the 33 British renegades and broadcasters caught in Germany at the end of the war, only Margaret Joyce, who died in London in 1972, was not charged with treason.

== Execution ==
Joyce went to his death unrepentant. He allegedly said:

In death as in life, I defy the Jews who caused this last war, and I defy the power of darkness which they represent. I warn the British people against the crushing imperialism of the Soviet Union. May Britain be great once again and in the hour of the greatest danger in the West may the standard be raised from the dust, crowned with the words – 'You have conquered nevertheless.' I am proud to die for my ideals and I am sorry for the sons of Britain who have died without knowing why.

"You have conquered nevertheless" was presumably a reference to "UND IHR HABT DOCH GESIEGT" ("and you have won nevertheless"), a phrase inscribed on the reverse side of the Blood Order medal. Other sources refer to his having said, "May the swastika be raised from the dust."

Joyce was executed on 3 January 1946 at Wandsworth Prison, aged 39. He was the penultimate person hanged for a crime other than murder in the UK. The last was Theodore Schurch, executed for treachery the following day at Pentonville Prison. In both cases, the hangman was Albert Pierrepoint. Joyce died "an Anglican, like his mother, despite a long and friendly correspondence with a Roman Catholic priest who fought hard for William's soul". The scar on Joyce's face split open from the pressure applied to his head upon his drop from the gallows.

=== Burial ===
As was customary for executed criminals, Joyce's remains were buried in an unmarked grave within the walls of Wandsworth Prison. In 1976, following a campaign by his daughter, Heather Iandolo, his body was reinterred in New Cemetery, Galway, as he had lived in Galway with his family from 1909 until 1922. Despite the ambiguity of his religious allegiances, he was given a Roman Catholic Tridentine Mass.

== Personal life ==
Joyce had two daughters with his first wife, Hazel, who later married Oswald Mosley's bodyguard, Eric Piercey. One daughter, Heather Iandolo (formerly Piercey), spoke publicly of her father, condemning his work for Nazi Germany while highlighting his warm personality towards herself. She died in 2022.

Joyce remarried in 1936, to Margaret née Cairns White. She died in 1972.

== In popular culture ==
The 1944 film Passport to Destiny features a character played by Gavin Muir as Herr Joyce/Lord Haw, based on William Joyce as Lord Haw-Haw.

Lord Haw-Haw appears as one of the central characters in Thomas Kilroy's 1986 play Double Cross. Stephen Rea originated the role.

== See also ==
- Axis Sally
- Aycliffe Angels
- Azzam the American
- Baghdad Bob (Comical Ali)
- Charles Bewley
- Fred W. Kaltenbach
- Hanoi Hannah
- Iva Toguri D'Aquino
- Jean Hérold-Paquis
- Ezra Pound
- John Amery
- Moussa Ibrahim
- Philippe Henriot
- Seoul City Sue
- Stuttgart traitor
- Tokyo Rose
- Mother Night (Novel)
