= Norman Baillie-Stewart =

British soldier and Nazi sympathiser (1909–1966)

- Baillie-Stewart in the uniform of the Seaforth Highlanders (1929–1933)
- Born: Norman Baillie Stewart Wright; 15 January 1909; London, England
- Died: 7 June 1966 (aged 57); Harmonstown Dublin, County Dublin, Republic of Ireland
- Other name: James Scott
- Education: Royal Military College, Sandhurst
- Known for: Spying for Germany, making propaganda radio broadcasts during World War 2
- Criminal charges: Violating the Official Secrets Act (1933); Committing an act likely to assist the enemy (1946)
- Criminal penalty: Five years imprisonment (1933); Five years imprisonment (1946)
- Children: Two
- Parent: Lieutenant Colonel Cron Hope Baillie Wright (father)
- Military career
- Allegiance: United Kingdom
- Branch: British Army
- Service years: 1927–1933
- Rank: Lieutenant
- Unit: Seaforth Highlanders

Norman Baillie-Stewart (15 January 1909 – 7 June 1966) was a British army officer who was arrested in 1933 for espionage, and subsequently convicted and imprisoned.

He was an active sympathiser of Nazi Germany, and moved there after his release from prison in 1937; he became a naturalised German citizen in 1940. Before and during World War II, he made English-language propaganda radio broadcasts and became one of several broadcasters associated with the nickname Lord Haw-Haw. After Germany's defeat, he was again imprisoned. He was released in 1949 and spent the remainder of his life in Ireland. He died in 1966.

In 1933, he became widely known as The Officer in the Tower as he was imprisoned in the Tower of London after his first arrest.

== Early life ==
Baillie-Stewart was born Norman Baillie Stewart Wright. His father was Lieutenant Colonel Cron Hope Baillie Wright (1875-1937) an officer in the British Indian Army who served in the 62nd Punjabis during the First World War. His mother was from a family with a long tradition of military service. His older brother, Eric Codrington Stewart Wright (1905-1987) also joined the army, and became a 2nd Lieutenant in the Loyal Regiment (North Lancashire) in 1925.

Wright attended Bedford School and the Britannia Royal Naval College, before attending the Royal Military College, Sandhurst, under a cadet scholarship. There, he served as an orderly to Prince Henry, a younger son of King George V.

In January 1929, just before he graduated, he changed his surname from Wright to Baillie-Stewart, perhaps under the belief that he was looked down upon by more senior officers. He graduated tenth in the order of merit and, in February 1929, received a commission as a subaltern in the Seaforth Highlanders, although he soon grew to dislike army life.

In 1929, Baillie-Stewart was posted to the Seaforth's Second Battalion in India. In 1930, he saw active service on the North West Frontier, where he was reprimanded by his company commander for removing a native banner from an Afridi tribal graveyard, which aggravated tensions with local tribesmen. He later replaced the banner on the orders of a senior officer.

A campaign medal was authorised for that campaign but Baillie-Stewart did not receive it. (Note: The roll of recipients compiled in September 1933, after his conviction, noted against his name, "No medal, forfeited. Cashiered".)

He returned to England in early 1931 after he had applied for transfer to the Royal Army Service Corps.

== Espionage career ==
In August 1932, the British Security service, MI5, became aware that a man claiming to be a British army officer had attempted to gain an interview at the German War Office in Berlin. The British embassy in Berlin tentatively identified the man as Norman Baillie-Stewart. Major William Hinchley-Cooke of MI5 was assigned to investigate the matter. (Note: Hinchley-Cooke would become a successful spy-catcher during World War 2.)

Hinchley-Cook searched Baillie-Stewart's quarters and began intercepting his mail; this revealed his communications with a German contact. During the autumn of 1932, Baillie-Stewart made three weekend trips to the Netherlands, briefly meeting a German contact in Rotterdam each time, although MI5 was initially unaware of this as they confined their investigation to intercepting his mail. In November 1932, MI5 opened a letter to him containing £50 in £5 banknotes. Baillie-Stewart replied with a letter to "Herr Obst" in Berlin. A second letter to Baillie-Stewart in December contained £40 in £10 notes.

In January 1933, it was decided to confront Baillie-Stewart with the gathered evidence, and offer him the chance to quietly resign from the army in exchange for information about his German contact. He refused this and so was charged with offences against the Official Secrets Act. Baillie-Stewart wrote a further letter to "Herr Obst" in Germany, describing his predicament. He gave the letter to his adjutant to post but the adjutant instead gave it to Major Hinchley-Cooke.

On 20 March 1933, Baillie-Stewart was taken to the Tower of London. The authorities believed this was the least-open military establishment in London and holding him there would help keep the matter out of the public eye. (See List of prisoners of the Tower of London.) However, this attempt at concealment backfired. The story of Baillie-Stewart's arrest was revealed in the press after the gossip columnist Barbara Cartland got the details from an acquaintance. The story of an officer from a prestigious regiment, facing the unprecedented charges of espionage and held in the famous Tower of London, quickly became a press sensation.

Baillie-Stewart's court-martial began at Chelsea Barracks on 20 March. He faced ten charges under the Official Secrets Act 1911 for selling military secrets to a foreign power; he pleaded not guilty to all of them. Britain was not at war so he was in no danger of execution, but the ten charges carried a maximum sentence of 140 years in jail.

The court was told that Baillie-Stewart began to offend in 1931 when he met and fell in love with a German woman while he was holidaying in Germany. He decided to become a German citizen and wrote a letter to the German Consul in London to offer his services. Receiving no answer, he travelled to Berlin (without permission to take leave) where he telephoned the German Foreign Ministry and demanded to talk to an English-speaker. That resulted in him making contact with a Major Mueller under the Brandenburg Gate, where he agreed to spy for Germany.

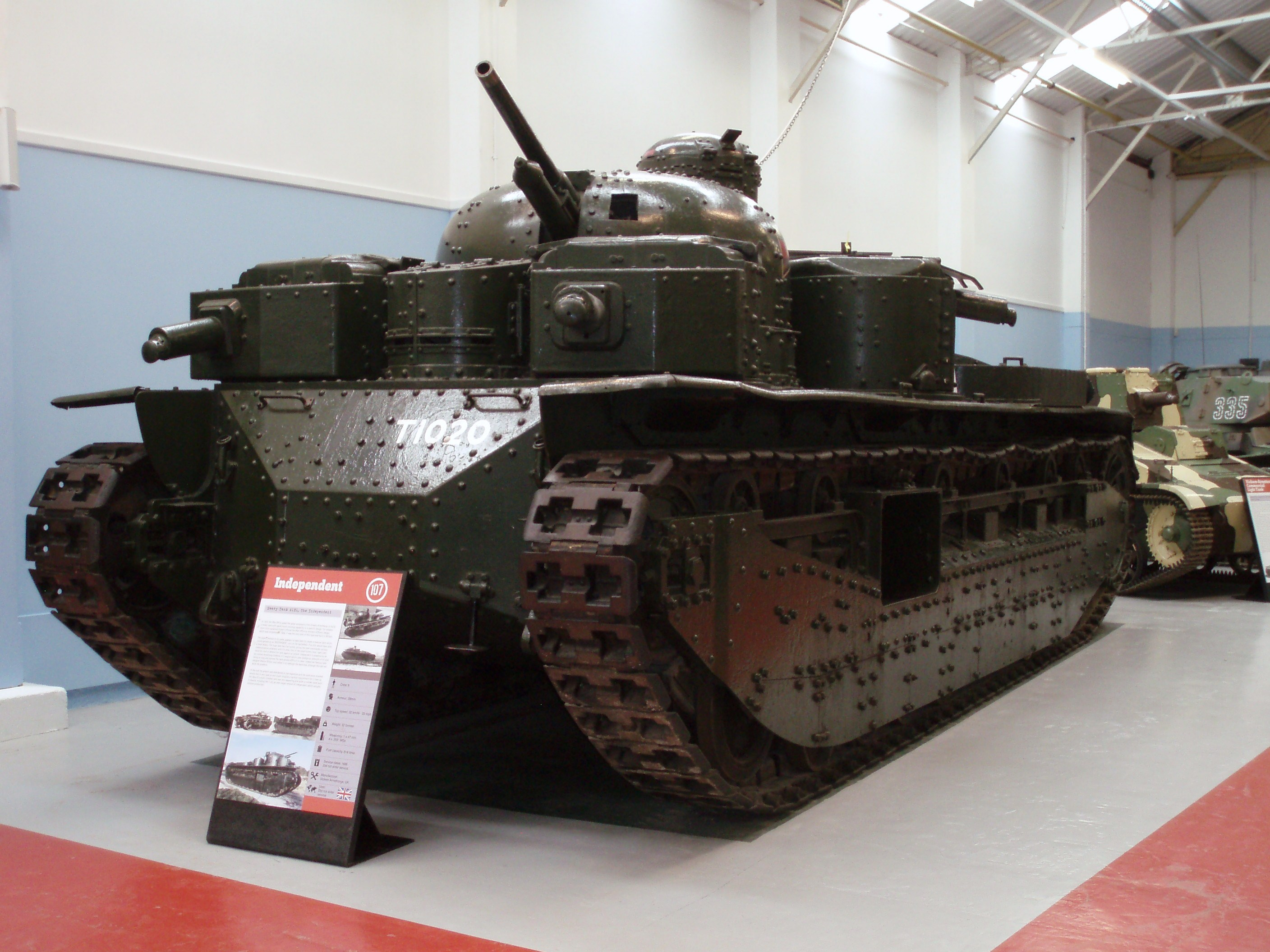
The Vickers A1E1 Independent tank, the only example built, now preserved at the Bovington Tank Museum (2010)

Using the pretext of studying for Staff College examinations, Baillie-Stewart borrowed from the Aldershot Military Library specifications and photographs of an experimental tank, the Vickers A1E1 Independent, as well as a new automatic rifle and notes on the organisation of tank and armoured car units. (Note: The Vickers A1E1 Independent was a large tank with five turrets; its experimental prototype was delivered in 1926. Several countries had an interest in multi-turret tanks during the Interwar period, and Germany produced the Neubaufahrzeug between 1934 and 1936. The Vickers Independent also provided inspiration for the Soviet T-35. Experience during the early part of the Second World War showed that such tanks generally performed poorly in combat.)

Baillie-Stewart was convicted of seven of the ten charges against him and was sentenced to cashiering and five-years in prison. Soon after, while held in Wormwood Scrubs, he was interviewed again by an MI5 officer and revealed that the Herr Obst he had addressed his letters to had been the cover-name of Major Muller ("Muller" was also likely a cover-name). Marie-Luise had been merely a figment of his controller's imagination. Baillie-Stewart's code-name was Poiret (little pear). That and Marie-Luise (a variety of pear) were names used to conceal the correspondence with Muller. Muller's cover name, Obst, was the German word for "fruit"

Baillie-Stewart was released from Maidstone Prison on 20 January 1937.

== German collaboration ==
In August 1937, eight months after his release from prison, Baillie-Stewart moved to Vienna, where he applied for Austrian citizenship; however, it was refused since he did not meet the residency qualification. In February 1938, the Austrian government, led by Kurt Schuschnigg, suspected him of being a Nazi agent and gave him three weeks to leave Austria. (Note: Before it was overthrown by the 1938 Anschluss, the authoritarian Austrofascist government of Austria was very hostile to German Nazism.) Officials at the British embassy in Vienna refused to help him once they learned who he was and Baillie-Stewart's disenchantment with Britain was increased. Rather than return to Britain he went to Bratislava, which was then in Czechoslovakia.

Following the Anschluss, Baillie-Stewart was able to return to Austria, where he made a modest living by operating a trading company. He applied for naturalisation, but the application was delayed by bureaucracy at the ministry, and he did not become a German citizen until 1940.

In July 1939, Baillie-Stewart attended a friend's party in which he happened to hear some German English-language propaganda broadcasts. He criticised the broadcasts and was overheard by a guest at the party who worked at the Austrian radio station. He informed his superiors of Baillie-Stewart's comments, and after a successful voice test in Berlin, Baillie-Stewart was ordered by the German Propaganda Ministry to report to the Reich Broadcasting Corporation (Reichsrundfunk) in Berlin, where he became a propaganda broadcaster in August 1939, taking over as chief broadcaster from Wolf Mittler. Baillie-Stewart made his first broadcast reading pro-Nazi news on the Germany Calling English-language service a week before the United Kingdom declared war on Germany.

It has been speculated that it was Baillie-Stewart who made the broadcast that led the pseudonymous Daily Express radio critic Jonah Barrington to coin the term "Haw-Haw". The nickname possibly referenced Baillie-Stewart's exaggeratedly aristocratic way of speaking, but Wolf Mittler is usually considered a more likely candidate. When William Joyce later became the most prominent Nazi propaganda broadcaster, Barrington appended the title and named Joyce "Lord Haw-Haw" since the true identity of the broadcaster was then unknown. Another nickname possibly applied to Baillie-Stewart was "Sinister Sam".

By the end of September 1939, it had been clear to the radio authorities that Joyce, originally Baillie-Stewart's backup man, was a more effective broadcaster. Baillie-Stewart had also become gradually disenchanted with the material that he was given to broadcast; his last radio broadcast was in December 1939 and he was dismissed shortly after. He continued to work in Berlin as a translator for the German Foreign Ministry and lectured in English at Berlin University. In early 1940, he acquired German citizenship.

In early 1942, Baillie-Stewart made a brief return to radio under the alias of "Lancer". He made several broadcasts for both the Reichsrundfunk and Radio Luxembourg. He spent much time avoiding the more blatant propaganda material he was asked to present. He translated to English the words of "Lili Marleen", which were sung by Lale Andersen as a form of propaganda towards Allied soldiers but then taken up strongly by the Allies themselves.

In 1944, Baillie-Stewart had himself sent to Vienna for medical treatment, where he was arrested in 1945 in Altaussee, while he was wearing "chamois leather shorts, embroidered braces and a forester's jacket", and was sent back to Britain to face charges of high treason.

== Postwar ==
Baillie-Stewart avoided execution only because the Attorney-General, Hartley Shawcross, did not think he could successfully try him on charges of high treason since he had German citizenship and instead decided to try him on the lesser charge of "committing an act likely to assist the enemy". The Security Service (MI5) reportedly lobbied for him to be sent to the Soviet occupation zone of Germany, where there would be no "namby-pamby legal hair-splitting".

In January 1946, Baillie-Stewart was charged under the 1939 Defence Regulations with aiding the enemy; he pleaded guilty and was sentenced to five years in prison. (Note: The depositions from his trial are available in the British National Archives under reference CRIM 1/1750.) He was released from HM Prison Parkhurst in May 1949. He moved to Ireland, where he lived under the pseudonyms of James Scott and Patrick Stuart.

In Ireland, he married and settled in the Dublin suburb of Raheny. He had two children before he died of a heart attack after collapsing at a pub in Harmonstown in June 1966. At the time of his death, he had just completed his autobiography, which he had co-written with John Murdock. This was posthumously published in 1967.

== Bibliography ==
- Baillie-Stewart, Norman; Murdoch, John (1967). The Officer in the Tower. London: Leslie Frewin. OCLC 955082.
- Murphy, Sean. Letting the Side Down: British Traitors of the Second World War, PP 50–60, 217–218. London: The History Press Ltd, 2005. ISBN 0-7509-4176-6
- West, Nigel (1982). MI5 : British security service operations, 1909-1945. New York : Stein and Day. ISBN 978-0-8128-2859-7.
- West, Rebecca (1949). "Chapter II: The Insane Root – John Amery and Norman Baillie-Stewart". The Meaning of Treason. London: Macmillan & Co Ltd.
- "Baillie-Stewart Trial." Times, London, England, 10 Jan. 1946: 2. The Times Digital Archive. Web. 20 Mar. 2015.
- "Baillie-Stewart Sentenced." Times, London, England, 11 Jan. 1946: 2. The Times Digital Archive. Web. 13 Apr. 2017.
