= Louise Botting =

British broadcaster (1939–2026)

Louise Botting CBE
- Born: Elizabeth Louise Young; 19 September 1939; Liverpool, England
- Died: 22 September 2026 (aged 87)
- Other name: Louise Carpenter
- Education: Sutton Coldfield High School for Girls; London School of Economics
- Occupations: Journalist; Radio presenter Businesswoman; Author
- Notable credit(s): Money Box (BBC Radio 4); Daily Mail; British Forces Broadcasting Service
- Children: Anna Botting

Elizabeth Louise Botting CBE (née Young; 19 September 1939 – 22 September 2026) was a British businesswoman and broadcaster. She was presenter of BBC Radio 4's Money Box programme between 1977 and 1992. After her broadcasting career, she became one of the first female directors of a FTSE 100 company, through her appointment to the board of CGNU (formerly General Accident, now Aviva). She has also held non-executive directorships of other companies such as Trinity Mirror, London Weekend Television and Camelot Group.

Botting founded the private wealth management firm Douglas Deakin Young in 1974, serving as its managing director and then chairman until it was sold to Duncan Lawrie in 2005. Over the years she had an extensive portfolio of business interests.

== Early life and professional career ==
Botting was born into a middle-class family in Liverpool on 19 September 1939. She attended Sutton Coldfield High School for Girls (now Sutton Coldfield Grammar School for Girls) and went on to the London School of Economics.

After her graduation in 1961 she joined the British merchant bank Kleinwort Benson as one of their first female analysts. Her marriage to the writer and explorer Douglas Botting led to a career break as she gave birth to her two daughters, Anna (now a newsreader with Sky News) and Kate. Her career in journalism started in 1970 when she began writing for the Daily Mail. She started broadcasting with British Forces Broadcasting Service in 1971 and continued to do this until 1981.

In 1974, she established the private wealth management firm Douglas Deakin Young, with the businessman George Douglas and John Deakin, a medical doctor. Her initial role was managing director, until her succession by Alan Warner in 1982, when she became chairman. She remained in this role until the firm was sold to Duncan Lawrie in 2005.

== Money Box ==
In 1977, Botting was asked to be the founding presenter of BBC Radio 4's Money Box. The aim of the programme was to make sensible personal financial advice available to ordinary people. The programme, which continues to be broadcast, covers a broad range of investment and tax issues, as well as covering major changes in social security. The popularity of Money Box increased, attracting up to three million listeners each week. Its political influence was highlighted by the fact that, at times, the Prime Minister's office asked to know the proposed content in advance.

By 1992, Botting wished to pursue other business interests and was asked to join the board of London Weekend Television. This appointment was unpalatable to the BBC, and she decided to resign from the programme. She was succeeded by Alison Mitchell.

== Later career ==
Botting pursued many other business interests. In addition to Douglas Deakin Young and London Weekend Television, she served as non-executive director of CGNU (formerly General Accident, now Aviva) and Trinity Mirror. She later remained a director of national lottery operator Camelot Group.

She also acted as a member of the Top Salaries Review Body between 1987 and 1994, and was rewarded by Prime Minister John Major with a CBE for her work and for services to journalism.

Her interests extended to local radio, with ownership of a number of different stakes. In 1995 she chaired the consortium that was awarded the new local radio licence for Stratford-upon-Avon, launching the following year as The Bear.

Botting also acted as professional pension trustee to Channel 4, Blackwell Publishing, W H Smith and the Institute of Practitioners in Advertising. After the sale of Douglas Deakin Young in 2005 to Duncan Lawrie, she stepped down as chairman and acted as a consultant.

She was a patron of APT Action on Poverty (registered charity no. 290836).

== Death ==
Botting died after a short illness on 22 September 2026, aged 87.

== Publications ==
- Making the most of your money (1984, 1985), with Vincent Duggleby
