= Sutton Coldfield Grammar School for Girls =

Location
- Jockey Road; Sutton Coldfield, Birmingham, West Midlands, B73 5PT; England; 52.554°N 1.83°W

Information
- Former names: Sutton Coldfield High School; Sutton Coldfield Girls School
- Type: Grammar school; Academy
- Motto: Not for Our Own Advantage, but for the Common Good
- Established: 18 September 1929; 96 years ago
- Local authority: Birmingham City Council
- Trust: Sutton Coldfield Grammar School for Girls Academy Trust
- Department for Education URN: 136778 Tables
- Ofsted: Reports
- Head teacher: Barbara Minards
- Gender: Girls
- Age range: 11–18
- Enrolment: 1,108 (2018)
- Capacity: 831
- Houses: Ursa; Delphinus; Phoenix; Cygnus; Pegasus; Aquila
- Colours: Navy blue and cream
- Website: www.suttcold.bham.sch.uk

Sutton Coldfield Grammar School for Girls (formerly Sutton Coldfield High School and Sutton Coldfield Girls School) is an 11–18 girls secondary grammar school and sixth form with academy status in Sutton Coldfield, Birmingham, West Midlands, England. It is a specialist Science College and a Leadership Partner School which it received in September 2004 and 2009 respectively, as well as a Beacon School. It became an academy in 2011.

== History ==
It was opened on 18 September 1929 as Sutton Coldfield High School. Plans for a school had begun in 1906 with sites behind Sutton Coldfield Town Hall, in Sutton Park and Rectory Park all being considered before a 6-acre (2.4 ha) field behind Beeches Walk was selected. It became Sutton Coldfield Girls School in 1962 and then changed its name to Sutton Coldfield Grammar School for Girls in the late 1990s. It is a partner school to Bishop Vesey's Grammar School which was founded in 1527.

In September 1972, there was no intake to the school as its entry age was increased from 11 to 12. However, the entry age was reverted to 11 from September 1992, when two-year groups (11- and 12-year-olds) were admitted to the school.

== Academic performance ==
The 2007 examination results were well above the national average in both GCSEs and A-levels. The school received outstanding in the 2007/2008 inspection.

== Notable former pupils ==
- Louise Botting, broadcaster from 1977 to 1992 of Radio 4's Money Box and company director
- Comdt Marjorie Fletcher, director from 1986 to 1988 of the Women's Royal Naval Service (WRNS, disbanded in 1993)
- Deborah Greenspan (née Scriven). Professor-Emerita of Oral Medicine, University of California, San Francisco, and President from 2006 to 2007 of the International Association for Dental Research
- Madeleine Rees, Secretary-General since 2010 of the Women's International League for Peace and Freedom
- Jane Rossington, actress who played Jill in Crossroads
- Louise Latimer, former British No. 1 women's tennis player
- Laura Unsworth, hockey player who was named in the 2012 Team GB Women's Hockey team, and part of the team that won gold at the 2016 Summer Olympics
- Dinita Gohil Actress
