= Marjorie Fletcher =

Commandant Marjorie Fletcher CBE
- Born: 21 September 1932
- Died: 11 October 2008 (aged 76)
- Military career
- Allegiance: United Kingdom
- Branch: Women's Royal Naval Service
- Service years: 1953–1988
- Rank: Commandant

Commandant Marjorie Fletcher CBE (21 September 1932 – 11 October 2008) served as Director of the Women's Royal Naval Service (WRNS) between 1986 and 1988.

== Career ==
Marjorie Fletcher was born on 21 September 1932. In her youth, she attended Avondale High School and Sutton Coldfield Grammar School for Girls. After leaving school she became a solicitor's clerk, and joined the Women's Royal Naval Service (WRNS) in 1953 as a rating with the post of telegraphist. She was commissioned as an officer and over the following two decades she was promoted from third officer to chief officer. Her postings including two tours in Malta, including one on the staff of the Commander-in-Chief of the Mediterranean Fleet.

Fletcher attended a NATO staff course in 1979, and became director of the naval staff college. She was then posted for three years to Nato headquarters in Brussels, Belgium. Afterwards Fletcher became the first WRNS officer to become director of the naval staff duties division in the Ministry of Defence. She was named director of the WRNS in 1986, and retired upon her departure from that post in 1988. Fletcher was subsequently named a Commander of the Order of the British Empire (CBE). Early in retirement she wrote a book on the history of the WRNS, The WRNS: A History of the Women's Royal Naval Service, published in 1989. Fletcher died on 11 October 2008.
