= Lord Haw-Haw =

Nickname applied to several Nazi propaganda broadcasters

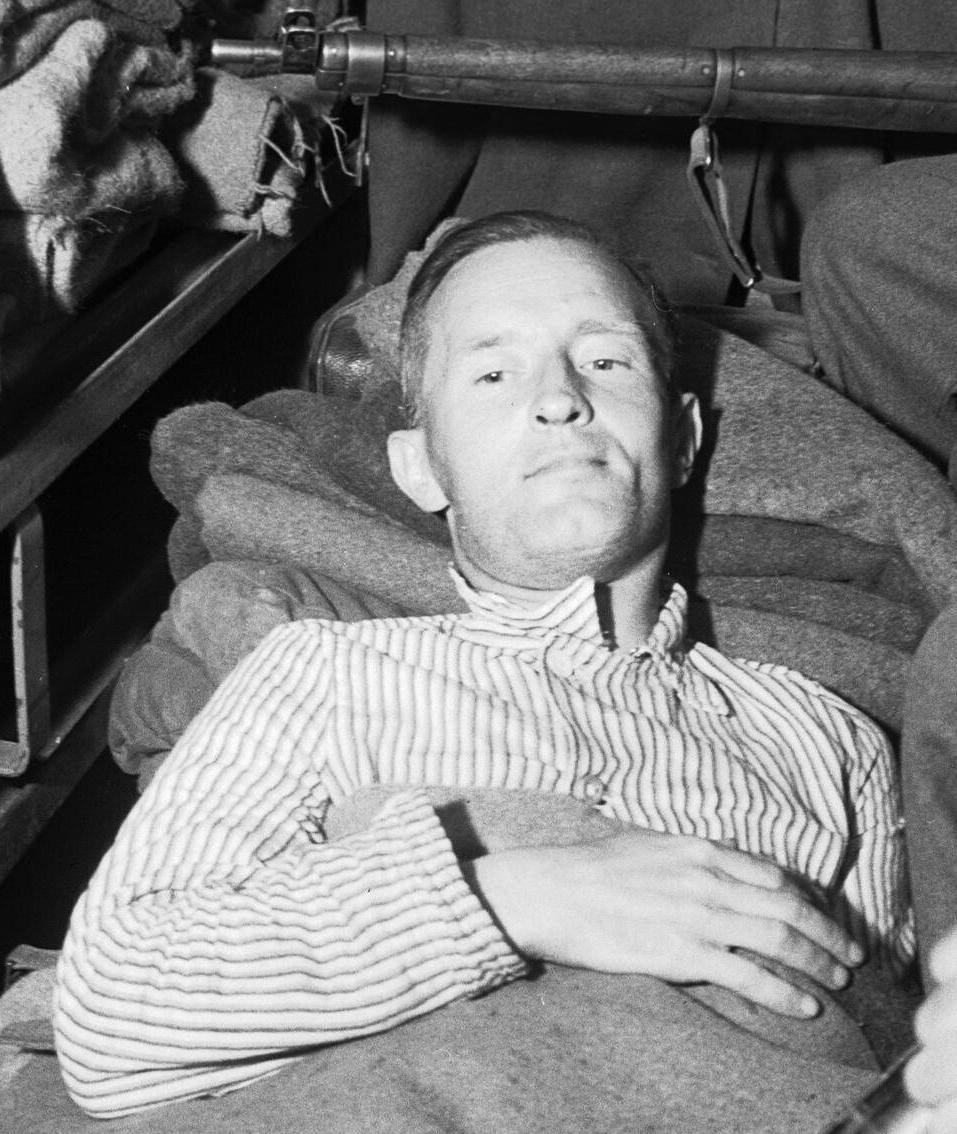
1945: William Joyce lies in an ambulance under armed guard before being taken from British Second Army Headquarters to a hospital.

Lord Haw-Haw was a nickname applied to William Joyce and several other people who broadcast Nazi propaganda to the United Kingdom from Germany during the Second World War. The broadcasts opened with "Germany calling, Germany calling," spoken in an affected upper-class English accent. Through such broadcasts, the Reich Ministry of Public Enlightenment and Propaganda tried to discourage and demoralise both Allied troops and the British population. Although the broadcasts were known to be Nazi propaganda, they often offered the only details of Allied troops and air crews caught behind enemy lines.

The nickname, coined by a reporter, was applied to other broadcasters of English-language propaganda from Germany, but it is Joyce with whom the name is overwhelmingly identified.

== Aim of Broadcasts ==
The English-language propaganda radio programme Germany Calling was broadcast to audiences in the United Kingdom on the medium wave station Reichssender Hamburg and by shortwave to the United States. The programme began on 18 September 1939 and continued until 30 April 1945, when the British Army overran Hamburg. The next scheduled broadcast was made by Horst Pinschewer (also known as Geoffrey Perry), a German-Jewish refugee serving in the British Army who announced the British takeover. Pinschewer was later responsible for the capture of William Joyce.

Through such broadcasts, the Reich Ministry of Public Enlightenment and Propaganda attempted to discourage and demoralise American, Australian, British, and Canadian troops, and the British population, to suppress the effectiveness of the Allied war effort through propaganda, and to motivate the Allies to agree to peace terms leaving the Nazi regime intact and in power. Among many techniques used, the Nazi broadcasts reported on the shooting down of Allied aircraft and the sinking of Allied ships, presenting discouraging reports of high losses and casualties among Allied forces.

Although the broadcasts were well known to be Nazi propaganda, they frequently offered the only details available from behind enemy lines concerning the fate of friends and relatives who did not return from bombing raids over Germany. As a result, Allied troops and civilians frequently listened to Lord Haw-Haw's broadcasts despite the often inflammatory content and frequent inaccuracies and exaggerations, in the hope of hearing clues as to the fate of Allied troops and air crews. Mass-Observation interviews warned the Ministry of Information of this; consequently, more attention was given to the official reports of British military casualties.

== Origin of the name ==
In a newspaper article of 14 September 1939, the radio critic Jonah Barrington of the Daily Express wrote of hearing a gent "moaning periodically from Zeesen" who "speaks English of the haw-haw, damit-get-out-of-my-way variety". Four days later, he gave him the nickname 'Lord Haw-Haw'. He wrote scathingly:

I imagine him having a receding chin, a questing nose, thin yellow hair brushed back, a monocle, a vacant eye, a gardenia in his buttonhole. Rather like PG Wodehouse's Bertie Wooster…

The voice Barrington heard is widely believed to be that of Wolf Mittler, a German journalist, whose almost flawless English accent sounded like that of a caricature of an upper-crust Englishman. However, Mittler made just five or six broadcasts and was quickly replaced by other speakers, leading to uncertainty over whom Barrington had meant. Some British media and listeners used the name "Lord Haw-Haw" for all English-language German broadcasters, although other nicknames, such as "Sinister Sam", were occasionally used by the BBC to distinguish among obviously different speakers. Poor reception may have contributed to some listeners' difficulties in distinguishing between broadcasters. By the end of 1939, when Joyce had become the most prominent and regular broadcaster of English-language Nazi propaganda, the name was applied exclusively to him. Indeed, the Germans soon capitalised on the publicity generated in Britain and began announcing Joyce's talks as by "William Joyce, otherwise known as Lord Haw-Haw".

In reference to the nickname, an American pro-Nazi broadcaster, Fred W. Kaltenbach, was nicknamed Lord Hee-Haw by the British media. The Lord Hee-Haw name was also used for a time by The Daily Telegraph to refer to Lord Haw-Haw, causing some confusion between nicknames and broadcasters.

== Announcers associated with the nickname ==
A number of announcers could have been Lord Haw-Haw:

- Wolf Mittler is widely believed to be the voice that Jonah Barrington originally wrote about, thus making Mittler the original 'Lord Haw-Haw'. Mittler, who was a German journalist, spoke almost flawless English, which he had learned from his mother, who had been born of German parents in Ireland. His persona was described by some listeners as similar to the fictional upper class Bertie Wooster. It was said that he found broadcasting political matters distasteful and that he was happy to be replaced. One of those who replaced him, Norman Baillie-Stewart, stated that Mittler "sounded almost like a caricature of an Englishman". Mittler told the BBC in 1991 that it "can't have been more than five or six times" that he made the broadcasts "because I remember quite distinctly that these two chaps, Stewart and Joyce, popped up and relieved me of the job". In 1943, Mittler was deemed suspect and arrested by the Gestapo, but he managed to escape to Switzerland. After the war, he worked extensively for German radio and television.
- Norman Baillie-Stewart was a former officer of the Seaforth Highlanders, who was cashiered for selling secrets to Nazi Germany. He worked as a broadcaster for the German broadcaster RRG between August and December 1939. He was imprisoned for five years by the British after the war. For a time he claimed that he was the original Lord Haw-Haw. He did have an upper-class accent, but he later concluded that it was probably Mittler whose voice Barrington had heard. He may, however, have been the broadcaster the BBC called "Sinister Sam".
- Eduard Dietze, a Glasgow-born broadcaster of a mixed German–British–Hungarian family background, is another possible, but less likely, candidate for the original Lord Haw-Haw. He was one of the English-speaking announcers with an "upper-crust accent" who were heard on German radio in the early days of the war.
- James R. Clark was a young English broadcaster and a friend of William Joyce. Clark and his pro-Nazi mother, Dorothy Eckersley, were both tried for treason after the war. Dorothy Eckersley was born Dorothy Stephen in 1893. She later married Edward Clark, a musician, and had a son, James Clark, who was born in 1923. She divorced her first husband and was married to Peter Eckersley, a senior figure working in the British Broadcasting Corporation (BBC). After ten years of marriage to Peter Eckersley, Dorothy's increasing interest in German National Socialism and fascism led her to move to Germany with her son, enrolling him (by then aged 17 years) in a German school. After this move, "Dorothy Eckersley came to play a key role in William Joyce's fate in Berlin".

=== William Joyce ===
William Joyce replaced Mittler in 1939. Joyce was American-born and raised in Ireland, and as a teenager he was an informant to the British forces about the IRA members during the Irish War of Independence. He was also a senior member of the British Union of Fascists, and fled England when tipped off about his planned internment on 26 August 1939. In October 1939, the British Fascist newspaper Action identified "one of the subsidiary announcers" on German radio, "with a marked nasal intonation", as one of its former members and distanced itself from him as a "renegade", whose broadcasts were "likely only to rouse the fighting ire of the average Briton".

In February 1940, the BBC noted that the Lord Haw-Haw of the early war days (possibly Mittler) was now rarely heard on the air and had been replaced by a new spokesman. Joyce was the main German broadcaster in English for most of the war, and became a naturalised German citizen; he is usually regarded as Lord Haw-Haw, even though he was probably not the person first so called. He had a peculiar hybrid accent that was not of the conventional upper-class variety. His distinctive nasal pronunciation of "Germany calling, Germany calling" may have been the result of a fight as a schoolboy that left him with a broken nose.

Joyce, initially an anonymous broadcaster like the others, eventually revealed his real name to his listeners. The Germans capitalised on the fame of the Lord Haw-Haw nickname and came to announce him as "William Joyce, otherwise known as Lord Haw-Haw".

== Later history and aftermath ==
After Joyce took over, Mittler was paired with the American-born announcer Mildred Gillars in the Axis Sally programme and also broadcast to ANZAC forces in North Africa.

Baillie-Stewart was sentenced to five years' imprisonment.

Joyce was captured by British forces in northern Germany just as the war ended, tried, and eventually hanged for treason on 3 January 1946. Joyce's defence team, appointed by the court, argued that, as an American citizen and naturalised German, Joyce could not be convicted of treason against the British Crown. However, the prosecution successfully argued that, since he had lied about his nationality to obtain a British passport and voted in Britain, Joyce owed allegiance to the king.

In Haw-Haw: The Tragedy of William and Margaret Joyce, the author Nigel Farndale presents evidence that shows that, during his trial, Joyce may have agreed not to reveal his pre-war links with Maxwell Knight, the head of the MI5 section B5(b), as part of a deal to spare his wife Margaret, a Germany Calling broadcaster known as Lady Haw-Haw, from prosecution for treason.

As J. A. Cole has written, "the British public would not have been surprised if, in that Flensburg wood [where he was captured], Haw-Haw had carried in his pocket a secret weapon capable of annihilating an armoured brigade". This mood was reflected in the wartime film Sherlock Holmes and the Voice of Terror (1942), starring Basil Rathbone and Nigel Bruce, in which Joyce's broadcasts are shown to predict actual disasters and defeats, thus, according to the storyline, seriously undermining British morale.

== Other British subjects who broadcast ==
Other British subjects willingly made propaganda broadcasts, including Raymond Davies Hughes, who broadcast on the German Radio Metropole, and John Amery. P. G. Wodehouse was tricked into broadcasting, not propaganda, but rather his own satiric accounts of his capture by the Germans and civil internment as an enemy alien, by a German friend who assured him that the talks would be broadcast only to the neutral United States. They were, however, relayed to the UK on a little-known channel. An MI5 investigation, conducted shortly after Wodehouse's release from Germany, but published only after his death, found no evidence of treachery.

== In literature and the arts ==
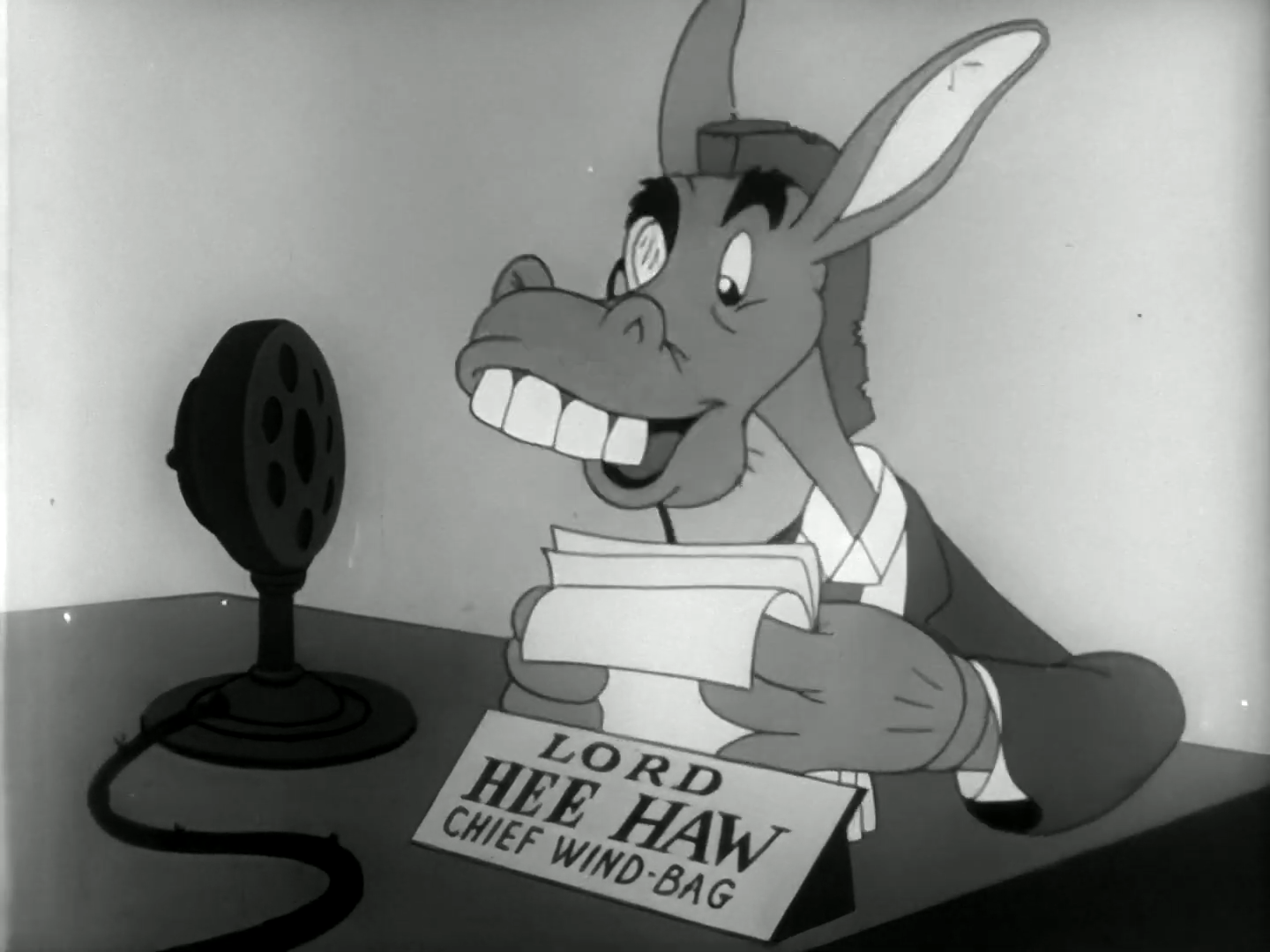
"Lord Hee Haw, Chief Wind-Bag" from the 1943 animated propaganda film Tokio Jokio

=== Film ===
- In the 1940s, actor Geoffrey Sumner played Lord Haw-Haw for laughs in a series of Pathé Gazette short subjects named "Nasti" News From Lord Haw-Haw.
- The 1942 film Sherlock Holmes and the Voice of Terror concerns a sinister radio broadcaster delivering propaganda and fake news, apparently from Germany. He turns out to be an impostor working within the inner British Council, given away only by the nature of his facial scar.
- The 1943 animated propaganda cartoon Tokio Jokio has a brief sequence with an anthropomorphic donkey wearing a monocle, seated at a desk with a sign reading "Lord Hee Haw, Chief Wind Bag", as he reads from a script into a microphone.
- The 1944 film Passport to Destiny features a character played by Gavin Muir as Herr Joyce/Lord Haw, based on William Joyce as Lord Haw-Haw.
- In the movie Twelve O'Clock High (1949), American bomber commanders listen to a Lord Haw-Haw broadcast.
- In the movie The Dirty Dozen (1967) a brief portion of a Lord Haw-Haw broadcast is heard.
- In the movie The Thousand Plane Raid (1969) a fictitious Lord Haw-Haw broadcast is heard in which Haw-Haw reveals details of the titular raid before it takes place.
- In the movie Sardar Udham (2021), a Lord Haw-Haw broadcast announces the assassination of Michael O'Dwyer.

=== Literature ===
- In the novels Flashman (1969) and Flashman at the Charge (1973), from the series of historical novels by George MacDonald Fraser, the main character Harry Flashman refers to James Brudenell, 7th Earl of Cardigan, who led the disastrous Charge of the Light Brigade, as "Lord Haw-Haw" due to his tendency to sprinkle his conversation with the phrase "haw-haw". The Earl was noted as using the phrase in real life.
- The main character of Kurt Vonnegut's Mother Night (1962), Howard W. Campbell Jr., is a Nazi propagandist modeled after Lord Haw-Haw.
- Christianna Brand's detective novel Green for Danger, set in a military hospital during World War II, includes a plot point where certain characters had been trapped during a bombing raid, and heard pro-German propaganda broadcast on the radio; later, other characters speculated about the identity of the broadcaster, with several mentions of Lord Haw-Haw.
- In the 1964 English novel, The Valley of Bones, part of Anthony Powell's epic work, A Dance to the Music of Time, narrator Lt Nick Jenkins overhears soldiers listening to a Haw Haw broadcast on the company store wireless late at night. "Someone in the store turned the button. The nagging, sneering, obsessive accents died away with a jerk, as if a sack had been advantageously thrust over the speaker's head, bestowing an immediate sense of relief at his extinction." Powell actually creates a page of running patter which mimics a Haw Haw script. (Little, Brown and Company, 52-54.)
- The fourth issue of the American comic book series Sgt. Fury and his Howling Commandos, by Jack Kirby and Stan Lee (1963), features Lord Ha-Ha, a pro-Nazi British broadcaster. Unlike William Joyce, Lord Ha-Ha is a British aristocrat, Sir Percival Hawley.

== Theatre ==
- A comedy revue, Haw-Haw!, produced by George Black with sketches by Max Miller and Ben Lyon, opened at the Holborn Empire theatre in London on 22 December 1939.
- Joyce's radio broadcasts and his relationship with his wife were dramatised in the stage play Double Cross (1983), by Thomas Kilroy. Stephen Rea played the role of Joyce.
- Jim Blythe's stage play Haw Haw: A Very British Betrayal opened at Hope Street Theatre, Liverpool on 1 November 2023. Produced by Matter of Act Theatre Company, the play starred Toby Harris as William Joyce, and Simon Futty as Gerald Slade KC. The play was directed by Dave Baxter.
- John B. Keane's The Crazy Wall (1973) features Lord Haw Haw as an unseen character throughout the play.

== See also ==
- List of English-language broadcasters for Nazi Germany
- Axis Sally
- British Free Corps
- Hanoi Hannah
- Tokyo Rose

== Notes ==
Bibliography

- Doherty, M. A (2000). "Organisation of Nazi Wireless Propaganda". Nazi wireless propaganda: Lord Haw-Haw and British public opinion in the Second World War. Edinburgh: Edinburgh University Press. ISBN 0-7486-1363-3.
- Farndale, Nigel (2005). Haw-Haw: The Tragedy of William and Margaret Joyce. Macmillan ISBN 0-333-98992-9
- Stourton, Edward (2015). Auntie's War. Doubleday. ISBN 9780857523327.
- Wharam, Alan (1995). Treason: Famous English Treason Trials. Alan Sutton Publishing. ISBN 978-0-7509-0991-4.
