= Duncan Lawrie =

Small private bank in UK

Duncan Lawrie Ltd
- Type: Limited
- Industry: Private banking, financial planning and wealth management
- Founded: 1860
- Headquarters: Belgravia, London, England, UK
- Products: Wealth management – accounts, lending, savings
- Number of employees: c 250
- Parent: Camellia Group
- Website: Official website

Duncan Lawrie Limited, known simply as Duncan Lawrie, was a small private bank with its head office in Belgravia, London. Founded in 1971, the bank offered a bespoke service, with an emphasis on a personal relationship, to high-net-worth individuals. It is in the process of winding down its operations.

== History ==
The bank is now 100% owned by Camellia Plc, but it can trace its origins back to two Scottish businessmen, Alexander Lawrie and Walter Duncan, who travelled to Calcutta in the mid-19th century to make their fortunes as general merchants. Their businesses were merged in 1967.

The bank has several offices across the United Kingdom, including a branch in Bristol, a country estate in Kent, and an international banking, investment and fiduciary business in the Isle of Man as well as its head office in Belgravia, London.

== Clientele ==
While the bank places emphasis on confidentiality and never reveals its clientele, it is widely believed that numerous aristocrats, politicians, entrepreneurs and media figures hold accounts with the bank.

== Services ==
Duncan Lawrie predominantly holds accounts for high-net-worth individuals. Along with daily banking requirements, Duncan Lawrie also offers Trust and Estate Planning, Financial Planning, Investment Management and International Services from their Isle of Man office. In 2005 the bank purchased Douglas Deakin Young, and in 2007 it acquired Hill Martin and Hill Martin Asset Management.

== Charitable Support ==
The Bank supplies financial services for several large charities.
