= David Duggleby =

Auction house of fine art, jewellery and antiques

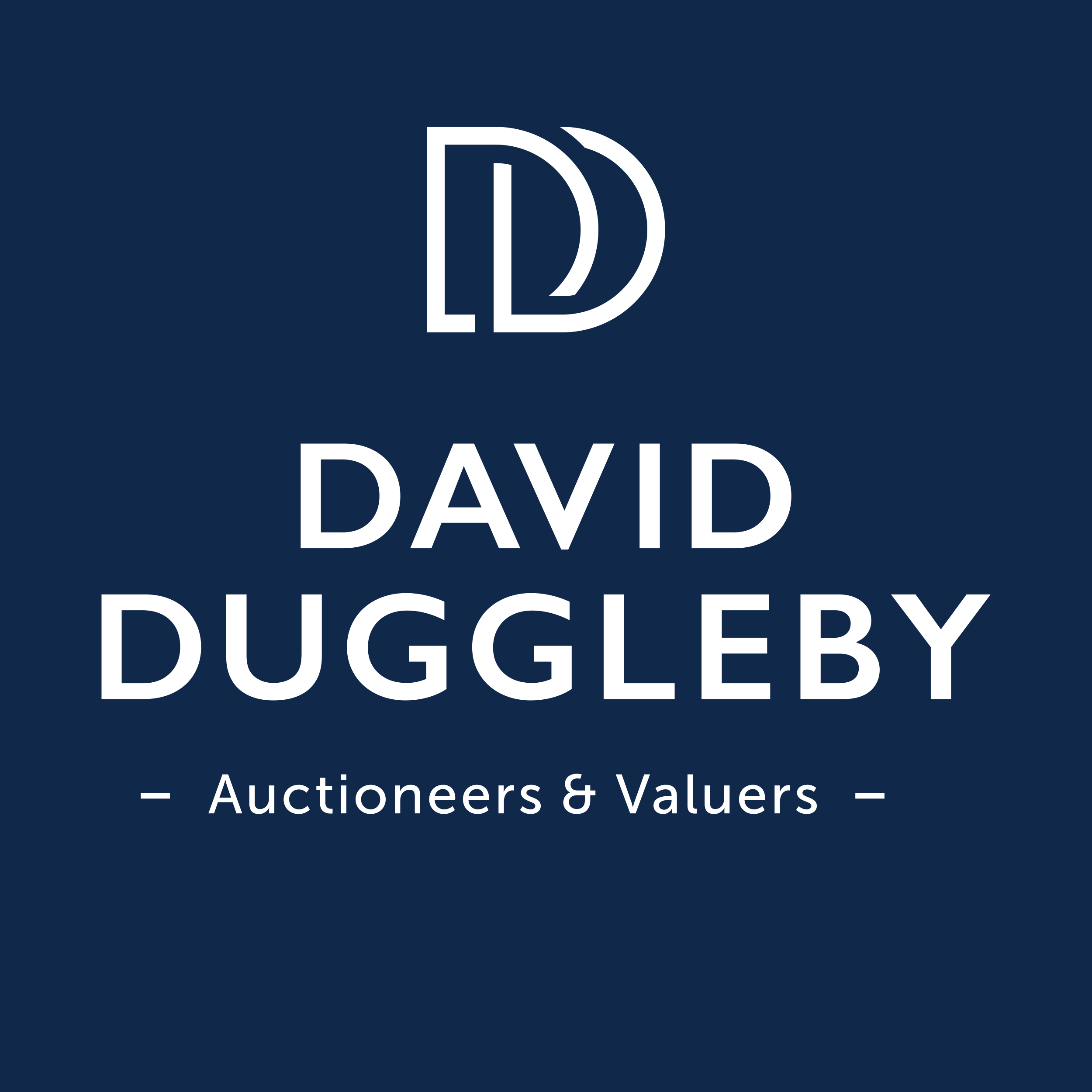
- Type: Private
- Industry: Auctions, Valuations, Antiques, Art, Jewellery
- Founded: c. 1996
- Headquarters: Scarborough, England
- Area served: Worldwide
- Products: Fine arts, Jewellery, Antique Furniture, Mouseman & Yorkshire Oak, Rare coins, Stamps, Toys & Model Railways, Militaria
- Website: davidduggleby.com

David Duggleby Auctioneers & Valuers is a British auction house incorporated in 2002 with headquarters in Scarborough, North Yorkshire. The business was founded by Jane and David Duggleby and is currently run by MD William Duggleby. The company is one of Yorkshire's largest brokers of antiques, fine and decorative art, jewellery, and collectibles and has five locations: Scarborough, Beverley, Harrogate, Whitby and York. It is part of the Duggleby Group, which has roots in the removals and storage industry.

== History ==
David Duggleby Auctioneers & Valuers was established in 1996 in Scarborough by David and Jane Duggleby. Under William Duggleby, the auction house extended its activities online using the Saleroom and more recently DD live to reach an international audience.

In 2020, David Duggleby Auctioneers & Valuers introduced its own proprietary online system, which allows bidders to bid real-time online while watching the broadcast auctions. It holds valuations days across the UK for people in rural areas, and those not active online.

== Locations and Facilities ==
David Duggleby Auctioneers & Valuers is headquartered in Scarborough, North Yorkshire, where its main office and Vine Street Salerooms serve as the central hub for its operations. The Scarborough salerooms encompass 10,000 square feet, providing dedicated viewing areas for catalogued auctions and secure facilities for item storage, consignment drop-off, pre-sale viewing, and in-person bidding.

The company has opened additional valuation offices. The Beverley Valuation Office, established in 2018, is situated at Wednesday Market. It offers free appraisals, advice, and hosts previews for forthcoming fine art sales. In 2023, David Duggleby expanded into Harrogate, launching a second valuation office in the town centre to provide further regional coverage.

To expand into York the company formed Duggleby Stephenson in partnership with Stephensons. This venture operates out of a purpose-built showroom at the York Auction Centre in Murton. The York site includes exhibition and viewing areas, providing space for regular auctions of fine art, antiques, and specialist collections.

Alongside its auction operations, the broader Duggleby Group manages Movers & Storers branches located in Scarborough, Hornsea, and Wetherby, which support logistics for house clearances, national item collection and delivery, and secure storage.

== Notable auctions ==
The following monetary values are given in Great British Pounds (£).

- On 28 July 2024, Jack Rigg, a 20th century marine artist artwork sold for £20,000.
- On 12 July 2024, an original piece dated 1959 by 20th century British abstract artist Patrick Heron CBE of Leeds was priced for £10,000.
- On 10 May 2024, The picture, called 'White and Naked', painted by the great American jazz trumpeter Miles Davis of Alton, Illinois was priced for £12,000.
- On 26 January 2024, a rare firearm made by George Wallis of Hull was sold for £1,800.
- On 15 September 2023, L. S. Lowry's painting of a Salford square was sold for £7,400.
- On 17 March 2023, Harold Sutton Palmer's watercolour painting titled 'Richmond from the East' of dimensions 17 cm x 27 cm was sold for £1,300.
- On 17 March 2023, Júlio Pomar's painting 'Don Quixote', oil on canvas signed and dated 1961, titled on typed label verso 64 cm x 49 cm was sold for £23,000.
- On 17 September 2022, The Country House Sale, a bronze horse upon a stone plinth, 'Arab Horse Aslan' (1985) was sold for £23,000.
- On 17 September 2022, in the manner of a Thomas Chippendale - mahogany tripod wine table was sold for £5,600.
- On 26 August 2022, a 19th century Purdey 12-bore side-by-side double barrel black powder hammer gun made by the London gunmaker James Purdey for Thomas Powys, 4th Baron Lilford, a Victorian aristocrat, was sold for £1,500.
- On 7 November 2020, a set of 12 George III's silver dinner plates by Thomas Heming, London 1769, was sold for £7,000.
- On 6 November 2020, Dorothea Sharp's oil painting called 'On the Beach' Square was sold for £16,500.
- On 5 February 2005, a Victorian corkscrew with brass stem and turned bone handle by Robert Jones and Son, Birmingham, dated 8 October 1840 was sold for £1,000.
- On 10 April 2000, a collection of 42 holiday snaps by David Hockney OM, were sold for £8,000.
