= Norddeich radio station =

Former coastal radio station in East Frisia, Lower Saxony, Germany

Norddeich Radio
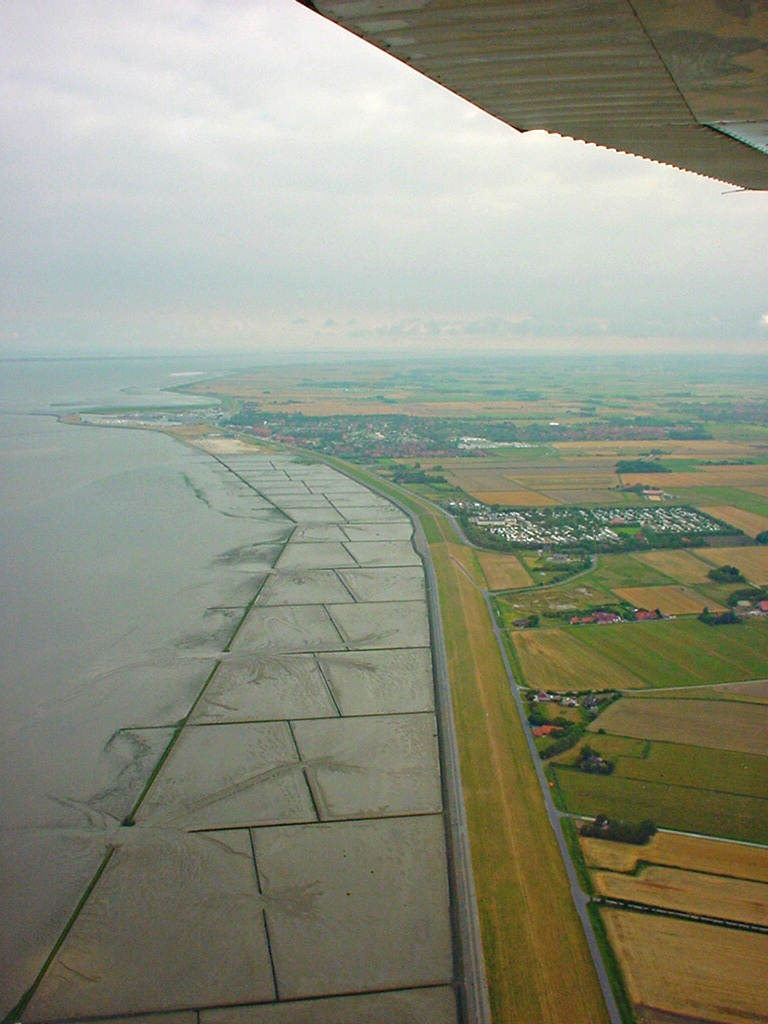
- Norddeich coastline in 2003. Norddeich Radio was built at this marshy area because of good ground conditions for the physical counterpoise for the antennas.
- Interactive map of Norddeich Radio
- 53°36′15″N 07°08′19″E
- Location: Osterloog, Norddeich
- Nearest city: Norden, Lower Saxony, Germany

History
- Built: 1907
- Built for: German Imperial Navy
- Original use: Coast radio station

Site notes
- Elevation: 65 m (213 ft)

Norddeich Radio, DAN (former call signs KND, KAV, DAF) was the coast radio station for international communication to German ships. The station was built in 1907 in Norddeich, Lower Saxony. Radio communications were carried out with ships all over the world for around 90 years.

It also served as a radio station during the National Socialist period and disseminated Nazi propaganda for English-speaking countries. On 31 December 1998, the station finally shut down.

== History ==
The station was originally going to set up on the Island of Borkum but in the end Norddeich (now part of the coity of Norden) was chosen. Historians assume today that the station was founded with the intention of being able to communicate with German warships in the western area of the German Bight up to the English Channel. In 1907 Norddeich Radio started its operation with a Telefunken spark-gap transmitter and an antenna suspended from four masts 65 m high as Funkentelegraphenstation Norddeich. In the early days, distances of more than 1500 km could be bridged at the frequency of 150 kHz.

In 1910, it began to broadcast a time signal along with the broadcast tower on the Eiffel Tower. As technology improved it was involved in a number of record-breaking transmissions including the 1912 record-breaking distance of 2,400 miles (3,900 km) by radio signals.

=== World War I ===
The station was placed under the command of the Imperial Navy during World War I. During the war there was almost no more civilian radio traffic. The station was used for communication to German Airships and submarines. The Navy cleared the station in November 1918. As a result of the German Revolution of 1918–1919 the station was occupied by members of a workers' and soldiers' council (Arbeiter- und Soldatenrat). The station remained occupied for a year till the uprisings were bloodily shot down by nationalist militias.

It was not until 1919 that operations slowly started up again. The facility was expanded and modernized in the 1920s. Telephony operation was introduced. The new tube transmitters were more powerful and could easily bridge distances of over 6000 km.

The simultaneous transmission and reception of radio signals in the same place caused increasing problems. In 1923 it was decided to set up a separate receiving station in the Norden suburb of Westgaste, three kilometers away. However, there was interference from devices in the surrounding houses and courtyards. The receiving station was therefore relocated to Utlandshörn, far away from any settlements, and was in operation in December 1931.

=== World War II ===
In Nazi Germany the station was used by Kriegsmarine and during the World War II, the facility was under military command and protection because it had to fulfill "vital war tasks". As in the World War I, Norddeich Radio was strategically important for the coordination of the naval units of the Kriegsmarine.

All German ships at sea received – openly or hidden – news of the impending start of the war and thus their threat. This messages were sent by Norddeich Radio as a so-called "QWA“-message, a Q-Code created by the Nazis for political-strategic messages.

From the autumn of 1939, a new Norddeich Radio facility transmitted the English-language propaganda program "Germany Calling" for foreign countries. The transmitter was camouflaged as "Reichssender Bremen" or initially "Studio facility of the experimental transmission system N". The transmitter was used in the Medium wave band on 759 and 904 kHz, later on 658 kHz.

Although the position of Norddeich Radio was known to the Allies, the transmitting station was not attacked. After the war, British pilots reported that the station was not destroyed because it enabled British reconnaissance to determine the position of German ships worldwide.

Toward the end of the war, the previously undamaged plant was to be blown up by the operating staff. That did not happen.

=== In FR Germany ===
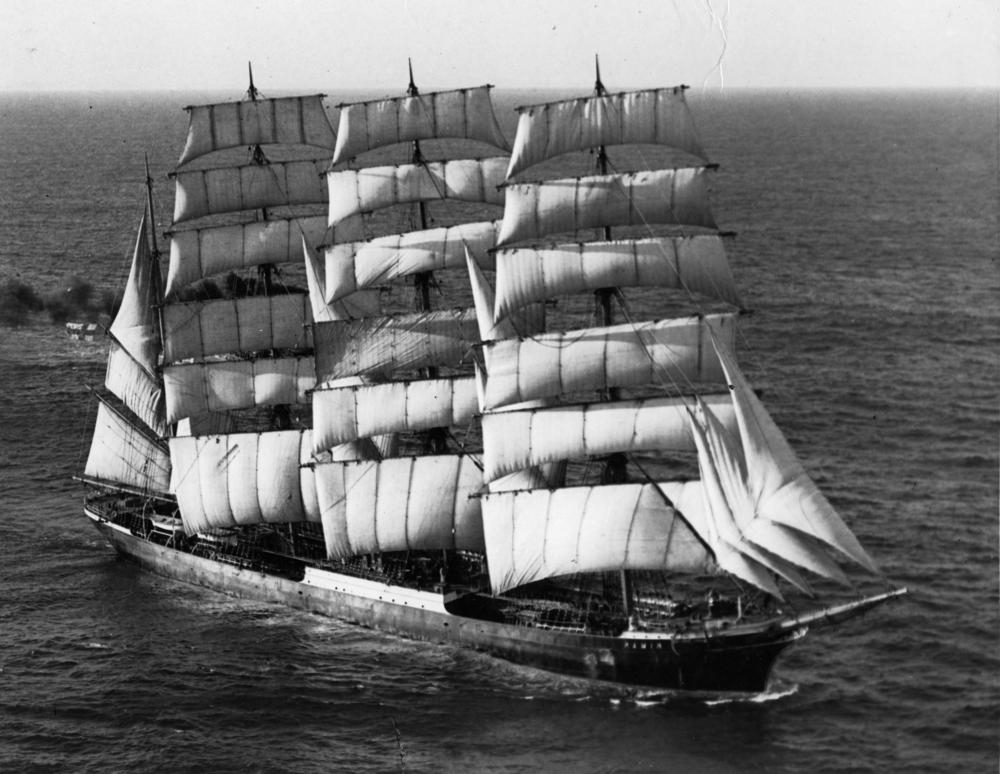
In September 1957, Norddeich radio received the emergency call from the sail training ship Pamir from North Atlantic. The ship became caught in a hurricane and sank. Norddeich Radio coordinated the SAR operation. Six people out of an 86 crew were rescued.

Norddeich Radio became the coast radio station of Deutsche Bundespost, later Deutsche Telekom the authority for radio communication in FRG. The civil main task was the connection to ships at sea for the normal postal service and the safety radio service. Further expansion followed in the 1950s. Norddeich Radio set up systems in Cuxhaven and Elmshorn that were remote-controlled in the 1970s.

The middle of the 1970s was the most successful time for the coast radio station: the "Coast Radio Station Osterloog" of the "Hamburg Radio Office" of the Deutsche Bundespost had 180 employees and operated 41 transmitters. Around 1,000 telegrams and 300 long-distance calls were sent every day. The telegrams could be posted at any post office in Germany. Around 35,000 additional Christmas greetings were added at Christmas.

As a result of the expansion of available satellite technology, which could be used to dial up connections to almost all telephone connections worldwide, the coast radio station increasingly lost its original function from the 1980s. At the beginning of the 1990s, the majority of ships were already equipped with communication facilities for satellite communication.

Since the mid-1990s, the various services have been gradually phased out. The station was shut down on 31 December 1998.

After the end of the marine radio station, the operations center in Utlandshörn was used by T-Mobile as a call center and administration center for some years.

== Technology ==
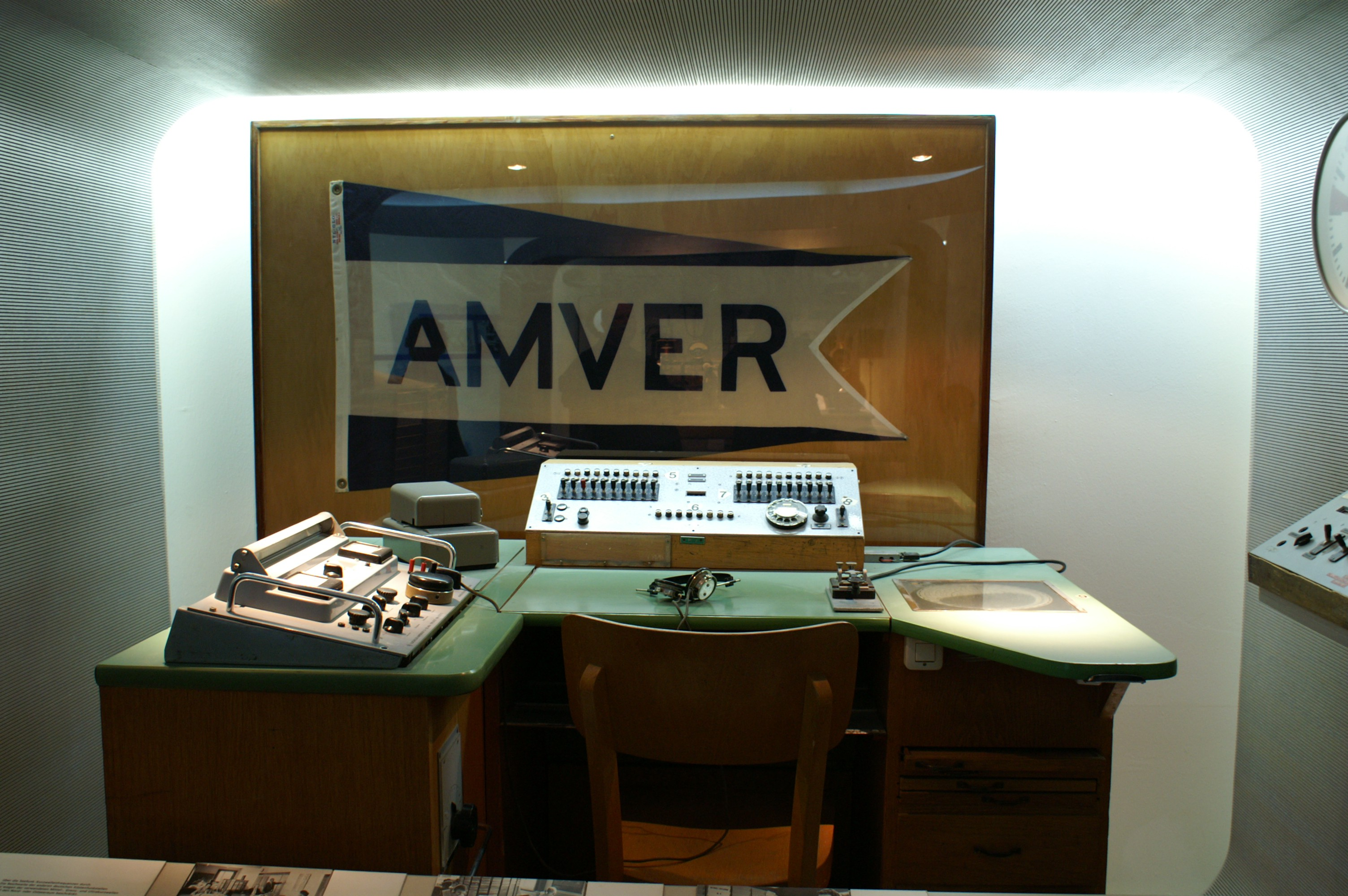
Workplace for radio operator, 1957

The transmitting modes used by Norddeich Radio reflected the development of HF-technology and transmission modes over the decades. Morse telegraphy (cw) was used up from 1907 to 1997. A special characteristic was the long-standing use of the Hellschreiber technology for exchanging facsimile.

The antennas stand at about 213.25 feet (65.00 m) high. Vessels returning from North America could communicate with Germany from far out in the Atlantic once they passed 12 degrees west of Greenwich.

In the mid-1970s, the technical equipment consisted of six short-wave transmitters and six antennas that could be adapted for lower short wave (1,6-,3,8 MHz) and short-wave (3,8–30 MHz). Four 65 m high steel lattice masts and two rotatable directional beam antennas were available for the medium wave range. The transmitters were located in Osterloog and were remotely controlled from the operations center in Utlandshörn.

== Historical club ==
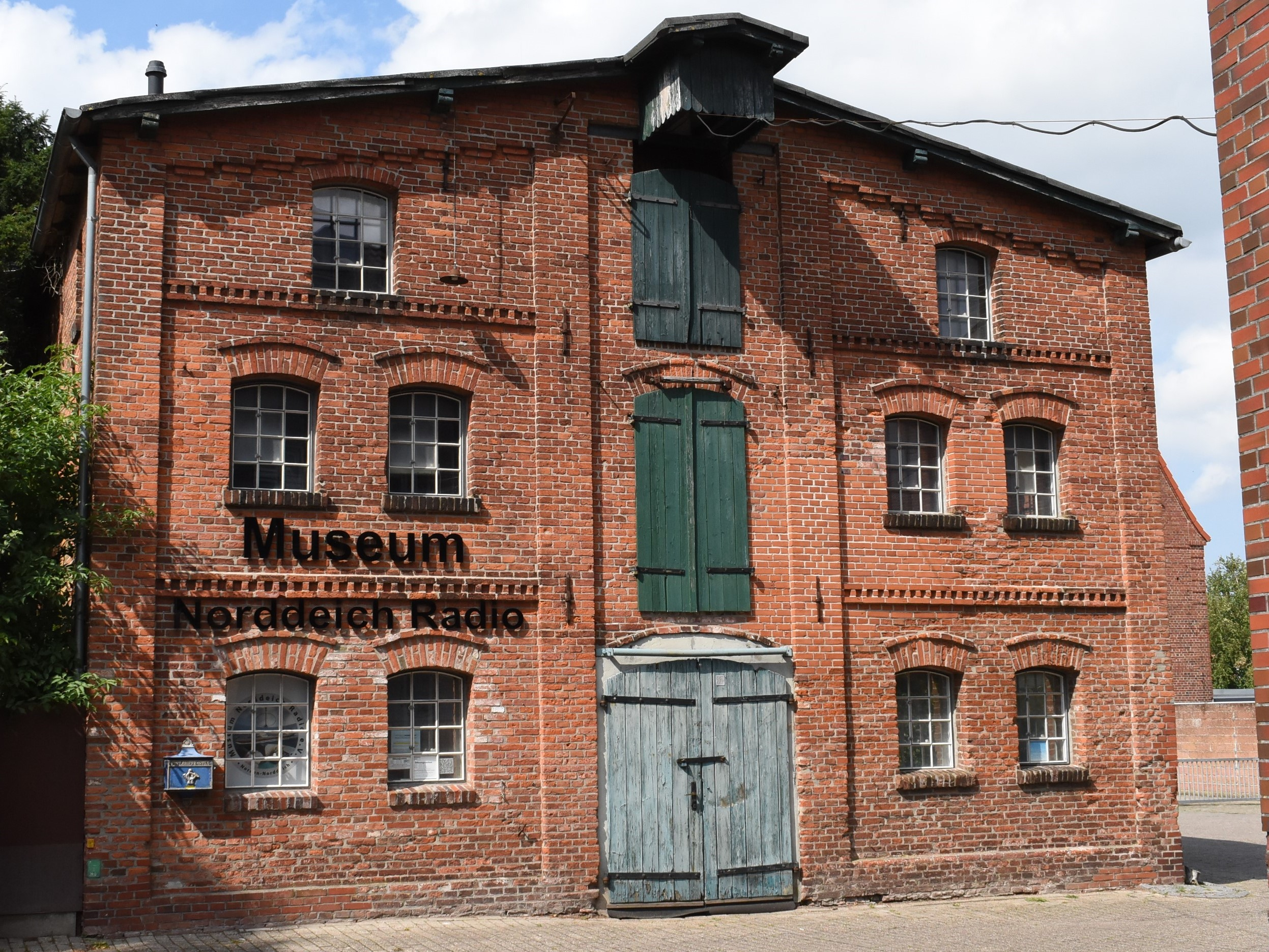
Norddeich Radio Museum in Norden, Germany

Some older employees and radio enthusiasts founded a club "Museum Norddeich Radio e. V" in 2011. They rented a house in Norden, which is protected as a cultural heritage and built up as a museum. The Museum Norddeich Radio is preserving and exhibiting the history of Norddeich Radio.
