= Wolf Mittler =

German radio host (1918–2002)

- Born: 1 January 1918; Munich, German Empire
- Died: 11 November 2002 (aged 84); Munich, Germany
- Occupations: Radio personality, Journalist
- Employers: Reichs-Rundfunk-Gesellschaft; Bayerischer Rundfunk

Wolf Müller-Mittler (1 January 1918 – 11 November 2002) was a German radio host and journalist. He was one of the persons associated with the nickname Lord Haw-Haw during World War II, though he only recorded half a dozen propaganda sessions in 1939. He has been described by one author as "a blond Polish-German Anglophile playboy". After the war he worked for Bavarian Radio, translating foreign broadcasts and conducting interviews.

== Early life ==
Wolf Müller-Mittler was born in Munich on 1 January 1918 (some sources report 1914). His maternal grandfather had been born in Königsberg, Prussia, but for much of his life lived in Ireland, where Mittler's mother was born. His father was a legal expert who, after the First World War, represented the Bavarian government in the Geneva Red Cross negotiations on the release and exchange of prisoners-of-war. Mittler was bilingual, his near-flawless English having been learned from his mother.

When his parents separated, he followed his mother to Berlin and, on her remarriage, began work in his stepfather's insurance company. During the summer of 1935, however, Mittler resigned and was hired as a cabin boy, along with a friend, by a Hamburg shipping company. He later wrote a travel piece which he placed with the Berliner Tageblatt. The item was noticed by the chief of the local United Press office, and he was invited to join the operation, collating reports from all over the world for distribution in Germany and neighbouring countries.

== German propaganda broadcasting ==
In late 1937, Mittler joined the national German broadcaster, Reichs Rundfunk GmbH (RRG), as a reporter and announcer. He worked for the short-wave station Deutsche Kurzwellensender (KWS) and was a natural choice for English-language broadcasts. However, when the programmes acquired a more overtly political slant in about September 1939, Mittler found himself reluctantly acting as an English-language propagandist for Nazi achievements and goals. "It can't have been more than five or six times", he told Denys Blakeaway, when interviewed for BBC Radio 4 in 1991. In his autobiography Mittler recalled:

Soon after the outbreak of war, the Propaganda Ministry decided to beam anti-British propaganda to Britain on medium wave. I was supposed to take part as one of the speakers, and was told it would be starting very soon. Luckily for me, it did not come to that, as two Britons turned up in the nick of time (others came later) who were prepared to go on the air in this unpleasant business. They were Norman Baillie-Stewart and William Joyce.

It is widely believed that it was Mittler's voice that the British journalist Jonah Barrington first described when he wrote of hearing a man who spoke "English of the haw-haw, damit-get-out-of-my-way variety" and whose "strong suit is gentlemanly indignation". Indeed, Mittler's successor, Norman Baillie-Stewart, a former British spy for Nazi Germany, wrote in his post-war autobiography:

The first 'Lord Haw-Haw' of the Berlin Rundfunk was not William Joyce or myself, but handsome, six feet two inches tall, Wolff [sic] Mittler, a man with both snobbish manners and an aristocratic voice. Mittler was a Polish German with curly blond hair, who had received his secondary education in Britain. He was a playboy of the first order. He drove big high-powered sports cars and he was a great attraction for women.

Baillie-Stewart also recalled that Mittler "sounded almost like a caricature of an Englishman with his tone of light mockery and the affectation of his accent. He ended all his announcements with a ridiculous, 'Hearty Cherrios'". As a result, Mittler was most probably the original Lord Haw-Haw, a nickname that later became the sole preserve of William Joyce.

Thereafter, Mittler was to be heard mostly on services for Asia and Africa.

In 1943, Mittler fell under suspicion and fled to Italy, where he was captured by the Gestapo but managed to escape to Switzerland.

== Post-war ==
After the end of World War II and his subsequent return to Germany, he became a radio host for Bayerischer Rundfunk, where he became best known for his simultaneous translation of broadcasts such as John F. Kennedy's speech addressing the Cuban Missile Crisis in 1962 and the first Moon landing live in 1969.

He also conducted interviews with celebrities like Louis Armstrong, Josephine Baker, Gregory Peck, Maria Callas, and Ingrid Bergman, and American president Richard Nixon.

Later in his career, he gave the traffic information for German radio station Bayern 3.

== Television ==
- Sag die Wahrheit (1959) – Host

== Filmography ==
- Helden – Operation Ganymed (1977) – as Annotator
