= Germany Calling =

English language propaganda radio programme

Germany Calling was an English language propaganda radio programme, broadcast by Nazi German radio to audiences in the British Isles and North America during the Second World War. Every broadcast began with the station announcement: "Germany calling! Here are the Reichssender Hamburg, station Bremen". Today, it is best known for its employment of several radio presenters jointly known as Lord Haw-Haw — most notably, William Joyce, who was German radio's most prominent English language speaker and to whom the name gradually came to be exclusively applied.

The regular content included news and jazz music. Jazz was banned from playing on German (domestic) radio stations at the time, as the Nazi party forbade "Negermusik". The announcers were an integral part of the programme, making various announcements and enabling prisoners of war to personally send regards to relatives in their native countries, which made the programme quite popular with listeners of war participating states, especially the United Kingdom and the United States.

Germany Calling was founded on behalf of Reichsminister of Propaganda Joseph Goebbels as a propaganda radio programme aimed mainly at audiences in the United Kingdom and the United States, as well as other parts of the world. Broadcasts were sent (mainly via shortwave) in approximately 30 languages.

Germany Calling ceased broadcasting on 30 April 1945, when Hamburg was overrun by the British Army.

== Studio ==
Contrary to the station announcement, Germany Calling was not recorded in Bremen, but at Norddeich radio station, although at different stages during the war the broadcasts originated variously from Berlin, Luxembourg, and Apen.

== See also ==
- Büro Concordia – WW2-era German radio organisation
- Charlie and his Orchestra
- Reichs-Rundfunk-Gesellschaft
- Axis Sally
- Nordwestdeutscher Rundfunk
