= Apen =

- Municipality
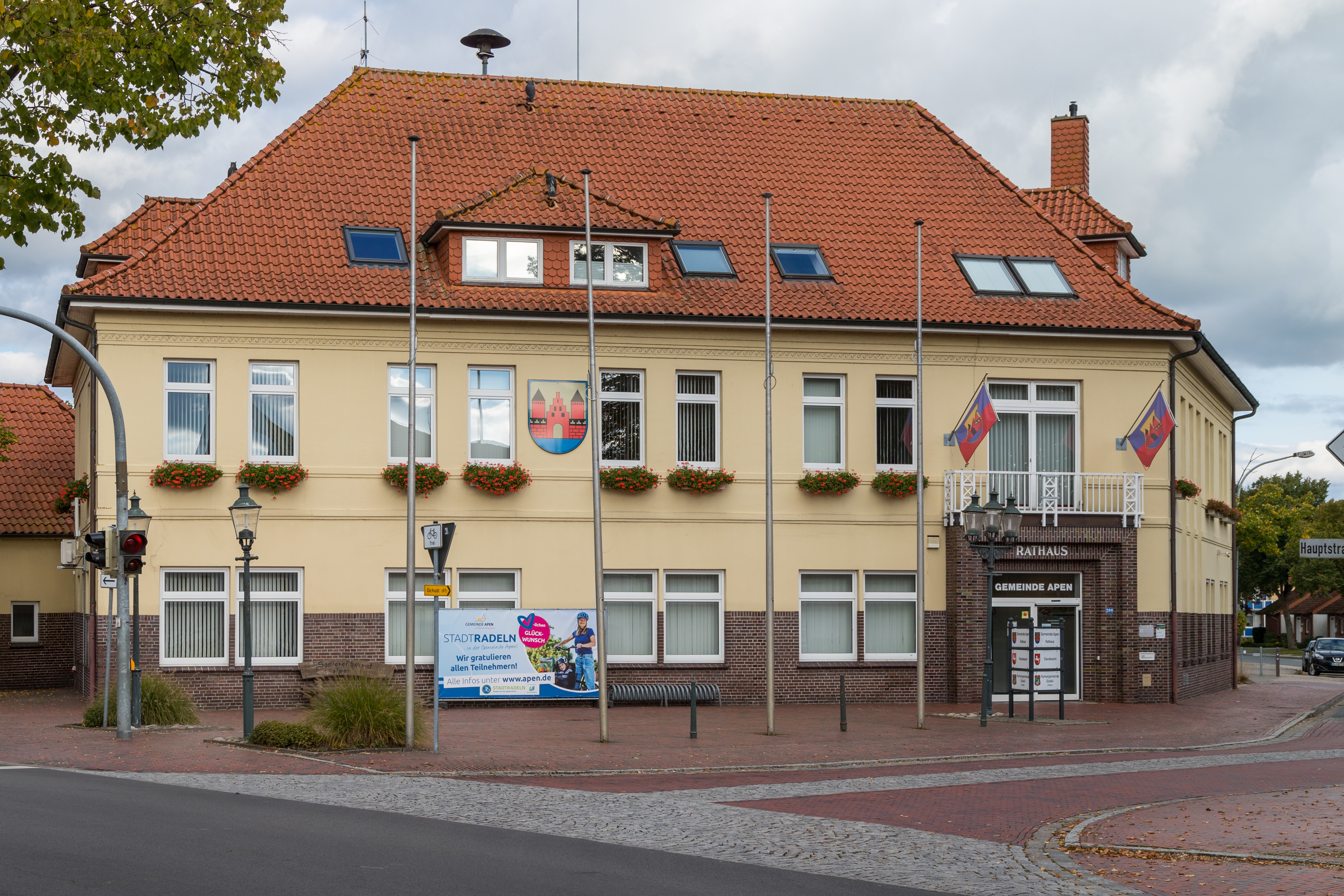
- Town hall in Apen

- Flag Coat of arms

- Location of Apen within Ammerland district
- Interactive map of Apen
- Location within Germany Location within Lower Saxony
- Coordinates: 53°13′17″N 07°48′35″E
- Country: Germany
- State: Lower Saxony
- District: Ammerland
- Subdivisions: 9 districts

Government
  - Mayor (2019–24): Matthias Huber (SPD)

Area
  - Total: 77.02 km^{2} (29.74 sq mi)
- Elevation: 3 m (9.8 ft)

Population (2025-12-31)
  - Total: 12,200
  - Density: 158/km^{2} (410/sq mi)
- Time zone: UTC+01:00 (CET)
  - Summer (DST): UTC+02:00 (CEST)
- Postal codes: 26689
- Dialling codes: 04489
- Vehicle registration: WST
- Website: www.apen.de

Apen (German pronunciation: [ˈaːpn̩]; Low German: Aap) is a municipality in the district of Ammerland, in Lower Saxony, Germany.

== History ==
The first historical mentions of Apen date to around 1230, when the Knights of Apen provided military service to the Count of Oldenburg. At that time, it was an important border town on the water and land route to East Frisia. The St. Nikolai Church was built around this time. The first windmill in the Ammerland region was built in Apen in 1340. Apen was the most important fortress town in the Ammerland region against the East Frisian "foreigners" for centuries.

In 1457, Apen was destroyed in a feud between the East Frisians and Oldenburgers. In the following years, there were repeated fires in Apen, for example in 1465, 1468, and 1473. The fortress of Apen was captured by the Prince Bishop of Münster in 1538. In 1582, Count Johann von Oldenburg established two markets in Apen. The traditional autumn market is still celebrated every year. The fortress of Apen, built around 1515, was expanded into a fort between 1710 and 1730, and was demolished between 1773 and 1780. Only the former moat of the fortress still exists today.

In 1850, the newly founded Augustfehn I-III peat colonies experienced significant industrial development and contributed significantly to the industrialization of the Oldenburg region in the 19th century. The Augustfehn ironworks played a particularly important role in this development.

== Gallery ==
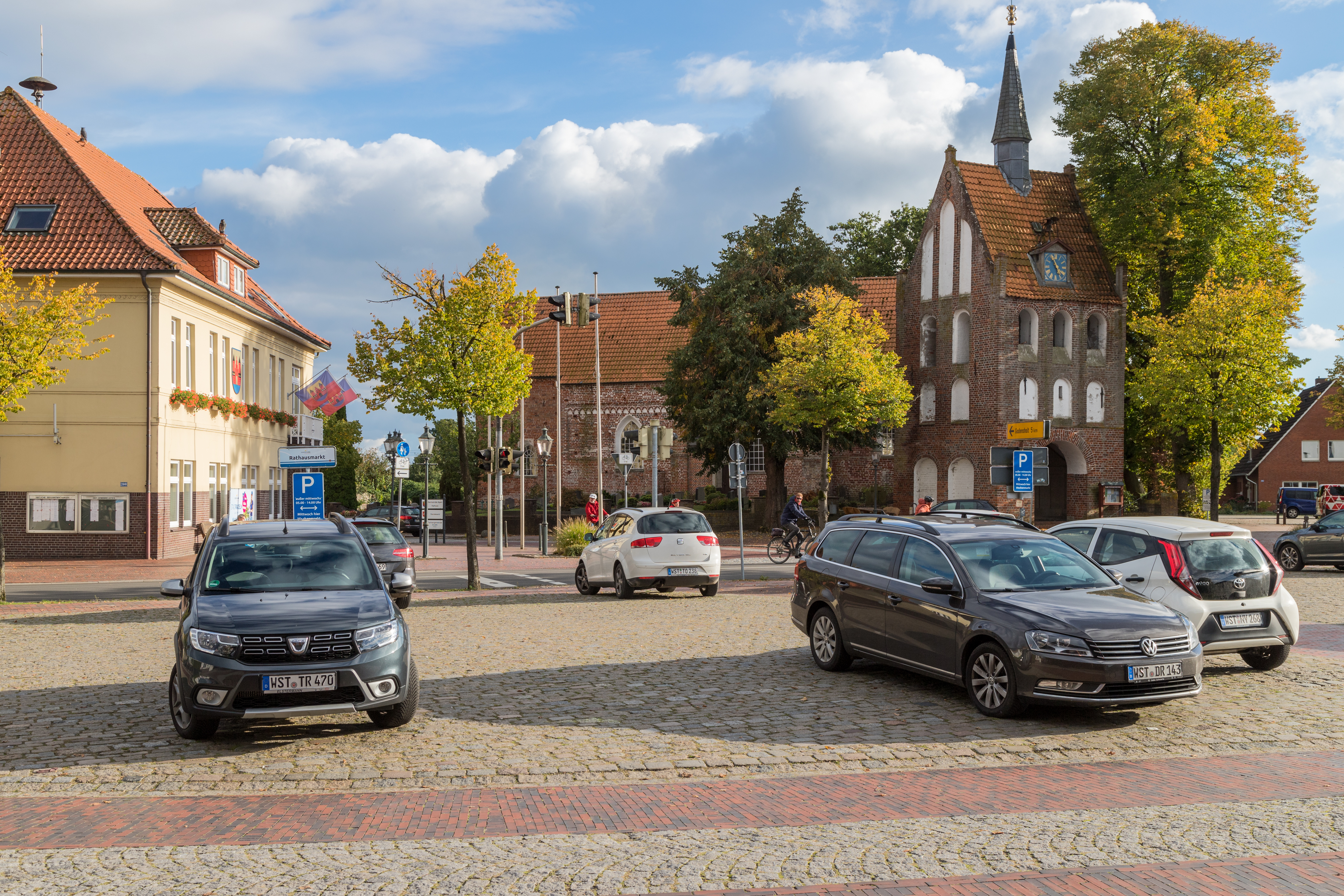
“Rathausmarkt“, town hall and St Nicolas‘ church with bell tower.

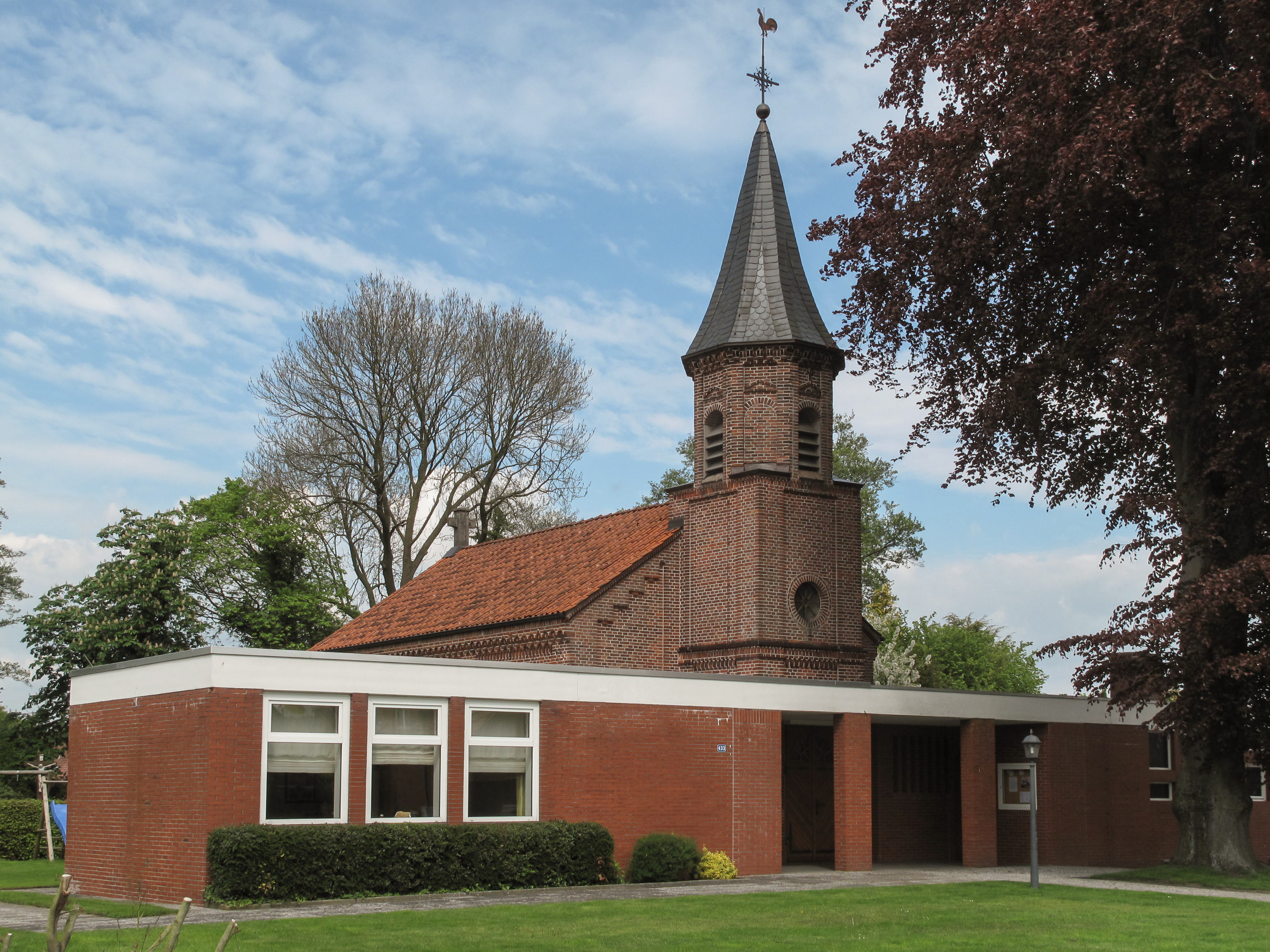
Augustfehn, Church of Saint John the Baptist

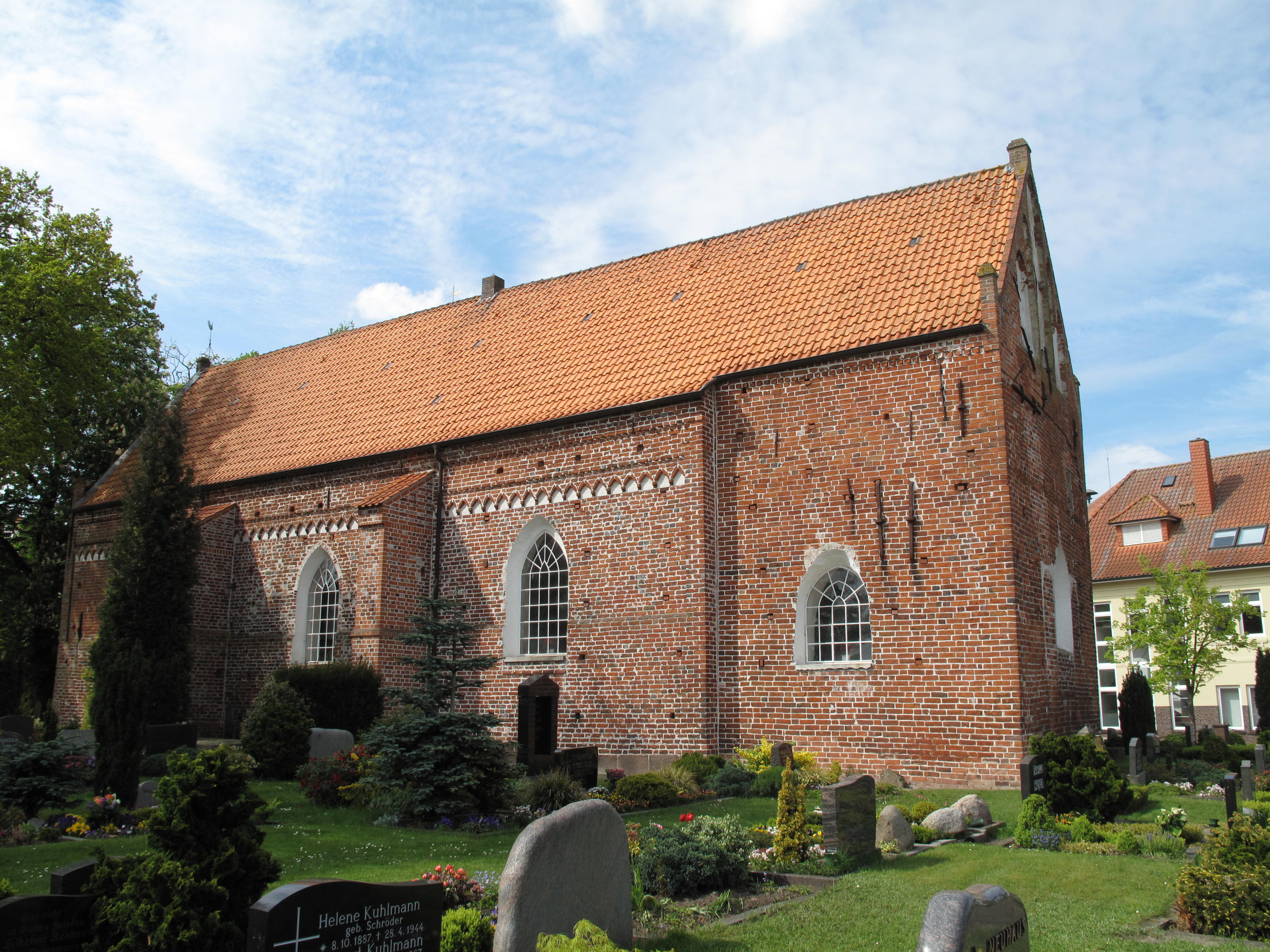
Apen, church
