= Nigel Farndale =

British author and journalist

Nigel Farndale (born 1964) is a British author and journalist, known for his broadsheet interviews and his bestselling novel The Blasphemer.

He has written seven books: four novels, two biographies and a collection of interviews. His latest novel is The Dictator's Muse.

The Blasphemer was shortlisted for the 2010 Costa Book Awards His biography Haw-Haw: The Tragedy of William and Margaret Joyce was published in 2005 and shortlisted for that year's Whitbread Prize and James Tait Black Memorial Prize.

As a journalist he has written for various magazines and newspapers including The Observer, Sunday Times, Financial Times, Daily Telegraph and Spectator. He is currently a senior editor at The Times, a paper for which he also writes columns and interviews.

He has won a British Press Award for his interviews and was the joint subject of a programme about interviewing on Radio 4 when he and Lynn Barber compared notes on Between Ourselves. His interview subjects have included Henry Kissinger, Mick Jagger, Woody Allen, the Dalai Lama, Prince Charles, Elton John, Hillary Clinton, Donald Trump, Paul McCartney, George Best, Jimmy Savile and Stephen Hawking.

Before becoming a writer, Farndale read philosophy for a master’s degree at Durham University. While there he wrote an acerbic letter to Auberon Waugh, who then asked him to write for Literary Review. After spells on Punch magazine and Country Life magazine he moved to the Sunday Telegraph, where he remained for twenty years as a feature writer and columnist.

He is married with three sons and lives on the border between Hampshire and Sussex.

== Publications ==
- The Dictator's Muse. London, 2021. ISBN 0857527177
- The Road Between Us. London, 2013. ISBN 0-385-61913-8
- The Blasphemer. London, 2010. ISBN 0-385-61779-8
- Haw-Haw: The Tragedy of William and Margaret Joyce. London, 2005. ISBN 0-333-98992-9
- Flirtation, Seduction, Betrayal: Interviews with Heroes and Villains. London, 2002. ISBN 1-84119-644-4
- Last Action Hero of the British Empire: Commander John Kerans 1915–1985. London, 2001. ISBN 0-571-20825-8
- A Sympathetic Hanging. London, 2000. ISBN 0-7043-8141-9
- Lives Less Ordinary: Times obituaries of the Eccentric, Unique and Undefinable. (Editor.) London, 2022. ISBN 978-0008537913
- Lives Behind the Music: Times obituaries of rock and pop icons. (Editor.) London, 2024. ISBN 978-0008699642
- Lives Behind the Silver Screen: Times obituaries of iconic film stars. (Editor.) London, 2025. ISBN 978-0008752972
- Sporting Legends: Times obituaries of iconic sport stars. (Editor.) London, 2026. ISBN 978-0008752996
