= Jonah Barrington (journalist) =

British journalist (1904–1986)

Jonah Barrington was the pseudonym of Cyril Carr Dalmaine (20 August 1904 – 21 September 1986) the radio critic of the Daily Express, a British newspaper, during the Second World War. He is especially known as being the person who first used the term "Lord Haw-Haw" to describe a German radio broadcaster:

He speaks English of the haw-haw, damn-it-get-out-of-my-way variety, and his strong suit is gentlemanly indignation.

== Early life and education ==
Dalmaine studied at Eastbourne College and graduated from the Royal College of Music.

== Career ==
Dalmaine was music master at Uppington School and chorus master to the BBC. He composed chamber music, and he transcribed cantatas of Johann Sebastian Bach for piano.

Jonah Barrington was also a record presenter in the pre-1955 days. He was responsible for the "discovery" of the then-deceased Italian tenor, Alessandro Valente. At a time when the great Swedish tenor Jussi Björling's recording of "Nessun dorma" was popular, Barrington played a version by Valente which, he said, was the best he had ever heard. It was instantly popular, and Valente enjoyed a posthumous vogue.
