= Vincent Duggleby =

British radio presenter (1939–2024)

Charles Vincent Anstey Duggleby MBE (23 January 1939 – 7 June 2024) was a British presenter of the long-running personal finance series on BBC Radio 4, Money Box until 2014. An expert on UK paper money, Duggleby published a reference work on the subject which is now in its 10th edition.

== Career ==
Duggleby was a member of the BBC Sport news division from 1963 and 1970, where he also presented Sports Session and Sports Report on BBC Radio. In the 1970s he was a deputy news editor for BBC Radio 4 working on News Desk and The World Tonight and later editor of the BBC’s Financial Unit. In 1974 he commissioned The Financial World Tonight and in 1977, recognising that matters of personal finance were overlooked by the media, launched Money Box. He was a regular presenter on Money Box between 1981 and 2014 and in 1990 launched Money Box Live.

== Personal life ==
Duggleby married Elizabeth Frost in Totnes, south Devon, in 1964. They had two daughters (born in 1966 and 1968). His elder daughter has worked for BBC News. He lived in Torquay. In the 2005 New Year Honours he was appointed a Member of the Order of the British Empire for services to Financial Services. Duggleby died of prostate cancer on 7 June 2024, at the age of 85.

== Publications ==
- English Paper Money, 1975
- Making the Most of Your Money
