= United States Strategic Communication =

Victory in the long war ultimately depends on strategic communication by the United States and its international partners. Effective communication must build and maintain credibility and trust with friends and foes alike, through an emphasis consistency, veracity and transparency both in words and deeds. Such credibility is essential in building trusted networks that counter ideological support for terrorism

— Quadrennial Defense Review Report 2006

Strategic Communication is the "coordinated actions, messages, images, and other forms of signaling or engagement intended to inform, influence, or persuade selected audiences in support of national objectives." There is often debate and discussion concerning what makes strategic communication. Regarding definition, psychological operations, public or civil affairs, information operations and public diplomacy are seemingly the least contested components of U.S. strategic communication. With those components, the most important factor that separates strategic communication from other types of communication is the synchronization and coordination of U.S. efforts. For example, in the National Strategy for Public Diplomacy and Strategic Communication, all strategic communication efforts activities should:

- underscore our commitment to freedom, human rights and the dignity and equality of every human being;
- reach out to those who share our ideals;
- support those who struggle for freedom and democracy; and
- counter those who espouse ideologies of hate and oppression

Strategic communication can be a major tool against adversaries that threaten values supported by the United States. U.S. strategic communication promotes democratization and good governance. It proved vital in winning the Cold War. In the 21st Century, it is critical in countering the radical ideologies of the Islamic Republic of Iran, the Muslim Brotherhood, al- Qaeda and other extremist organizations.

== Official Definitions ==
Academics and professionals alike have yet to find consensus on a universal definition. As explained by Professor Dennis Murphy of the U.S. Army War College, "strategic communication is an emergent concept with several definitions floating about, no doctrinal base and a lexicon that fails completely to convey the desired understanding." The uncertainty among professionals however, has not prevented some official definitions from being released.

2006 Quadrennial Defense Review Executive Roadmap for Strategic Communication

"Focused United States Government processes and efforts to understand and engage key audiences to create, strengthen, or preserve conditions favorable to advance national interests and objectives through the use of coordinated information, themes, plans, programs, and actions synchronized with other elements of national power."

Department of Defense Dictionary of Military and Associate Terms (12 August 2012)

"Focused United States Government efforts to understand and engage key audiences to create, strengthen, or preserve conditions favorable for the advancement of United States Government interests, policies, and objectives through the use of coordinated programs, plans, themes, messages, and products synchronized with the actions of all instrument of national power."

White House 2010 National Framework for Strategic Communication

"Strategic communication(s) refers to (a) the synchronization of words and deeds and how they will be perceived by selected audiences, as well as (b) programs and activities deliberately aimed at communicating and engaging with intended audiences, including those implemented by public affairs, public diplomacy, and information operations professionals."

== Background ==
Strategic communication has been utilized in the United States for most of the 20th century. History, however, indicates that the U.S. primarily engages in strategic communication during times of need, such as World War I, World War II, and the Cold War The first organization that engaged in strategic communication was the Committee on Public Information (1917–1919). The CPI was tasked with not only encouraging domestic loyalty, but to build understanding and support of U.S. foreign policy abroad. This committee was the first of many U.S. organizations dedicated to strategic communication, i.e. promoting U.S. interests overseas. In 1942, President Franklin D. Roosevelt created the United States Office of War Information to promote patriotism, and warn against enemy subversion through photos, posters, press releases, radio programs and even movies.

Seal of The United States Information Agency

The United States Information Agency (1953–1999) was the premier strategic communication organization for the latter half of the 20th century. The USIA mission was:

- To explain and advocate U.S. policies in terms that are credible and meaningful in foreign cultures;
- To provide information about the official policies of the United States, and about the people, values, and institutions which influence those policies;
- To bring the benefits of international engagement to American citizens and institutions by helping them build strong long-term relationships with their counterparts overseas;
- To advise the President and U.S. government policy-makers on the ways in which foreign attitudes will have a direct bearing on the effectiveness of U.S. policies.

== Current Application ==
"Tools of persuasion and inspiration were indispensable to the outcome of the defining ideological struggle of the 20th century. I believe that they are just as indispensable in the 21st century—and maybe more so."—Former Defense Secretary Robert Gates

=== The Department of Defense ===
The United States Department of Defense actively engages in strategic communication abroad. In the DOD, activities related to strategic communication are information operations, psychological operations, public affairs and civil affairs, defense support to public diplomacy (DSPD), military diplomacy, and Visual Information (VI). Unified Combatant Command (COCOMs) are major regional commands headed by a four-star flag or general officer. Strategic communication within these commands is up to the Commanders. For example, Pacific Command has a Communication Integration Working Group, and European Command has a Strategic Communication Working Group. ." COCOMs also provide support to the Department of State's public diplomacy efforts pending a direct request from an embassy within the appropriate geographic area. These activities include hospital-ship visits, community-service activities or Military Information Support Team (MIST) visits.

Civil Military Support Elements (CMSE) are also used to provide support to the DOS along with Military Information Support Teams. They emphasize U.S. commitments to the region, as well as moderate political messages to combat radical ideologies. Sometimes CMSE and MIST will provide textbooks and other educational materials for schools to create support for the U.S.

Military Information Support Operations (MISO) and Civil Affairs System division are responsible for developing, acquiring, fielding and sustaining the SOF Information Environment. This includes managing three programs, MISO-Broadcast, Next Generation Loudspeaker System, and MISO-Print.

MISO-Broadcast provides tactical, mobile and deployable radio and television systems.

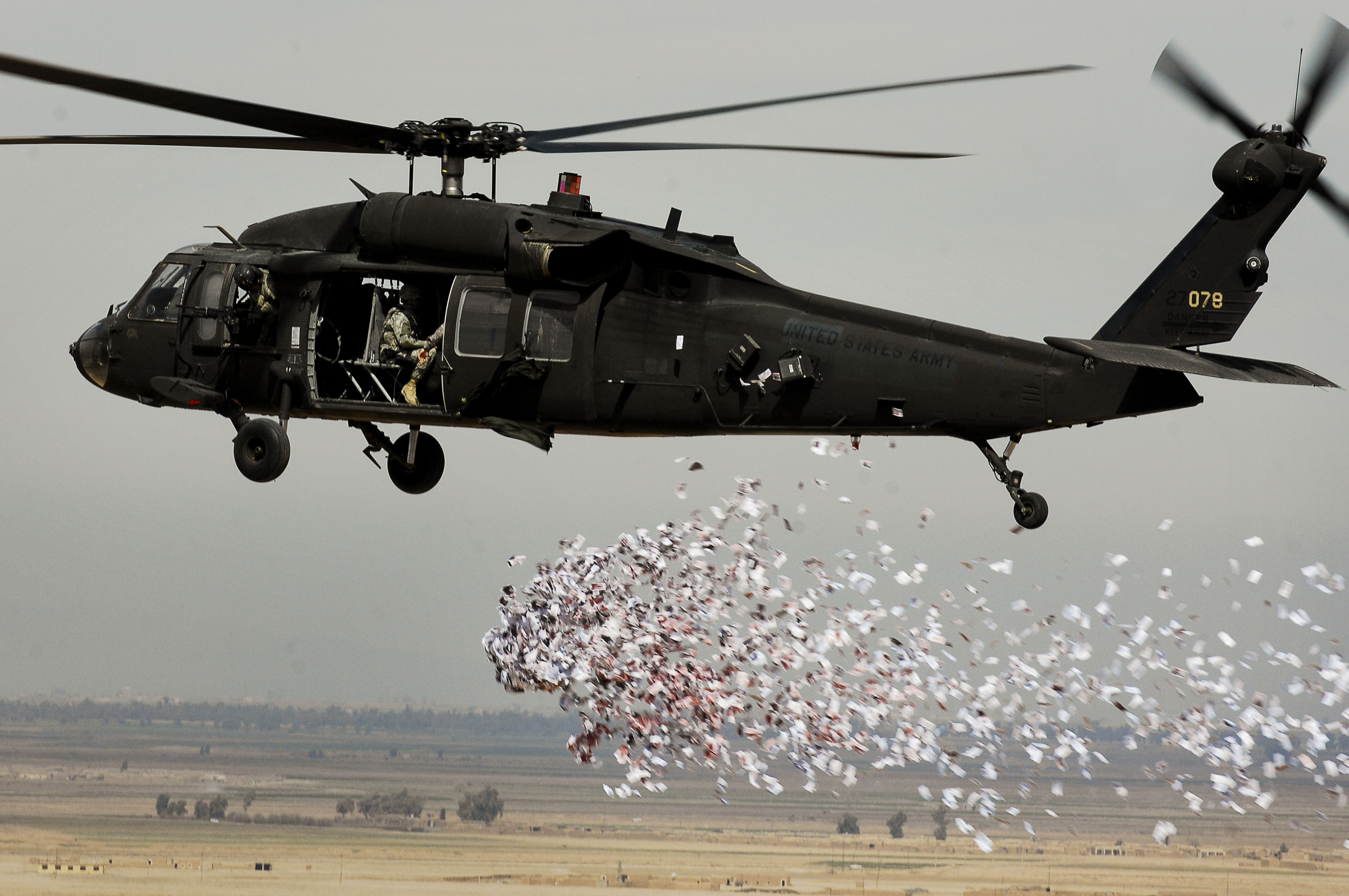
UH-60 PSYOP Leaflet Drop, near Hawijah, Iraq 06 March 2008

Next Generation Loudspeaker System develops, integrates, acquires and fields transportable audio broadcast systems to MISO forces so they can reach targeted audiences in any potential environment. Specific systems include:

- Manpack: a loudspeaker optimized for dismounted operations and flexibility of employment to pinpoint targets
- Ground Vehicle/Watercraft: a high-decibel loudspeaker system that can be attached to a wide variety of military and commercial ground vehicles and watercraft- optimized for effective employment in support of ground, riverine, littoral, coastal, and open-water operations
- Unmanned Ground Vehicle: a loudspeaker system optimized for broadcasting in a higher threat environment in support of ground operations
- Unmanned Aircraft System: a loudspeaker system optimized for broadcasting to dispersed audiences in higher threat environments to broaden the areas of loudspeaker accessibility and increase mobility
- Scatterable Loudspeaker: hand-emplaced or air-delivered loudspeakers for disseminating delayed or on-cue response messages that may be long- or short- duration and integrated with other media programs such as greeting cards, games, etc
- Sonic Projection: a long-range beam of sound that does not have an obvious source to the intended target or listener.

MISO-Print acquires, fields and sustains MISO for creating, editing and producing printed material.

- MIS OP- Heavy, used to produce high-volume, high-quality print requirements of Geographic Combatant Commanders (developed at Fort Bragg)
- MIS OP-Medium (Fixed), an intermediate print facility outside continental United States that supports Geographic Combatant Commands
- MIS OP- Medium, a large, deployable print system with a moderate volume print capability. This is the primary print asset in the theatre level of operations.
- MIS OP- Light, a rapidly deployable capability used for immediate printing support at the theater and tactical levels. This provides the initial print capability until MISOP-Medium can arrive.

=== The Department of State ===
Public Diplomacy is utilized by the United States Department of State to "support the achievement of U.S. foreign policy goals and objectives, advance national interests, and enhance national security by informing and influencing foreign publics and by expanding and strengthening the relationship between the people and government of the United States and citizens of the rest of the world." These efforts are managed by the Undersecretary for Public Diplomacy and Public Affairs. Tara Sonenshine is the current Undersecretary. Her responsibilities include "leading the U.S. governments overall public diplomacy effort, increasing the impact of educational and cultural exchange, and developing and utilizing new technologies to improve the efficiency of public diplomacy programs." The primary bureaus within the Department of State that engage in public diplomacy abroad are.":

- Bureau of Educational and Cultural Affairs (ECA): The ECA's mission is to foster mutual understanding between the people of the United States and the people of other countries by means of educational and cultural exchanges.
- Bureau of International Information Programs(IIP): The IIP administers programs that present information on foreign policy, society, and values to foreign audiences through print and electronic resources in several languages to improve international receptiveness to the United States, its people, and national interests.
- Bureau of Public Affairs (PA): The PA has a Rapid Response Unit (RRU) that addresses high-profile issues by providing daily approved strategic-level statements by senior U.S. officials. Military leaders use this to develop military-oriented strategic communication products.:

Within the Department of State is the interagency organization, Global Strategic Engagement Center (GSEC). GSEC includes personnel from the Department of State, Department of Defense, the National Counterterrorism Center, the intelligence community and other U.S. government entities involved with strategic communication. This organization serves as the day-to-day interagency coordination, research, analysis and planning on U.S. strategic communication issues. The GSEC operationalizes decisions made by the Interagency Policy Committee (IPC) for Global Engagement. The Chair of the IPC is the Director of Strategic Communication, National Security Council (NSC).

The Department of State is the lead organization in United States Cyber-Diplomacy. This new venture combines the traditional tools of public diplomacy with "innovations in communication and information technology." Some United States Cyber-Diplomacy programs include Dipnote, Opinion Space, Virtual Student Foreign Service and Virtual Presence Post.

=== Additional Organizations ===
Broadcasting Board of Governors(BBG) was created with the dissolution of the United States Information Agency. It assumed responsibility for all nonmilitary, international broadcasting sponsored by the U.S. including the Voice of America, Radio Free Europe/Radio Liberty, Radio Free Asia, Radio and Tv Martí and the Middle East Broadcasting Networks. When these programs were under USIA, they proved strategically important in reaching audiences with valuable information behind the Iron Curtain.

The United States Agency for International Development(USAID) provides nonmilitary foreign assistance to countries around the world. USAID supports disaster recovery and promotes long-term and equitable economic growth. This is done by supporting efforts that support agriculture and food security, economic growth and trade, education, global health and other efforts.

== See also ==
- Information Operations
- Propaganda
- Psychological Warfare
- Radio Propaganda
- United States Information Agency
- United States Cyber-Diplomacy
