= Radio propaganda =

Propaganda delivered through radio broadcast

Radio propaganda is propaganda aimed at influencing attitudes towards a certain cause or position, delivered through radio broadcast. The power of radio propaganda came from its revolutionary nature. The radio, like later technological advances in the media, allowed information to be transmitted quickly and uniformly to vast populations. Internationally, the radio was an early and powerful recruiting tool for propaganda campaigns.

Before television, radio was by far the most effective way to prevent or promote social change. In many areas, it still is. Radio propaganda can be broadcast over great distances to a large audience at a relatively low cost. Through radio, a propagandist can bring his voice and all the persuasive power of his emotions to millions of people. A similar approach is used in every war employing radio propaganda: aside from convincing those on the home front of the necessity of war, a different kind of propaganda must be directed towards the enemy. Radio became a powerful propaganda tool because it ignored national borders and made enemy lines more accessible. One of the most common ways hosts got the civilian and enemy populations to listen to their broadcasts was by dropping leaflets from hot air balloons or airplanes. Most programs were broadcast on selected stations at certain times of the day; the dropped leaflets explained exactly when and where the broadcasts could be heard.

== World War II ==
The use of radio as a wartime propaganda tool was made famous during World War II by broadcasting organizations such as Voice of America and by shows such as Tokyo Rose, Axis Sally, and Lord Haw Haw.

=== Nazi Germany ===
The radio was an important tool of the Nazi propaganda efforts and it has been argued that it was the Nazis who pioneered the use of what was still a relatively new technology. A few months after the break out of World War II, German propagandists were transmitting no less than eleven hours a day of programs, offering most of them in English as well. In the first year of Nazi propaganda programming, broadcasters attempted to destroy pro-British feeling rather than arouse pro-German sentiment. These propagandists targeted certain groups, including capitalists, Jews, and selected newspapers/politicians. By the summer of 1940, the Nazis had abandoned all attempts to win American sympathy and the tone of German radio broadcasts towards the United States had become critical.

German propaganda minister, Joseph Goebbels, claimed the radio was the "eighth great power" and he, along with the Nazi party, recognized the power of the radio in the propaganda machine of Nazi Germany. Recognizing the importance of radio in disseminating the Nazi message, Goebbels approved a mandate whereby millions of cheap radio sets were subsidized by the government and distributed to German citizens. It was Goebbels' job to propagate the anti-Bolshevik statements of Hitler and aim them directly at neighboring countries with German-speaking minorities. In Goebbels' "Radio as the Eighth Great Power" speech, he proclaimed:

“It would not have been possible for us to take power or to use it in the ways we have without the radio...It is no exaggeration to say that the German revolution, at least in the form it took, would have been impossible without the airplane and the radio…[Radio] reached the entire nation, regardless of class, standing, or religion. That was primarily the result of the tight centralization, the strong reporting, and the up-to-date nature of the German radio.”

As well as domestic broadcasts, the Nazi regime used the radio to deliver its message to both occupied territories and enemy states. One of the main targets was the United Kingdom to which William Joyce broadcast regularly, gaining him the nickname "Lord Haw-Haw" in the process. Broadcasts were also made to the United States, notably through Robert Henry Best and 'Axis Sally', Mildred Gillars.

=== United Kingdom ===
British propaganda during the First World War set a new benchmark that inspired the fascist and socialist regimes during the Second World War and the Cold War; Marshal Paul von Hindenburg stated, "This English propaganda was a new weapon, or rather a weapon which had never been employed on such a scale and so ruthlessly in the past." It was clear that large numbers of civilians could be mobilized for a massive war effort through persuasive techniques derived from the emerging disciplines of behavioral psychology and social sciences.

An example of effective radio propaganda by the United States for the United Kingdom is the news reports of Edward R. Murrow. When the United Kingdom was at the time the only remaining nation opposing Germany in the autumn of 1940, Murrow covered the Battle of Britain and particularly the nightly bombing raids on London. His reports described the falling of the bombs, their impact, and the destruction they brought. As he described his approach to a London newspaper in 1941, "The official news is perhaps less important than the more intimate stories of life, work, and sacrifice."

Murrow's objective was to focus on reaching the common man through his broadcasts, intimating to the world that the United Kingdom was fighting a "people’s war," not a war for its colonies, as the American isolationists charged. He wanted Americans to know that the UK was standing tall, united in its cause and protecting Western liberties and European civilization. He wanted Americans to see the UK as their natural ally and hurry to extend a helping hand. Many say he had far greater influence than the American ambassador to London; "He was an ambassador, in a double role, representing Britain in America as well as America in Britain.... He was a diplomat without a portfolio, a spokesman for a cause."

=== United States ===
Historians believe the moment when American radio made its debut as the preeminent means of foreign news was the Munich Crisis in September 1938. Early that month, Hitler began implementing his plans to dominate Europe by demanding self-determination for Germans living in a region of Czechoslovakia known as the Sudetenland. He left few doubts that he meant to annex the Sudetenland as part of an enlarged German Reich. High-level negotiations ensued, during which Britain's Prime Minister, Neville Chamberlain, journeyed to Germany three times in less than three weeks in a desperate attempt to save the peace. Fearful that a European war would once again entangle them, Americans became glued to their radios for daily and sometimes hourly updates and interpretations of the latest developments of the crisis. Within a couple of days, American listeners were bombarded with news programs, special news bulletins, and expert commentary on the crisis.

America's first real venture into international broadcasting was in 1940 after Nazi victories in Europe, when the Roosevelt administration was becoming increasingly concerned about the effects of Nazi propaganda, both domestically and internationally. In August 1940, President Roosevelt issued an Executive Order establishing the Office of Coordination of Commercial and Cultural Relations to promote the use of government/private radio, and the Office of the Coordinator of Information. By 1942, the most famous radio program airing overseas became known as the "Voice of America." Even before the Japanese attack on Pearl Harbor, the U.S. government's Office of the Coordinator of Information began providing war news and commentary to commercial American shortwave radio stations for use on a voluntary basis.

A popular government wartime radio show, performed by President Franklin D. Roosevelt, was known as "fireside chats". Two of the most famous programs on the radio show were entitled "On National Security" and "On the Declaration of War with Japan". "The Arsenal of Democracy" was a slogan coined by President Roosevelt during his national security radio broadcast delivered on 29 December 1940. Roosevelt promised to help the UK fight Nazi Germany by providing them with military supplies in a program known as Lend-Lease, while the United States stayed out of the actual fighting. This announcement was made a year before the attacks on Pearl Harbor, at a time when Germany had occupied much of Europe and threatened the UK. The day after the attack on Pearl Harbor, Roosevelt delivered his famous Infamy Speech to the United States, which was broadcast to the American people. The President called for a formal declaration of war on the Empire of Japan. The Infamy Speech was brief, running to just a little over seven minutes, and Roosevelt made a point of emphasizing that the United States and her interests were in grave danger. In so doing, he sought to end the isolationist stance the United States had previously been advocating concerning involvement in the war. The overall tone of the speech was one of determined realism. Roosevelt made no attempt to glaze over the extensive damage that had been caused to the American armed forces, noting the number of American lives lost in the attack. However, he emphasized his confidence in the strength of the America to face the challenge posed by Japan.

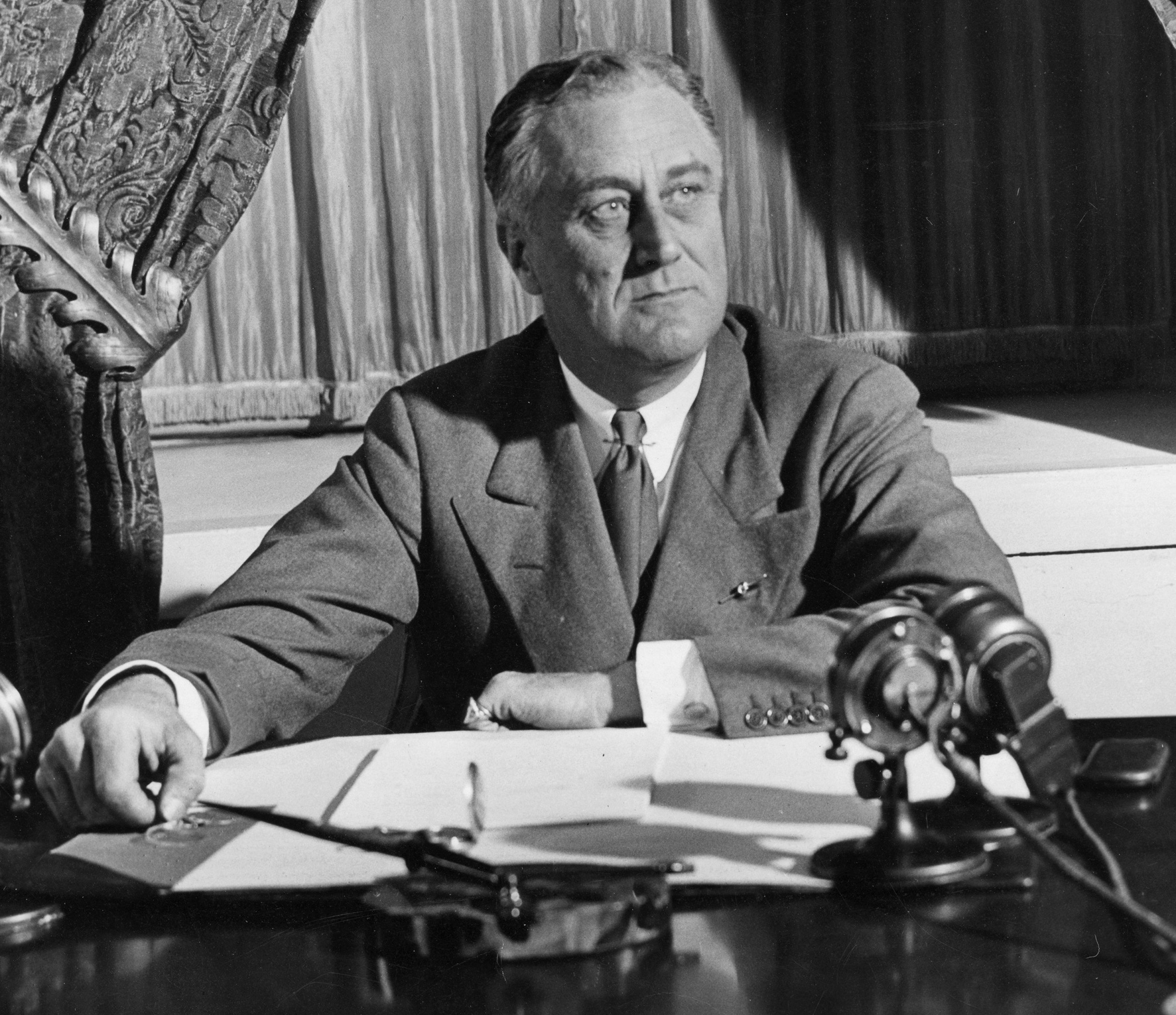
FDR "fireside" chats.

"Yesterday, December 7th, 1941 – a date which will live in infamy – the United States of America was suddenly and deliberately attacked by naval and air forces of the Empire of Japan. It will be recorded that the distance of Hawaii from Japan makes it obvious that the attack was deliberately planned many days or even weeks ago. During the intervening time, the Japanese Government has deliberately sought to deceive the United States by false statements and expressions of hope for continued peace.”

"As Commander-in-Chief of the Army and Navy I have directed that all measures be taken for our defense, that always will our whole nation remember the character of the onslaught against us. No matter how long it may take us to overcome this premeditated invasion, the American people, in their righteous might, will win through to absolute victory.”

"Hostilities exist. There is no blinking at the fact that our people, our territory and our interests are in grave danger. With confidence in our armed forces, with the un-bounding determination of our people, we will gain the inevitable triumph. So help us God.”

President Franklin D. Roosevelt – 8 December 1941

With this declaration of war, radio became part of the propaganda campaign. Throughout the war, the attack on Pearl Harbor was frequently used in American propaganda. Direct wartime programming began shortly after the United States entry into the war. The first live broadcast to Germany, called Stimmen aus Amerika ("Voices from America") took place on 1 February 1942. It was introduced by "The Battle Hymn of the Republic" and included the pledge: "Today, and every day from now on, we will be with you from America to talk about the war.... The news may be good or bad for us – We will always tell you the truth."

The Armed Forces Radio Service created a number of radio shows for American GIs stationed overseas. The most popular of these "mosquito networks" was GI Jive. In Agra, India, Virginia C. Claudon Allen broadcast nightly to counter Tokyo Rose.

=== Famous radio shows ===
During World War II, American GIs in both the Pacific and European theaters of war heard anonymous voices on the radio playing carefully selected American music and extolling the virtues of Japanese and Nazi causes. The DJs continuously encouraged GIs to stop fighting and constantly made false claims of American defeats and Japanese or Nazi victories. They frequently referred to specific American units and individuals by name, and in rare cases mentioned the names of loved ones back home. GIs dubbed the voice from Japan "Tokyo Rose"; two popular voices from Germany were "Axis Sally" and "Lord Haw-Haw".

"Tokyo Rose": After being stranded in Japan while visiting her sick aunt after the United States refused to let her reenter the country after the attack on Pearl Harbor, Iva Toguri wound up at Radio Tokyo as a typist, preparing English-language scripts drafted by Japanese authorities for broadcast to the Allied troops in the Pacific. At Radio Tokyo, Toguri met captured Australian Major Charles Cousens and his associates, American Captain Wallace Ince and Filipino Lieutenant Normando Reyes. A supporter of the Allies in the war, she was delighted to meet soldiers who had been fighting for her side. Put off by her overt friendliness and pro-Americanism, the POWs initially suspected her of being a Kempeitai spy, but over the next few months they eventually came to trust her. When Radio Tokyo directed Cousens to include a woman DJ in his Zero Hour program, he asked for Toguri by name. Since their capture and conscription into Radio Tokyo, the Allied POWs had waged a covert campaign to sabotage the Japanese propaganda effort through the use of on-air innuendos, satire, and sarcastic, rushed or muffled readings. Now they had to bring a fourth party into the conspiracy, and the only person they could trust to support their efforts was Toguri. She was dubbed with the name "Tokyo Rose" and listeners came to know her by that name.

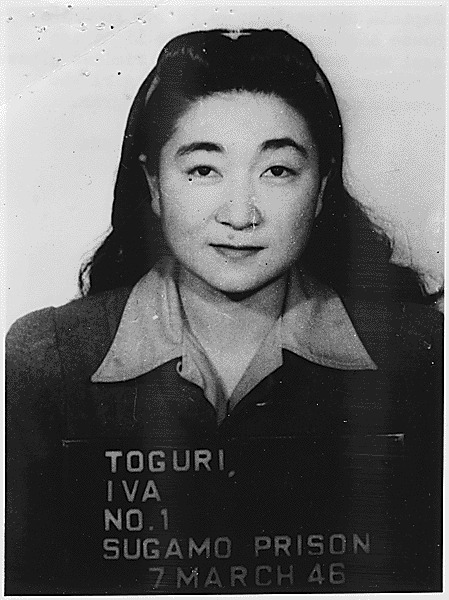
Iva Toguri "Tokyo Rose".

After the war, the Army Counter Intelligence Corps, the Federal Bureau of Investigation, and the press continued to refer to Toguri by that name as she was taken into custody and brought to trial. Those defending Toguri stated that she was clearly "forced" to broadcast for the Japanese and was always a loyal American, shown by her many attempts to return home, which were continuously rejected. They also pointed to the lack of "tangible" evidence; American investigators never discovered any Japanese documents with the name "Tokyo Rose" because "Tokyo Rose" was a name coined by American GIs. However, under the United States Constitution, treason is the act of providing "aid and comfort" to an enemy. It does not say that force, loneliness, trickery, coercion, or fright are mitigating factors in favor of traitors. On 6 October 1949, Toguri was sentenced to 10 years in prison and fined $10,000. She served less than half that time and was pardoned by President Gerald Ford.

"Axis Sally" was the pseudonym of Mildred Gillars, an American broadcaster employed by the Third Reich in Nazi Germany to proliferate propaganda during World War II. By 1941, the U.S. State Department advised American nationals to return home, but Gillars chose to stay in Germany after her fiancé, a German citizen named Paul Karlson, refused to marry her if she returned to the United States. Shortly afterwards, Karlson was sent to the Eastern Front, where he died in action. In 1940 she obtained work as an announcer with the Reichs-Rundfunk-Gesellschaft (RRG), German State Radio. On 7 December 1941, Gillars was working in the studio when the Japanese attack on Pearl Harbor was announced. She broke down in front of her colleagues and announced her allegiance to the East. However, since she decided to stay in Germany, Gillar was faced with the prospect of joblessness or prison, so she produced a written oath of allegiance to Germany and returned to work, her duties being limited to announcing records and participating in chat shows. She soon acquired several names amongst her GI listeners, including Berlin Bitch, Berlin Babe, Olga, and Sally, but the one that became most common was "Axis Sally."

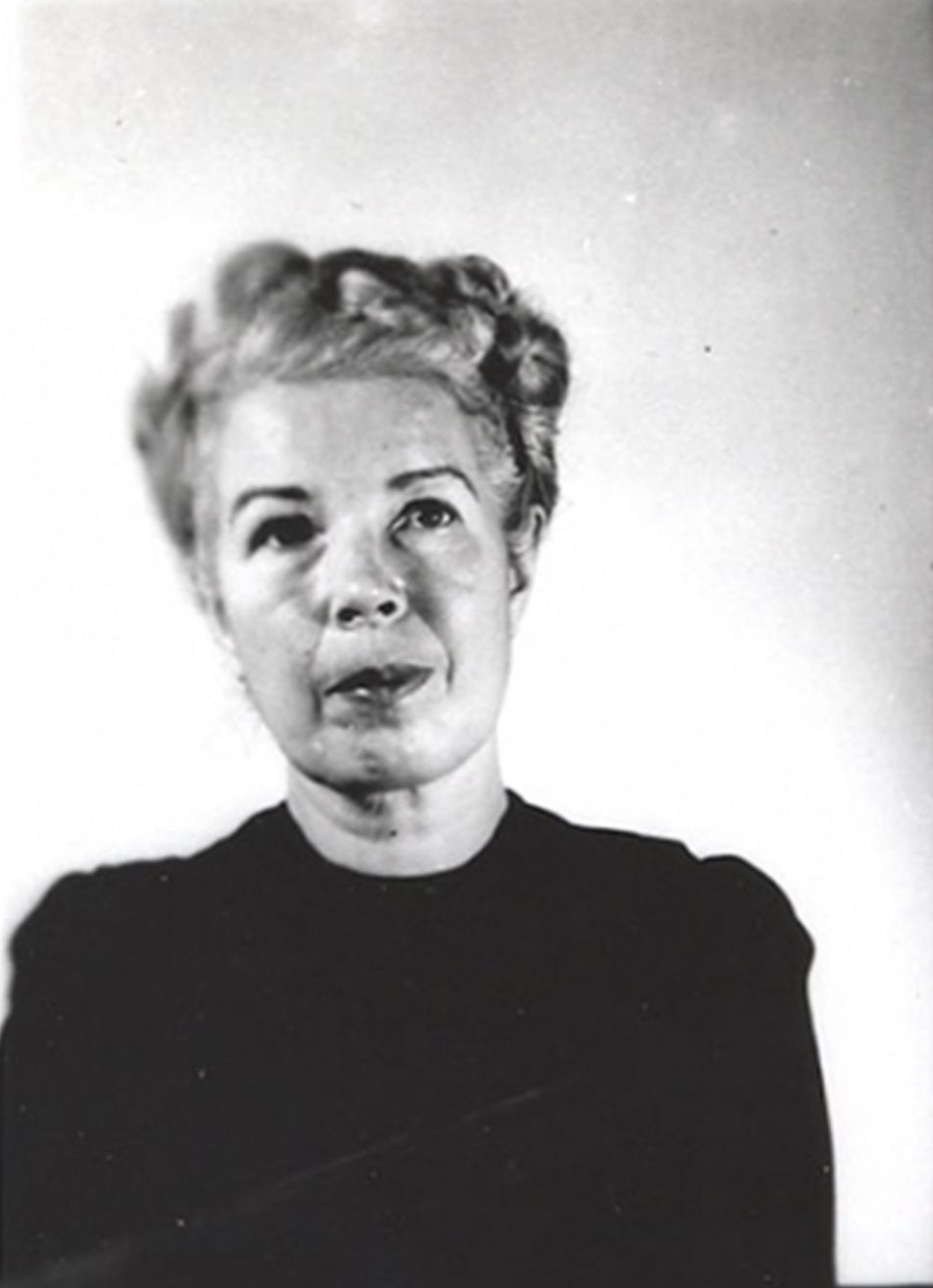
Mildred Gillars "Axis Sally".

Her most successful show was known as Home Sweet Home. Home Sweet Home attempted to exploit the fears of American soldiers about the home front. The broadcasts were designed to make the soldiers cast doubt on their mission, their leaders, and their prospects after the war. Another show was known as Midge at the Mike, broadcast to late fall 1943. Gillar played American songs interspersed with defeatist propaganda and anti-Semitic rhetoric, as well as G.I.’s Letter box and Medical Reports in 1944, in which Gillars used information on wounded and captured U.S. airmen to cause fear and worry in their families. She was convicted of treason by the United States in 1949 following her capture in post-war Berlin. Her arrest came about after the U.S. attorney general specially dispatched prosecutor Victor C. Woerheide to Berlin to find and arrest Gillars. He only had one solid lead: Raymond Kurtz, a B-17 pilot shot down by the Germans, recalled that a woman who had visited his prison camp seeking interviews was the broadcaster. Gillars was indicted on 10 September 1948, and charged with 10 counts of treason, but only eight were presented at her trial, which began on 25 January 1949. The prosecution relied on the large number of her programs recorded by the Federal Communications Commission to demonstrate her active participation in propaganda activities against the United States. It was also shown that she had made an oath of allegiance to Adolf Hitler. She was sentenced to 10 to 30 years in prison and a $10,000 fine.

"Lord Haw-Haw" was a pseudonym for William Joyce, German radio's most prominent English-language speaker. He hosted a propaganda show on a radio program called Germany Calling, broadcast by Nazi German radio to audiences in the UK on the station Reichssender Hamburg. The program started on 18 September 1939 and continued until 30 April 1945, when Hamburg was overrun by the British Army. Through his broadcasts, the Reich Ministry of Public Enlightenment and Propaganda attempted to discourage and demoralize British, Canadian, Australian, and American troops and the British population within radio range to suppress the effectiveness of the Allied war effort through propaganda and to motivate the Allies to agree to peace terms leaving the Nazi regime intact and in power. The Nazi broadcasts prominently reported on the shooting down of Allied aircraft and the sinking of Allied ships, presenting discouraging reports of high losses and casualties among Allied forces. Although listening to his broadcasts was highly discouraged, many Britons did indeed tune into them. In 1940, at the height of his influence, Joyce had an estimated 6 million regular and 18 million occasional listeners in the United Kingdom.

At the end of the war, Joyce was captured by British forces at Flensburg, near the German border with Denmark. Spotting a dishevelled figure resting from gathering firewood, intelligence soldiers engaged him in conversation, asked if he was Joyce, and when he reached in his pocket for his false passport, the soldiers, believing he was armed, shot him in the buttocks, leaving four wounds. Joyce was charged on the basis that, even though he had misstated his nationality to gain possession of a British passport, until it expired this entitled him to British diplomatic protection in Germany, and therefore he owed allegiance to the King of England at the time he commenced working for the Germans. Joyce was convicted and sentenced to death on 19 September 1945.

== Cold War ==
By 1946, it became clear to the United States that the Soviet Union did not share the American vision of postwar collaboration for peace in Europe. Soviet authorities began to install Communist regimes in liberated territories of Eastern Europe, a direct violation of the provisions in the Teheran and Yalta Conferences. The radio became crucial in the propaganda war between the two blocs and was the main concern of both participants’ information agencies as the "war of ideas" began. In 1948, the Soviet Union organized the Communist Information Bureau (Cominform), which was formed to unite the Communist states in forthcoming struggle against "Anglo-American Imperialism."

One of the earliest responses in Europe was known as Radio in the American Sector (RIAS). RIAS was established in 1946 to serve the American sector in West Berlin. The station's importance was magnified during the 1948 Berlin blockade, when it carried the message of Allied determination to resist Soviet intimidation. In East Germany, broadcasts included news, commentary, and cultural programs that were unavailable in the controlled media of the German Democratic Republic. The management of RIAS developed many of the techniques later used to develop Radio Free Europe/Radio Liberty. The RIAS broadcasts concentrated on the idea of democracy and the importance of the breakdown of the international communications barriers erected by the Communists. The programming was generally geared towards "special groups" within the East German population, including youth, women, farmers, etc. The broadcast became known as the "bridge" from West to East Germany over the Berlin Wall.

Aside from RIAS, Voice of America (VOA) began broadcasting in 1947 in the Soviet Union for the first time as a part of U.S. foreign policy to fight the propaganda of the Soviet Union and other countries. Initially, there was only one hour per day of news and other features broadcast on the pretext of countering "more harmful instances of Soviet propaganda directed against American leaders and policies" on the part of the internal Soviet Russian-language media. The Soviet Union responded by initiating aggressive, electronic jamming of Voice of America broadcasts on 24 April 1949. This led critics to question the broadcasts' actual impact. However, after the collapse of the Warsaw Pact and the Soviet Union, interviews with participants in anti-Soviet movements verified the effectiveness of VOA broadcasts in transmitting information to socialist societies.

While many acknowledged the importance of propaganda as an instrument of foreign policy, it was primarily the Cold War that institutionalized propaganda as a permanent instrument of U.S. foreign policy. The Soviets suddenly increased the tempo of the war, by taking over Czechoslovakia and attempting to take complete control of Berlin. Realizing there was no further hope of considering the Soviet Union as an ally, the North Atlantic Treaty Organization was formed in April 1949, establishing the policy of containment of Communism as the organization's priority. The escalation of the Cold War intensified America's interest in broadcasting and information policy. The world was entering into a new era of foreign relations; therefore, the United States National Security Council produced a study in 1949 that concluded that there was a need for the United States to have a major information program to counter Soviet aggression. The council issued document 10/2, approved by President Truman in June 1948, authorizing a comprehensive program of clandestine warfare, including black propaganda, psychological warfare, subversion, assistance to underground resistance movements, paramilitary operations, and economic warfare. The most famous form of anti-Soviet propaganda was the development of Radio Free Europe (RFE) and Radio Liberty (RL), which broadcast to Eastern Europe. The stations' purpose, above all, was fighting a political mission against Communism and Sovietism, against the representatives of the terrorist regimes. Its job was to mask Communist plans and expose all of those who were propagandist of Communist ideology. While other countries established international broadcasting entities, RFE/RL's purpose was to change the form of government in foreign nations by airing news not about the country from which the broadcasts originated, but about the countries that were the targets of the broadcasts.

President Harry Truman announced in 1950 that the United States would launch an information program known as the "Campaign of Truth." The name was strategically picked to avoid any connotation of propaganda. The goals of the campaign included:

1) Establish a “healthy international community” with confidence in American leadership.
2) Present America fairly and counter “all the misrepresentations.”
3) Discourage further Soviet encroachment by showing that American is desirous of peace but is prepared for war.
4) Help “to roll back Soviet influence” by all means short of force, making captive people feel that they can identify with the West, weakening the morale of the Soviet military personnel, and encouraging non-Communist forces.

In late 1950, RFE/RL began to assemble a full-fledged foreign broadcast staff, becoming more than a "mouthpiece for exiles." Teams of journalists were hired for each language service and an elaborate system of intelligence gathering provided up-to-date broadcast material. Most of this material came from a network of well-connected émigrés and interviews with travelers and defectors. The Communist regimes devoted considerable resources to countering Western broadcasts. They organized radio jamming on a massive scale, spending more on jamming than the West did on broadcasting. They placed spies in Western radio stations in an attempt to disrupt information sharing and organize counterpropaganda, while also attempting to gain access to top level officials who could provide them with information controlled by Western media outlets or intelligence services. These countermeasures by foreign regimes significantly drained domestic resources, and failed to neutralize Western broadcasts.

During these years, the practice of propaganda became inextricably tied to the practices of psychological warfare. During World War II, psychological warfare was largely seen as an accessory to military operations, but during the Cold War psychological warfare was used to influence public opinion and advance foreign policy interests. Psychological warfare became, in essence, a synonym for the Cold War. It reflected the belief that the Cold War was an ideological, psychological, and cultural contest for hearts and minds that would be won or lost on the plain of public opinion. When President John F. Kennedy took office, his administration had a greater interest in the U.S. information effort than any other president up until that time. With Soviet premier Nikita Khrushchev’s address to the Soviet Central Committee in 1961, U.S. leaders believed the Soviet Union would be ready to seek a more limited form of conflict, emphasizing their winning of hearts and minds. The United States saw this as a good sign to use psychological resources to their advantage. However, these components of propaganda were put on hold with the Bay of Pigs scandal, the Cuban Missile Crisis, and the abrupt end of the Kennedy Administration.

== Vietnam ==
The first Vietnamese-language radio transmission was made on 2 September 1945, when Ho Chi Minh read out the Declaration of Independence. Prior to 1945, Vietnamese people were banned from owning radio receivers, and broadcasting was under control of the French colonial government, which established the first radio station in Vietnam, Radio Saigon, in the late 1920s. Vietnam's national radio station, now called the Voice of Vietnam, started broadcasting from Hanoi the week after declaration of the Democratic Republic of Vietnam, stating, "This is the Voice of Vietnam, broadcasting from Hanoi, the capital of the Democratic Republic of Vietnam." During the Vietnam War, Radio Hanoi operated as a propaganda tool of North Vietnam. Following reunification, all radio stations were combined into the Voice of Vietnam, which became the national radio station in 1978.

"Hanoi Hannah" or Trịnh Thị Ngọ, was a Vietnamese radio personality best known for her work during the Vietnam War, when she made English-language broadcasts for North Vietnam directed at U.S. troops. During the Vietnam War in the 1960s and 1970s, Ngo became famous among U.S. soldiers for her propaganda broadcasts on Radio Hanoi. She made three broadcasts a day, reading the list of the newly killed or imprisoned Americans, attempting to persuade U.S. GIs that the U.S. involvement in the Vietnam War was unjust and immoral and playing popular U.S. anti-war songs in an attempt to incite feelings of nostalgia and homesickness amongst U.S. troops. Although she used the alias Thu Huong, the GIs usually called her "Hanoi Hannah" or "the Dragon Lady". Few were believed to have been influenced by her propaganda work and the soldiers often mocked her tactics, but they were also impressed by her military intelligence, especially when she mentioned the location of their own unit or listed specific U.S. casualties. After the war, she returned to live in Ho Chi Minh City with her husband where her voice was better known in the U.S. than in her own country.

== Iraq and Afghanistan ==
The United States took the lead in broadcasting psychological operations due to its superior technology and its ability to use aircraft to broadcast AM, FM and shortwave radio from directly above target audiences. America had dropped battery or crank-powered radios on third-world nations like Haiti so that the populace could hear U.S. broadcasts. In the more recent struggles in Iraq and Afghanistan, the United States distributed various battery and solar-powered satellite radios so that its story could be heard. The U.S. also dropped leaflets to inform Afghans about the attacks of 11 September and the Taliban, and to infiltrate Iraq with information on anti-Saddam radio programs that would be broadcast.

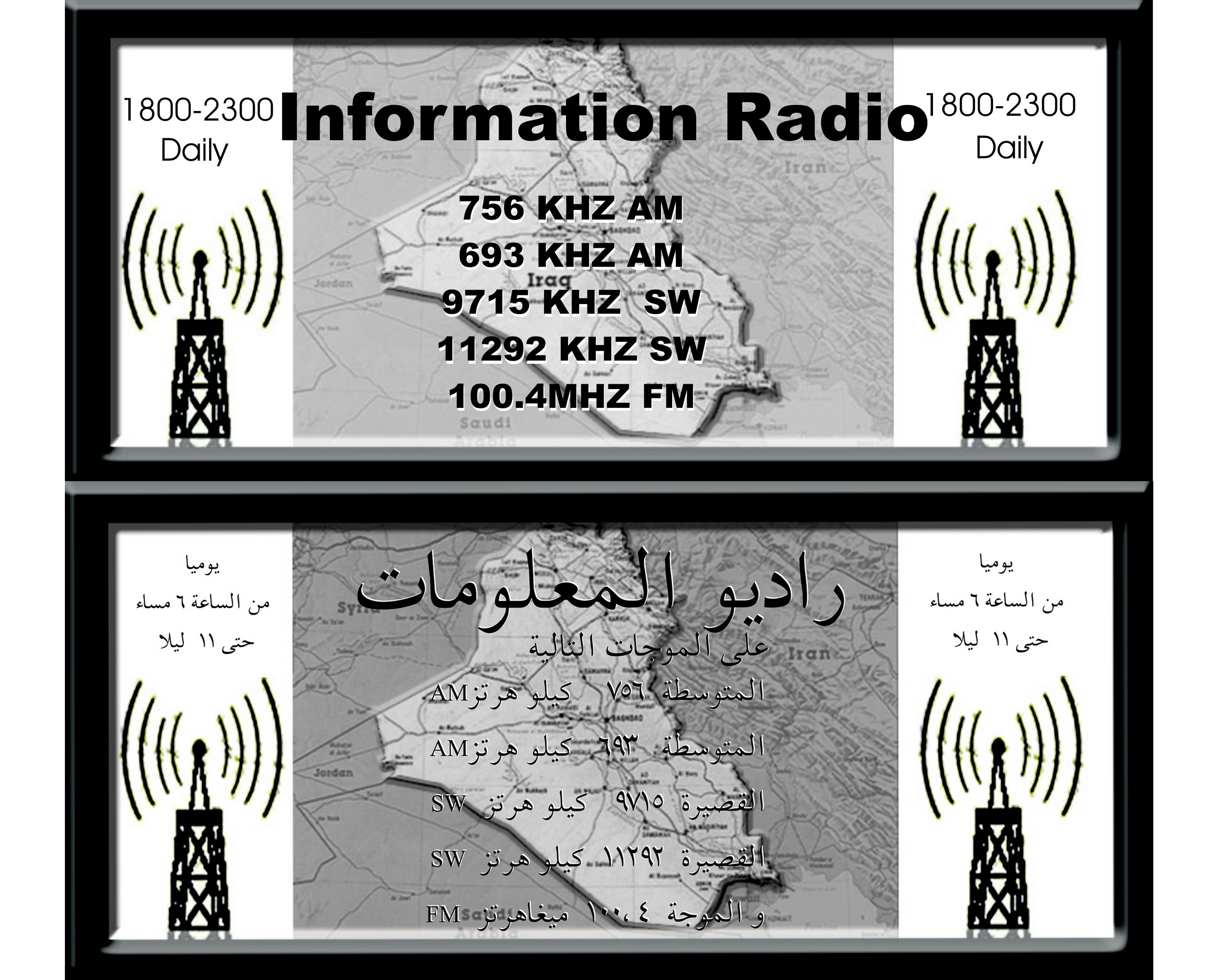
Leaflets dropped by aircraft encouraging Iraqis to listen for news broadcasts on special radio channels.

In the 2001 invasion of Afghanistan, psychological operations (PSYOP) tactics were employed to demoralize the Taliban and to win the sympathies of the Afghan population. At least six EC-130E Commando Solo aircraft were used to jam local radio transmissions and transmit replacement propaganda messages even before the United States invaded Afghanistan. The primary PSYOP objectives were used to counter adversarial propaganda, to discourage interference with humanitarian affairs activities, to support objectives against state and non-state supporters and sponsors of terrorism, and to disrupt support for and relationships among terrorist organizations. In Afghanistan, the U.S. military has long conducted propaganda campaigns to try to sway public opinion against insurgents. Today (2013), the U.S. is teaching Afghan army units how to counter Taliban propaganda, especially with local radio broadcasts. The idea is to counter the Taliban-sponsored stations, so called "Mullah Radios," that operate mainly in the tribal areas along the Pakistani border and broadcast propaganda that helps turn public opinion against foreign troops and the pro-Western Afghan government. Radio is key to reaching the majority of Afghans; with only limited access to television, newspapers, and the Internet, most depend on radio programs for information.

During the Iraq War, the U.S. implemented "black propaganda" by creating false radio personalities who disseminated pro-American information, but were supposedly supporters of Saddam Hussein. Radio Tikrit was a radio station in Iraq that broadcast programs that reflected strong support for the Iraqi leader Saddam Hussein and his government. The station's name is also the name of the Iraqi town where Saddam and other members of his government were born. However, the tone of Radio Tikrit's programs began to change dramatically; one show reportedly described Iraqis as being so poor that they had to sell their windows and doors. Another broadcast reported to have encouraged Iraqi soldiers to refuse the "orders of the tyrant" and to "be brave before it is too late," suggesting that the United States may have infiltrated the station. The U.S. was also successful with the Voice of America efforts once the censorship of the Iraqi media was lifted with the removal of Saddam from power.

== Voice of America ==
Official logo for Voice of America.

Voice of America, The Voice, or VOA is the official external broadcast institution of the United States federal government, sponsoring programming for broadcast on the radio, television, and the Internet outside of the U.S. in 43 languages. Currently, VOA produces about 1,500 hours of news and feature programming each week to global audience in order, "to promote freedom and democracy and to enhance understanding through multimedia communication of accurate, objective, and balanced news, information and other programming about America and the world to audiences overseas." Under § 501 of the Smith–Mundt Act of 1948, the Voice of America was forbidden to broadcast directly to American citizens until July 2013 when it was repealed in the Smith-Mundt Modernization Act provision of the National Defense Authorization Act for 2013. The intent of the legislation was to protect the American public from propaganda actions by its own government.

On 12 July 1976, the principles were signed into law by President Gerald Ford:

"The long-range interests of the United States are served by communicating directly with the peoples of the world by radio. To be effective, the Voice of America must win the attention and respect of listeners. These principles will therefore govern Voice of America (VOA) broadcasts:
1. VOA will serve as a consistently reliable and authoritative source of news. VOA news will be accurate, objective, and comprehensive.
2. VOA will represent America, not any single segment of American society, and will therefore present a balanced and comprehensive projection of significant American thought and institutions.
3. VOA will present the policies of the United States clearly and effectively, and will also present responsible discussions and opinion on these policies.”

Today, the VOA operates shortwave radio transmitters and antenna farms at one site in the United States close to Greenville, North Carolina. The 44 languages that Voice of America currently broadcasts in include (TV broadcasts are marked with an asterisk):

- Afan Oromo
- Albanian*
- Amharic
- Arabic*
- Armenian*
- Azerbaijani*
- Bengali*
- Bosnian*
- Burmese
- Cantonese*
- Creole
- Croatian*
- Dari*
- English* (also Special English)
- French*
- Georgian
- Greek*
- Hausa
- Hindi
- Indonesian*
- Khmer
- Kinyarwanda
- Kirundi
- Korean
- Kurdish
- Lao
- Macedonian*
- Mandarin*
- Northern Ndebele
- Pashto*
- Portuguese
- Russian*
- Serbian*
- Shona
- Somali
- Spanish*
- Swahili
- Thai
- Tibetan*
- Tigrigna
- Turkish*
- Ukrainian*
- Urdu*
- Uzbek*
- Persian*
- Vietnamese

From 1942 to 1945, VOA was part of the Office of War Information, from 1945 to 1953, a function of the State Department, and in 1953 it was placed under the U.S. Information Agency. When the USIA was abolished in 1999, the VOA was placed under the Broadcasting Board of Governors (BBG), where the control remains today. The BBG was established as a buffer to protect VOA and other U.S.-sponsored, non-military, international broadcasters from political interference.

In 1994, Voice of America became the first broadcast-news organization to offer continuously updated programs on the Internet in English and 44 other languages, using more than 20,000 servers across 71 countries. Since many listeners in Africa and other areas still receive much of their information via radio and have only limited access to computers, VOA continues to maintain regular shortwave-radio broadcasts.

== Radio Free Europe/Radio Liberty ==
Radio Free Europe/Radio Liberty is a broadcaster funded by the United States Congress that provides news, information, and analysis to countries in Eastern Europe, Central Asia, and the Middle East "where the free flow of information is either banned by government authorities or not fully developed". RFE/RL is supervised by the Broadcasting Board of Governors, alongside Voice of America.

Founded as an anti-Communist propaganda source during the Cold War, RFE/RL was headquartered in Munich, Germany, from 1949 to 1995. In 1995, the headquarters were moved to Prague in the Czech Republic, where operations have been significantly reduced since the end of the Cold War. In addition to the headquarters, the service maintains 20 local bureaus in countries throughout their broadcast region, including a corporate office in Washington, D.C. RFE/RL broadcasts in 28 languages to 21 countries including Russia, Iran, Afghanistan, Pakistan, and Iraq.

RFE/RL was developed out of a belief that the Cold War would eventually be fought by political rather than military means. American policymakers such as George Kennan and John Foster Dulles acknowledged that the Cold War was essentially a "war of ideas". The United States, acting through the Central Intelligence Agency, funded a long list of projects to counter the Communist appeal in Europe and the developing world. The missions of RFE/RL were separate from Voice of America in the sense that VOA was meant to be the voice of America, reflecting American foreign policy and disseminating world news from an official American viewpoint, whereas RFE/RL has the mission of captivating people and stimulating non-cooperation in Communist countries.

== See also ==
- Nazi Propaganda
- Voice of America
- Radio Free Europe/Radio Liberty
- Black propaganda
- Political warfare
- Psychological warfare
- United States Strategic Communication
- Atrocity propaganda
