= Mail Call (radio program) =

American radio program

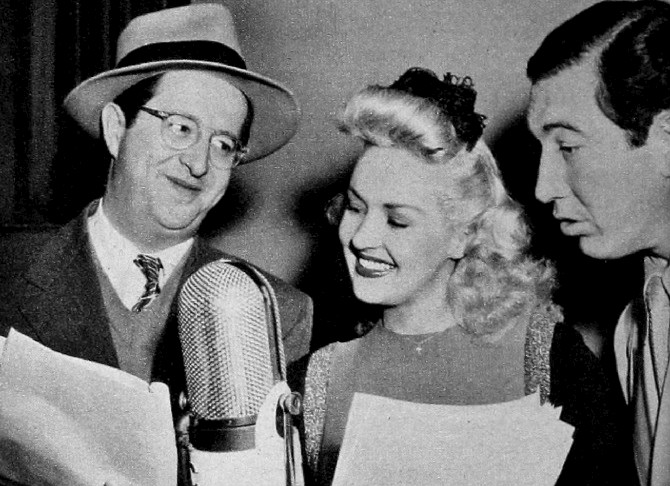
- Phil Silvers, Betty Grable and Rags Ragland on Mail Call in 1943
- Genre: Variety
- Country of origin: United States
- Language: English
- Syndicates: CBS
- Original release: August 11, 1942 – 1945

Mail Call was an American radio program that entertained American soldiers from 1942 until 1945, during World War II. Lt. Col. Thomas A.H. Lewis (commander of the Armed Forces Radio Service) wrote in 1944, "The initial production of the Armed Forces Radio Service was 'Mail Call,' a morale-building half hour which brought famed performers to the microphone to sing and gag in the best American manner." The program featured popular entertainers of that day, such as Bob Hope, Bing Crosby, Judy Garland, and Dinah Shore, performing musical numbers and comedy skits to boost the morale of soldiers stationed far from their homes. Lewis added, "To a fellow who has spent months guarding an outpost in the South Seas, Iceland or Africa a cheery greeting from a favorite comedian, a song hit direct from Broadway, or the beating rhythm of a hot band, mean a tie with the home to which he hopes soon to return.

== California headquarters ==
Mail Call and other AFRS programs were produced in Los Angeles, Calif., with the organization's headquarters at 6011 Santa Monica Boulevard, The location provided access to top-flight entertainers, staff and facilities. The Encyclopedia of Radio noted: "Los Angeles was selected as the headquarters because of its proximity to the entertainment industry, which quickly gave its overwhelming support. The mission of the new AFRS was to provide American servicemen 'a touch of home' through the broadcast of American news and entertainment." Among the behind-the-scenes people was Meredith Willson (perhaps best known for writing "The Music Man"), who was the first musical director for AFRS.

Many of the behind-the-scenes military people involved in Mail Call and other AFRS programs had jobs similar to those they had had in civilian life. Erik Barnouw wrote:

Because its [AFRS's] commandant, Colonel Thomas H.A. Lewis, had been vice president of Young & Rubicam -- always known as "Y&R" -- the most Hollywood-oriented advertising agency, much top talent was drawn from the agency's productions. The uniformed staff, representing both army and navy, was supplemented by civilians. Some of the uniformed men had been drafted, then re-routed back to Hollywood and the "Y&Rmy

During at least one interval, however, production shifted to the East Coast. The Oct. 21, 1944, issue of The Billboard magazine carried a story headlined, "AFRS To Cut 4 Major E.T.s In East 12 Weeks." It reported:

The four top armed forces radio service shows, Command Performance, Mail Call, Jubilee and G.I. Journal will be cut in New York from October 15 until November 13, a total of more than 12 shows. Idea is to give G.I.'s a chance to hear Eastern legit and night club talent.

== Format revision ==
Patrick Morley's book, This Is the American Forces Network: The Anglo-American Battle of the Air Waves in World War II, related a significant shift in format for Mail Call: "The early issues included a feature, 'What's Going on at Home,' followed-up by a brief sound-clip from a current film using the stars featured in the picture. But this made for unexciting listening, and before long the format was changed so that Mail Call more closely resembled Command Performance." The revised format was that of a variety show, mixing music, comedy and exchanges between entertainers.

Each installment of Mail Call began in an easily recognizable way, as quoted by Morley:

Mail Call from the United States of America. Stand by Americans. Here's Mail Call, one big package of words and music and laughter delivered to you by the stars from whom you want to hear in answer to the requests you send to the Armed Forces Radio Service in Los Angeles, USA.

Like the entertainers who appeared on the program, the announcers who spoke that introduction were familiar to the troops because of their popularity in radio. They included Ken Carpenter, Harry von Zell and Don Wilson.

== European exposure and audience ==
Although production of Mail Call and other AFRS programs was done in the United States, radio facilities in other countries were needed to broadcast the programs. A story in the April 1944 issue of Radio News noted:

American soldiers in the European Theatre of Operations have their own private radio network now -- thanks to the British Broadcasting Corporation and the U.S. Army Signal Corps. ... All this, of course, would not have been possible without the generous and friendly cooperation of the BBC, which waived its monopolistic rights on radio broadcasting in Great Britain and offered many of its own facilities so that the Yanks could enjoy American programs on what the soldiers call the "G.I. Network."

The people of Great Britain not only provided broadcasting facilities through the BBC, but also listened to Mail Call and other programs broadcast by AFRS. An article in the July 9, 1945, issue of Broadcasting magazine headlined "U.S. Programs Are Popular in Britain" cited a survey in Great Britain that "showed that 20,000,000 adults in Britain had recently listened to one or more of the seven programs produced in the United States and rebroadcast in Britain." Two AFRS programs, Command Performance and Mail Call, were among those seven, with listening percentages of 27.5 and 22.9, respectively. A bonus for the artists who donated their time and effort to performing on Mail Call and other AFRS programs was increased international exposure. Author Donna Halper wrote: "Many of the popular female vocalists and comedians, along with some of the most popular men, were now internationally famous" as a result of exposure on Command Performance and Mail Call. She added, "Suddenly, American music was exposed to an entirely new audience, since it was not just the soldiers who listened to AFRS."

== End of the broadcast ==
After World War II ended, the need for shows like Mail Call diminished, resulting in changes in AFRS programming. Broadcasting magazine reported that the end for Mail Call and eight "other service radio shows requiring outside talent" came in 1950 when the "AFRS budget was ... cut by $153,000 by the Secretary of Defense." Other shows discontinued in the move were as follows Command Performance, Redd Harper Hollywood Roundup, GI Jive, Jill's Juke Box, Chiquita, Personal Album, Lucky Grab Bag and Bob Carleton Show.

== See also ==
- List of U.S. radio programs
