= Command Performance (radio series) =

US Armed Forces Radio show from 1942–49

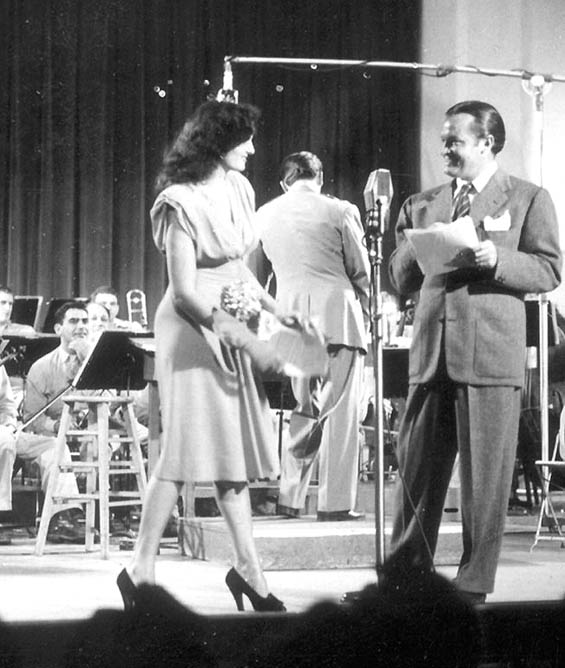
Command Performance broadcast with Jane Russell, Bob Hope and, in background, Major Meredith Willson conducting the AFRS band (c. 1944)

Command Performance was a radio program which originally aired between 1942 and 1949. The program was broadcast on the Armed Forces Radio Network (AFRS) and transmitted by shortwave to overseas troops — but with few exceptions, it was not broadcast over domestic U.S. radio stations.

== Background ==
Most episodes of the program were produced before an audience in the Vine Street Playhouse in Hollywood, California, and recorded via electrical transcription. In 1949, the weekly listening audience was estimated to be 95.5 million soldiers and civilians.

Troops sent in requests for a particular performer or program to appear, and they also suggested unusual ideas for music, sketches, or sounds from home on the program, such as: "Ann Miller tap dancing in military boots"; "a sigh from Carole Landis" or Lucille Ball; "foghorns on San Francisco Bay"; "Errol Flynn taking a shower"; "a slot machine delivering the jackpot" and "Bing Crosby mixing a bourbon and soda for Bob Hope". Top performers of the day were Bing Crosby, Jack Benny, Frank Sinatra, Bob Hope, Fred Allen, Ginger Rogers, Judy Garland, Lena Horne and The Andrews Sisters.

The first Command Performance was broadcast on March 1, 1942, almost three months after the bombing of Pearl Harbor. It was produced under the aegis of the Office of War Information and its success paved the way for the creation of the Armed Forces Radio Service in May 1942. Time magazine described Command Performance as being "the best wartime program in America". However, very few listeners in the United States ever heard it. The only program accessible to the general audience was the Christmas Eve Command Performance of 1942. Variety magazine commented on this saying:

The War Department on Christmas Eve gave domestic listeners their first taste of a series that had been going out to the Armed Forces on short-wave for 43 consecutive weeks. The purpose of the special occasion as Elmer Davis, Office of War Information chief, expressed it in a foreword to the show, was to forge a link between the servicemen abroad and the folks on the Home Front. A recorded version of the show was short-waved, all over the world, the next day… Hope emceed, tossed off a monologue and cross-fired with Crosby. A special treat in the vocal department was the version of "Basin Street Blues" that came out of the tonsil partnership of Bing Crosby and The Charioteers."

Variety also observed that “sometimes the language on these shows is just a little more robust than is passed by standard broadcasting stations. Jack Benny, as we recall, last Sunday night encouraged our fighting men to ‘give ’em hell.'”

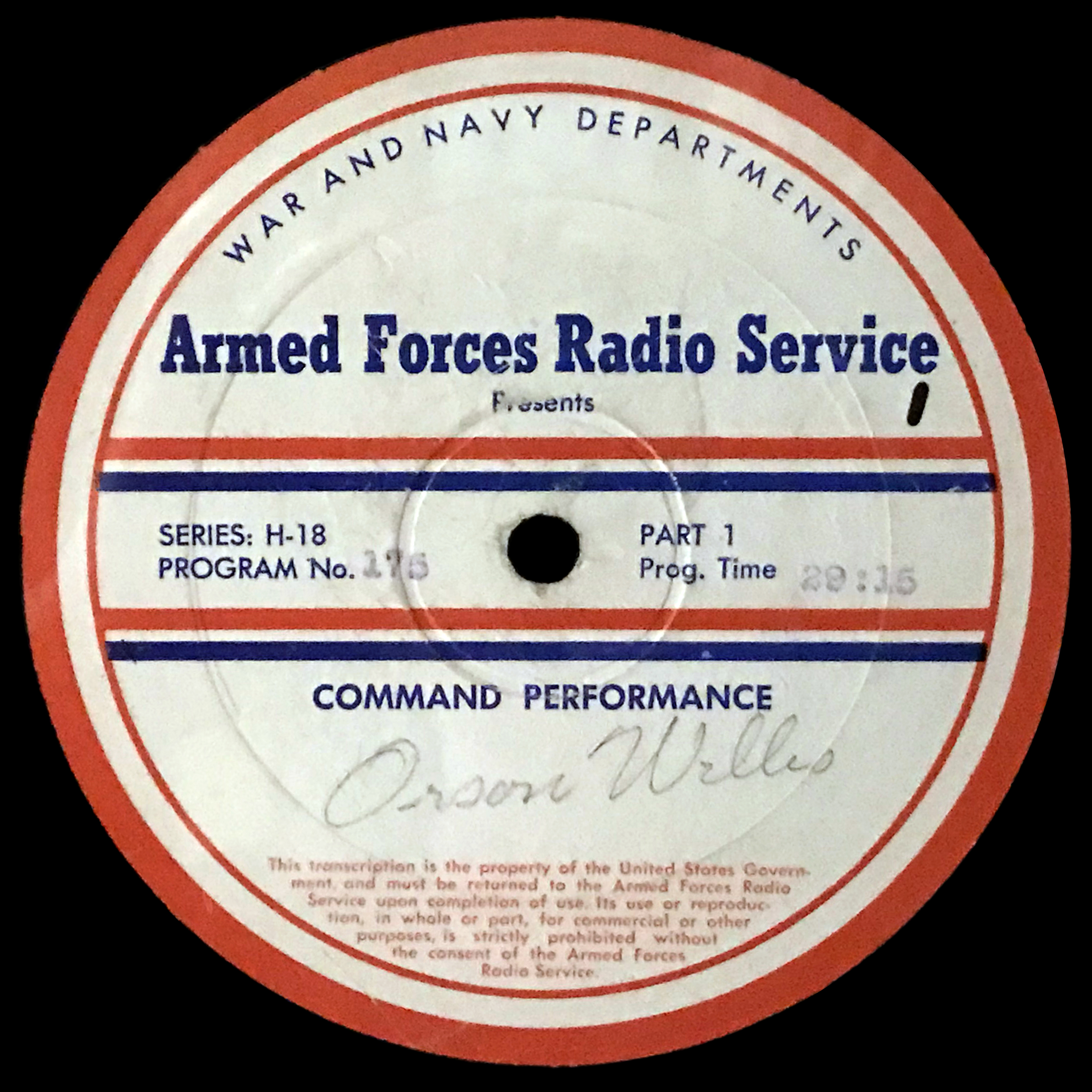
Transcription disc label for broadcast number 175 (May 17, 1945) of Command Performance, featuring Orson Welles

At the outset, the AFRS was shortwaving the shows but the reception was often distorted or spoiled by fading and static. Also, many servicemen had no access to a shortwave receiver. These problems were resolved when the Armed Forces Radio Service sought permission from the four major radio networks to record favorite programs on 16" transcription discs. As many as 70 of these programs were recorded and produced each week, especially for the armed forces, together with Command Performance, Mail Call, G.I. Journal, and various other series. At the peak of the war around 21,000 transcriptions were being shipped to troops in Europe, Asia, and the South Pacific and over 800 radio stations, operated by and for servicemen, were set up to cover all theaters of war.

Performers volunteered their talents for the program. An article in a 1943 issue of Tune In magazine estimated if "Presented by a commercial sponsor, Command Performance would have a weekly talent cost of $50,000." In addition, performing and production unions waived their rules for the war effort on the condition that the shows were only broadcast to service personnel.

The final episode of Command Performance—the 415th in the series—was produced in December 1949. The program was one of nine AFRS shows that were ended as a result of a budget cut by the Secretary of Defense.

== Dick Tracy in B Flat ==
One memorable program, No. 162, a 55-minute musical adaptation of Dick Tracy, was broadcast on February 15, 1945. Bing Crosby had the title role in Dick Tracy in B Flat with Dinah Shore as Tess Truheart and Jimmy Durante as The Mole. The supporting cast included Judy Garland, Cass Daley, Frank Sinatra, Frank Morgan, Bob Hope, Harry von Zell, Jerry Colonna, Lou Crosby, the Andrews Sisters and the Joe Lilley Chorus. The show managed to do what Tracy's creator, cartoonist Chester Gould, had never done—marry Tracy to Tess. The act opened with a Tracy–Tess wedding scene and song—“Oh Happy, Happy, Happy Wedding Day” which faded into the sound of an auto, the squeal of tyres, a machine gun burst and three pistol shots. Subsequent wedding scenes were interrupted by a bank robbery, a kidnapping and a hold-up with 13 people killed. "Most of the songs were clever parodies and the entire show was one big laugh from beginning to end."

The program generally ran for 30 minutes outside of holiday and other specials.

== Spinoff ==
A spinoff series, Request Performance, aired on CBS in 1945–46.

== Revival ==
In 2009, the Pentagon Channel revived the show with some of today's newest acts.

== Similar radio programs ==
The AFRS produced several similar radio music and variety programs during World War II including the following.

- Mail Call
- G.I. Journal
- Jubilee
- GI Jive
