= Consumer service =

Testing of most consumer products

Consumer services refers to the formulation, deformulation, technical consulting and testing of most consumer products, such as food, herbs, beverages, vitamins, pharmaceuticals, cosmetics, hair products, household cleaners, paints, plastics, metals, waxes, coatings, minerals, ceramics, construction materials plus water, indoor air quality testing, non-medical forensic testing and failure analysis.

It involves services in a wide variety of fields such as biological, chemical, physical, engineering and Web-based services.

== Web-based consumer services ==
As the Web has evolved, it has changed from an Information orientation to a Service orientation. Physical services of all kinds—including, but not limited to, retail, supply chain, customer care, banking, and auction—have web counterparts, for B2B, B2C, and C2C businesses. Online appointments, online consultation, and online bill-pay have become increasingly common as web-based consumer services.

== Mergers and acquisitions ==
Between 1985 and 2018 around 90,700 deals within the consumer service sector have been announced. These deals cumulate to an overall value of around 2,031 bil. USD.

There have been three M&A waves in 2000, 2007 and 2016 with a current all time in 2017, where 5,839 deals with a value of 152 bil. USD have been announced.

== Regulatory frameworks for consumer product testing ==
In many jurisdictions, consumer product testing and safety assurance are governed by regulatory frameworks that assign responsibility for testing, labeling, and safety substantiation to manufacturers and importers rather than the testing service providers themselves. In the United States, the Federal Food, Drug, and Cosmetic Act grants the Food and Drug Administration (FDA) authority to oversee the safety of food, dietary supplements, cosmetics, and other consumer products. While the FDA does not require specific pre-market testing for most cosmetic products or ingredients, except for certain color additives, companies are responsible for ensuring that products are safe and properly labeled before they are marketed, and may perform testing to substantiate product safety and quality.

Federal regulations have also been updated to strengthen safety substantiation requirements for cosmetics under the Modernization of Cosmetics Regulation Act of 2022, which directs manufacturers to maintain records supporting the adequacy of their safety substantiation.
