= United States cyber-diplomacy =

Cyber-diplomacy is the evolution of public diplomacy to include and use the new platforms of communication in the 21st century. As explained by Jan Melissen in The New Public Diplomacy: Soft Power in International Relations, cyber-diplomacy “links the impact of innovations in communication and information technology to diplomacy.” Cyber-diplomacy is also known as or is part of public diplomacy 2.0, Digital diplomacy, EDiplomacy, and virtual diplomacy. Cyber-diplomacy has as its underpinnings that, “it recognizes that new communication technologies offer new opportunities to interact with a wider public by adopting a network approach and making the most of an increasingly multicentric global, interdependent system.”

Seal of the United States Department of State.

Secretary of State Hillary Clinton discusses 21st Century Statecraft.

U.S. cyber-diplomacy is led by the United States Department of State and is a new tool in fulfilling the U.S. public diplomacy mission. As stated by Under Secretary of State for Public Diplomacy and Public Affairs, the mission of American public diplomacy “is to support the achievement of U.S. foreign policy goals and objectives, advance national interests, and enhance national security by informing and influencing foreign publics and by expanding and strengthening the relationship between the people and government of the United States and citizens of the rest of the world.” Even though the United States had engaged in cyber-diplomacy under President George W. Bush in 2006, the United States officially launched its cyber-diplomacy campaign in 2009. The development of cyber-diplomacy by the United States is a response to the shifts in international relations by extending the reach of U.S. diplomacy beyond government-to-government communications. The U.S. is adapting its statecraft by reshaping its diplomatic agendas to meet old challenges in new ways and by utilizing America's innovation. Cyber-Diplomacy as identified by the United States Department of State, “encompasses a wide range of U.S. interests in cyberspace. These include not only cyber security and Internet freedom, but also Internet governance, military uses of the Internet, innovation and economic growth. Cyberspace has also become a foreign policy issue in multilateral fora, in our bilateral relationships, and in our relationships with industry and civil society.”

== State Department: 21st century statecraft ==
Cyber-diplomacy was embraced by the United States Department of State in the commencement of 21st century statecraft, utilizing YouTube, multimedia and social media to reach publics, in 2009. The U.S. Department of State's official explanation of it is, “The complementing of traditional foreign policy tools with newly innovated and adapted instruments of statecraft that fully leverages the networks, technologies, and demographics of our interconnected world.” “The First Quadrennial Diplomacy and Development Review of 2010”, explains 21st century diplomacy as the United States’ adaptation to an increasingly varied set of actors who influence national debates, such as an increasing number of states capable of acting on their own diplomatic agendas, corporations, transnational networks, foundations, NGOs, religious groups and citizens themselves. The incentive to create and embrace U.S. cyber-diplomacy and 21st century statecraft is to connect the private and civic sectors with U.S. foreign policy efforts by utilizing new resources; connection technologies and expanding, facilitating, and streamlining our public-private partnership process. Secretary of State Hillary Clinton explained the concept as "We're working to leverage the power and potential in what I call 21st century statecraft. Part of our approach is to embrace new tools, like using cell phones for mobile banking or to monitor elections. But we're also reaching to the people behind these tools, the innovators and entrepreneurs themselves." The efforts by the U.S. Department of State in cyber-diplomacy has led the State Department to currently have 230 Facebook pages, 80 Twitter accounts, 55 channels on YouTube and 40 accounts on Flickr. The State Department has also founded many cyber-diplomacy programs and initiatives. Some of these programs are Dipnote, Digital Outreach Team, Opinion Space, Democracy Dialogues and Civil Society 2.0.

=== 21st century statecraft leadership: the Under Secretary for Public Diplomacy and Public Affairs ===
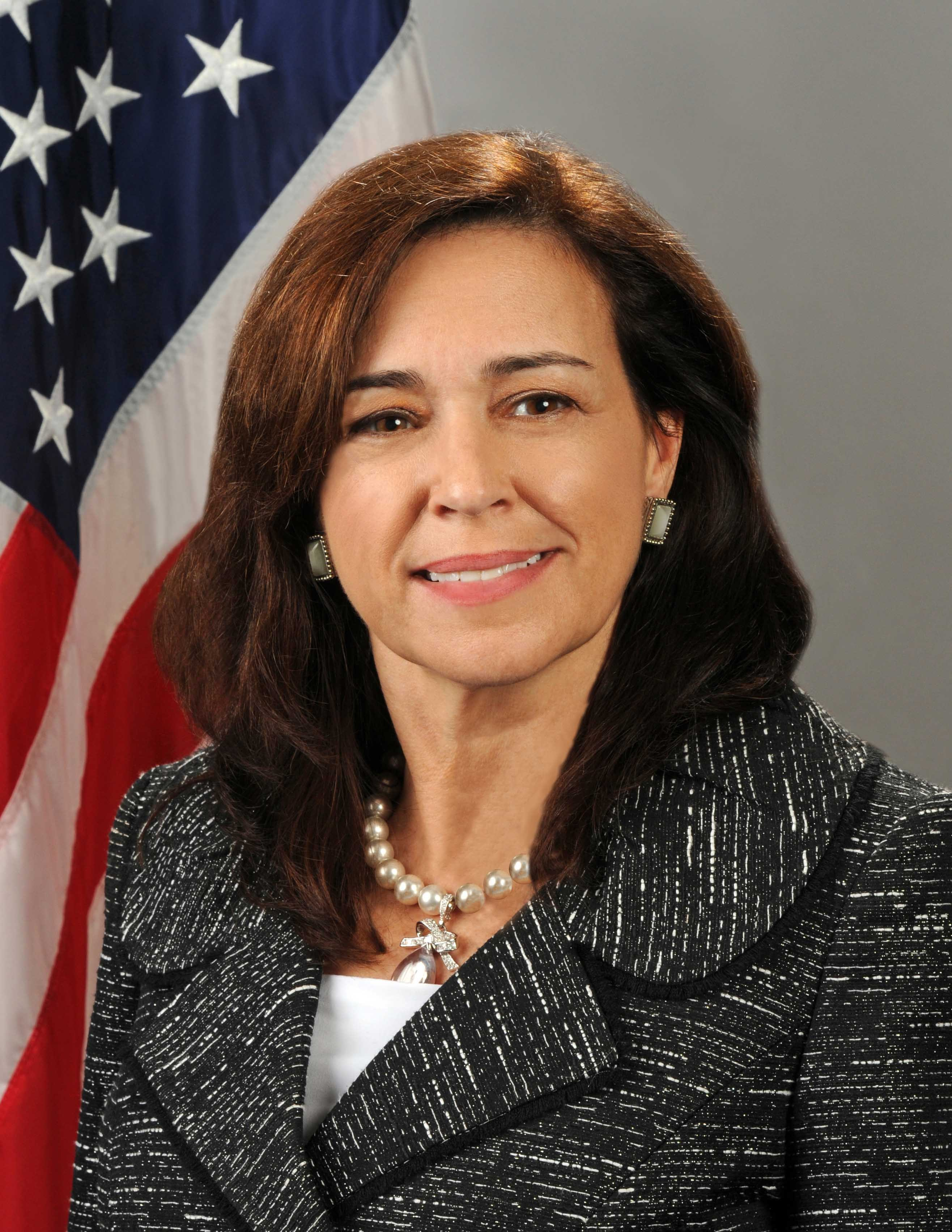
The Under Secretary for Public Diplomacy and Public Affairs Tara D. Sonenshine.

U.S. public diplomacy is led by the Under Secretary of State for Public Diplomacy and Public Affairs, currently Tara D. Sonenshine. Sonenshine assumed the position of Under Secretary of State for Public Diplomacy and Public Affairs on April 5, 2012. The duty and responsibility of the Under Secretary for Public Diplomacy and Public Affairs is to "lead America's public diplomacy outreach, which includes communications with international audiences, cultural programming, academic grants, educational exchanges, international visitor programs, and U.S. government efforts to confront ideological support for terrorism." The Under Secretary also manages the Bureau of Educational and Cultural Affairs, Public Affairs, the Bureau of International Information Programs, and participates in foreign policy development.

== Programs and initiatives ==
=== DipNote ===
DipNote was created in 2007 and opened a platform for the U.S. State Department to engage foreign publics through blogs. It encourages open conversation in regards to the United States and public diplomacy. Part of the philosophy of DipNote is to accept negative and positive feedback from participants and in doing so assess the temperature of foreign publics. DipNote was reformed in 2009 with the launch of 21st Century Statecraft by the State Department. This expanded the role and platform of engagement by DipNote personnel. One of the new purposes of DipNote is to inform people about the travels, speeches, and efforts of Secretary of State Hillary Clinton, State Department employees and diplomats around the world. Another new purpose of DipNote is the establishment of communication, creation of narrative and the translation of President Obama's speeches. DipNote has expanded its dissemination of information to include translations of President Obama's speeches, into different languages and then share the president's speeches through several Twitter accounts. The goal is to make America's public diplomacy more accessible to people who do not speak English and receive their information through the internet.

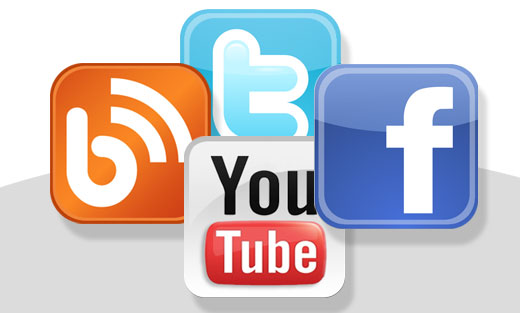
Social Media Platforms.

==== President Obama's Cairo speech ====
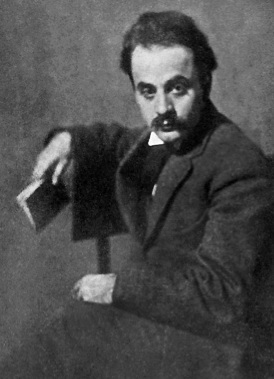
Gibran Khalil Gibran.

One of the undertakings by the Digital Outreach Team occurred on June 4, 2009, when President Barack Obama gave a speech addressing the Muslim world, from Cairo, Egypt. President Obama's speech was an attempt to foster change in the perception of the United States. His speech discussed the new beginnings and relations between the West and the Middle East. Between June and December in 2009, the DOT opened thirty discussion threads on nineteen Arab and Russian centered websites, where the primary conversation was Obama's Cairo speech.

==== American narrative ====
Another example of a DOT initiative is the narrative of Gibran Kahlil Gibran. One of the DOT members followed the life and work of Gibran Kahlil Gibran, a Lebanese-American poet and artist. This project creates a narrative of an American who is of Middle Eastern descent and his life within the United States. Former Under Secretary of State, Charlotte Beers, stated, the use of “virtual reality to see a small town in America, to have an interview, to listen to someone recite the Declaration of Independence…that’s the goal,” of creating an American narrative. The hope is that exporting the American narrative, such as the one of Mr. Gibran's, makes American values and ideals tangible.

=== Opinion Space ===
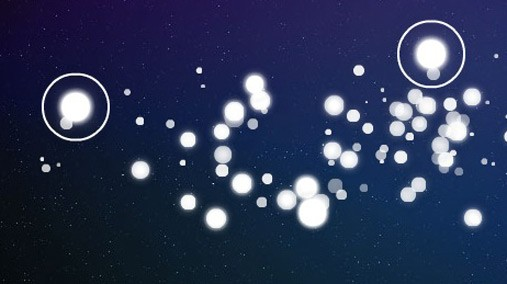
Opinion Space 3.0

Opinion Space is a website created by the United States Department of State and the University of California at Berkeley Center for New Media. It allows people to express and register their views on a number of topics, from politics to economics. When participants register their view, they are informed where they stand on a particular issue, relative to the other participants. On February 15, 2011, Opinion Space 3.0 was launched by the U.S. Department of State. Opinion Space 3.0 uses a gaming program that incorporates methods from polling, collaborative filtering and multidimensional visualization. The program then organizes the information and displays the feedback in patterns and trends as they develop. It invites anyone from around the world to participate in discussion and evaluate the responses of others.

=== Democracy Dialogues ===
Democracy Dialogues is a multilingual interactive website established by the U.S. Department of State in 2006. It is a platform to encourage shared discussion about democratic principles with people outside of the United States. The web based discussion focuses on the principles of democracy and every two months a new democratic theme is featured.

=== Virtual Student Foreign Service ===
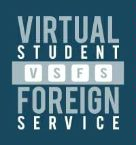
Virtual Student Foreign Service.

The Virtual Student Foreign Service was launched in 2009 by Secretary of State Hillary Clinton. Virtual Student Foreign Service partners American students with our global diplomatic missions, to conduct outreach online while harnessing the knowledge of U.S. citizens. Responsibilities of the selected students for the Virtual Student Foreign Service are:

- Develop and implement a public relations campaign using social media sites like Facebook, Twitter, MySpace, YouTube, etc. to communicate and reach out to youth
- Conduct research on the economic situation, prepare graphic representations of economic data, and prepare informational material for the U.S. Embassy website
- Create a system to gather and analyze media coverage on a set of topics including environment, health, and trade
- Research IT-based interventions that have been successful in higher education, particularly in teacher training
- Write and contribute biweekly articles to the U.S. Embassy's Facebook page on topics such as internet, computer science/technology, history, and literature
- Develop a series of professional instructional video clips to be published by the U.S. Embassy
- Survey social media efforts of U.S. diplomatic posts, NGOs, and private companies around the world to help establish best practices in a U.S. Embassy's social media outreach business plan.

Introduction to the Virtual Student Foreign Service Program.

=== Civil Society 2.0 ===
Civil Society 2.0 is connecting the information and communications technology community with civil society organizations around the world and provides civil society organizations with access to the latest technologies. According to the U.S. Department of State, it is a program that supports civil society efforts worldwide because civil society helps to make communities more prosperous and stable. Civil Society 2.0 uses text messages, websites, and social media platforms to connect the numerous participants. The State Department sends technologists to specific regions so they can teach the local population how to use technology and therefore establish a technological society. The technologists will specifically educate the people on:

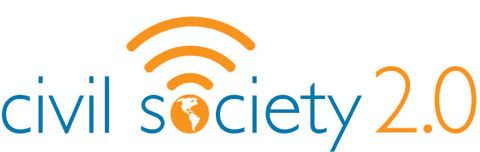
Civil Society 2.0

- How to build a website
- How to blog
- How to launch a text messaging campaign
- How to build an online community
- How to leverage social networks for a cause

=== Virtual Presence Post (VPP) ===
Virtual Presence Post is a tool which helps a U.S. Embassy's Principal Officer utilize available diplomatic outreach instruments. VPPs are usually composed of one or two officers that manage an internet site explaining U.S. policy, providing updates and news on U.S. relations with the host country and are accessible for dialogue. The communication of the VPP includes topics such as, travel, programs, media, and technology, in an effort to improve U.S. engagement with specific communities where the U.S. has no physical diplomatic facilities. Currently, there are 43 active VPPs around the world, some of them are in Zhengzhou, China, Chittagong, Bangladesh, the Seychelles, San Marino, Somalia, and Gaza.

=== X-Life Games ===
The X-Life Games was launched in June 2008. The Games were developed by MetroStar Systems along with Neal Hallford, J.R. Register, and Ghafur Remtulla and funded by the U.S. Department of State. X-Life Games is an English-based mobile game that fosters cultural exchange between Arabic, Persian, and English speaking cultures with a focus upon the current technological savvy generation. The expectation of the mobile game is to "portray American culture and convey fundamental values that are present in American culture, such as; tolerance, freedom, and the respect for cultural and religious differences." The launch of X-Life Games is to encourage cultural bridging, while decaying barriers that impede mutual understanding, through a video game. Cultural bridging embodied in a video game reaches across all generations, especially the current one being raised in an ever sophisticated and technological world. In participating, the users begin by choosing an X-Life character. They then learn and use skills acquired through everyday experiences. Each phase of the game allows the user to apply those skills to improve themselves and their world. Ali Reza Manouchehri, Chief Executive Officer of MetroStar Systems, discussing this video-game, stated the “Middle East and the Persian Gulf youth will have the opportunity to experience the dynamism and vitality of American life. X-Life projects the fundamental values that Americans cherish: tolerance, freedom, and respect for cultural and religious differences.”
