= GI Jill =

American disc jockey

- Born: Martha Wilkerson; May 4, 1918; Roanoke, Virginia, US
- Died: February 9, 1999 (aged 80); Pukalani, Hawaii, US
- Occupations: Disc jockey, radio host
- Known for: GI Jive program on Armed Forces Radio Service during World War II
- Spouse: Robert Morton Werner (m. 1939; died 1990)
- Children: 2 daughters

Martha Wilkerson Werner (May 4, 1918 – February 9, 1999), known as GI Jill during WWII, was an American disc jockey and radio host best known for presenting the GI Jive music program on the Armed Forces Radio Service (AFRS) for World War II soldiers. She is noted for the positive effect that her personality and music selections made on American troops' morale, and she was "universally credited with being the No. 1 overseas attraction" on AFRS. By the end of January 1945 she had made 870 broadcasts.

== Early life ==
Martha Wilkerson was born on May 4, 1918 in Roanoke, Virginia. Her father Sexton was a title artist and designer for movie studios including 20th Century Fox, and her mother was a screenwriter and theatre actress. Her brother was a lieutenant in the U.S Navy, and her inability to send him letters is what inspired her to develop broadcasts to soldiers that featured recorded music, personal updates, and friendly talk.

== Wartime radio career ==
Wilkerson proposed the radio show, and officials from the United States Office of War Information approved. The Jack and Jill show debuted, broadcast from San Francisco via shortwave radio, with her husband Mort Werner billed as "Jack" and herself as "Jill". Wilkerson never revealed her real name on air, and few knew she was married with two young daughters. She began hosting the program as a solo presenter when Werner joined the Army. An article in Yank, the Army Weekly noted, "For a long time, Army authorities admit, Jill's program was the only link the men at Guadal[canal] had with the folks back home."

In addition to popular music, the broadcasts featured birth announcements and letters from soldiers' wives. Due to the program's popularity, AFRS officials moved Wilkerson to Los Angeles, where she began to broadcast GI Jive for 15 minutes daily over 400 Army radio stations. The program included interview with numerous stars such as Bob Hope, Bing Crosby, Frank Sinatra and Dinah Shore amongst others.

Jill was sometimes called "America's answer to Tokyo Rose" and Axis Sally but Jill said later that was not the point because American servicemen did not take broadcasters like Tokyo Rose and Axis Sally seriously. "Our men — those who listened to enemy propaganda — only listened because there was nothing else to do," she said. American diplomat and National Security Council member William Lloyd Stearman wrote in his 2013 memoir that GI Jill "did so much to bolster our morale. She came across like a wholesome girl-next-door who began each radio show with 'Hi-ya, fellas! This is GI Jill with the GI Jive.' ... We all loved her."

GI Jill built rapport with listeners, and answered as many as 500 letters from servicemen each week with a photograph of herself included with the letter. Many letters were requests for certain music records. Some listeners sent hand-made trinkets such as a bracelet fashioned from a crashed airplane's broken window, and a crudely inscribed heart-shaped pendant saying, "To Jill from Lou, 1944". Some listeners mailed her pictures of themselves, leading her to comment, "I think I was the only person in the world who had pinup boys." Most of these letters and photographs were destroyed in a fire at her family's Hollywood, California.

== Reflections and later career ==
Wilkerson's success as GI Jill led to a similar radio broadcast in India from Virginia C. Claudon Allen, sometimes called "the GI Jill of India", to counteract broadcasts from Radio Tokyo. Wilkerson began second program, AEF Jukebox.

Following the war, Wilkerson wrote the screenplay for the film Hard, Fast and Beautiful (1951), and scripts for some episodes of The Virginian in addition to her continued radio career.

Wilkerson considered herself to be separate from her "GI Jill" radio personality, saying in 1966, "The men overseas created Jill. They made her what they wanted her to be — the girl back home." Reflecting on her experiences in broadcasting, she called her work as GI Jill, "the most important thing I've ever done in my life".

== Personal life ==
On March 18, 1939, Martha Wilkerson married Robert Morton "Mort" Werner, a broadcasting director who was serving as program director of the radio station KMTR in Los Angeles, where she worked at the time. He produced some of her programs. They went on to have two daughters. In the early 1960s, Werner was president of the American Academy of Arts and Sciences. By the mid 1960s, he was vice president of NBC and the couple lived in Scarsdale, New York with their teenage daughter.

After she retired in 1975, the couple moved to Maui, Hawaii, where Mort Werner eventually died in April 1990 from kidney failure at age 73. Martha Wilkerson Werner died on February 9, 1999, aged 80.
