= Virginia Claudon Allen =

American wartime broadcaster (born 1919)

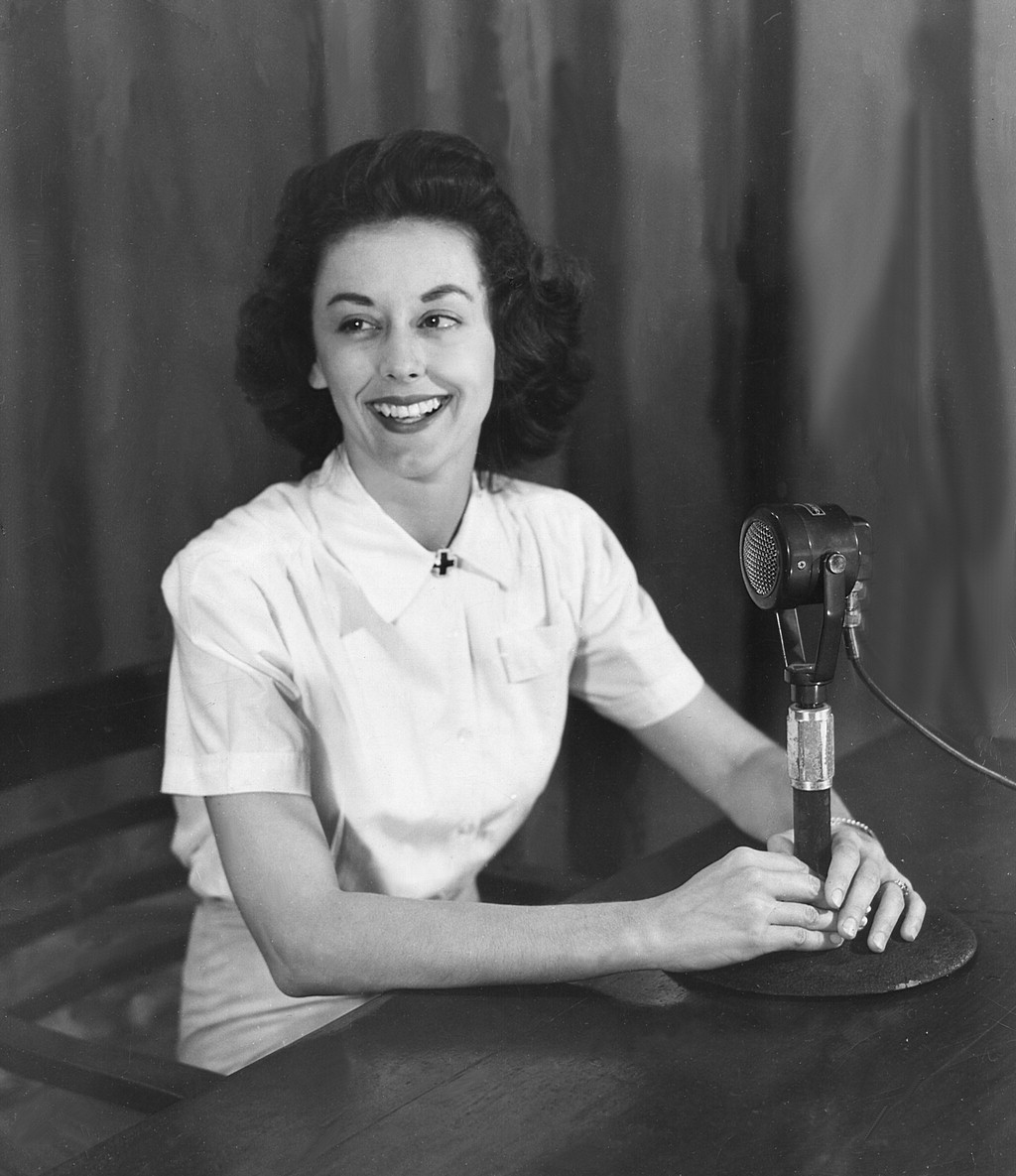
- Born: Virginia James Claudon; July 26, 1919 (age 107)
- Education: William and Mary
- Occupation: Radio broadcaster
- Years active: World War II
- Known for: "GI Jill"
- Spouse: James Scribner Allen
- Children: Pamela Allen and Jeffrey Allen

Virginia James Claudon Allen (born July 26, 1919) is an American former radio personality who was a civilian employee for Army Intelligence and an American Red Cross volunteer stationed in India during World War II. She hosted a nightly radio program to counter-act the broadcasts of Tokyo Rose. Like Martha Wilkerson's GI Jive show, U.S. military and civilian officials viewed broadcasts such as Allen's for the Armed Forces Radio Service as an essential support for troop morale.

== Early years of the war ==
Allen graduated from the College of William & Mary in 1940. When the war broke out she volunteered at Ream Army General Hospital in Palm Beach, Florida. She then joined Army Intelligence and worked at Morrison Field Airforce Base (now Palm Beach Air Force Base). After the death of her fiancé, Lieutenant Langdon Long, in Africa, she requested an overseas assignment with the Red Cross. She entered the Red Cross as a Second Lieutenant and was sent to Fort Belvoir for basic training.

== "GI Jill" in Agra, India ==
Allen arrived to India late in WWII, and was given command of the "Repairadise Club" of the Agra air force base, one of 16 stations in the Indian-Burma theatre and a key depot and repair facility for the India-China Division, Air Transport Command.

Allen described her mission and the conditions of the assignment: "We had no individual radios. No U.S. newspapers. And, of course, no yet-to-be invented T.V. The movies shown on benches after dark were black and white and mostly Westerns. Homesickness was the major malady; and it was a primary effort on our part to keep the GIs busy with activities such as club competitions in volleyball, golf (a two hole, sandy, home-made course), basketball and baseball."

"My radio messages were always upbeat," Allen explained after the war, "And the music was wonderful. Being 'on air' 55 minutes nightly was part of my weekly duty. We had great respect for the service men who seemed to appreciate everything we tried to do for them."
