= Online consultation =

Governmernt consultation via the internet

Online consultations or e-consultations refer to an exchange between government and citizens using the Internet. They are one form of online deliberation. Further, online consultation consists in using the Internet to ask a group of people their opinion on one or more specific topics, allowing for trade-offs between participants. Generally, an agency consults a group of people to get their thoughts on an issue when a project or a policy is being developed or implemented, e.g. to identify or access options, or to evaluate ongoing activities. This enables governments to draft more citizen-centered policy.

As the Internet gains popularity with the public for voicing opinion, citizen participation in policy development through cyberspace is changing the face of democracy. The rise of the Internet has given way to buzzwords such as e-democracy, referring to citizen participation in politics, government issues and policy development through electronic technologies and the Internet, and eGovernment, pertaining to providing citizens with government information and services online. Online consultation is an extension of these concepts. Through online engagement, government is enabled to hold interactive dialogues with the public as they have a more direct route to citizen opinion via the Internet.

The California Report Card (CRC) facilitates online consultation, working to support collaboration between citizens and the government though the Internet. Gavin Newsom, Lt. Governor of California, and the Center for Information Technology Research in the Interest of Society at University of California, Berkeley jointly launched the CRC in January 2014. The CRC allows for Californians to vote online on six timely issues. The site then redirects users to an electronic "cafe" using Principal Component Analysis. In the "cafe", participants can textually submit their own suggestions and assess the ideas of other users. The CRC offers a means of connecting the public to the California government.

While this definition is framed in the Canadian context, other countries like the UK, Denmark, Scotland, and Australia can also be considered leaders in the field. These and many other countries are integrating online consultations and engagement using various methods and for a range of purposes. The European Union also utilises online consultations. These complement face-to-face consultations and help to create greater transparency of the democratic process. Online consultations are also increasingly being used by the United Nations and its Specialized Agencies. The Food and Agriculture Organization of the UN hosts online consultations to allow for more inclusive drafting processes of policy guidelines, reports and strategy papers. The Global Forum on Food Security and Nutrition (FSN Forum) is tasked with carrying out many of these consultations.

== Channels ==
Online consultations and engagement activities can utilize:

- Websites, discussion boards, and electronic mailing lists, which have the ability to aid in policy development by providing the public with pertinent information and engaging them in order to extract feedback on issues.
- Weblogs and real time online chat that can often put the public in direct contact with government officials, such as their MP, deputy or other political figure with whom they can share opinion and concerns

== See also ==
- Accessibility
- Chat rooms
- Collaborative software
- Direct democracy
- Intranet and Extranet
- Moderation
- Online deliberation
- Participatory democracy
- Privacy
- Security
- Usability
