= Opinion Space =

Social media platform

Developed at UC Berkeley, "Opinion Space" (also known as The Collective Discovery Engine) is a social media technology designed to help communities generate and exchange ideas about important issues and policies. Version 1.0 was launched on April 4, 2009, at UC Berkeley, and explored the question "Do you think legalizing marijuana is a good idea?" It has since undergone 4 different iterations, and been used in partnership with various organizations including The Occupy movement (Version 4.0, 5/24/2013) and the African Robots Network (Version 4.0, 5/25/2013). Opinion Space has also been used in collaboration with the United States State Department and the University of California's Berkeley Center for New Media (Version 2.0, 12/1/2009 and Version 3.0, 2/25/2012) to gain public perspective on foreign policy issues. Then U.S. Secretary of State Hillary Rodham Clinton explained, "Opinion Space will harness the power of connection technologies to provide a unique forum for international dialogue. This is...an opportunity to extend our engagement beyond the halls of government directly to the people of the world" (2010).

The website uses data visualization and statistical analysis to present and develop public opinion and ideas. Opinion Space is a self-organizing system that uses an intuitive graphical "map" that displays patterns, trends, and insights as they emerge and employs the wisdom of crowds to identify and highlight the most insightful ideas. The system uses a game model that incorporates techniques from deliberative polling, collaborative filtering, and multidimensional visualization.

== See also ==
- Foreign policy of the United States
- Emergent democracy
- Deliberative opinion poll
- Online consultation
- Recommender system

== Scholarly work ==
- Sanjay Krishnan and Ken Goldberg (June 2013). "Distributed Spectral Dimensionality Reduction for Visualizing Textual Data" (PDF). International Conference on Machine Learning (ICML) Workshop on Spectral Learning Methods, Atlanta, GA. Archived from the original (PDF) on 2014-08-11.
- Sanjay Krishan, Ken Goldberg, Yuko Okubo, Kanji Uchino (June 2013). "Using a Social Media Platform to Explore How Social Media Can Enhance Primary and Secondary Learning" (PDF). The Sixth Conference of MIT's Learning International Networks Consortium. Archived from the original (PDF) on 2016-01-09.
- Michael Silverman, Elmira Bakhshalian, Laura Hillman (March 2013). "Social media and employee voice: the current landscape" (PDF). CIPD Research Report on Sustainable Organization Performance. Archived from the original (PDF) on 2013-05-09.
- David Wong, Siamak Faridani, Ephrat Bitton, Bjoern Hartmann, Ken Goldberg. (May 2011). "The Diversity Donut: Enabling Participant Control Over the Diversity of Recommended Responses" (PDF). ACM International Conference on Computer Human Interaction (CHI). Vancouver, BC, Canada. Archived from the original (PDF) on May 9, 2013.
- Siamak Faridani, Ephrat Bitton, Kimiko Ryokai, Ken Goldberg (April 2010). "Opinion Space: A Scalable Tool for Browsing Online Comments" (PDF). ACM International Conference on Computer Human Interaction (CHI). Atlanta, GA.
- Ephrat Bitton (2009). "A Spatial Model for Collaborative Filtering of Comments in an Online Discussion Forum". Proceedings of the third ACM conference on Recommender systems - Rec Sys '09. Proceedings of the ACM Conference on Recommender Systems. p. 393. doi:10.1145/1639714.1639797. ISBN 9781605584355. S2CID 17631067.
