= GI Jive =

Radio program by the Armed Forces Radio Service

GI Jive was a 15-minute radio program transmitted by the Armed Forces Radio Service for entertainment of soldiers in World War II. Its initial frequency of five days per week later increased to six days per week. It was included in the group of "programs proposed for production on the AFRS's initial schedule". GI Jive differed from AFRS programs like Command Performance and Mail Call in that it used a disc jockey format, with someone playing popular recordings of the day. In contrast, Command Performance and Mail Call broadcast live performances by popular entertainers.

GI Jive initially featured a guest DJ for each broadcast; some were civilian celebrities, while others were servicemen. In May 1943, however, the format changed to having one regular host, Martha Wilkerson, who was known on the air as "GI Jill". Patrick Worley, in This Is the American Forces Network, called Wilkerson "probably the most popular performer on AFRS, and certainly the one who made the biggest impact on the troops' morale." He summarized her appeal as follows:

It was a simple formula -- a collection of record requests, some cheerful banter from GI Jill, and occasional interviews with celebrities such as Bing Crosby, Frank Sinatra and Dinah Shore. It was the personality of Jill that made the program. She had a distinctive, charmingly reedy voice, and she was, to quote one listener, "warm, affectionate, intimate. Perfect for homesick servicemen far from home". To the GI she was the girl back home, and she had a nice homely [sic] touch.

He added:

The effect she had on her listeners is summed up in this letter from a sergeant in the Pacific: "Your cheerful voice does wonders to our morale. Tokyo Rose is also on the air. It's as if two women of enemy countries were battling for men's minds. I'm glad you're winning, Jill." She was sometimes referred to as America's answer to Tokyo Rose and Axis Sally, but unlike those two ladies there was never any hint of propaganda in any of her programs.

Wilkerson's personal touch extended to replying to mail from soldiers. The GI Jive entry in The Directory of the Armed Forces Radio Service Series noted, "She attempted to answer each letter sent in and included a picture of herself." In 1945, it was reported that Martha Wilkerson could boast of receiving one-fourth of all the fan mail inspired by the Armed Forces Radio Service's 122 air shows.

Wilkerson's usual closing line was "Good morning to some of you, good afternoon to some more of you, and to the rest of you — good night."

The total number of GI Jive programs broadcast appears to be unavailable, but one reference book lists "Prog. 2322" as the highest number in a sampling of content of different episodes. Therefore, it seems safe to say that the number of episodes ran well into the thousands.

As of 2024 GI Jive can still be heard, as it is repeated nightly on the UK 1940s radio station.
