= DipNote =

DipNote is the official blog of the United States Department of State. It was launched on September 25, 2007, with the first post by U.S. Assistant Secretary of State for Public Affairs Sean McCormack. It was revised in 2009, with the Departments' 21st Century Statecraft initiative. DipNote works in conjunction with other public diplomacy programs, as part of former Secretary of State Hillary Clinton's smart power initiatives.

== Link ==
- DipNote: Official blog of the US Department of State

== See also ==
- Diplopedia
- Office of eDiplomacy
- State Department Sounding Board
