= Jubilee (radio program) =

AFRS radio program featuring African-American musicians and singers

Jubilee is an AFRS radio program that featured African American musicians and singers. It was broadcast to servicemen via AFRS from 1942 to 1953.

Jubilee was conceived at least in part as a morale-building service for African American troops stationed overseas. The wartime host was Ernie "Bubbles" Whitman.

Most of the shows were recorded before live audiences in Los Angeles. The series emerged as an important piece of black heritage. Its War Department status exempted the performing artists from the union-mandated recording bans of 1942-43 and 1947–48 and many of the shows contain unique performances.
