= Clandestine radio broadcasting =

Clandestine radio broadcasting stations are unlicensed, illegal stations that broadcast to countries that prohibit or limit the expression of dissident political viewpoints. The stations are frequently operated by revolutionary and counterrevolutionary groups or intelligence services such as the U.S. Central Intelligence Agency (C.I.A.), whose intent is to undermine the governments of countries to which they broadcast.

== Description ==
The transmitters of these stations frequently claim to be located in the countries to which they broadcast, but are actually located outside the country, particularly when they broadcast on shortwave frequencies. As an example, the C.I.A. operated a clandestine station called “Nasha Rossiya” during the 1950s that claimed to be operated by native Russian dissidents, but whose shortwave transmitter was actually based in Athens, Greece. Similarly, a radio station called “Freedom Station 904” claimed to be operated by dissident West Germans within that country, but actually broadcast on the mediumwave bandwidth from Magdeburg, East Germany, which controlled the station. Freedom Station 904 signed on shortly after the West German Communist Party was banned in 1956. The station's purpose was to make it appear that West Germany, like East German, silenced political opponents.

Clandestine radio stations are sometimes referred to as pirate stations, but this term usually refers to commercial, offshore stations such as Radio Caroline and Radio Veronica, that broadcast popular music to Europe from ship-based transmitters during the 1960s. Unlike clandestine radio stations, whose purpose is to undermine or overthrow governments, pirate stations are operated to make money.

== The Three Categories of Political Radio ==
Intelligence and communication experts typically divide political broadcasting into three color-coded tiers based on transparency:

- White Radio: The station is completely transparent about its location, ownership, and purpose. Examples include official state-sponsored networks like Radio Free Europe or Voice of America. White stations are not clandestine stations.
- Grey Radio: The station is run by an indigenous dissident groups inside a target country, or the group uses a transmitter located outside the country to send the messages to the target country. An example of a grey station is Radio Watan, which broadcast from within Syria during that country's civil war.
- Black Radio: The most deceptive tier. These are clandestine operations run by one country or faction but completely disguised as if they are originating from the enemy's own government or military forces to create confusion.

== Revolutionary radio operations ==
Clandestine stations operated by revolutionary and counterrevolutionary organizations usually go on the air when civil unrest occurs and attempt to encourage or even inflame the unrest. Beginning in the late 1950s, Cuban opponents of dictator Fulgencio Batista, operated a number of clandestine radio stations, which stoked opposition to the dictatorship. The most famous of these stations was “Radio Rebelde,” operated by rebels commanded by Fidel Castro, which broadcast from a hidden location in Cuba's Sierra Maestra mountains. After the Taliban government was ousted by the United States in 2001, the Afghan Taliban started a clandestine radio station called “Voice of Shariat.” Other low-power Taliban stations signed on after that, which criticized the U.S. invasion and Afghan government, as well as airing hymns and Islamic fundamentalist commentaries. The stations were so successful that U.S. and the Afghan governments tried to counterprogram and jam the broadcasts.”

During the Syrian civil war, a number of clandestine stations took to the airwaves broadcasting programs against the dynastic regime of Bashar al-Assad. The stations had names such as “Radio Watan” (“Radio Homeland”), “Radio al-Kul”(“Radio for Everyone”), “Radio Hara” (“Neighborhood Radio”) and “Radio Alwan” (“Colors Radio.”). Some, like Radio al-Kul, broadcast from areas in Syria controlled by rebels; some broadcast from abroad, including “Radio Alwan,” which had broadcast from Turkey. As in Afghanistan, clandestine radio broadcasting was used to disseminate anti-government messages because printing presses and paper were scarce in rebel-held areas, and electricity and internet connectivity spotty.

Clandestine stations can be distinguished by whether they are “black” or “gray.” Black stations are stations like “Freedom Station 904” that misrepresent their purpose, their sponsorship and even the location of their transmitters. These stations are usually sponsored by governments that are adversaries of the countries to which the stations broadcast or by intelligence agencies seeking to advance the interests of their countries.

Gray stations are usually operated by revolutionary or counterrevolutionary groups and may be, but are not always, located in liberated areas of the countries to which they broadcast. As previously mentioned, “Radio Rebelde,” “Radio al-Kuhl and the Taliban stations had broadcast from within the countries to which they broadcast. On the other hand, “Oggi In Italia” (Today in Italy) broadcast programs and news of the Italian Communist Party to Italy from a transmitter in Prague until 1970. The station was unplugged by Czechoslovak authorities because the station voiced opposition to the Soviet invasion of Czechoslovakia in 1968, which deposed the liberal communist government of Alexander Dubcek. The closing of "Oggi in Italia" demonstrates that clandestine stations operating from abroad are dependent on the largesse of their host country. On the other hand, the Syrian clandestine station “Radio Fresh” was destroyed when Syrian army helicopters dropped barrel bombs on the building that housed its transmitter, showing the danger that comes from operating a clandestine station within a country where a civil war is taking place.

== Origins ==
Clandestine radio broadcasting began after Adolf Hitler became German Chancellor in 1931. One of the first clandestine stations, an anti-Hitler station, was operated by Otto Strasser, whose brother Gregor Strasser was killed on June 30, 1934 at Hitler's orders during the “Night of the Long Knives.” The Strassers joined the Nazi Party believing that it was actually a socialist party, which it was not. As Gregor Strasser noted, “We National Socialists want the economic revolution involving the nationalization of the economy...We want in place of an exploitative capitalist economic system a real socialism.”

As part of his consolidation of power, Hitler ordered the elimination of left-wing elements in the Nazi party, as well as many of his non-Nazi opponents. Gregor Strasser and many of his allies were murdered during the Night of the Long Knives in order to maintain ideological uniformity in the Nazi party and to eliminate potential rivals to Hitler.

Following Gregor's murder, Otto and some remaining members of the Black Front, as Strasser called the movement, started an anti-Hitler station called the “Voice of the Black Front.” It broadcast to Germany three times daily for an hour from Czechoslovakia, not far from the German border, beginning in September 1934. The station was constructed and maintained by Rudolf Wormys, the former chief engineer of Stuttgard Radio. The broadcasts ended on January 25, 1935 when Wormys was killed by Gestapo agents.

In late 1936, after the formation of the International Brigades that travelled to Spain to defend the Republic from General Francisco Franco’s troops, the International Brigade of the Communist Party of Italy started a clandestine radio station in Barcelona that broadcast anti-fascist propaganda to Italy. The Italian government of Benito Mussolini, along with Nazi Germany, backed Franco’s military uprising. The station, Radio Milano Libertà was established in Barcelona, and was first heard on October 26, 1936. The station claimed to be based in Italy. The broadcasts were aired from 10:45 PM daily on the 28 meter wavelength until the fall of the Republic, when the station went silent.

Between the silencing of “Voice of the Black Front” and the outbreak of World War II, other anti-Nazi clandestine stations operated by Hitler's German opponents went on the air, usually claiming to broadcast from within Germany. These stations were generically referred to as the “German Freedom Station,” thus confusing one clandestine station with another. One station broadcast to Germany from Spain until the defeat of the Spanish Republic in 1939. Although broadcasting from Spain, German officials contended that the broadcasts originated in the Soviet Union, the Nazi's bete noire. (After the fall of Spain and the outbreak of Worlf War II, the station did move to Moscow and was renamed German People's Radio.)

Another more-widely heard German Freedom Station was operated from France by former German Communist Party member Willi Munzenberg, after he broke with Stalin. Following the signing of the Hitler-Stalin Pact in 1939, the German Communist Party denounced Munzenberg's station as an “operation by the French government, which misuses its name for misleading the German and Austrian people, to cheat them, and exploit them for its own imperialist aims.” When France collapsed in 1940, this German Freedom Station went off the air, as Munzenberg attempted to escape the Nazi onslaught. Munzenberg was apparently killed by Soviet NKVD agent who were with Munzenberg when he attempted to flee, although the Communists claimed he committed suicide.

The image of anti-Nazi crusaders operating mobile, German Freedom Stations at their peril from inside Germany captured the imagination of British and U.S. filmmakers, who made two World War II propaganda films, Freedom Radio (1941) and Underground (1941 film), about fictitious clandestine stations operating under the noses of the Gestapo. Both films depicted heroic, well-educated anti-Nazi activists whose relatives were initially Nazi supporters. By the end of both films, the pro-Nazi relatives realized that Nazis were brutal liars, and joined the underground, also participating in German freedom broadcasts. Both end with the station operators being hunted down and killed by the Nazis for their underground activities.

== World War II Clandestine Broadcasting ==
When World War II began, Great Britain established an office called the Special Operations Executive (SOE) that was to conduct subversive warfare. SOE had two branches, SO1, which was to conduct psychological warfare; and SO2, which was to conduct sabotage and guerrilla warfare. Psychological warfare included the operation of clandestine radio stations that broadcast to Nazi Germany, its allies, and occupied countries. The first SO1 station was called “Sender der Europaischen Revolution” (“Radio of the European Revolution”), which began broadcasting anti-Nazi programs to Germany in 1940. Among German emigres who helped found the station was anti-Nazi activist Hilde Meisel. The Sender's broadcasts were produced by members of New Beginning, an organization of exiled German socialists, operating under the supervision of Richard Crossman, a labor party politician, SOE leader, and expert on Germany. The station went off the air in 1942, after the Soviet Union joined the anti-German alliance.

The next clandestine station that SO1 started was called “Frats Roman” (Brother Romanians), which commenced broadcasting on November 10, 1941, two weeks before Romania signed the Tripartite Pact, allying Romania with the Axis powers. On November 15, a third SO1-sponsored clandestine station, “Radio Inconnue,” signed on, broadcasting to German-occupied France from a transmitter in Great Britain, but claiming to originate from a hidden transmitter in Paris. The next day, “Radio Italia” signed on, claiming to be operated by an anti-Mussolini underground that accused the Italian dictator of being Hitler's sychophant. It used the slogan, “Don't believe, don't obey, don't fight.” On November 17, another SO1 clandestine station, “Radio Travail” (“Worker's Radio) started broadcasting to France, claiming to be the voice of the French working class. The November 17 broadcast was the first of more than 550 broadcasts made by Radio Travail. To assure that potential listeners knew where these stations could be heard, SOE operatives in occupied countries distributed and posted stickers announcing the times and frequencies of the clandestine stations in the regions where it operated.

At the end of 1941, SO1 was removed from SOE and placed in a separate entity called the Political Warfare Executive (PWE), which was responsible for aboveground or white propaganda, as well as black or clandestine propaganda. British journalist Sefton Delmer was head of the black propaganda operations. With the creation of the PWE, the British were able to better coordinate their black and white propaganda efforts. By the time PWE was created, Britain had put more than a dozen more clandestine stations on the air, including a Marxist-oriented station, “Rotes Wien,” that broadcast to Austria; an Italian socialist station; and a gray clandestine station that broadcast messages from General De Gaulle's Free French Forces. Most of these stations broadcast from transmitters whose power was 7.5 kilowatts or less. The most famous of these stations was Gustav Siegfried Eins, which broadcast to German troops, claiming to be operated by a patriotic but disgruntled German officer called “Der Chef” (“The Chief”).

In an effort to reach larger areas of Europe, the PWE purchased a 600-kilowatt transmitter built by RCA, which had been in storage. The transmitter was dubbed “Aspidistra” from the lyrics of a popular song. The transmitter’s frequency could be changed, allowing it to broadcast messages from ostensibly different stations. One of the stations that broadcast from the Aspidistra transmitter was a clandestine station called Soldatensender Calais (Soldiers’ Station from Calais), which claimed to be a German-operated armed forces radio station, broadcasting music, entertainment and news to frontline troops. Because of its immense power, the station was able to reach much of Europe, not just German troops on the western front, for whom the station purportedly claimed to broadcast. But unlike real German radio stations, the station carried subtle anti-Nazi reports along with reports on German losses and setbacks, something actual German stations avoided mentioning

Because of its power and its presentation of news that was not available on stations in Germany and German-occupied Europe, the Soldatensender developed a large listenership, particularly for a clandestine station. A survey of German listeners conducted after World War II ended found that 23 percent who listened to non-German stations reported listening to the Soldatensender. Although many of the listeners believed that the station was operated by the Allies, it was deemed safer to listen to than the Voice of America or similar stations because it claimed to be a German station. Listening to Allied stations in Germany was forbidden and listening was punishable, whereas listeners could claim they tuned to a German rather than enemy station when listening to the Soldatensender. Furthermore, German officials did little to counter the Soldatensender’s claim that it was a German station out of fear of drawing attention to it and in so doing, increasing its listenership.

== The Office of Strategic Services' Stations ==
In 1940, President Franklin D. Roosevelt asked William J. Donovan, a former World War I officer who was known as “Wild Bill” Donovan and the 1932 Republican candidate for Governor of New York, to travel to Great Britain on a fact-finding mission to assess Britain’s abilities to singlehandedly fight Germany. Roosevelt wanted to know what aid Britain needed, and what it was doing to fight the war. Donovan arrived in London on July 17, 1940, where he met with Winston Churchill, King George VI, and other political leaders, as well as officials of the SOE, who showed Donovan the highly secret operations of SO1 and SO2.

After returning to the United States, Donovan informed Roosevelt about what he saw, and about Great Britain’s need for military assistance. Donovan had his law firm research the legal basis for transferring military equipment to Great Britain, under a program called Lend-Lease, as well as trying to convince FDR and other political leaders of the need for the United States to establish an intelligence agency similar to what Britain created with the SOE. In June 1941, as it became clear that the United States would soon be involved in the war, FDR appointed Donovan as head of the Office of the Coordinator of Information (COI) which Donovan envisioned as similar to SOE – collecting and synthesizing intelligence, conducting propaganda operations, including clandestine stations, and organizing guerrilla operations inside of occupied territories. For COI, Donovan began recruiting academics with experience collecting and synthesizing information, mass media workers with experience producing radio programs, and attorneys, whom Donovan viewed as sufficiently trained to analyze evidence and presents arguments based on it. One of Donovan’s first COI recruits was Edmond Taylor, who wrote a book titled, The Strategy of Terror, that described how rumors, sabotage and white and clandestine broadcasts worked together to undermine France and bring about its collapse at the Beginning or WWII. Taylor was one of the first COI recruits to be sent to Great Britain to observe and learn the tactics practiced by SO1. Upon his return Taylor became an advocate of organizing underground operations in the way Great Britain had.

Six months after Donovan began organizing the COI, the U.S. entered World War II. Not long after that, the COI was placed under the Joint Chiefs of Staff and on June 13, 1942, the COI was folded into a new agency called the Office of Strategic Services (OSS) of which Donovan was appointed head. After that, Donovan began sending recruits, such as Frederick Cable Oechsner, Gordon Auchincloss and Abraham Polonsky, to Great Britain for training in black propaganda operations. Donovan’s dreams for an agency similar to SO1 were formalized on December 23, 1942, when the Joint Chiefs of Staff issued a directive giving OSS responsibility for “propaganda and warfare phases of psychological warfare.” Based on this directive, Donovan created the Morale Operations Branch within OSS, which was “to incite and spread dissension, confusion and disorder within enemy countries” using secret propaganda from leaflets, radio, print media and word-of-mouth. Having already trained members of OSS in Great Britain on psychological warfare techniques, the next step was to obtain or build transmitters for conducting black radio operations.

In addition to working on clandestine stations operated by the Political Warfare Executive, the Morale Operations Branch (MO) of OSS started black radio operations in the latter half of 1943 in theaters where it operated. In one instance, MO worked with Office of War Information personnel on a station that broadcast to Italy. The Italian station was called “Radio Italo Balbo,” named for the deceased but well-known Italian aviator Italo Balbo, whom rumors said was secretly murdered by Benito Mussolini because he disliked Balbo’s popularity with the Italian public. Radio Italo Balbo claimed to be operated by followers of the deceased aviator, who spread rumors designed to promote conflict between Fascist groups, between Fascists and other Italians, and between Italy and Germany. The station was overseen by Oliver H. P. Garrett, a Hollywood screenwriter who joined the OWI shortly after having co-written Underground, the U.S. film about the German Freedom Station." The station began broadcasting prior to the invasion of Italy and shut down in September 1943 after the invasion began. Garrett and members of MO learned the station had generated considerable listenership.

Following Radio Italo Balbo, MO started an anti-Axis station that broadcast to the Balkans from a transmitter in Turkey. MO also started developing plans for operating clandestine radio stations in Burma, which was codenamed the "Hump Plan." One such station, codenamed Charlie, was beamed to Canton, China, from which it claimed to originate. The station claimed to be operated by an underground, anti-Japanese resistance group operated by a fictitious Liang Ting Han. The station broadcast in Cantonese by Li Chi-wei, who worked with OSS.

By April 1944, operations of the UK’s PWE increased to the point where it had insufficient personnel to produce enough quality entertainment programs for Soldatensender Calais, which was believed to be necessary to attract and maintain a sizeable German audience. Because OSS had a number of individuals who had worked in radio during peacetime, MO agreed to produce radio programs for an operation codenamed “Project Muzac.” The U.S. offices of OSS recruited writers, a band, and well-known performers such as Marlene Dietrich and Bing Crosby to record songs for Muzac. MO operated out of an office above Abercrombie and Fisk in New York City and used the offices of the J. Walter Thompson advertising agency to write and recorded black lyrics for 312 German and US songs, as well as specially written songs with anti-Nazi lyrics. A typical Soldatensener Calais broadcast included 12 hours of news from the fronts, bomb damage reports, domestic German news, political commentaries, and entertainment programs.

The Reichsministerium für Volksaufklärung und Propaganda (Reich Ministry of Public Enlightenment and Propaganda) issued repeated warnings to civilians and soldiers not to listen to the Soldatensender – that it was Allied propaganda. In particular, German propaganda minister Joseph Goebbels recognised the station’s ability to undermine morale. The Soldatensender not only provided quality entertainment, but also attempted to tactically undermine Nazi unity. For example, after the July 20,1944 attempt on Adolf Hitler’s life, it broadcast the names of hundreds of Germans allegedly involved in the plot, seeking to implicate the guilty and the innocent to cause the Nazi leadership to turn on their supporters. Post-war reports indicate that the Gestapo took Soldatensender reports seriously, and Lieutenant General Omar Bradley’s US 12th Army Group claimed that the station was especially popular, with a fair percentage Germans taken prisoner in the summer of 1944 reporting they had listened to the station. Post-war interrogations revealed that German civilians also regularly followed the Soldatensender.

Related to the Soldatensender broadcasts about the attempted assassination of Hitler was “Operation Joker,” which was conducted in 1944. MO resurrected General Ludwig Beck, former chief-of-staff of the German army, who was executed after the failed July 20th plot against Hitler but whose death was never officially acknowledged by Germany. Broadcasting from England, the “Joker” station used a broadcaster of German origin whose voice was like that of Beck. This “Beck” claimed that Nazi incompetence and had effectively lost the war and called for Germans to revolt and overthrow the Nazi regime and then surrender, saving Germany from complete destruction. Rumors planted in advance of the broadcasts reinforced the idea that Beck was still alive. The first broadcast, made in October 1944, was picked up in Sweden and reported in other neutral nations. The Nazis, caught completely off guard, jammed the “Joker” broadcasts every night for three weeks. The broadcasts produced consternation within German leadership, but also within the PWE and OSS because Nazi jamming not only prevented the return of the 'Joker' broadcasts but also interfered with the transmission of other Allied propaganda programming.

Radio 1212 was another black radio station operated by MO and PWB/12th AG that broadcast at night from the transmitter of Radio Luxemburg. The station was codenamed “Operation Annie” and broadcast to the Rhineland between December 1944 and April 25, 1945.

The capture of the Radio Luxembourg transmitter in September 1944 gave MO access to the most powerful radio transmitter on the continent. The radio had been used by the German occupiers up to the time that Germany withdrew from Luxemburg. The station was left intact when the Germans hastily withdrew, except for its tubes, which were destroyed. Because additional tubes had been hidden and were available, the station returned to the air quickly. William Harlan Hale of OWI was appointed head of the station, which broadcast the “Voice of SHAEF,” the official (white) station of the Supreme Headquarters Allied Expeditionary Force during daytime hours.

MO received approval in early December 1944 to run a black campaign from Radio Luxembourg. The station operated at night when the Voice of SHAEF was off-the-air. Radio 1212 ran nightly from midnight to 6:30 am on 1212 meters, and purported to come from an anti-Nazi group in the Rhineland area. Its news and information were addressed primarily to Rhinelanders, who were in the immediate path of the Allied advance. The programming comprised Rhenish music, news and emotional appeals using speakers with Rhenish accents. Its chief announcer was MO’s Benno Frank, who spoke to German troops and civilians alike, talking about military events and air raids, and carried extracts from Oberkommando der Wehrmacht communiqués, making it appear to be a legitimate German station. Instructions and addresses were also given to fictitious underground groups, as too was information on how well 'liberated' Germans were faring under the benevolent nature of their Allied occupation, making the Allied occupation seem more palatable to war-weary Germans. "Annie" possessed a subtle and clearly subversive mission: although planned and executed as a 'black' operation, Radio 1212 was not at first wholly subversive, for it concentrated on the provision of truthful, factual information as a means of building trust among listeners. Once the desired level of trust had been established, and after the Allied breakthrough in the Mosel river area, Radio 1212 began to insert false reports, evacuation and mobilisation orders, rumors and highly exaggerated information in the hope of causing chaos. After the Allies had breached the German defences along the Rhine river, Radio 1212 invented a resistance movement within Germany and encouraged everyone to join it.

Reports from prisoners of war and civilians suggested that the audience for 'Annie' was large for the 125 nights that it broadcast. Even members of the Nazi party reportedly listened to Radio 1212. One Swedish newspaper stated that the resistance organization responsible for Radio 1212 had branches in all towns and villages in the areas to the west of the lines between Hamburg and Bremen and between Braunschweig and Munich, and was organised to prevent any implementation of scorched-earth policies by the Nazis. Other sources also maintained that Radio 1212 was a legitimate station. In overall terms, Nazi reactions to Radio 1212 indicated that the undertaking was among the most successful campaigns of its type in the course of the war.

After German troops withdrew from Paris, MO received authorization to establish a black radio station at Villebon, near Paris, named Volksender Drei. MO intended to capitalize on civilian fears of the Nazi’s scorched-earth policies as they withdrew from areas as Allied troops advanced, as well as German troops’ fears that they were being forced to fight to the last man. Volksender Drei broadcast in German between 10 and 11pm, claiming to be operated by the commander of a garrison in a town in the path of the Allied advance who revolted and opposed the Nazi’s policies of destruction. The station called for troops to revolt rather than fight and die. Among OSS personnel working on the station was actor Stefan Schnabel, radio and film director Abraham Polonsky, and actress Erika Mann, daughter of novelist Thomas Mann.

According to Taylor, the broadcasts were quite successful, and even fooled Allies. The station made headlines in French newspapers, and “two thousand German POW's who listened to the program believed it ‘meant the end of Germany.’” It also fooled U.S. 12th Army Group radio operators, who picked up the broadcasts and considered them so important that high ranking U.S. Army officers, including General Omar Bradley, were aroused from bed to hear about it. Morover, the Germans repeatedly tried to jam the program, suggesting that they also thought the station effective.

General Douglas McArthur did not permit OSS to operate in the South West Pacific Area, where he was commander, because he was wary of independent actors and had his own intelligence unit called the Central Bureau. OSS did, however, operate in the North Pacific, where it established a radio monitoring facility, and the Central Pacific, where it operated a clandestine radio station that broadcast to Japan.

The station was put on the air after Admiral Chester W. Nimitz, who was commander-in-chief of the U.S. Pacific Fleet and Pacific Ocean Areas, allowed OSS-MO to establish a station that would broadcast to Japan. The director of the proposed station was John V. Zuckerman, who would later become a management professor at the University of Houston. The station was staffed by Japanese-Americans who were interned at the start of the war. The facilities of the clandestine station were located first on Catalina Island, off the California coast, and then in San Francisco, where Japanese-Americans could travel unnoticed and without harassment because of the city’s large Chinese population. Working with Zuckerman was Bruce Rogers, a Japanese-speaking radio technician, and Bogart Carlaw, a radio producer and copywriter. The assistant director of the station was Joe Koide, a Japanese-American, who has since been believed to be a triple agent – working for the U.S., the U.S.S.R. and Japan.

Thirteen Japanese-Americans worked at the recording facility in San Francisco. Although the Japanese-Americans spoke Japanese, they were not aware of modern colloquialisms, and could by mistake misuse phrases, giving away the station’s foreign origins. To insure this did not happen, a Japanese prisoner-of-war captured at Attu was enlisted to comment on the scripts, which were written under the direction of Carlaw and other station leaders. The scripts were rewritten and translated into Japanese by the Japanese-Americans. Koide and Rogers gave the scripts the final proof reading. Finally, a team of Japan experts including State Department, OWI and military leaders reviewed the scripts. One of the announcers on the station was artist Mitsu Yashima, who fled Japan and had taken up residence in New York. The station was called “Voice of the People,” and claimed to originate from Japanese farmers, union members and intellectuals, who opposed continuing the war.

Because Nimitz banned Japanese-Americans from Saipan, where the transmitter of the station was located, the programs were recorded in San Francisco and sent by airpouch to Saipan. Zuckerman and Alfred Leach, an OSS technician who had worked on Volksender Drei, went to Saipan to prepare the transmitter for the broadcasts. The station inaugurated broadcasts on April 23, 1946 on 870 kHz, the frequency used by Osaka Radio. Each broadcast consisted of 30 minute recordings that were recorded in San Francisco.

== Other World War II Era Stations ==
Great Britain’s PWB and the United States’s OSS were not the only operators of clandestine stations during World War II. Back radio operations were widespread, operated by Germany, the Soviet Union and other countries. Before the outbreak of the war, Germany created a black propaganda division called the Büro Concordia that was similar to the PWB and OSS-MO. The Büro was a secret department within the Reich Ministry of Public Enlightenment and Propaganda. The Büro’s black radio stations, which operated throughout the war, were designed to undermine resistance and support for enemy governments. The Nazis hoped that the dissatisfaction would spur unrest.

Prior to Germany’s attack on France, it operated two clandestine stations – Radio Humanité i Voix de la Paix - that broadcast to France. The stations were designed to undermine French resistance. Both stations signed on during December 1939. "Radio Humanité" presented itself as a Communist mobile station that called on listeners to avoid military service, to protest against war with Germany, and to demand workers' rights, particularly for shortening working hours and refusing overtime work in French arms factories. (The station was believable because the French Communist party, under the direction of the Comintern, adopted a pacifistic stance after the signing of the Molotov–Ribbentrop Pact.)

Voix de la Paix claimed to be based "somewhere in France" and presented itself as a voice for loyal French citizen. The station claimed to speak for a large underground organization that desired peace and was concerned about the future of France. In its broadcasts, the station spread fears about the shortcomings of the French military and industry, claiming a war with Germany lead to disaster. By inciting fear, spreading and embellishing facts, the station aimed to undermine France’s will to resist.

After the outbreak of WWII, Germany started several black stations targeting Great Britain. One was a station called the Worker’s Challenge, which claimed to be an indigenous British socialist station that encouraged workers to strike against their capitalist bosses. Another station, called Radio Caledonia, targeted Scottish nationalists; another targeted Christian pacificists. That station was called Christian Peace Movement radio.

The Buro Concordia also targeted the United States and the Soviet Union with black radio broadcasts. A German station broadcasting to the United States on shortwave was named ‘Radio Debunk,” which claimed to be based in mid-America, where the station’s operator, Herbert John Burgman, was born. Burgman, using the pseudonym Joe Scanlon when on-air, was originally from Minnesota. He married a German national with whom he lived in Germany, where he became a committed Nazi sympathizer. Radio Debunk claimed that the war in Europe was caused by Jews and Communists, who virtually ran the Roosevelt administration. After the war, Burgman was arrested by U.S. soldiers, and tried and convicted of treason.

Using its only transmitter in the East, the Bureau Concordia operated a black radio station directed at the Soviet Union called Lenin's Old Guard that claimed to be operated by dedicated Communists aligned with the anti-Stalinist opposition, most of whom were eliminated by Stalin during the 1930s purges. The station claimed to be based in the U.S.S.R. rather than in Germany.

Lastly, the Nazis operated a domestic clandestine station in the waning days of World War II when U.S. and British troops were marching East and Soviet troops were marching west. The station called on pro-Nazi brigades and loyal Germans to engage in a guerrilla war against Allied troops. The station was called Werwolf Radio and broadcast from Nauen near Berlin, beginning on 1 April 1945. Broadcasts began with the sound of a wolf howling, and a song featuring the lyrics, "My werewolf teeth bite the enemy / And then he's done and then he's gone." The station claimed that "In this hour of the greatest danger to the life of the German nation...Every Bolshevist, Briton and American who stands on German soil is an outlaw and our rightful prey." The station stated that the Nazi Party was ordering every German to "stand his ground and do or die against the Allied occupiers." Overall, the station had little impact, because war-weary Germans were not in a position to fight against the Allies' occupying tanks.

The Soviet Union avoided antagonizing the Axis powers after signing the Molotov-Ribbentrop Pact in 1939, so it refrained from operating or sponsoring clandestine stations broadcasting to Europe until after the German invasion of June 22, 1941. However, the Soviet Union was involved in clandestine broadcasting elsewhere. In 1939, Chinese Communist leader Zhou Enlai visited Moscow, where he requested leaders of the Comintern to provide his rebel army with a radio transmitter to broadcast to rebel-held, and other parts of, China. A transmitter was given to the rebels, who clandestinely brought it to China. In addition to the transmitter, the Soviet Union provided technical support to help the Yan’an Xinhua Radio Station begin operating. The station continued to broadcast during the war against Japan and the subsequent civil war; after the victory of Mao’s army, the station moved from the underground to become China National Radio. The station likely represents the first guerrilla-operated clandestine transmitter operating from within the country to which it broadcast.

With European Communist leaders from numerous European countries already in exile in Moscow, the U.S.S.R. was in a position to restart previously operating clandestine stations, as well as starting new ones, after Germany invaded the U.S.S.R. About a month after the German attack, the Soviets were putting clandestine stations on the air. After the defeat of the Spanish Republic, Spanish Communist leaders moved to Moscow and were ready to start Radio España Independiente, which signed on on July 22, 1941. The station operated under the auspices of the Communist International or Comintern, as did other Communist clandestine stations, until the Comintern was dissolved in 1943. Italian Communist leader Palmiro Togliatti was head of the clandestine radio operations of the Comintern. Shortly after Radio Espana Independiente signed-on, Radio Milano-Libertà, which had broadcast from Spain to Italy until the fall of the republic, reappeared. On September 10, 1941, the German Freedom Station, now called German People's Radio signed on, beaming clandestine broadcasts to Germany.

The Soviet Union also sponsored broadcasts of Radio Free Yugoslavia, which broadcast in support of Marshall Tito's partisans, as well as broadcasts to occupied countries via Radio Moscow. These broadcasts originated from Soviet-backed anti-Nazi groups, such as the Union of Polish Patriots, which operated Radio Kosciuszko, and the Hungarian Social Democratic Party, which operated Kossuth Radio. The Polish broadcasts branded Gen. Władysław Sikorski and Stanisław Mikołajczyk, leaders of the Polish government-in-exile as fascists, thus rationalizing the Soviet invasion of Poland in 1939. After the war, the Hungarian Social Democratic Party was forced to merge with the Communist Party and thus consolidated Soviet control in the country.

== Cold War Era Stations ==
While the black radio stations of the United States and Great Britain, along with the German stations, were silenced as World War II ended, some of the Soviet-sponsored stations, like Radio Espana Independiente, continued to broadcast. The transmitter of Radio Espana Independiente was moved from Moscow to Ufa in Bashkortostan and then in 1955 to Bucharest, Romania. The station continued to broadcast until 1977, when General Franco died and banned political parties were legalized. The Bucharest-based trasmitter of the station also aired programs of the Portuguese Communist Party over Rádio Portugal Livre beginning in 1962. This clandestine station signed off in 1974 after the Carnation Revolution, which ended the Portuguese dictatorship. Also signing on from transmitters in Prague, Czechoslovakia were Oggi in Italia and Ce Soir en France, which broadcast to Italy and France as stations of the Communist parties of these nations. Oggi in Italia was the successor of Radio Milano-Libertad and was also overseen by Palmiro Togliatti, who was in Italy at the time of the station's appearance.A clandestine station speaking for the Tudeh Party of Iran called Radio Iran Courier appeared in 1957, and another clandestine station broadcasting for the exiled Turkish Communist Party appeared around the same time. Other clandestine stations broadcasting from the Eastern bloc included the Voice of Truth, which broadcast to Greece, and the Voice of the Iraqi People, which broadcast to the Middle East.

The U.S. government sponsored aboveground (or white) and clandestine broadcasts to the Communist bloc after the newly created United States National Security Council (NSC) concluded that the Soviet Union was “conducting an extensive propaganda campaign directed primarily against the United States and … and non-Communist elements in all countries.” The NSC issued NSC-4, a directive telling the Central Intelligence Agency, the successor to the OSS, to “initiate and conduct covert psychological operations designed to counter Soviet and Soviet-inspired activities.” Part of the psychological operations included creating “surrogate radio stations” that would broadcast to countries under Soviet control and yet not be officially connected with the U.S. government.

These surrogate stations included white stations like Radio Free Europe/Radio Liberty, as well as clandestine stations such as Radio Goryanin, which broadcast to Bulgaria and claimed to be the “Voice of Bulgaraian Resistance.” The station said it was operated by the anti-communist guerrilla movement Goryani from mobile transmitters in Bulgaria, but was actually based in Greece. Radio Goryanin first appeared on April 1, 1951 on the 6 MHz band. In 1953, the C.I.A. initiated a second broadcast to Bulgaria named Hristo Botev, inspired by a 19th century Bulgarian revolutionary hero, that broadcast nationalist-communist propaganda. The station apparently called for Bulgaria to follow the Yugoslav path of Josip Broz Tito and develop its own path to socialism, free from Soviet domination.

The U.S. started clandestine stations such as Future of Romania - Voice of National Resistance, the Voice of Free Albania, Our Russia, Radio Free Russia and stations that broadcast to the Ukraine, the Baltic states and other Eastern Bloc countries. The C.I.A. also operated stations targeting governments that it perceived as being leftist, likely to nationalize U.S. businesses, or friendly torward Russia. For example, the C.I.A. started a clandestine station in 1954 called Voice of Liberation that claimed to be operated by a rebel army dedicated to ousting democratically elected Guatemalan president Jacobo Árbenz. The station announced that troops of Carlos Castillo Armas, a military leader who was exiled in Honduras after an attempted coup against a democratically elected Guatemalan government in 1949, were marching on the capitol. The Guatemalan army was paralyzed, believing the rebel army was larger than it actually was and fearful that Armas's rebellion was a prelude to a U.S. invasion, and refused to defend the government. The C.I.A. operated other, similar stations, such as Radio Swan, which broadcast to Cuba around the time of the Bay of Pigs invasion. Radio Swan was the C.I.A.'s most sophisticated black radio operation during the Cold War era.

As the Cold War continued, both the US and U.S.S.R. continued operating or sponsoring clandestine stations opposing each other, although the number of stations they operated in the 1970s decreased, as the countries' attentions were focused in other areas. For example, both the US and U.S.S.R. operated clandestine stations broadcasting to Iran as protests there escalated during the Iranian Revolution with the Islamists eventually taking power under the leadership of Ayatollah Ruhollah Khomeini. Both countries attempted to influence events there using clandestine stations. The U.S.-operated an anti-Islamist radio station called the Free Voice of Iran that broadcast from Egypt, calling the Ayatollah a "racist and fascist." The Soviet-sponsored station was called the National Voice of Iran and broadcast from a transmitter in Baku, claiming that the shah-U.S. relationship has made Iran economically dependent on the United States.
