= Harold Stevens =

Harold Stevens may refer to:

- Harold A. Stevens (1907–1990), American lawyer and judge
- Harold Stevens (broadcaster) (1883–1961), British colonel and BBC broadcaster
- Harold Stevens (civil servant) (1892–1969), Indian Civil Service officer
