= Hristo Botev Monument, Botevgrad =

Coordinates: 42°54′29″N 23°47′30″E

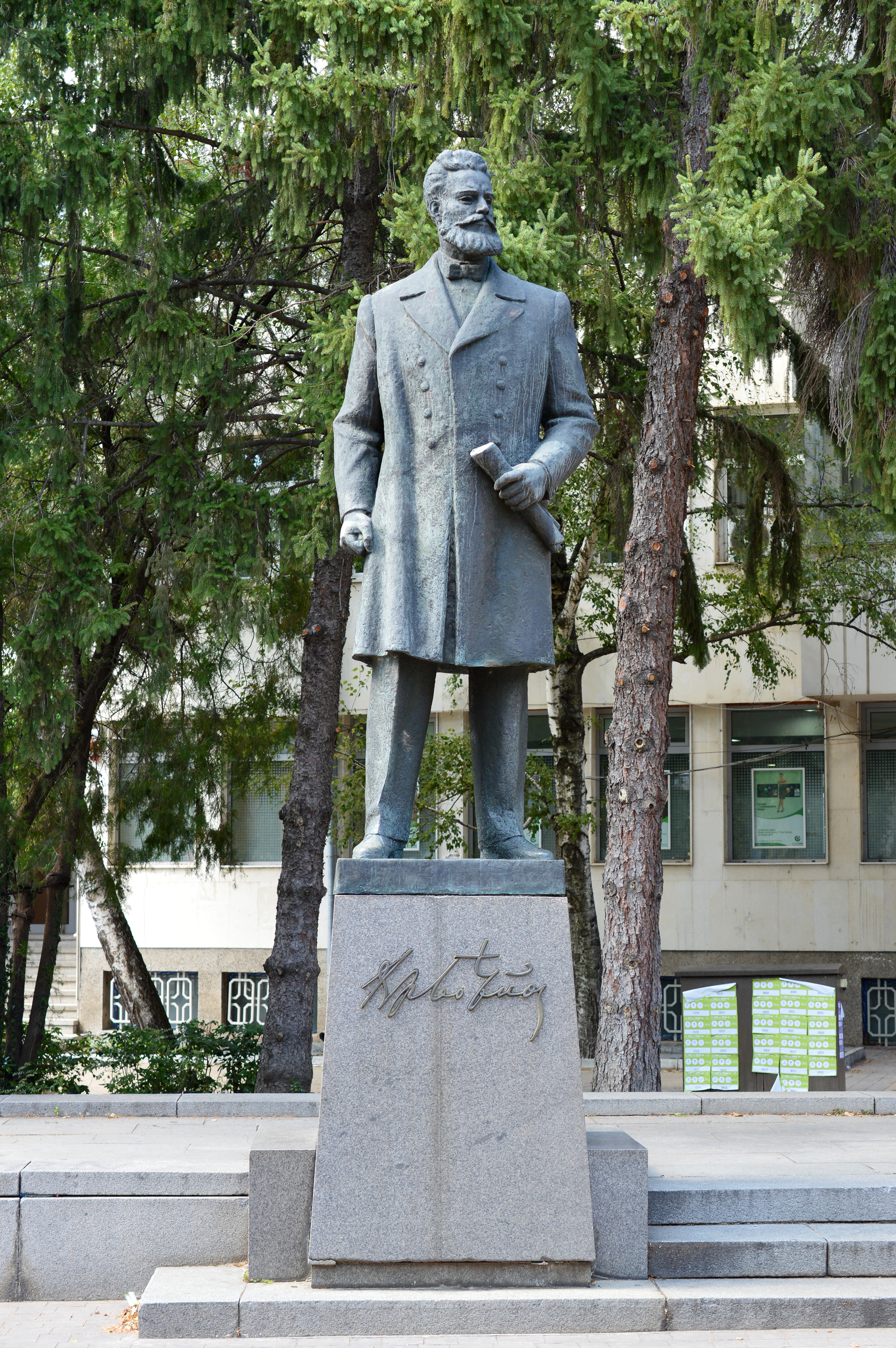
Monument to Hristo Botev

The Monument to Hristo Botev (Bulgarian: Паметник на Христо Ботев) is one of the landmarks of the town of Botevgrad, Bulgaria. It is located in the central square of the town, next to the Town Hall. It is dedicated to the renowned Bulgarian revolutionary and poet Hristo Botev (1848–1876).

The idea to build the monument was proposed by the Mayor Ivan Nikolchovski in the late 1950s and was supported by the Town Council. The municipal authorities chose the project of the sculptor Prof. Ivan Mandov. The meeting with him and the public discussion were held in the Town Hall in May 1960. Prof. Mandov presented a gypsum model of the monument, after which the mayor gave the floor to those present for speeches, suggestions and assessments. In the spirit of the time, representatives of the Bulgarian Communist Party, the Fatherland Front, the Trade unions, the cooperative farms, etc., gave speeches. The statements were general, incompetent, some even humorous. There were suggestions that the monument should be installed in Bardceto, Chekanitsa, Zelin, or other locations. The professor listened to the suggestions and assessments and finally stated that with his modest possibilities he could not satisfy the requirements of the representatives of Botevgrad citizenry. The issue of the monument remained open until 1966. Then, on the occasion of the upcoming celebration of the 100th anniversary of the town's charter, the issue appeared again on the agenda. The Botevgrad authorities persuaded Prof. Ivan Mandov to implement his idea with promises not to interfere with "creative" discussions on a local level.

On 9 October 1966, the monument was opened on the occasion of the 100th anniversary of the town. The head of state Todor Zhivkov, a delegation from the twin city of Saransk, guests from the country and the region were present at the opening ceremony. The tape was cut by Todor Zhivkov.

The sculptural figure depicts Hristo Botev in full stature. His left hand holds a book scroll - an expression of his brilliant poetic and publicist work. The figure was cast of bronze in the foundry of the Union of the Bulgarian Painters. The architectural design of the pedestal was the work of arch. Pavel Atanasov. At the foundations of the monument of Hristo Botev lay the copies of the protocols on the acceptance of the project, including the one from May 1960.
