= Hayduti (poem) =

- Poem
- Native name: Хайдути
- Full title: Hayduti. Bashta i sin
- Year: 1866
- Text: by Hristo Botev
- Published: 1871
- Publisher: Word of the Bulgarian Emigrants

"Hayduti" (Bulgarian: Хайдути, romanized: Hayduti, Haiduti), with the subtitle "Bashta i sin" (Bulgarian: Баща и син, lit. 'Father and son'), is an unfinished Bulgarian National Revival poem created by the famous Bulgarian poet and revolutionary Hristo Botev, one of the first literature works made by him.

== History ==
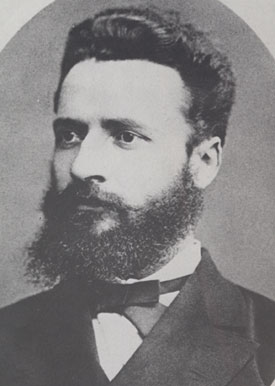
Hristo Botev, the author of Hayduti

Botev began to write the poem in 1866 in the city of Odesa, when he was a student. The poem was unfinished and still is to this day, as he refused to write down his recitation, even though he was being pressured by many people. The recitation included the main character Chavdar being sent to Russia for education purposes by his mother. When he returned to his home, after seeing the Ottoman Turks pestering the Bulgarian paupers, he reproached his mother for sending him to learn, instead of becoming a Haydutin. Only a part of the text was then printed and published to the newspaper Word of the Bulgarian emigrants (Bulgarian: Дума на българските емигранти).

== Plot ==
The partially realised plot of the poem includes only the main introduction, the introduction of the character and a conversation between Chavdar and his mother, due to the fact that it is an unfinished work. The main introduction is written as an address that prompts the "grandfather" to play the kaval, so that the folk singer can begin to sing about the hayduti. The next part is the dialogue between the mother and Chavdar. They have different views, but have connected trust between each other. Chavdar wants to follow the steps of his father, Petko "Strashnika", whilst the mother doesn't want her son to do that. In the end, the mother promises to Chavdar that she would let him go to his father. He is exuberantly happy, but the mother is sorrowful and sobbing and the poem is interrupted by her weeping.
