= Kriva Bara =

Kriva Bara or Kriva bara may refer to:

- Kriva Bara (Bulgarian: Крива Бара) in Bulgaria:
  - Kriva Bara, Montana Province - a village of the Brusartsi Municipality, Montana Province
  - Kriva Bara, Vratsa Province - a village of the Kozloduy Municipality, Vratsa Province
- Kriva Bara (Serbian Cyrillic: Крива Бара) in Bosnia-Herzegovina:
  - Kriva Bara, Bijeljina - a populated place in Bijeljina, Republika Srpska, Bosnia and Herzegovina
