= Kozloduy =

Kozloduy Козлодуй
- Town
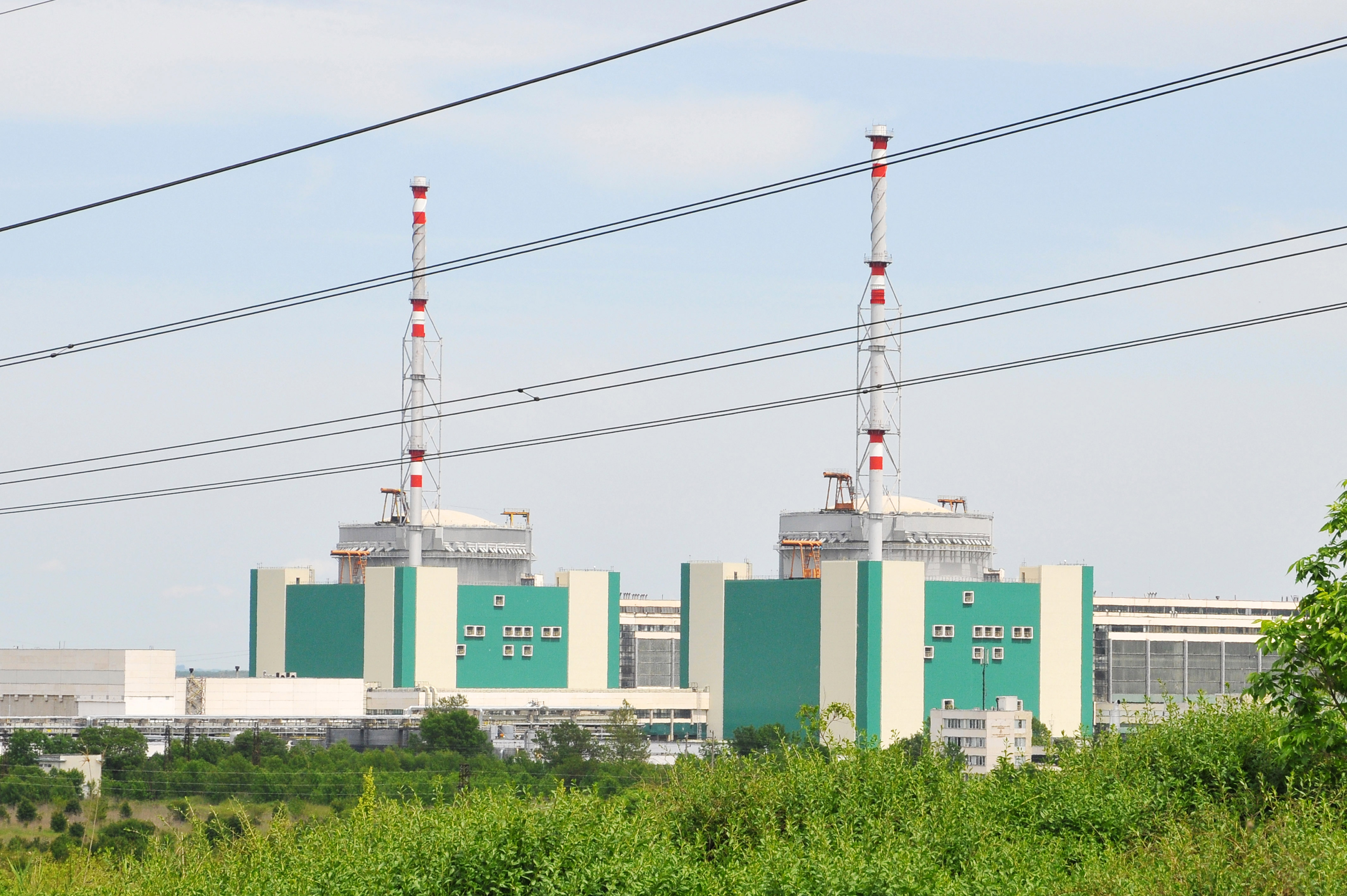

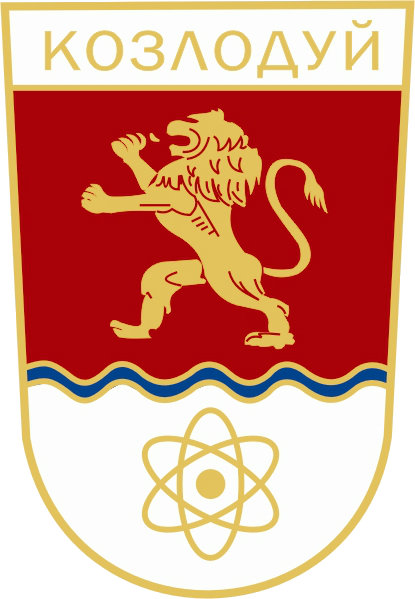
- Coat of arms

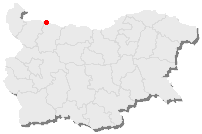
- Location of Kozloduy in Bulgaria
- Coordinates: 43°47′0″N 23°44′0″E
- Country: Bulgaria
- Province (Oblast): Vratsa
- Municipality: Kozloduy Municipality

Government
  - Mayor: Marinela Nikolova

Area
  - Total: 105.307 km^{2} (40.659 sq mi)
- Elevation: 33 m (108 ft)

Population (2021)
  - Total: 11,331
  - Density: 107.60/km^{2} (278.68/sq mi)
- Time zone: UTC+2 (EET)
  - Summer (DST): UTC+3 (EEST)
- Postal Code: 3320

Kozloduy (Bulgarian: Козлодуй pronounced [kozɫoˈduj]) is a town in northwest Bulgaria, located in Vratsa Province, on the Danube River. The city was liberated from Ottoman rule on 23 November 1877 by the Romanian Army under the command of the Imperial Russian Army. Kozloduy is best known for the Kozloduy Nuclear Power Plant, Bulgaria's only (as of January 2018) nuclear power plant, which is located nearby, as well as the second largest Bulgarian Danubian island, Kozloduy Island. The city is also known for the ship Radetzky, the boat in which the poet and revolutionary Hristo Botev and with 200 others crossed the Danube River in a final attempt to gather an army and liberate Bulgaria from the Ottoman Empire.

== History ==
The earliest data show that Kozloduy was populated in the 16th century BC from the burial mounds where traces of a Thracian dwelling centre that existed in the first millennium BC remain.

Later the Roman fort of Regianum (at Magura piatra) was built here on the Danubian Limes frontier system along the Danube. Other forts nearby were Camistrum and Augusta.

In this region are three historic trenches which were later called Lomski, Ostrovski and Kozloduiski where a military garrison of Khan Asparukh was placed.

In the 18th century the settlement was marked as Kotozluk (Our Parts) and Kozludere (from Turkish, "Ace Creek", or "First Shore") and later Kozloduy ("Ace Hold", or "Prime Landing").

On 17 May 1876 Hristo Botev's detachment landed at Kozloduy on the Radetski steamer. On 23 November 1877 the 8th cavalry regiment under Commander Alexandru Perets liberated Kozloduy from the Ottomans. This cavalry was part of the Romanian Forces under the command of the Russian Imperial Army. Construction of Kozloduy actually started with the construction of the first Nuclear Electric Power Station, which was started on 6 April 1970.

== Location ==
The town is situated on the Danube river, which is the European Transport Corridor No.7. It is 80 km from the province center Vratsa and 200 km from the capital Sofia.

== Economics and business ==
The municipality is one of the richest in Vratsa province (after Vratsa Municipality) and has a standard of living above the average for Bulgaria. The town is one of the best places in Bulgaria for entrepreneurship and starting business, as many qualified personnel from other parts of Bulgaria come to Kozloduy due to the Nuclear Power Plant. Kozloduy has a strategic location near transport corridors N.7, N.5, N.8 and N.9. Two large companies, one each in the construction and electronics sectors, are based in the town.

== Notable people ==
- Rumen Trifonov (born 1985), footballer
- Julia Yurevich (born 1989), beauty pageant

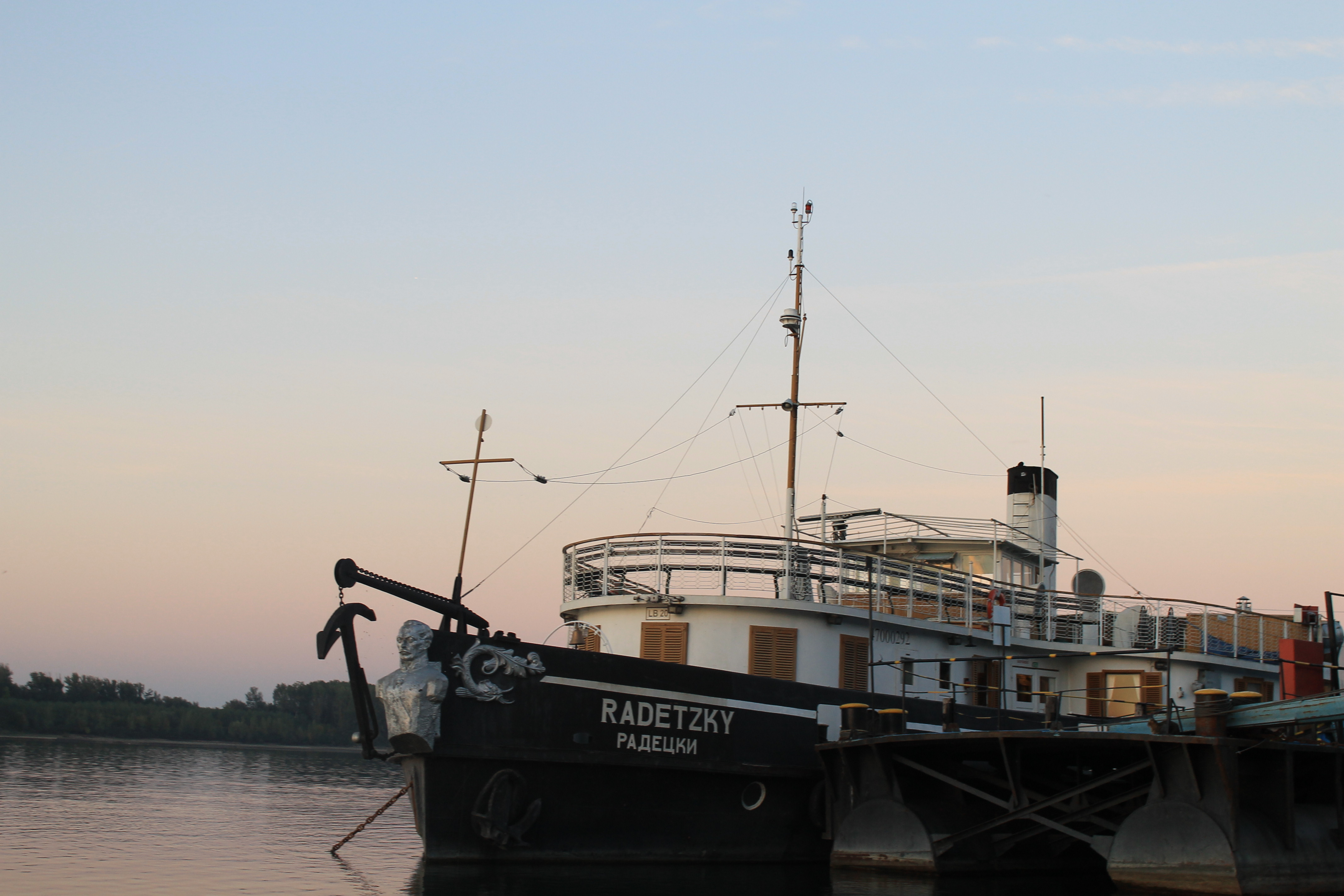
Radetzky boat

== Twin towns - sister cities ==
Kozloduy is twinned with:

- Bechet, Romania
- Bosilegrad, Serbia
- Calafat, Romania
- Whitehaven, England, United Kingdom

== Population ==
Despite a steady population decline, Kozloduy is currently the second most populous city in the Vratsa Province (Vratsa is the first) with some 11,331 residents. Bulgarians make up the largest ethnic group, followed by residents of Turkish, Roma, Russian and Romanian background. Kozloduy has also attracted foreign visitors, as many nuclear power-related seminars are held in the town.

== Honors ==
Kozloduy Cove in Robert Island, South Shetland Islands is named after Kozloduy.
