= Still White Danube Undulates =

Bulgarian patriotic song

"Тих бял Дунав се вълнува" ("Still White Danube Undulates") also known as the Botev March, is a popular Bulgarian patriotic song. The lyrics are based on that of a poem by Ivan Vazov titled Radetzky after the steamship seized by the rebels. The storyline recounts a historically accurate incident from the Bulgarian struggles against Ottoman rule, which has earned the status of modern myth for Bulgarians, to some degree due to this song. On 29 May 1876 Bulgarian revolutionary and poet Hristo Botev at the head of a 205-strong company of rebels seized control of the Austro-Hungarian passenger steamship Radetzky by armed force and used it to cross the Danube from Romania to the Bulgarian territories of the Ottoman Empire in order to join the April Uprising. Dagobert Engländer, Captain of the Radetzky, later recounted that "he had rarely met a man so impressive or energetic as Botev". The melody was composed by vocalist Ivan Karadzhov, according to his biography. In some performances of the song, the fourth verse is omitted. (Note: Notice how at the different timestamps, the lyrics performed are not the same. Source 6 skips the fourth verse but source 5 does not.)

Still White Danube Undulates
A variant of the melody with a shorter singing part and long instrumental.

== Text ==
Bulgarian original

Тих бял Дунав се вълнува

Тих бял Дунав се вълнува,
весело шуми
(и "Радецки" гордо плува
над златни вълни) x2

но кога се там съзирва козлодуйски бряг,
(в парахода рог изсвирва,
развя се байряк.) x2

Млади български юнаци
явяват се там,
(на чела им левски знаци,
в очите им плам.) x2

Горд отпреде им застана
младият им вожд -
па си дума капитану
с гол в ръката нож:

- Аз съм български войвода
момци ми са тез.
(Ний летиме за свобода,
кръв да лейме днес.) x2

Ний летиме на България
помощ да дадем
(и от тежка тирания
да я отървем.) x2

Transliteration

Tih bjal Dunav se vǎlnuva

Tih bjal Dunav se vǎlnuva,
veselo šumi
(i Radetzki gordo pluva
nad zlatni vǎlni) x2

No koga se tam sǎzirva kozlodujski brjag,
(v parahoda rog izsvirva,
razvja se bajrak.) x2

Mladi bǎlgarski junaci
javjavat se tam
(na čela im levski znaci
v očite im plam) x2

Gord otprede im zastana
mladijat im vožd
pa si duma kapitanu
s gol v rakata nož:

-Az sǎm Bǎlgarski vojvoda
momci mi sa tez
(nij letime za svoboda
krǎv da lejme dnes.) x2

Nij letime za Bǎlgaria
pomošt da dadem
(i ot težka tiranija
da ja otǎrvem) x2

English translation

Tranquil White Danube Trembles

Tranquil, white Danube trembles,
jolly drubbing,
(And Radetzky proudly sails,
Upon resplendent waves.) x2

Withal glittering Kozloduy shore
(A horn apprises the Steamer,
A flag is thus unfurled.) x2

Dear, young Bulgarian Heroes
Emerge thither thy,
(On their foreheads lion marks,
and in their eyes ardour.) x2

Proudly there erect before them,
Their leader young,
And thus spoke he to the captain
Holding knife bare.

‘I am a Bulgarian voivod,
And these are all my men.
(We fight now for liberation,
blood to spill today.) x2

We are fighting for Bulgaria,
Proudly devote our succour,
(And from tyranny oppressive
extricate her today.') x2
