= Kozloduy Municipality =

Coordinates: 43.783°N 23.733°E

Kozloduy Municipality Община Козлодуй
- Municipality
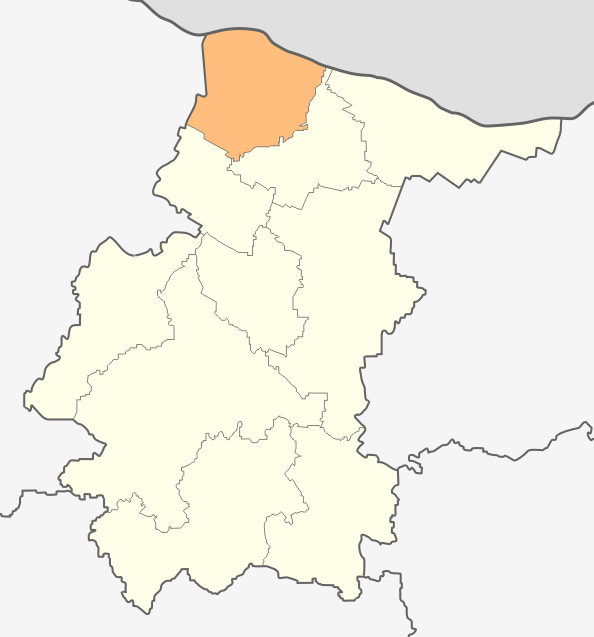
- Country: Bulgaria
- Province: Vratsa Province
- Seat: Kozloduy

Kozloduy Municipality is a municipality in Vratsa Province, Bulgaria.

== Demography ==
The municipality consists of 5 settlements with a total population of 21,180 inhabitants (February 1, 2011). The town and 4 villages - Butan, Harlets, Glozhene and Kriva Bara.

Populated place	Population census (February 2011)	Area (km^{2})
Kozloduy	13058	105,307
Butan	2918	64,454
Glozhene	2748	51,89
Kriva Bara	397	15,542
Harlets	2059	47,681
Общо за общината:	21180	284,874
The settlements with a mayor have a green background, and those without a mayor's office have a yellow one.

=== Religion ===
According to the latest Bulgarian census of 2011, the religious composition, among those who answered the optional question on religious identification, was the following:

Religious composition of Kozloduy Municipality
Orthodox Christianity	50.8%
Catholicism	0.6%
Protestantism	0.4%
Islam	0.2%
No religion	5.7%
Prefer not to answer, others and indefinable	9.8%
