= Okolchitsa =

Bulgarian mountain

- Околчица
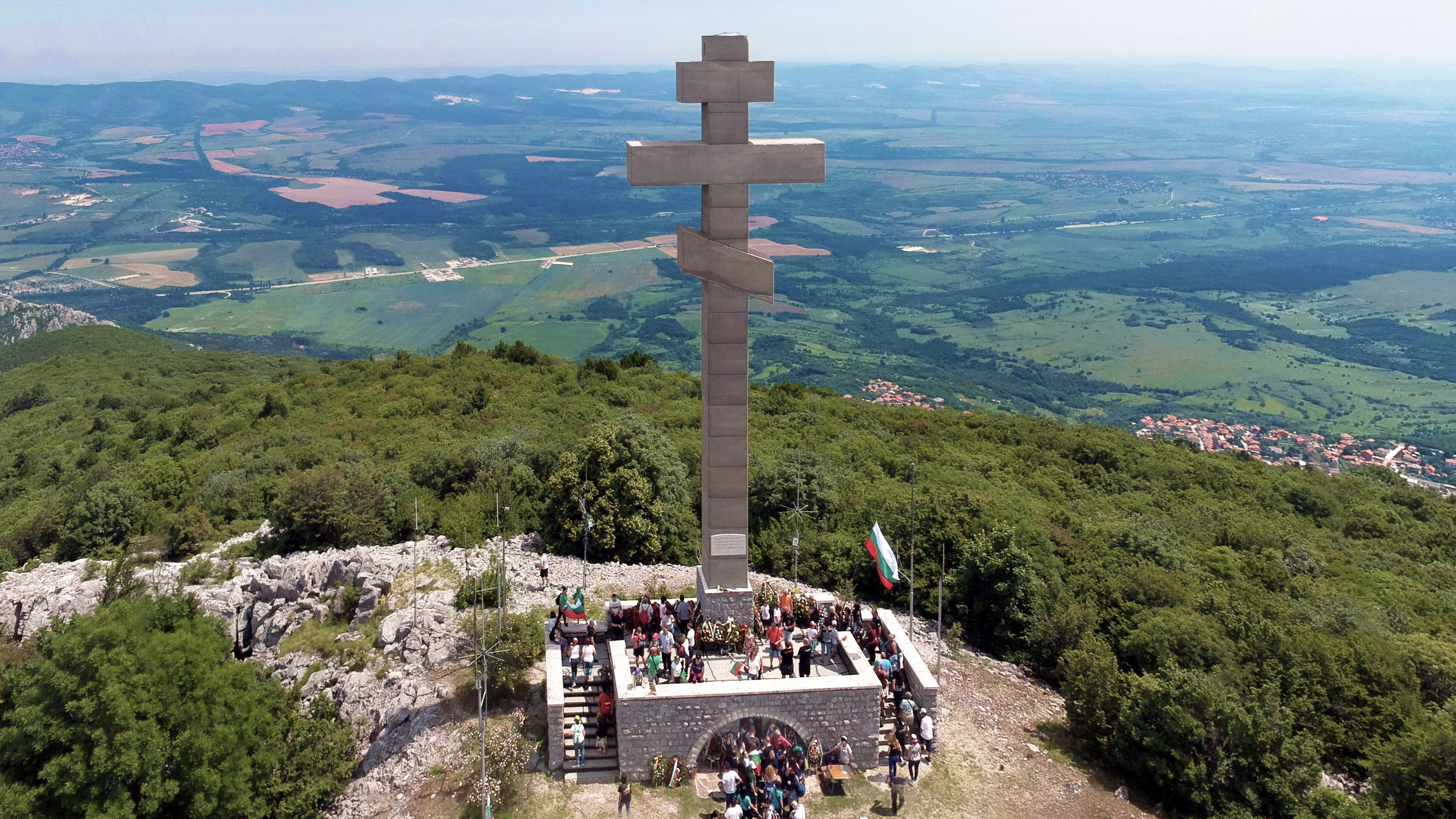

Highest point
- Elevation: 1,048 m (3,438 ft)
- Coordinates: 43°09′04″N 23°35′02″E

Geography
- Location within Bulgaria

Okolchitsa (Bulgarian: Околчица) is a Bulgarian mountain, the highest peak in the Vratsa mountains in the west part of the Balkan Mountains. On the peak on June 2, 1876, the last battle of Hristo Botev's army took place.

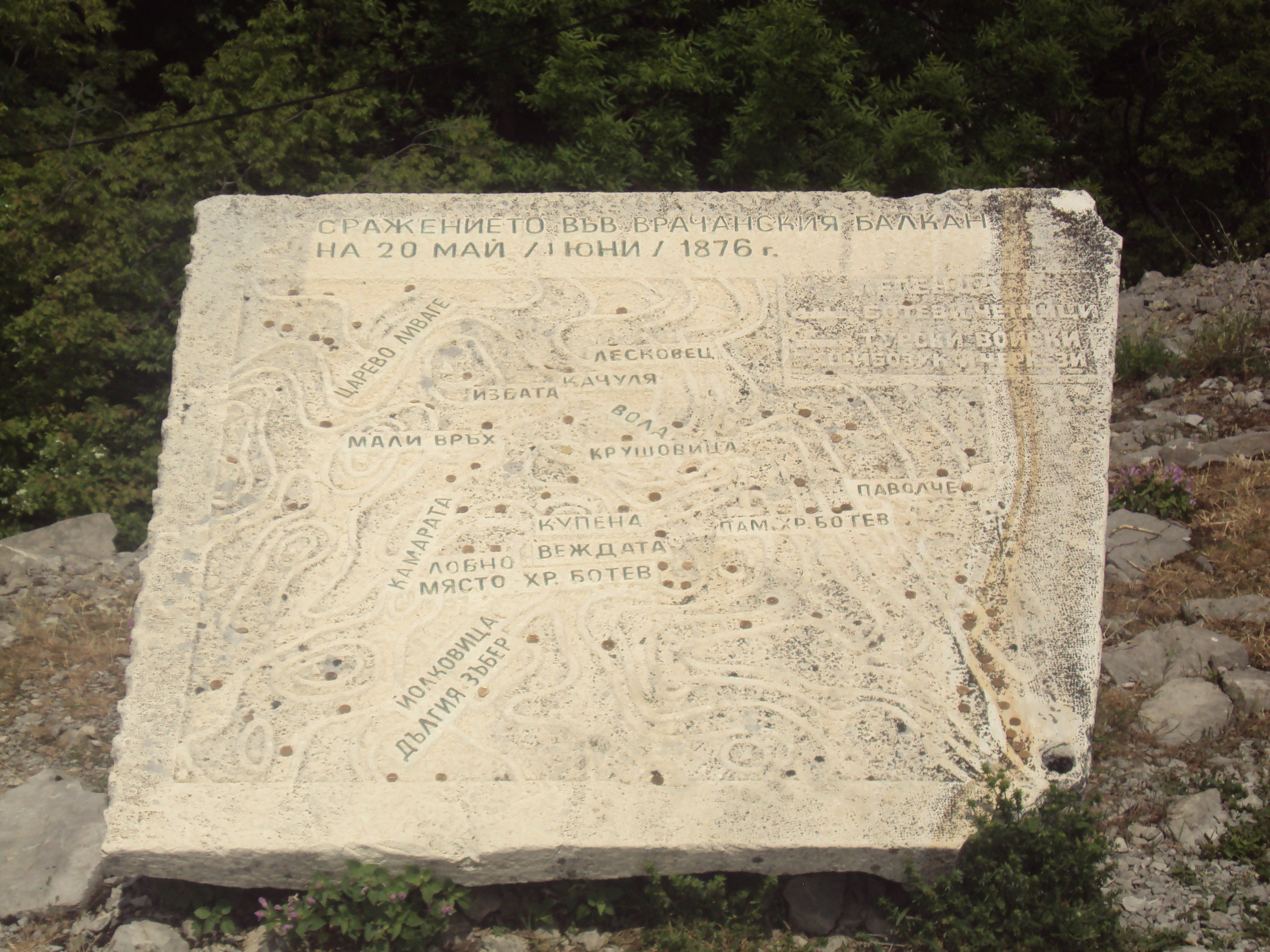
Map of the battle on Okolchitsa

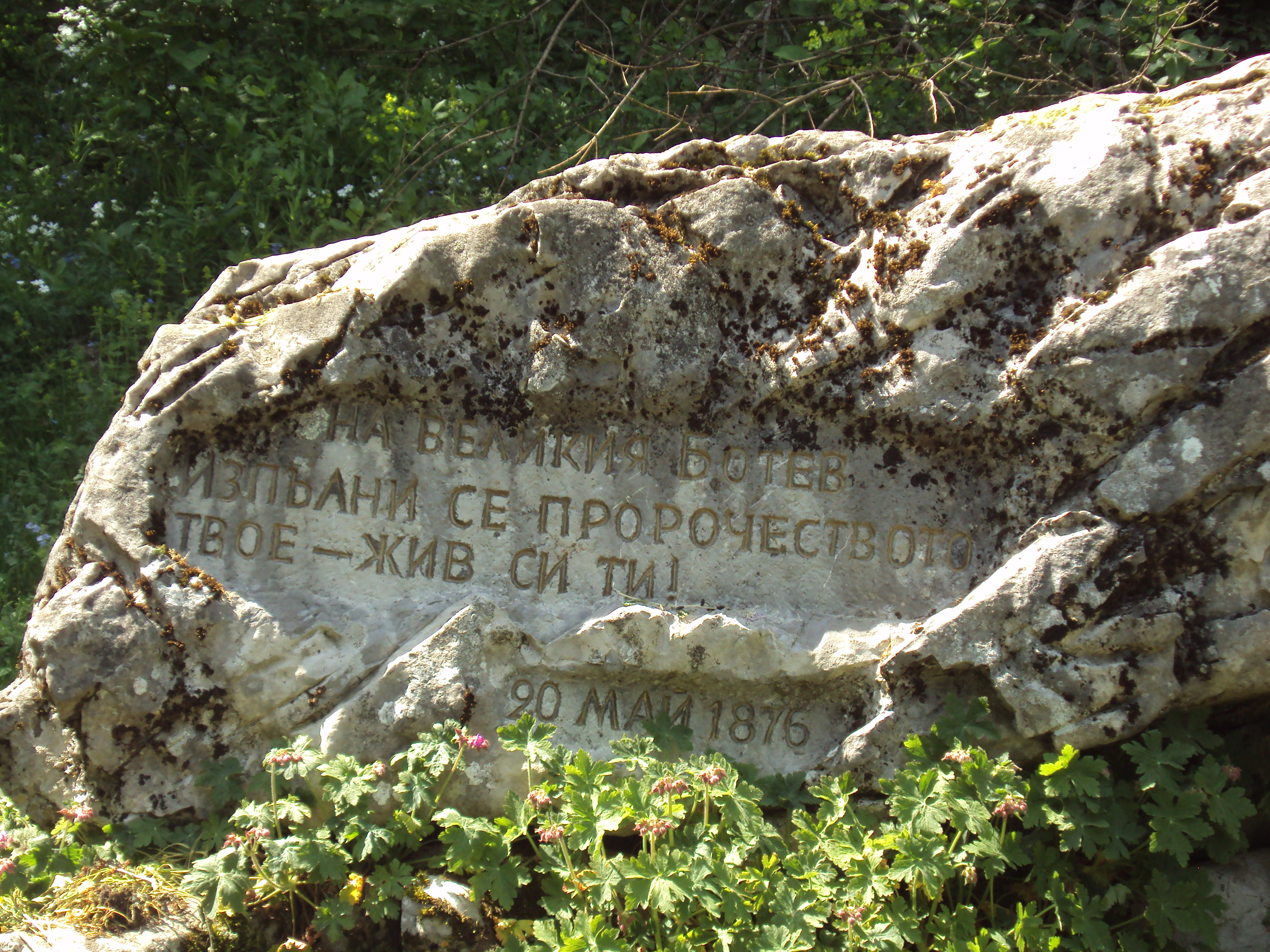
Okolchitza monument

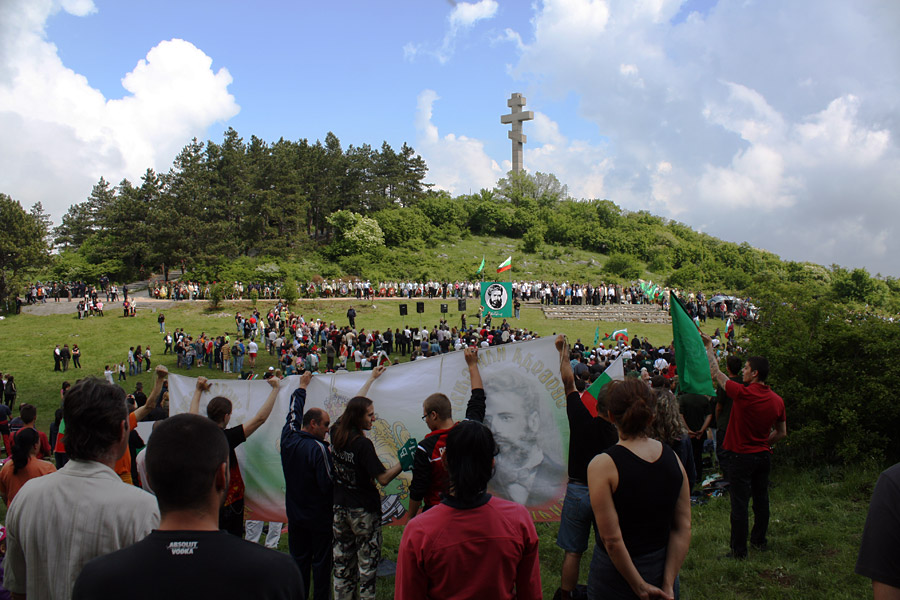
Celebration from the battle
