= Radio Londra =

Italian radio broadcasts of the BBC (1938–1981)

- London; England
- Broadcast area: Italy
- Frequencies: Constantly changing, broadcasting on mediumwave, longwave and shortwave

Programming
- Language: Italian
- Format: Propaganda

History
- First air date: 27 September 1938
- Last air date: 31 December 1981

Radio London (in Italian: Radio Londra) was the name used in Italy for the radio broadcasts of the British Broadcasting Corporation (BBC), starting from 27 September 1938, aimed at the populations of German-dominated continental Europe. The idea may have come from the Italians themselves, as the Arabic-language broadcasts received from Radio Bari in southern Italy were very popular in the Middle East and North Africa, where British and French influence was predominant and where they soon acquired an attentive and interested audience in the local upper middle class.

The BBC's Italian-language broadcasts began with the Munich crisis. With the outbreak of hostilities in 1939, Radio London's broadcasts increased, reaching 4.15 hours in 1943. The success of Radio London's broadcasts was because the British War Office, instead of managing their propaganda broadcasts directly, had entrusted them to a self-governing body, the BBC, which was already well known for its independent journalistic style, with news kept separate from comments.

Radio London's editorial staff were known for their timely reporting in transmitting information around the world, with a direct and pragmatic, British style. The BBC Italian Service was marked by the charismatic personality of Harold Stevens - known in Italy as Colonnello Buonasera (in English Colonel Good Evening) - a British military officer who had lived in Rome and who, through his calm comments, very different from Fascist rhetoric, were viewed as an alternative to Fascist rhetoric.

"Candidus" (the pseudonym of John Marus) was another charismatic figure of Radio London, who, with his relentless dialectical skills, contrasted the attempts of Nazi-Fascist propaganda to distort the reality and seriousness of the situation. Radio London's role in the war also became crucial in sending special messages, drafted by the Allied High Command, for Italian resistance groups. Radio London's broadcasts were opened by the first notes of Beethoven's 5th Symphony (probably because they represented the letter "V" in Morse code, which evoked the idea of "V" for "Victory", also strongly associated with the British Prime Minister Winston Churchill). The BBC continued its broadcasts in Italian with a nightly programme called L'Ora di Londra (London's Hour) until 31 December 1981, when it was cut, despite the protests of many listeners. At least one hundred thousand Italians had apparently retained the habit of listening to the BBC until then.

== See also ==
- Radio Londres (to France)
- Radio Milano-Libertà, the Soviet equivalent during WWII

== Bibliography ==
- Maura Piccialuti Caprioli - Radio Londra 1939-1945. Inventario delle trasmissioni per l'Italia
