= Radetzky (steamship) =

Austro-Hungarian passenger steamship

Coordinates: 43°47′55″N 23°40′41″E

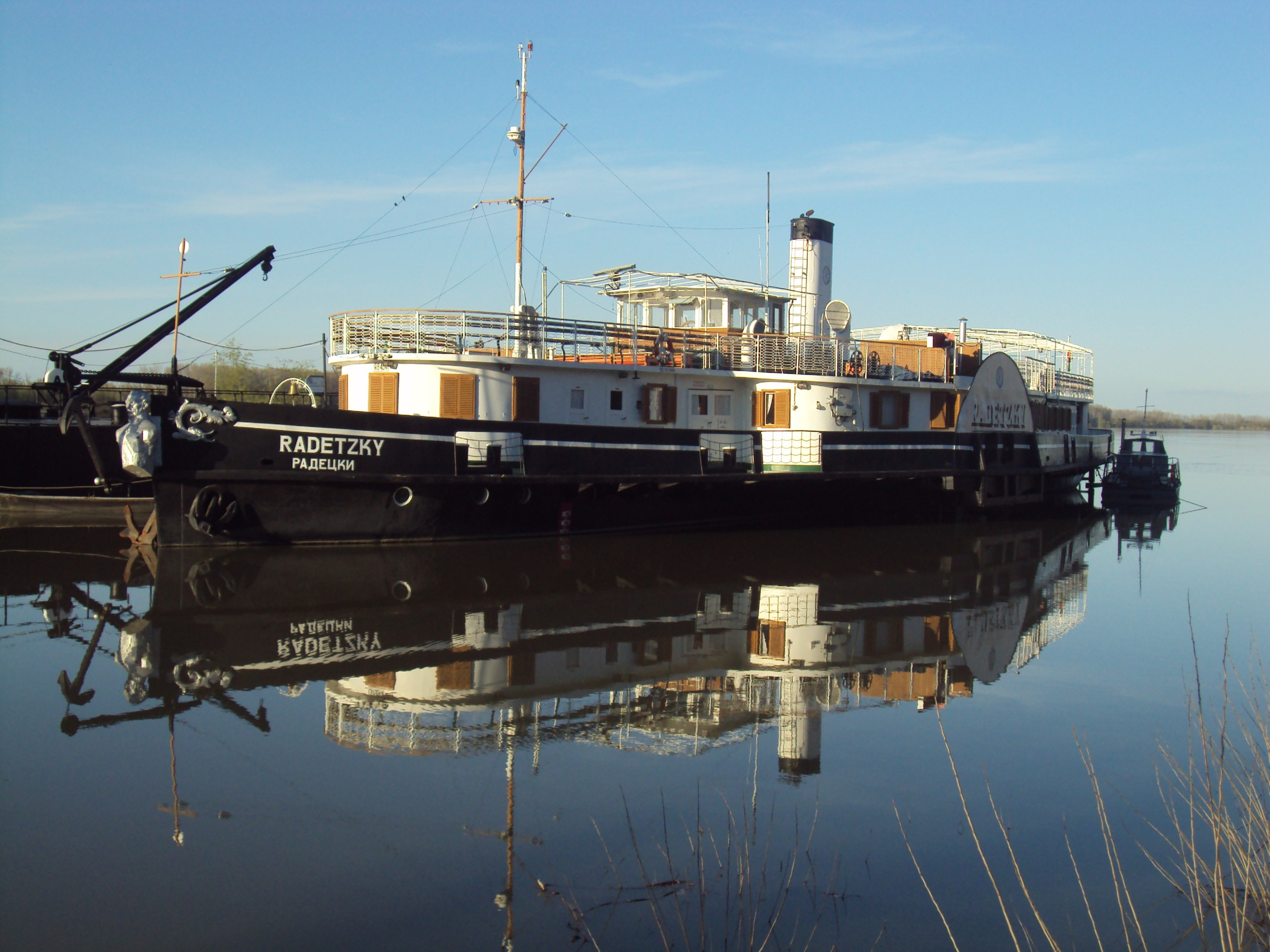
- The reconstructed Radetzky in the Danube at Kozloduy

History

Austria-Hungary
- Builder: Austrian Empire
- Commissioned: 1851
- Decommissioned: 1918
- Status: Museum ship at Kozloduy, Bulgaria

General characteristics
- Length: 57.40 m

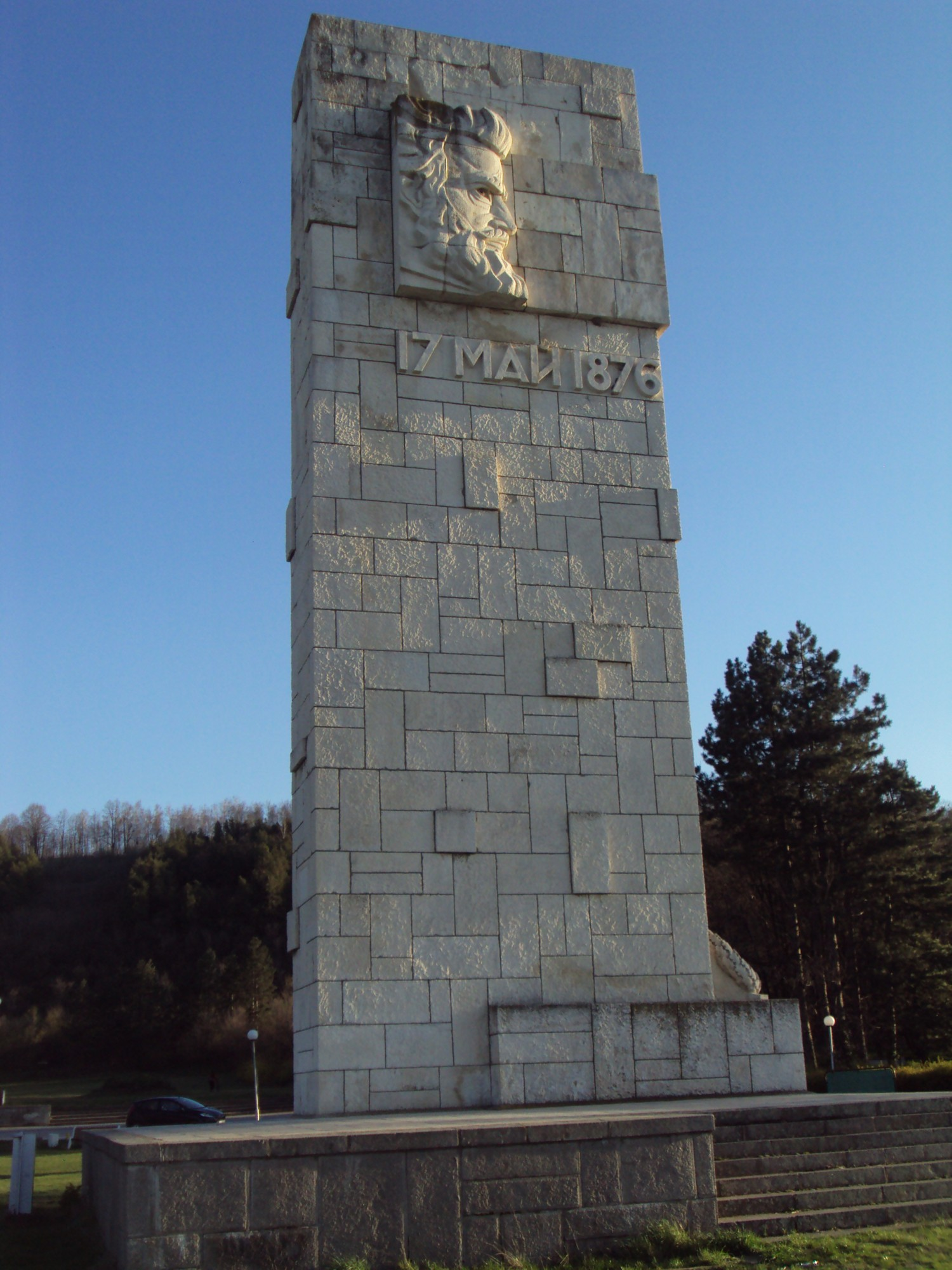

The Radetzky (Bulgarian: „Радецки“, „Radetski“) was an Austro-Hungarian passenger steamship built in 1851 in the shipyard in Óbuda, Hungary, and used for regular services on the Danube, mainly between Orşova, Austria-Hungary and Galaţi, Romania. Named after Bohemian nobleman and Austrian general Joseph Radetzky von Radetz (1766–1858), it is most notable as part of the history of Bulgaria as the ship which revolutionary and poet Hristo Botev and his band bloodlessly hijacked and used to reach Kozloduy, Bulgaria.

On 29 May 1876, after the ship left the port of Bechet, the Bulgarian revolutionaries, who had boarded her from different ports disguised as gardeners, forced the captain Dagobert Engländer to change course and transport the band to the Bulgarian port of Kozloduy, from where they would attempt to organize an anti-Ottoman uprising as a follow-up to the already crushed April Uprising of the same year. Botev sent the following message to the crew and the passengers:

Mr Captain!
Dear passengers!

I have the honour to notify you that Bulgarian rebels, whom I have the honour to be the voivode of, are located on this steamship.

At the price of our livestock and our agricultural instruments, at the expense of great efforts and sacrifice of our goods, finally at the price of everything which is dear in this world (without the knowledge and despite the pursuit of the authorities in the country whose neutrality we respected), we have provided ourselves with what is necessary to us, in order to come to the assistance of our revolting brothers, who are fighting so brave under the Bulgarian lion for the liberty and independence of our dear Fatherland — Bulgaria.

We kindly ask the passengers to not worry at all and remain calm. As for you, Mr. Captain, I have the hard duty to invite you to place the ship at our disposal until our very getting-off, while at the same time I declare that even your smallest resistance will put me in the sorrowful necessity to use force and against my will to revenge for the disgusting incident on board the Germany steamboat in Rousse in 1867.

In one case or the other, our battle cry is the following:

Long live Bulgaria!
Long live Franz Joseph!
Long live Count Andrássy!

Long live Christian Europe!

The captain wrote of Botev's "civility, energy and temperament", and agreed to transport the band to Kozloduy. Upon arriving in Bulgaria, the revolutionaries dropped on their knees and kissed the earth, saying goodbye to the captain and the passengers, who saluted them by waving his peaked cap.

The Radetzky was decommissioned in 1918 and destroyed in 1924, although most of its relics were preserved, such as the flag with a coat of arms, a seal, the original licence, etc., which were handed by Adolf Engländer, a brother of the captain, to Boris III of Bulgaria. Between 1964 and 1966, On the occasion of the 90th anniversary of Hristo Botev's death, money was collected by 1,200,000 Bulgarian pupils on the initiative of the journalist Lilyana Lozanova, and the steamship was reconstructed based on the original design and technical data given by the ship's dyer Király József. The reconstructed Radetzky was officially opened as a museum ship on 30 May 1966 at Kozloduy. It is a composite of a 1953 soviet paddle tug, and pieces of the original Radetzky saved in 1918.

The steamship Radetzky is a national relic of Bulgaria. A village in Sliven Province bears its name, Radetski, and national writer Ivan Vazov wrote a poem based on the events of May 1876, which is today a popular patriotic song called Still White Danube Undulates.
