= Harold Stevens (civil servant) =

Indian civil servant

Sir Harold Stevens KCIE, CSI, MC

Chief Secretary of the Government of Bengal
- Governor: Frederick Burrows
- Succeeded by: Post abolished
- In office October 1944 – 15 August 1947

Personal details
- Born: 29 November 1892 Bareilly, North-Western Provinces, British Raj (now Uttar Pradesh, India)
- Died: 23 July 1969 (aged 76) Bexhill-on-Sea, Sussex, England, United Kingdom
- Military career
- Allegiance: United Kingdom
- Branch: British Army
- Service years: 1909–1919
- Unit: Royal Scots
- Conflicts: First World War
- Awards: Military Cross

Sir Harold Samuel Eaton Stevens KCIE, CSI, MC (29 November 1892 – 23 July 1969) was an Indian Civil Service officer and the last British Chief Secretary of the Bengal Presidency.

== Career ==
Educated at George Heriot's School and the University of Edinburgh, Stevens joined the Indian Civil Service in 1920, rising to become Chief Secretary of Bengal in October 1944. He was knighted as a Knight Commander of the Order of the Indian Empire (KCIE) in the 1947 Birthday Honours list.
