= Kriva Bara, Vratsa Province =

Kriva Bara Крива бара
- Village
- Location in Bulgaria
- Coordinates: 43°38′0″N 23°43′0″E
- Country: Bulgaria
- Province (Oblast): Vratsa
- Municipality: Kozloduy Municipality

Government
  - Mayor: Tsvetan Yordanov (Ind.)

Area
  - Total: 15,542 km^{2} (6,001 sq mi)
- Elevation: 55 m (180 ft)

Population (2015)
  - Total: 414
- Postal code: 3328
- Area code: 09168
- Vehicle registration: ВР

Kriva Bara (Bulgarian: Крива бара) is a village in northwestern Bulgaria. It is located in the Kozloduy Municipality of the Vratsa Province.

A village of the same name also exists in the Brusartsi municipality of the Montana Province in Bulgaria.
