= Harold Stevens (broadcaster) =

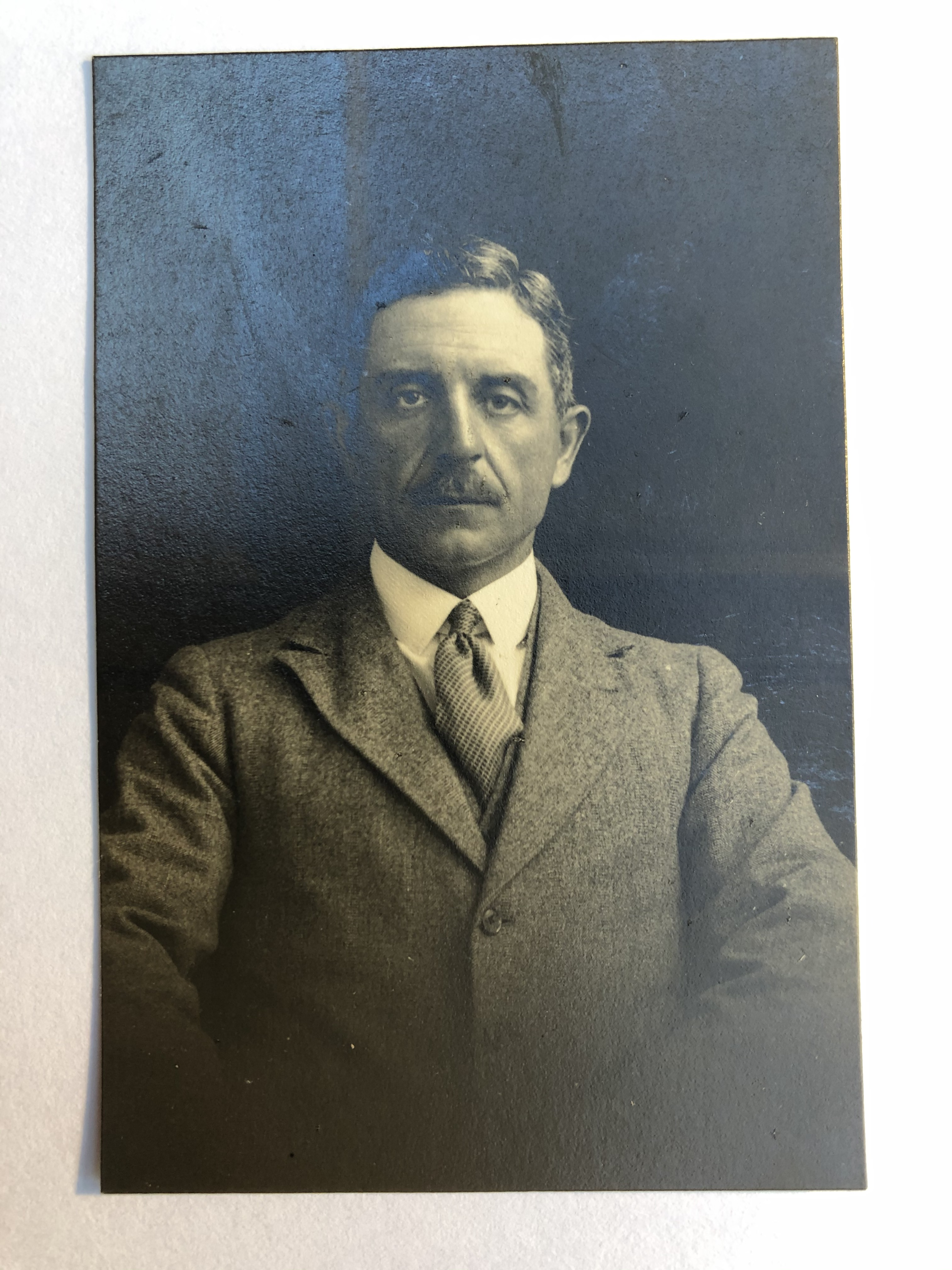
Col H R G Stevens 1935 Col H R G Stevens (later) Col H R G Stevens

Colonel Harold Raphael Gaetano Stevens, CMG DSO (4 May 1883 – 1 January 1961), also known as Il Colonello Buonasera, served in the British army and worked as a BBC broadcaster and was known for his broadcasts to Italy during World War II.

Stevens was born 4 May 1883 in Naples and educated at Beaumont College, and at the Royal Military Academy, Woolwich. Stevens served in World War I on the General Staff in Gallipoli, the Black Sea area and Turkey. He was awarded the DSO in 1917 and the French Croix de Guerre, the Greek Order of Military Merit and the Order of the Redeemer.

Stevens' mother was Italian and in 1931 he was appointed Military Attaché at the British embassy in Rome. He returned to London in 1935 and was Commander R.A., 56th (1st London) Division, T.A. He retired in 1936 and joined the Home Office in the A.R.P. department.

In 1940, he joined the BBC European Service and broadcast to Italy for Radio Londra from 1940–1945. He spoke perfect Italian and became well known as 'Il Colonello Buonasera' due to the 'Good Evening' at the beginning of each of his broadcasts. The broadcasts became a key contribution to the war effort in countering anti-Fascist propaganda and delivering messages to the Italian resistance. Many Italians tuned into his 5 minute broadcasts, five nights a week at 10pm which began with the opening notes of Beethoven's 5th Symphony [likely representing 'V' for Victory in morse code]. The vehemency of Fascist counter-attacks attested to their impact. When British troops landed in Sicily in 1943, they were puzzled to find chalked on the walls of houses the words "Viva Stivens". The words meant nothing to them, but to the Italians, it was the best known British name after Churchill.

Harold married first in 1905 to Bertha Gordon, daughter of Charles Gordon, by whom he had 3 sons: Colonel John Auverny Stevens O.B.E., Lieutenant Colonel Charles Phillips Stevens M.B.E. (who later became Director of the National Spastics Society) and Major Geoffrey Gordon Stevens, and a daughter, Sister Helen Mary Stevens of the Religious Society of the Sacred Heart. Bertha died in 1947 and Stevens married Helen Elisabeth Fraser Gordon.

Colonel Stevens was an ardent Catholic and begun each day with attendance at Mass. He maintained close ties with Rome and the Papacy and became a Tertiary of St Francis. Stevens died 1 January 1961 in Bournemouth, England, and a requiem mass was held at Westminster Cathedral.

== General references ==
- Lawrence, Anthony (2 January 1961). "Appreciation of Colonel Harold Stevens". BBC Home Service.
