= German People's Radio =

Soviet German-language radio station during World War II

Deutscher Volkssender
- Moscow, Russian SFSR; Soviet Union
- Broadcast area: Central and Eastern Europe

Programming
- Language: German

Ownership
- Operator: Communist Party of Germany

German People's Radio (German: Deutscher Volkssender) was a German-language radio station operating from Moscow, Russian SFSR, Soviet Union, during World War II.

== History ==
In January 1937 German Freedom Radio was established by the Communist Party of Germany (KPD). Its transmitter and studios were located in Madrid, but editorial direction was largely determined by the KPD leadership based in Paris. Ernest Hemingway and Heinrich Mann both are recorded as having written scripts for German Freedom Radio.

In March 1939, German Freedom Radio was forced off-air as Madrid fell to the Spanish Nationalist forces. It resurfaced in Moscow, signing on-air on 10 September 1941 as German People's Radio and using the slogan "the Voice of the International Peace Movement".

== Programming ==
Operated by the KPD and largely staffed by Germans, German People's Radio broadcasts were designed to demoralize the German military and to inspire subversive acts within Germany. In order to inflate perceptions of the operational capacity of the underground resistance to the Nazi Party, programs were presented as though they originated from inside Germany and that the station was a pirate radio broadcaster operated by Germany-based critics of Adolf Hitler.

The Associated Press re-reported some broadcasts of German People's Radio; on 27 July 1944 it cited German People's Radio in describing that "demonstrations were spreading throughout Upper Silesia" and that "anti-Hitler opposition groups" had been staging protests in the coal mining districts of Königshütte, Hindenburg, Gleiwitz, and Breslau. The same year it reported on a German People's Radio story that "foreign workers" had ambushed an SS unit near Berlin and fought a three-day battle against it.

Though it predated Soldatensender Calais, later broadcasts of German People's Radio were reportedly inspired by it.

== Staff ==
Markus Wolf, later head of the Main Directorate for Reconnaissance of the German Democratic Republic's Ministry of State Security, worked as a newsreader on German People's Radio from 1943 to 1945. Other people who worked at the station at various times included Walter Ulbricht, Erich Weinert, Hedda Zinner, Anton Ackermann, Willi Bredel, and Wilhelm Pieck.

== See also ==
- Radio 1212, a similar radio station sponsored by the United States
- Radio Milano-Libertà, the Soviet equivalent for Italian broadcasts
