= Radio Milano-Libertà =

Italian-language communist radio station

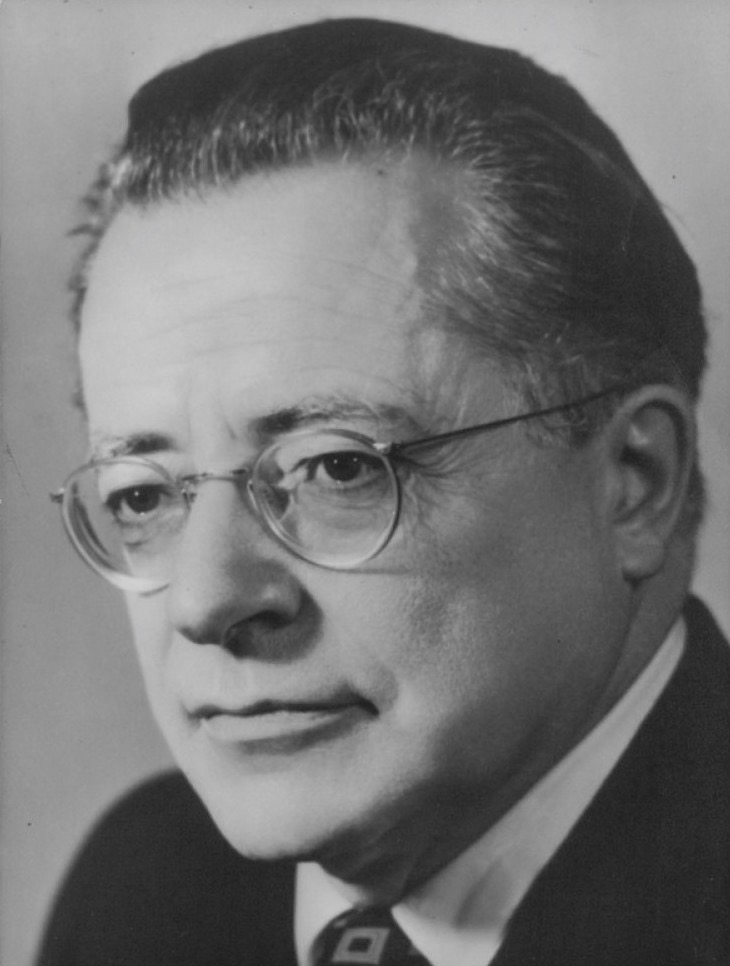
Palmiro Togliatti, General-Secretary of the Italian Communist Party, broadcast from and directed Radio Milano-Libertà during WWII

Radio Milano Libertà (sometimes also Radio Milano-Libertà ) was a clandestine radio station of the Italian Communist Party, active in two distinct phases, between 1936 and 1937, and again between 1941 and 1945, that spread anti-fascist propaganda before and during World War II. After the war, the station was renamed Oggi In Italia and functioned as the clandestine voice of Italian Communists.

Initially established in Barcelona in the autumn of 1936 as Radio Milano Liberta, during the Spanish Civil War, the station was founded by communist militants enrolled in the International Brigades with the aim of countering fascist propaganda. After a period of interruption due to the defeat of the Spanish Republican forces, the station was reconstituted in Moscow under the name Radio Milano Libertà in July 1941 following the invasion of the Soviet Union by Nazi Germany. Under the supervision of the Communist International and the political direction of Secretary Palmiro Togliatti, the station became a point of reference for the Italian Resistance, operating continuously until January 24, 1944.

== Radio Milano Liberta During the Spanish Civil War ==
In the autumn of 1936, following the outbreak of the Spanish Civil War and the formation of the International Brigades, militants from the Communist Party of Italy who had joined the Republican Army decided to set up a radio station abroad to conduct anti-fascist propaganda aimed at Italy. Thus, the Communist Party of Italy's radio station—Radio Milano Liberta—was established in Barcelona; its broadcasts were first intercepted by Fascist authorities on October 26, 1936. The name was chosen to mislead Fascist censors and create the impression that the station was located within Italian territory. The broadcasts aired daily at 10:45 PM, and were broadcast on a wavelength of 28 meters. The station's activity intensified in 1937—particularly following the Republican victory at the Battle of Guadalajara on March 23, 1937—despite interference caused by stations belonging to the Società Italiana Radiomarittima and Italo Radio. As the Nationalists advanced, Radio Milano's broadcasts became increasingly infrequent, though the station had never managed to reach a wide audience due to its clandestine nature, as well as technical difficulties and the limited penetration of radio sets.

== Establishment ==
Radio Milano-Libertà was resurrected after the invasion of the Soviet Union by Germany, and was among a number of Soviet radio stations created during the Second World War to broadcast communist propaganda to other countries in local languages. They operated from a wing of the headquarters of the Comintern, the Soviet propaganda organisation based in Moscow. Radio Milano-Libertà began broadcasting in 1941 and was operated by Italian expatriates living in the Soviet Union and who were refugees from Mussolini's fascist regime.

== Second World War ==
In June 1941, the Germans invaded the Soviet Union and Stalin adopted the objective of creating a broad anti-fascist alliance across Europe. Palmiro Togliatti, who was General-Secretary of the Italian Communist Party and had been in exile in the Soviet Union, was given responsibility for the Italian radio stations, including Radio Milano-Libertà, in early summer 1941. Adopting the pseudonym of Mario Correnti, Togliatti used the station to broadcast his own impassioned speeches to listeners in Italy encouraging them to rise up and overthrow Mussolini and the fascists.

Although the station was broadcasting from Moscow, it adopted, what was at the time, the innovative strategy of pretending it was operating from Italy. The purpose was to give the impression that the resistance movement within the country was substantial and well organised. In fact, at that stage of the war, the opposite was the case. Although the audience may have been limited in numbers, there is evidence that the illusion was believed. For example, Vatican Radio was forced to declare that it was the only Italian radio station that truly had authority to represent the country's Catholics. Another innovation was that it began presenting itself not as a communist station but as a platform for all Italians across the political spectrum opposed to "fascist tyranny and German vassalage". This formed part of the strategy to create a broad anti-fascist alliance. The broadcasts were re-oriented to popular nationalist themes such as the Risorgimento, Garibaldi, the history of ancient Rome and the nationalist poetry of Leopardi and Carducci. These were interspersed with crude personal insults directed at Mussolini and the fascist gerarchi.

Following the Allied invasion of Italy and subsequent armistice, the fascists retreated to the centre and north of the country to establish the Italian Social Republic, a German puppet state. From September 1943, the resistance movement became more of a reality. In a broadcast on Radio Milano-Libertà on 30 October 1943, Togliatti declared:

in the north and centre we must move to mass organised war against the Germans...the expulsion of the invader requires a struggle on our part organised in a particular way...It is the duty of the anti-fascists to undertake the creation everywhere of an organisation and a direction that allows us to move from more or less isolated acts or groups, to the real war of large units of partisans against the invader

The struggle between the partisans and the fascists intensified into the bitter conflict now referred to as the Italian Civil War. Radio Milano-Libertà's part in this was to incite the killing of fascist officials and supporters, to disseminate information on where specific fascists lived, how they could be identified and tracked down and to issue intimidating warnings to them. The objective was, in part, to impact the morale of the fascists and to give them the sense of being hunted.

The radio station continued to operate until Togliatti returned to Italy in April 1944. (Note: This is based on the following assertion by Valerio Romitelli, an historian at the University of Bologna: "...the activity of this radio station extended to practically all the first years of the war until the moment when the direction of history was reversed and Togliatti decided on his great return to Italy following the 'Salerno turn' [Svolta di Salerno] of 1 April 1944". Togliatti returned to Italy in April 1944. However, aside from the April 1945 CLNAI broadcasts subsequently referred to, at least one source makes reference to a broadcast by the station after Togliatti's return: in November 1944.) Nevertheless, the declaration by the partisan leadership of a national uprising on 25 April 1945, in the final days of the war, was made in a radio broadcast from Milan as Radio Milano-Libertà. According to Pietro Secchia, the broadcast announced:

Patriots of the North! ... Radio Milano-Libertà, authorized by the CLNAI, asks you to take up arms and rise up in all cities and provinces.

On the 27 April, with the final defeat of the Germans and the fascists imminent, Sandro Pertini, the Socialist partisan leader in northern Italy announced Mussolini's capture on Radio Milano-Libertà:

...the head of this association of delinquents, Mussolini, while yellow with rancour and fear and trying to cross the Swiss frontier, has been arrested. He must be handed over to a tribunal of the people so it can judge him quickly. We want this, even though we think an execution platoon is too much of an honour for this man. He would deserve to be killed like a mangy dog.

The following day, Mussolini was summarily executed by an Italian partisan in the village of Giulino.

== See also ==
- German People's Radio
- Radio Londra

== Bibliography ==
- Bosworth, R.J.B. (2014). Mussolini. Bloomsbury Publishing. ISBN 978-1-84966-444-8.
- Cacciatore, Nicola (2023). Italian Partisans and British Forces in the Second World War: Working with the Enemy. Springer. ISBN 978-3-031-28682-7.
- De Graaf, Jan (2019). Socialism across the Iron Curtain: Socialist Parties in East and West and the Reconstruction of Europe after 1945. Cambridge University Press. ISBN 978-1-108-42508-7.
- Di Rienzo, Eugenio (2023). Sotto altra bandiera: Antifascisti italiani al servizio di Churchill (in Italian). Neri Pozza. ISBN 978-88-545-2753-9.
- Kennedy, David M., ed. (2007). The Library of Congress World War II Companion. Simon & Schuster. ISBN 978-1-4165-5306-9.
- Moseley, Ray (2004). Mussolini: The Last 600 Days of Il Duce. Taylor Trade Publications. ISBN 978-1-58979-095-7.
- Pavone, Claudio (1991). Una guerra civile. Saggio storico sulla moralità della Resistenza (in Italian). Torino: Bollati Boringhieri. ISBN 978-88-339-0629-4.
- Payne, Stanley G. (1996). A History of Fascism, 1914–1945. University of Wisconsin Press. ISBN 978-0-299-14873-7.
- Preziosi, Giovanni (25 April 2015). "La Resistenza in convento e la Liberazione". La Stampa (in Italian).
- Quartermaine, Luisa (2000). Mussolini's Last Republic: Propaganda and Politics in the Italian Social Republic (R.S.I.) 1943–45. Intellect Books. ISBN 978-1-902454-08-5.
- Romitelli, Valerio (2012). "Radio Milano Libertà entre URSS et Italie, du début des années 1940 à l'après-guerre". Cahiers de la Méditerranée (in French). 85: 41–47. doi:10.4000/cdlm.6649. S2CID 193852885.
- Secchia, Pietro (2022) [First published in 1963 by Feltrinelli]. Aldo dice: 26x1: chronistoria del 25 Aprile 1945 (in Italian). PGreco. ISBN 978-88-6802-426-0.
- Soley, Lawrence C. (1989). Radio Warfare: OSS and CIA Subversive Propaganda (PDF). Praeger. ISBN 978-0-275-93051-6.
- Togliatti, Palmiro (1974). Da Radio Milano-Libertà (in Italian). Riuniti - Rinascita. ASIN B005RL8HUC.
- Wilsford, David (1995). "Palmiro Togliatti". Political Leaders of Contemporary Western Europe: A Biographical Dictionary. Greenwood Press. ISBN 978-0-313-28623-0.
