= Kozloduy Island =

Bulgarian Danubian island

Coordinates: 43°47′34″N 23°43′48″E

Kozloduy Island (Bulgarian: остров Козлодуй, ostrov Kozloduy) is the second largest Bulgarian Danubian island (after Belene Island). Located opposite the town of Kozloduy, it is 11.7 km in length and between 0.5 and 2 km in width, with an area of 23.4 km^{2}.

The island raises 3-4 metre above the river and the flora consists of river poplar trees. Birds known to nest on the island include wild geese and wild ducks.

As the distance from the bank is 200 m, the island is only accessible by boat.
