= Hristo Botev =

Bulgarian poet and revolutionary (1848-1876)

- Христо Ботев
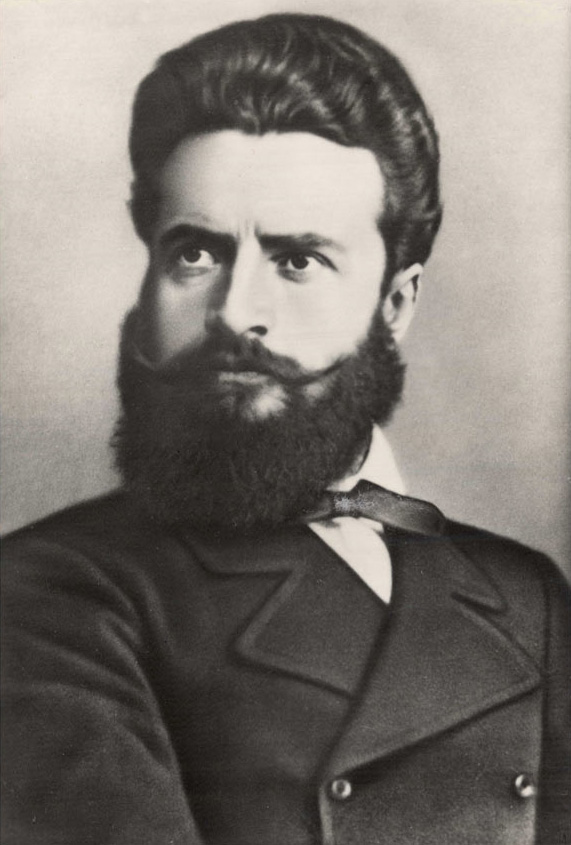
- Botev c. 1875
- Born: Hristo Botyov Petkov; 6 January 1848; Kalofer, Ottoman Empire
- Died: 1 June 1876 (aged 28); Near Vratsa, Ottoman Empire
- Occupations: Poet, journalist, revolutionary
- Spouse: Veneta Boteva
- Children: Ivanka Boteva

Hristo Botev (Bulgarian: Христо Ботев, pronounced [ˈxristo ˈbɔtɛf]), born Hristo Botyov Petkov (Христо Ботьов Петков; 6 January 1848 [O.S. 25 December 1847] – 1 June [O.S. 20 May] 1876) was a Bulgarian revolutionary, poet and journalist. He participated in the Bulgarian revolutionary movement as a member of the Bulgarian Revolutionary Central Committee. Botev is honoured in Bulgaria.

== Early life ==
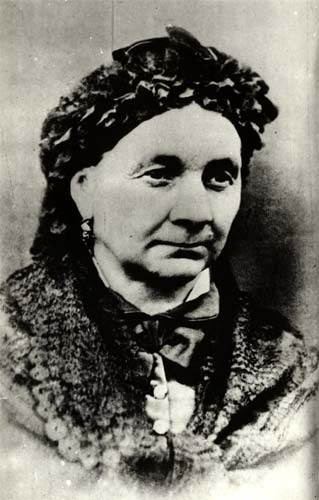
Ivanka Boteva, Botev's mother

=== Family background and childhood ===
Botev was born on 6 January 1848 [O.S. 25 December 1847] in Kalofer, Ottoman Empire (modern Bulgaria). The birthplace is disputed by several historians, stating that he was born in Karlovo (according to the letter of Nayden Gerov) or the small village of Osen. His father was Botyo Petkov and his mother was Ivanka Boteva.

His father was a teacher and a significant figure of the Bulgarian National Revival. His mother was born in a modest Kalofer family. Botev was not the only child in the family, he was together with his eight siblings, which were Ana, Petko, Stefan, Kiril, Tota, Genko, Genko and Boyan.

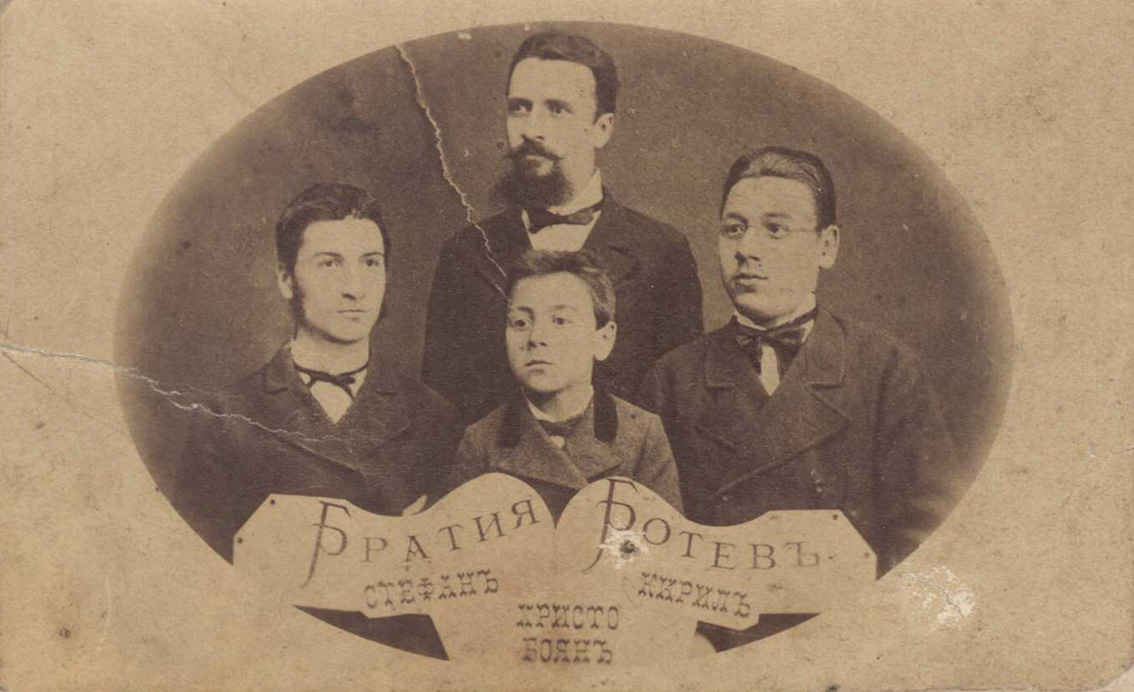
The Botev brothers (Botev is pictured in the middle, upper row.)

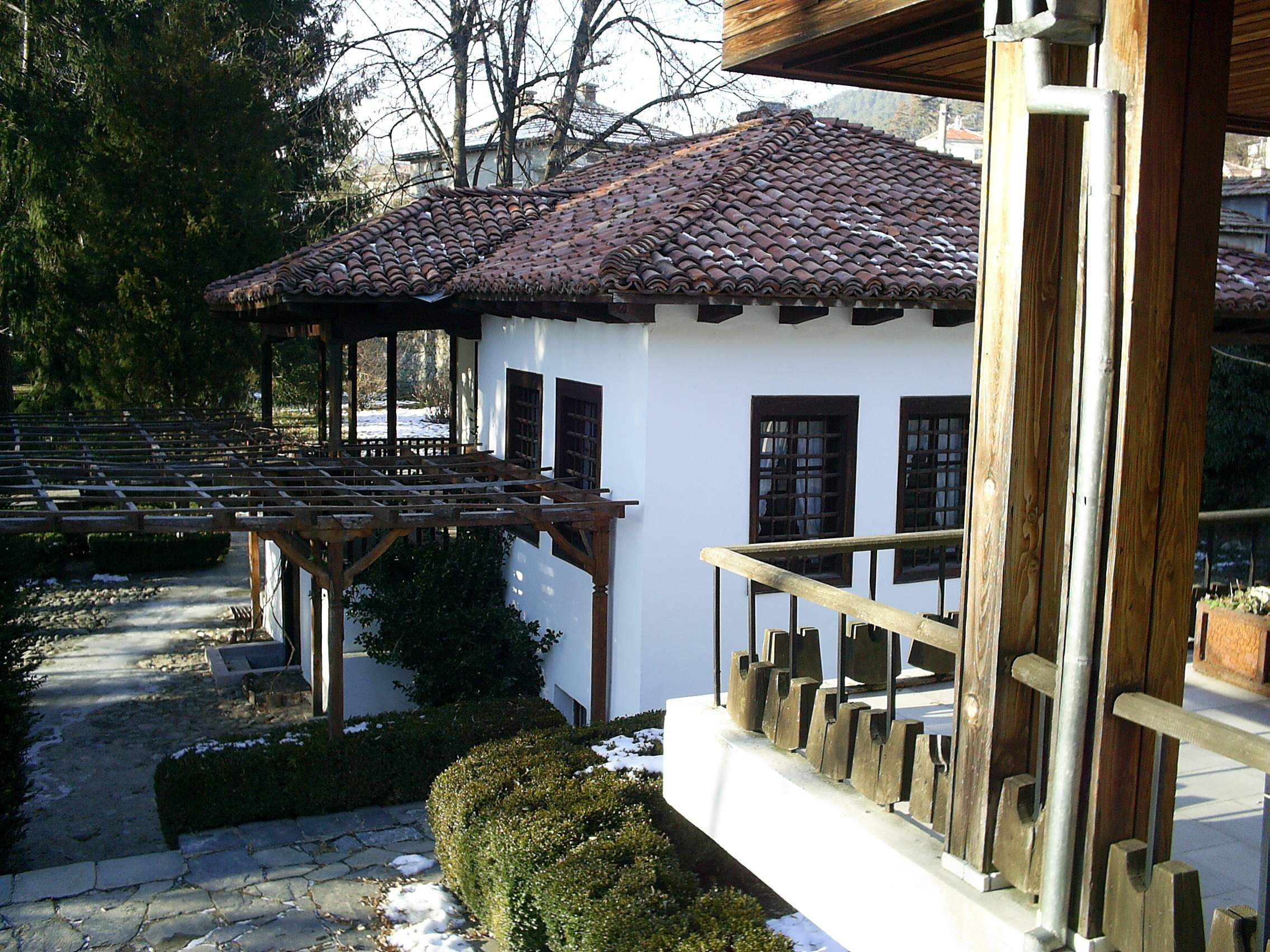
Botev's house in Kalofer

According to some sources, Botev was born in a room of the Kalofer school where his parents lived. A little later, a new school was built in Kalofer and the family rented a house where Botev spent the first years of his life. This house was destroyed during the 1877-1878 Russo-Turkish War, but in the 1940s it was rebuilt and turned into the Hristo Botev National Museum.

=== Education ===
In 1854, his father failed to reach an agreement with the Kalofer district about his salary and moved to Karlovo. There the family lived in his mother's house in Tabashka Mahala, and Botev went to school with his father as his teacher. In 1858, Petkov accused the administration of the Karlovo district of embezzling money that had been bequeathed to the school and then returned to Kalofer. The district tried unsuccessfully accommodating him in a house belonging to the merchant Hristo Tupchilestov, who lived in Constantinople, whereupon the family moved into the house of Hadzhi Nestor. After returning to Kalofer, Botev attended the local three-class school, where his father was a teacher.

As early as 1857, Petkov tried to send his son to study in the Russian Empire with the help of Nayden Gerov, an acquaintance from Odessa who had become a well-known pedagogue and Russian vice-consul in Plovdiv. This was only possible in the autumn of 1863, when Botev had finished primary education and received a scholarship from the Russian government and travelled via Plovdiv and Constantinople to Odessa, where he arrived on 14 November. In Odessa, Botev turned to the Bulgarian Board of Trustees of Odessa, to whom he was able to present a letter of recommendation from Nayden Gerov, and to its member Nikola Toshkovich, a wealthy merchant born in Kalofer, who was an acquaintance of his father. He entered the Second Grammar School as a "volunteer", as he was not well prepared to be a regular student, and was placed in the boarding school, where there were ten other Bulgarian students at the time.

From the moment he entered high school, Botev found it difficult to fit in - he constantly complained about the strict discipline, which included corporal punishment, but at the same time he was often absent from lessons, got into fights with classmates and treated most of his teachers with arrogance. In 1864, he left the boarding school and began to live independently in various lodgings. Despite his father's insistent letters and Nikola Toshkov's attempts to influence him, he neglected school and alienated the Bulgarians in Odessa with his eccentric behaviour, many of whose representatives restricted their contacts with him.

Although he did not attend school often, Botev spent a lot of time in various libraries, especially in the Bulgarian library Yuriy Venelin, which was located in Toshkov's house. He read mainly Russian authors and was particularly impressed by Nikolay Chernyshevsky and Ivan Turgenev. He became acquainted with the philologist Victor Grigorovich, whom he assisted in translating Bulgarian folk tunes into Russian. According to his classmate Kiro Tuleshkov, Botev was already working on his poem "Mother" in the summer of 1864, consulting Grigorovich, and sent it to Petko Slaveykov in Constantinople even then. The reliability of this information is not clear, as the poem was not published by Slaveykov until several years later.

When it became apparent in September 1865 that Botev was failing the gymnasium's third grade and was expelled for "carelessness," his scholarship was cancelled, and he was given money to travel back to Ottoman Bulgaria. Still, he stayed in Odessa, earning a living through private instruction and keeping in touch with the city's Polish population. Botev even registered as a "volunteer" at the Historical and Philological Faculty of the Imperial Novorossiya University with the help of Grigorovich. Botev also taught in Bessarabia, having written his first poetic works and established strong connections with the Russian and Polish revolutionary movements.

=== Return to Kalofer ===
Following his return to Kalofer in 1867, Botev replaced his ill father as a teacher, introducing subjects such as geography, history and civil law. At that time, on 15 April, Botev's poem "To My Mother" was published for the first time in the journal "Gaida" which was published in Constantinople and was edited by Petko Slaveykov. The poem was published without a recognised author. During the 11 May observance of the Day of the Holy Brothers Cyril and Methodius, Botev delivered an impromptu speech criticising the national movement's moderation, which at the time was primarily focused on the creation of an independent church. Police threats were raised by the speech, but none materialised. Botev frequently visited Parashkeva Shushulova, a teacher at the nearby girls' school, during his time in Kalofer. She is said to be the most likely prototype for the beloved in some of his poetry.

== Emigrant in Romania ==
Botev was sent by his father after getting better from the illness to Odessa once again to resume his education. Using his father's money to get to Constantinople and then Odessa, he did not follow through and without informing his parents, decided to go to Romania instead. Botev arrived in Giurgiu, at the end of September 1867. There, he quickly made contact with Bulgarian émigrés, including Hadzhi Dimitar and several members of the cheta that Filip Totyu and Panayot Hitov had formed that previous year. Following the announcement of the death of famed revolutionary Georgi Rakovski, they travelled to Bucharest to attend his burial on 12 October 1867. Lacking any money, Botev went to Georgi Atanasovich, who gave him the money he needed to continue on his way to Odessa. He resumed his trip to Odessa, which was then unfinished and stopped in Brăila. There, he began working as a word-editor and published his second elegy "To your brother".

For some time he lived in an abandoned mill near Bucharest with Vasil Levski, the eventual leader of the Bulgarian Secret Resistance Committees, and the two of them initially became close friends. From 1869 to 1871, Botev worked again as a teacher in Bessarabia, keeping close relations with the Bulgarian revolutionary movement and its leaders. In June 1871, he became the editor of the revolutionary emigrant newspaper Word of the Bulgarian Emigrants (Duma na bulgarskite emigranti), where he began publishing his early poetic works. Imprisoned for months, due to his close collaboration with the Russian revolutionaries, Botev started working for the "Liberty" (Svoboda) newspaper, edited by the eminent Bulgarian writer and revolutionary Lyuben Karavelov. In 1873, he also edited the satirical newspaper "Alarm clock" (Budilnik), where he published a number of feuilletons, targeting those wealthy Bulgarians who did not take part in the revolutionary movement. During the last years of his life, Botev gave up poetry for activism.

The Bulgarian revolutionary movement was put in danger with the capture of Levski by Ottoman authorities at the end of 1872. At the time Levski was the indisputable leader of the Bulgarian insurgency. He had established a network of revolutionary committees, supervised by the Bulgarian Revolutionary Central Committee (BRCC; In Bulgarian: БРЦК) located in Romania, which was tasked with preparing the Bulgarian revolutionaries for a future general uprising against Ottoman rule. Levski was brought to trial, sentenced to death by hanging and executed on 19 February 1873. His death was a serious blow to the morale of the revolutionary movement.

With Levski's death, the BRCC split into two factions: Botev and his supporters, including Stefan Stambolov and Panayot Hitov backed the idea that preparations should be started for an immediate uprising, while the moderate revolutionaries, led by Lyuben Karavelov, thought that it was too early for such actions. Botev intended to start an uprising at the first possible moment, to take advantage of the international situation (the mounting tension between the Ottoman Empire on one side, and Serbia and Russia on the other), and because the revolutionary network, established by Levski, was still relatively intact and could take an active part in the preparations. The revolt in Bosnia and Herzegovina in 1875 inspired Botev and Stambolov to think that a rebellion should start soon in Ottoman Bulgaria as well. They thought that the greater the turmoil in the Balkans, the more attention this would attract among the Great Powers. In the beginning of August in 1875 Karavelov, already quite ill, stepped down as president of BRCC, and Botev was elected as the new president. Thinking that the Bulgarian people were ever ready for a rebellion, he believed no careful preparations were needed. In the same year, Botev got married and later ended up having a daughter with his wife.

== Cheta and death ==
In the April Uprising of 1876, an experienced leader recruited to command the Liberation of Bulgaria (known as voivoda) refused for political reasons. Botev himself took overall command of the company. Military expertise was provided by Nikola Voinovski (1849–1876). According to a letter he wrote before crossing the Danube in May 1876: "I'm in high spirits and my joy is boundless, thinking that 'My Prayer' is going to be fulfilled", referring to the verses in his poem "My Prayer":

Make powerful this hand of mine
for the rising of the slaves;
I'll join them at the battle-line
that I may find my grave.

Botev devised an ingenious plan for crossing into Ottoman territory without immediately alerting either the Romanian or the Ottoman authorities. The rebels, disguised as gardeners, boarded in groups at the Romanian ports of Zimnicea, Turnu Măgurele, Corabia, Bechet the Austro-Hungarian passenger steamship Radetzky. When the last group boarded at Bechet the rebels retrieved their concealed weapons and seized control of the ship (this incident was later commemorated in a popular poem and song).

The company almost immediately became the focus of incessant bashi-bazouk attacks. Voinovski displayed some excellent defensive tactics helped by the still high morale and discipline of the company. On 18 May, the massing bashi-bazouks caught up with the company in force, and Botev had to go to ground on the Milin Kamak Hill some 50 km from the Danube.

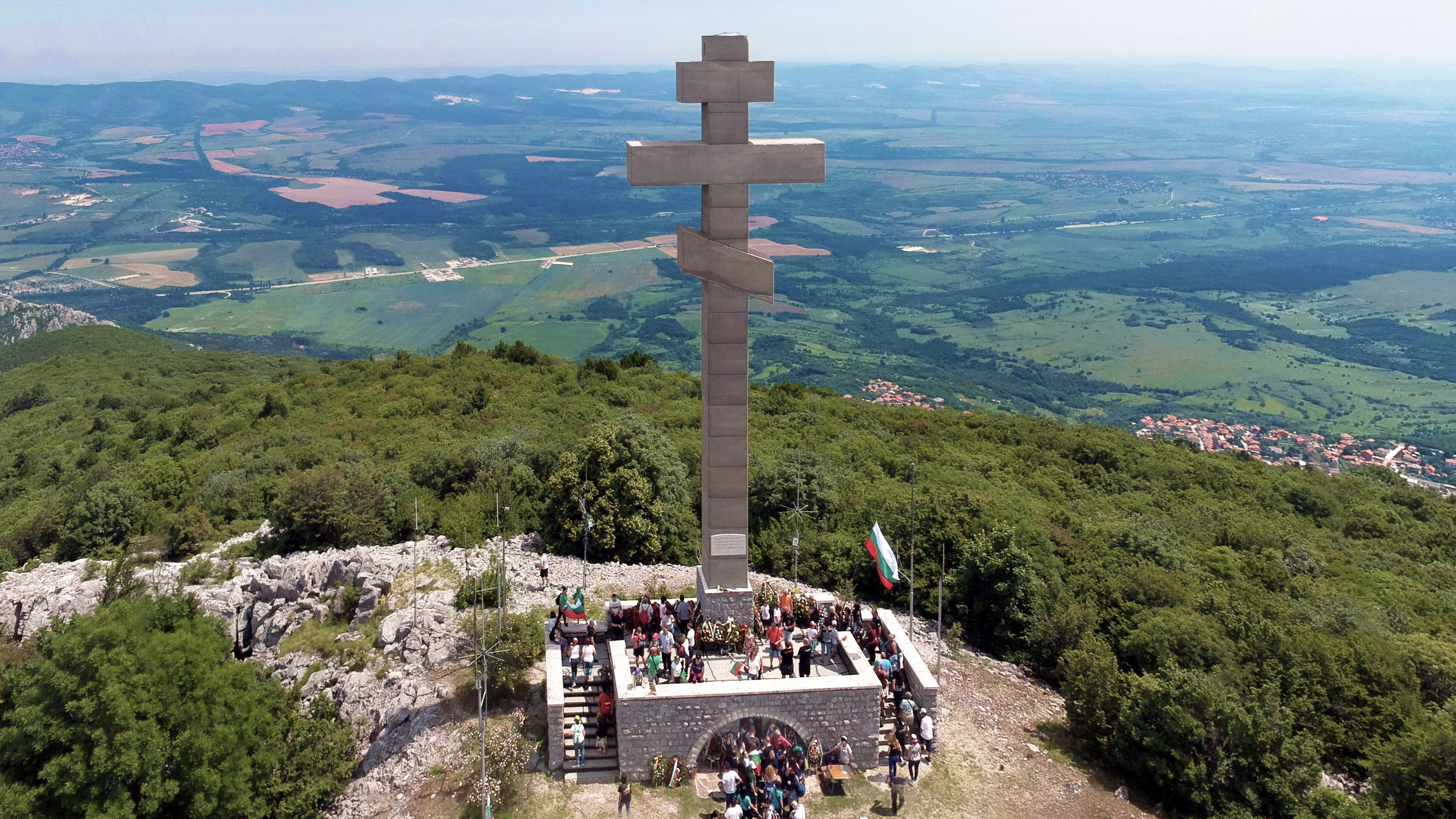
The monument on top of Mount Okolchitsa commemorates Botev and all those who were killed fighting for the independence of Bulgaria.

The next day passed without sighting the enemy, but at this point it was obvious that no local reinforcements could be expected. On the morning of 20 May (1 June in the new style), sentries detected advancing bashi-bazouks and five companies of regular Ottoman troops. The defense was divided into two sectors, one commanded by Voinovski and the other by Botev. Botev was shot dead at the age of 28 by the Ottomans in the evening near Vratsa, after his band had battled a Circassian militia and Ottoman troops at the outskirts of Balkan Mountains. It is unknown whether Botev died at Okolchitsa or Vola. The locals did not cooperate with his band. His band was dismantled after his death.

== Literary works and views ==
Botev published a poem titled "Elegy" in 1870, which begins with "Tell me, tell me, o unhappy people, Who lulls you in the cradle of slavery?", referring to the inaction of Bulgarians and their failure to fight against oppression. Botev was an utopian socialist. His utopian socialism was seemingly influenced by Russian revolutionaries, such as Nikolay Chernyshevsky and Sergei Nechaev, and the Paris Commune. Botev welcomed the ideas about a political and social revolution promoted by the organisers of the Paris Commune. In his poem "Why Am I Not?", he attacked contemporary literary figures, such as Petko Slaveykov and Ivan Vazov for what Botev considered their wrong approach to literature and life. For example, he could not tolerate Vazov's tendency to omit antagonisms within Bulgarian society. In 1875, Botev read the works of Karl Marx and Friedrich Engels, such as the Manifesto of the Communist Party and the first volume of Capital in Russian translation. His literary work was influenced by writers Lord Byron, Alexander Pushkin and Mikhail Lermontov. In his poems, he included themes from Bulgarian folklore. He was also influenced by the poetry and the views of Georgi Rakovski. Alexander Herzen and Mikhail Bakunin were the most significant influences on his worldview.

In 1875, he co-authored his one and only poetry book Songs and Poems by Botev and Stambolov (Bulgarian: Песни и стихотворения от Ботьова и Стамболова), along with his close associate Bulgarian revolutionary poet and future politician and statesman, Stefan Stambolov. These poems represent the sentiments of poor people, who had revolutionary ideas and were struggling for their freedom against tyranny. Many of the poems are revolutionary, such as "My prayer", "At farewell", "Hajduks", "In the tavern" and "Struggle". Other poems include, such as the romantic and balladic "Hadzhi Dimitar" (dedicated to the death of his friend) and "The hanging of Vasil Levski". Botev's poetry book is regarded as one of the greatest achievements in Bulgarian literature.

For him, an authentic progress of Bulgarian society was impossible within the Ottoman Empire, and he labelled his contemporaries as "mad", "sick", and "garbage" if they permitted such a possibility. People of a high class were depicted by him as "immoral" and "lewd". He associated and compared Muslim Turks with pigs. In his article, "The people. Yesterday, today, and tomorrow", he argued not only that the Ottoman period is bad but also that the medieval Bulgarian state in the past was not much better, while arguing the people have preserved their pre-Christian traditions, and that these will form the basis of future development. In the article "Turks can participate in the revolution alongside the Bulgarians" published in 1875, Botev considered the possible participation of Turks in the revolutionary movement. While Botev usually wrote indiscriminate scorn against Turks, he argued in the article that the oppressive order of "sultans and capitalists" caused suffering for the Bulgarians and Turks. Thus, he argued if the latter abandoned their fanaticism and paid no attention to national distinctions among Bulgarians, the Bulgarians would readily accept them in the revolutionary movement. Botev and Karavelov were among the strongest opponents of autocracy, advocating mostly the principles of the French Revolution through their newspapers.

== Legacy ==
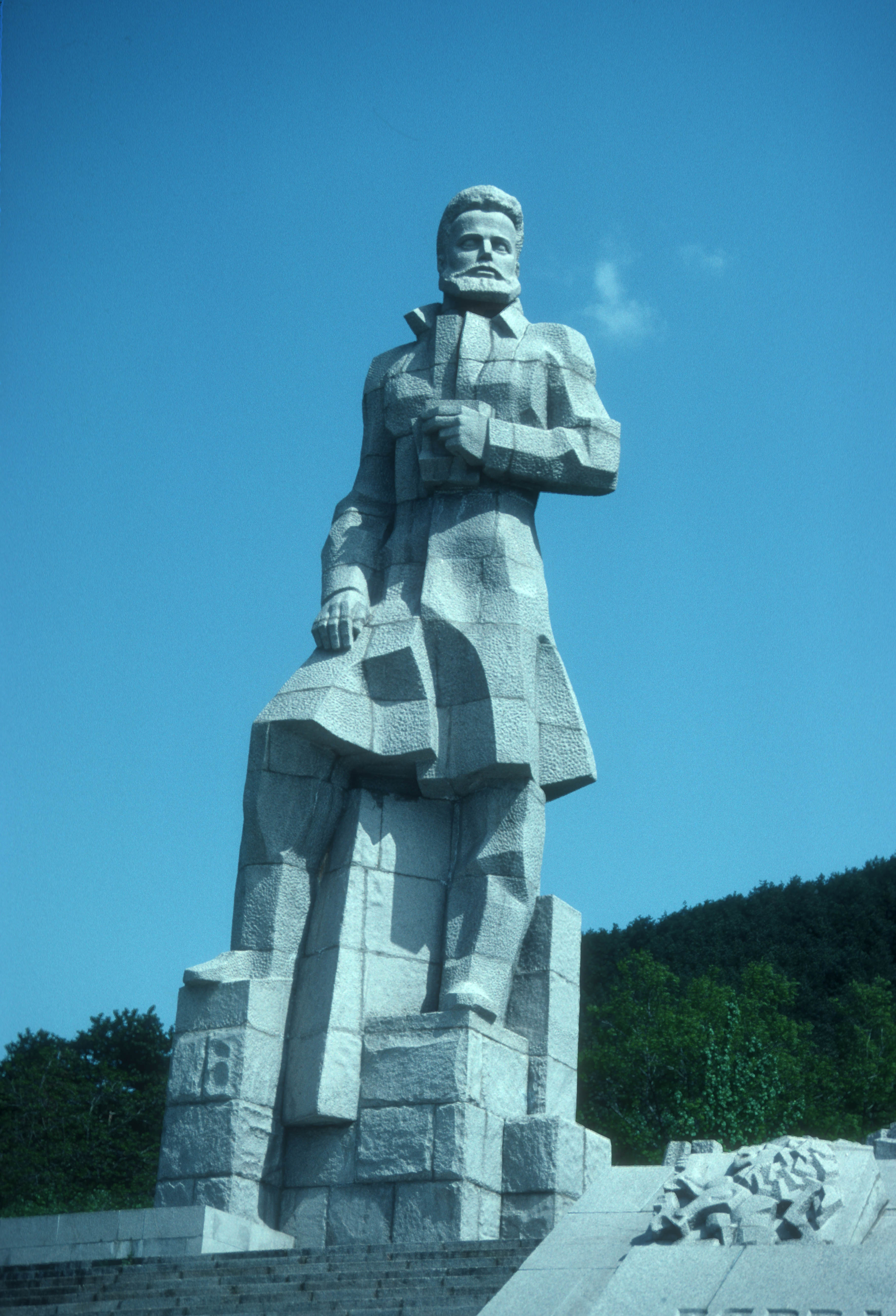
A monument of Botev in his hometown of Kalofer

In 1885, a commemoration committee was founded on the anniversary of Botev's death on 20 May/1 June. From the 1880s, Bulgarian leftists depicted Botev as a forerunner of socialist and communist ideas. In his brochure Hristo Botev from 1887, Dimitar Blagoev wrote: "Botev's views are those of a socialist, extreme socialist-revolutionary". A monument was erected on the main square of Vratsa in 1890 in the presence of Bulgarian prince Ferdinand, where the first such commemoration took place. Some of the most prominent Bulgarian political leaders of the newly established country, such as Stefan Stambolov and Zahari Stoyanov (Botev's first biographer), contributed to the creation of the myth of Botev. Stoyanov wrote: "People like Botev, with their ideals and feelings, are not under the jurisdiction of the courts, where ordinary people are judged". Within a decade, Botev became a central figure in the national pantheon of Bulgaria. His poems gained popularity after the establishment of the Bulgarian state and are part of the school curriculum, being recited on special occasions and anniversaries. The cult of Botev also began in this period. In 1891, Vazov expressed concern that Botev "enjoys a kind of absolute cult, built regrettably upon hot patriotic feeling and not upon a mature and sober estimation of his merits".

In 1901, a Bulgarian government commission examined the evidence from witnesses and concluded that Botev had died at Okolchitsa. In the 1920s, literary historian Boyan Penev called him "a saint, venerated by all sects and denominations around". The article "Where and How Did Botev Die?" was published in 1926 by Boyan Penev, professor of literary history, who relied on Stoyanov's first biography about Botev, which depicted Botev as having died at Vola.

Botev was appropriated by the Bulgarian communists before and after World War II. From the 1920s, the Bulgarian Communist Party declared 2 June as the Remembrance Day of Botev's death. In 1922, left-wing literary critic Georgi Tsanev claimed that Botev was "a defender of the slaves, trumpeter of the revolution, our first minstrel of communism". After the 1934 coup ďétat, Zveno renamed the city of Orhania to Botevgrad. In the same year, a text titled "Credo-Declaration of the Bulgarian Commune" was published and was proven to be a forgery by philologist Iliya Todorov in 1991. In 1939, a monument in his honour was placed in Okolchitsa, with a Russian Orthodox cross at its top, with the cross being replaced with a pentagram from 1947 to 1991. Bulgarian communist authorities established monuments in his honour in Sofia, Vracha and Kalofer. Schools and cultural clubs dedicated special weeks to his life, and institutions were renamed after him. On 7 January 1949, the centenary of his birthday was celebrated. On 2 June, the death of Botev and members of his band was commemorated. The underground radio station run by the Bulgarian communists in the Soviet Union was named "Hristo Botev". Per Bulgarian communist politician Vasil Kolarov, the name was chosen because of the concomitance of socialist ideals and strong patriotism. Botev was appropriated by the anarchists too. The youth anarchist-communist organisation was called "Hristo Botev". Texts by anarchists about him include "Botev as Forerunner of Anarchism in Bulgaria" and "Botev is not a Marxist". However, this was a limited view among anarchists. The highest peak of Balkan Mountains has been named Botev Peak since 1950. Botev's martyrdom was also exploited by the Bulgarian communists for the Bulgarisation of Turks in Bulgaria. English translations of all 20 poems by Botev in his poetry book were made by Thomas Butler, Peter Tempest, and Christopher Buxton. In 2006–2007, Bulgarian National Television hosted a campaign called "The Great Bulgarians", where Botev was ranked fifth. Football teams, schools and streets bear his name in Bulgaria.

Per historian Roumen Daskalov:

Hristo Botev (1847–1876) was strongly contested and admired from various quarters during his own lifetime and afterwards— contested for his fiery temper and admired for his poetic and journalistic genius. He has been portrayed variously as a social revolutionary and forerunner of Bulgarian socialism, an ardent patriot and nationalist, an indomitable rebel in the tradition of the Balkan outlaws (haiduti), a rootless cosmopolitan, and even as an irresponsible rogue and socially subversive atheist.

According to Associate Professor of Literary Theory and Comparative Literature Dimitar Kambourov:

He was loved but also feared and hated. He possessed charm and charisma but he was also direct and disdainful, uncompromising and extreme. There were concerns about the way he treated women in his life and about the motives behind his marriage. His poetry and journalism both support and subvert his mythologizing. Botev's negative attitude towards the people closest to him is particularly well registered in his poetry: relatives and friends, loved ones or brothers-in-arms, even the Bulgarian people– all fall prey to his assaults of insulting rage. All in all, Botev possessed a notoriously harsh and supercilious personality.

== Bibliography ==
- Borza, Cosmin (2019). "Decommunizing the National Poet: Post-1989 Reading of Eminescu, Botev, and Petőfi". Primerjalna Knjizevnost. 42 (2). ISSN 0351-1189.
- Bull, Lucy Catlin (1897). "Ivan Vazoff (1850 -)". In Warner, Charles Dudley (ed.). Library of the World's Best Literature. Ancient and Modern. Vol. 26. New York: R.S.Peale and J.A. Hill. pp. 15265–15266 – via Internet Archive.
- Dafinov, Zdravko (2007). Безсмъртен и гениален. Автентичният Христо Ботев (in Bulgarian). Sofia: East-West. ISBN 978-954-321-312-2.
- Daskalov, Roumen (2004). The Making of a Nation in the Balkans: Historiography of the Bulgarian Revival. Central European University Press. ISBN 9639241830.
- Danova, Sirma (2020). "Christianisation as Cultural Guilt: The Bulgarian Experience". Slavia Meridionalis. Instytut Slawistyki Polskiej Akademii Nauk.
- Montgomery, David W. (2019). Everyday Life in the Balkans. Indiana University Press. ISBN 9780253038173.
- Mineva, Emilia (2001). "On the Reception of Marxism in Bulgaria". Studies in East European Thought. doi:10.1023/A:1011210628290.
- Methodieva, Milena B (2021). Between Empire and Nation: Muslim Reform in the Balkans. Stanford University Press. ISBN 9781503613379.
- Moser, Charles A. (2019). A History of Bulgarian Literature 865–1944. De Gruyter. ISBN 9783110810608.
- Kosev, Dimitar; Natan, Zh.; Burmov, Al, eds. (1961). История на България (in Bulgarian) (1st ed.). Sofia: Наука и изкуство. OCLC 18145408.
- Kambourov, Dimitar (2017). "Hristo Botev: The Ekstasis of Non-Belonging and the Route to Modernity". Arcadia. 52 (1): 51–73. doi:10.1515/arcadia-2017-0004.
- Perry, Duncan (1993). Stefan Stambolov and the Emergence of Modern Bulgaria, 1870–1895. Duke University Press. ISBN 0-8223-1313-8.
- Pencev, Boyko (2010). "Hristo Botev and the Necessity of National Icons". In Cornis-Pope, Marcel; Neubauer, John (eds.). History of the Literary Cultures of East-Central Europe: Junctures and disjunctures in the 19th and 20th centuries. Comparative History of Literatures in European Languages. Vol. IV. John Benjamins Publishing Company. doi:10.1075/chlel.xxv.10pen. ISBN 978-90-272-3458-2.
- Stamatopoulos, Dimitris (2021). Imagined Empires: Tracing Imperial Nationalism in Eastern and Southeastern Europe. Central European University Press. ISBN 978-963-3861-783.
- Sygkelos, Yannis (2011). Nationalism from the Left: The Bulgarian Communist Party During the Second World War and the Early Post-War Years. Brill. ISBN 9789004209497.
- Trencsényi, Balázs; Kopeček, Michal (2007). Discourses of Collective Identity in Central and Southeast Europe (1770–1945). Central European University Press. ISBN 978-963-7326-60-8.
- Thomas, David; Chesworth, John A. (2025). Christian-Muslim Relations. A Bibliographical History Volume 22. Central Europe (1800-1914). Brill. ISBN 9789004698918.
