= Psychological Warfare Division =

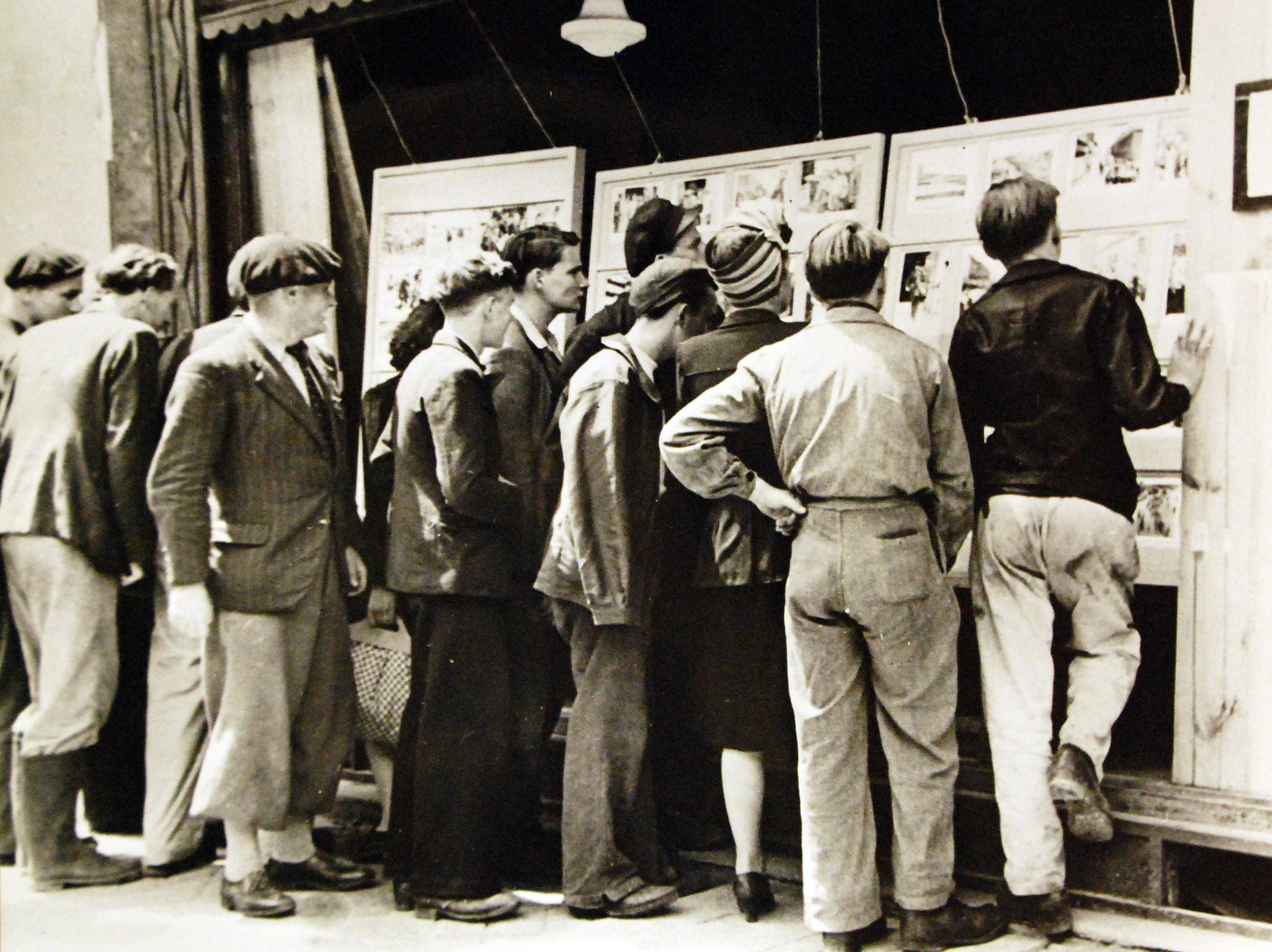
- Locals view news pictures in a PWD window in liberated Cherbourg, France in summer 1944
- Founded: November 1942
- Countries: United States; United Kingdom
- Branch: Supreme Headquarters Allied Expeditionary Force
- Type: Propaganda organization
- Role: White propaganda Psychological warfare

Commanders
- Notable commanders: Brigadier General Robert A. McClure

The Psychological Warfare Division of Supreme Headquarters Allied Expeditionary Force (PWD/SHAEF or SHAEF/PWD) was a joint Anglo-American organization set-up in World War II tasked with conducting (predominantly) white tactical psychological warfare against German troops and recently liberated countries in Northwest Europe, during and after D-Day. It was headed by US Brigadier-General Robert A. McClure (who had previously commanded the Psychological Warfare Branch (PWB/AFHQ) of U.S. General Dwight D. Eisenhower's staff for Operation Torch). The Division was formed from staff of the US Office of War Information (OWI) and Office of Strategic Services (OSS) and the British Political Warfare Executive (PWE).

The Division used radio and leaflet propaganda to undermine German soldiers' morale; with the bulk of the aerial propaganda leaflets being printed in the United Kingdom and a dedicated Special Leaflet Squadron of the US 8th Air Force disseminating the leaflets from its base in Cheddington, south-east England. Tactical Combat propaganda teams were also attached to the Army Groups to produce leaflets in the field on mobile printing presses for shell firing over the front line and to conduct loudspeaker operations to talk enemy soldiers into surrendering. PWD operated the Voice of SHAEF radio station as well as taking over Radio Luxembourg.

'Black propaganda' continued to be controlled by the Political Warfare Executive's Sefton Delmer.

== Historical context ==
=== History of psychological warfare in WWII ===
On July 11, 1941, the Office of the Coordinator of Information (COI) was created in Washington under Roosevelt, with Colonel William J. Donovan as the first director. This office was later separated into the Office of Strategic Services (OSS) and the Overseas Branch and the Office of War Information (OWI). These two offices were the first attempt at the establishment of an organized effort to promote espionage, propaganda, subversion, and any related activities under a centralized agency.

On the British side, the most coordinated effort for psychological warfare was the Political Intelligence Department (PID). In Fall of 1942, after the COI was split into OSS and OWI, the PID agreed to issue a Joint Psychological Warfare Directive to combine efforts of the psychological warfare agencies in Britain and America. This Joint Directive remained the most prominent policy of the PWD until the end of its operations in July 1945.

In November 1942, the Psychological Warfare Branch (AFHQ) was created as a joint military-civilian Anglo-American psychological warfare unit under the order of then General Dwight D. Eisenhower, attached to the Allied Force Headquarters after the Allied forces landed in French North Africa. After much trial and error with the structure and organization of the branch, it was transformed into the more coherent, and larger structure of the Psychological Warfare Division, Supreme Headquarters Allied Expeditionary Force (PWD/SHAEF) in February 1944.

=== PWD/SHAEF ===
SHAEF remained the headquarters of the Commander of Allied Forces in northwest Europe, from late 1943 until the end of World War II on September 2, 1945, under the command of General Dwight D. Eisenhower. The goals of the PWD were to:

1. Wage psychological warfare against the enemy
2. Use various media to sustain the morale of people of friendly nations occupied by the enemy
3. Conduct propaganda directed toward a military force and designed to ensure compliance with the instructions of the commander of the occupying force
4. Control information services in Allied-occupied Germany

The Publicity and Psychological Warfare Division (G-6) under Brig. Gen. Robert A. McClure was initiated by SHAEF in February 1944. McClure's original role was to coordinate all Allied press and psychological warfare agencies in northwest Europe. However, it ended up being split into two divisions just two months later. Psychological Warfare moved under the auspices of General McClure and Public Relations was under Col. Justus Baldwin Lawrence.

There were two categories of propaganda used: combat and strategic. Combat propaganda was tactical propaganda conducted in forward areas and toward smaller populations immediately behind enemy lines. Strategic propaganda sought to further more long-term, directed goals.

== Leaflet propaganda front ==
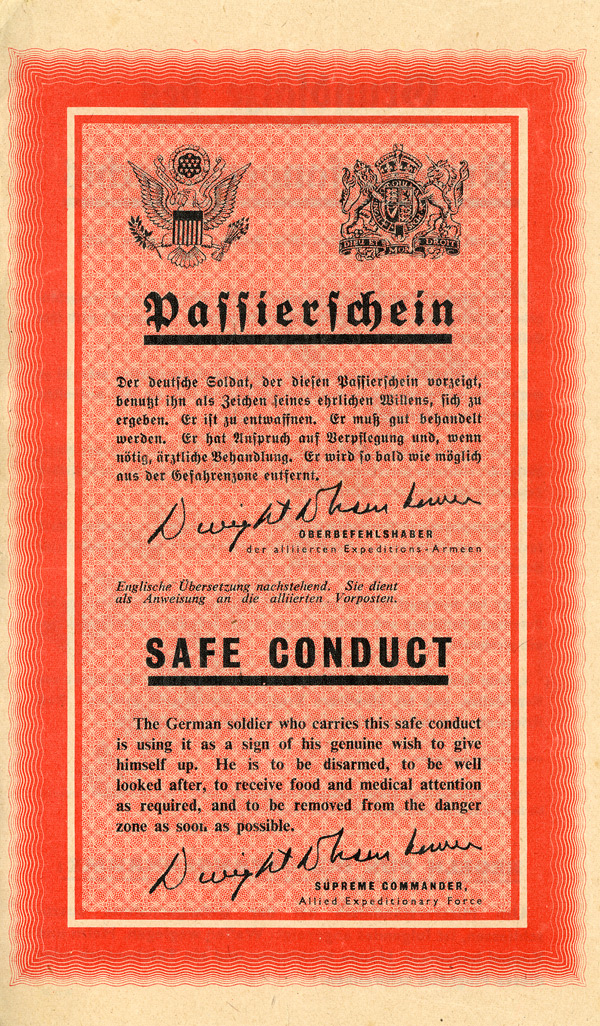
A Safe Conduct Pass. Many German soldiers surrendering waved copies of this leaflet, treating it as an official document that promised good treatment. The reverse listed various points from the Geneva and Hague Conventions on treatment of prisoners of war.

Various kinds of leaflets were used throughout the operation. The most common leaflet came in the form of single flyers promoting one specific message. However, airborne newspapers were considered the most effective propaganda. The PID produced weekly newspapers “COURRIER DE L’AIR,” ("air courier") soon followed by an American equivalent, “L’AMERIQUE EN GUERRE” ("America at war"). They each consisted of four leaflet units, intended to keep the citizens of occupied France aware of the progress of the Allies. Later, other similar papers were produced for the people of other occupied countries, including “STERNENBANNER” ("Stars and Stripes") which was disseminated in Germany.

Propaganda was separated into three categories. “White” propaganda had its source clearly indicated, such as was the case with the “L’AMERIQUE EN GUERRE.” “Black” propaganda was used to cause the audience to believe the source was something other than what it really was. Finally, “gray” propaganda did not cite who was endorsing the message—this was the case in the daily paper “NACHRICHTEN FÜR DIE TRUPPE,” ("news for the troops) produced for German garrisons along the Atlantic Wall.

"SAFE conduct passes" were also created by the PWD. These passes display Eisenhower's signature, and provided instructions for German soldiers on how to surrender. Oftentimes, the other side of the leaflet contained more immediate news or a tactical message.

Overall, the leaflets aimed to reach two main audiences. The news directed toward the people of friendly, occupied countries came across in newspapers such as the “COURIER DE L’AIR,” and “L’AMERIQUE EN GUERRE.” In addition, leaflets were disseminated to inform citizens of how to react to dire circumstances, such as the invasion of Normandy. There were also leaflets produced for enemies, including German troops and civilians, and as time went on, foreign workers and prisoners of war in Germany. A four-language newspaper was distributed each night by SHAEF, and transmitted the Supreme Commander's instructions to the various displaced persons in Germany. According to the PWD/SHAEF, the leaflets were not argumentative, but instead were created to be objective and factual.

Leaflet writing was done by the OWI and PID “in consultation with the PWD deputies, members of the Plans and Directives Section, members of the Leaflet Section, and the PWD G-2 and G-3 liaison officers.” Leaflets were written, keeping in mind the ever-changing military situation, the morale of the intended audience, production schedules, and distribution. Yet, the overall goal of the leaflets was to provide the “hard news of the military situation” and the “wishes of the supreme commander.” The agency of the special leaflet squadron was used to disseminate leaflets. Between 1944 and 1945, the Eighth Air Force distributed 80 percent of all leaflets in the areas of the Anglo-American armies. Ten percent was disseminated by the Royal Air Force, 5 percent by fighter bombers of the tactical air forces, and 5 percent by artillery (field guns and howitzers).

The 422nd Bomb Squadron of the Eighth Air Force originally released leaflets from large boxes of a Boeing B-17 Flying Fortress flying at 30,000 feet. They took into account the 60 mph winds (e.g. releasing leaflets over Brussels in order for them to land near Paris). The boxes used for this mission were converted luggage carriers obtained from the Air Transport Command. The smallest quantity of leaflets that could be released at one time using this method was about 350,000. Though this method of dissemination was large scale, it did not facilitate accuracy of where the leaflets would land.

=== Leaflet bombs ===
On February 4, 1944, the first leaflet “bomb” was tested. The bombs were created with cardboard M-17 containers, equipped with mechanical time fuses. Each container contained approximately 80,000 leaflets, and they were released from 10,000 feet. This method of dissemination was deemed a vast improvement from previous, and was generally implemented thereafter. Future directives of the United States Strategic Air Forces required the depot in Bedfordshire, England to produce 1,000 bombs per month and that aircraft be loaded with leaflets to be dispatched with each mission conducted over Germany.

=== Leaflet shells ===
Leaflets were rolled and inserted into shells to be launched via artillery—specifically howitzer guns. The 105mm shell carried 500 leaflets, while the 155mm shell carried 1500 leaflets.

== Filming ==
The director Alexander Mackendrick, who later went on to enjoy considerable success at Ealing Studios, had some of his earliest experience of working in film with the division. John Huston and Eric Ambler, as a token British representative, also made a film for the PWD about civilian Italy under its new conquerors. The Italian-Swiss documentary Giorni di gloria (1945), co-directed by Giuseppe De Santis, Luchino Visconti, Marcello Pagliero and film editor Mario Serandrei, was also made with collaboration of the PWD Film Division.

== See also ==
- Information Research Department
- Psychological warfare
- Airborne leaflet propaganda
- Office of War Information
- German Concentration Camps Factual Survey

== Bibliography ==
- The Psychological Warfare Division, Supreme Headquarters, Allied Expeditionary Force: An account of its operations in the Western European campaign, 1944-1945. 1945 – via Ike Skelton Combined Arms Research Library Digital Library. Modern reprint available here
- Publicity and Psychological Warfare 12th Army Group, 1943-1945. United States Army. 1945.
- Lerner, Daniel (1971). Psychological Warfare Against Nazi Germany - The Sykewar Campaign, D-Day to VE-Day. M.I.T. Press. ISBN 0-262-12045-3.
