= Deutscher Kurzwellensender Atlantik =

British propaganda radio station during World War II

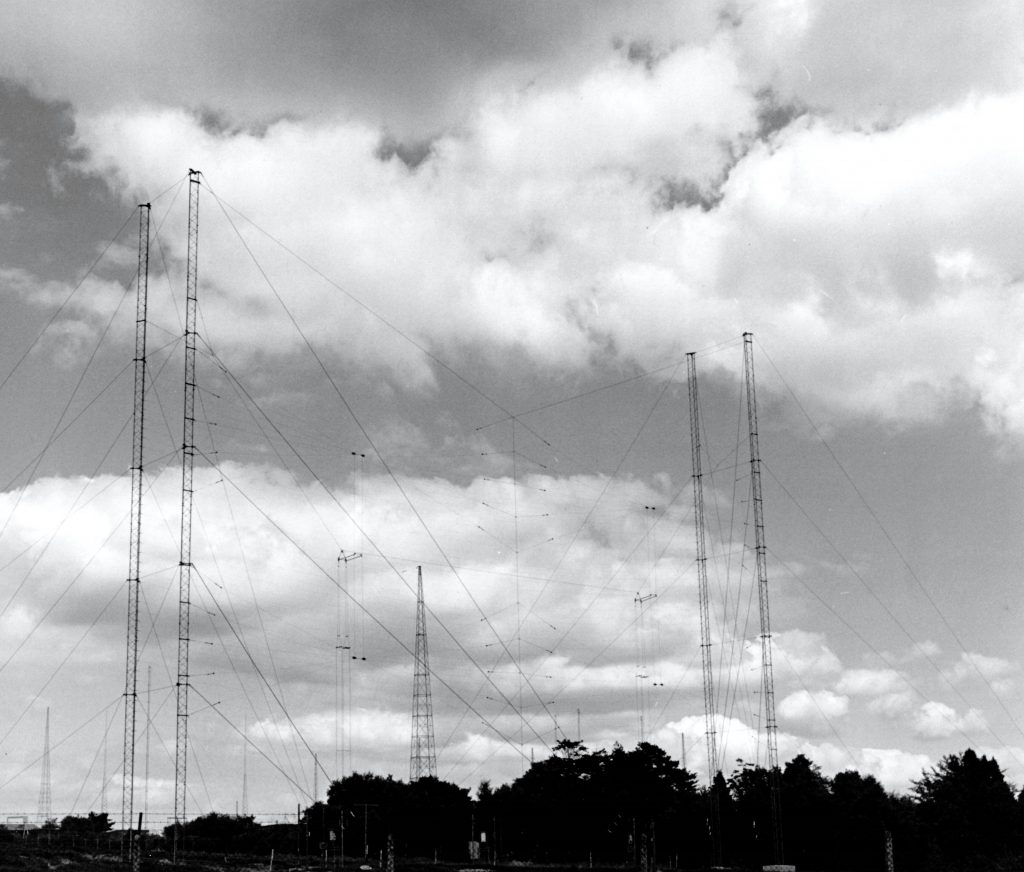
The Aspidistra antennas

The Deutscher Kurzwellensender Atlantik (German: "German Shortwave Radio Atlantic", popularly known as Atlantiksender – "Atlantic Channel"), was a British propaganda radio station operational during the Second World War. The station was the idea of the Political Warfare Executive's Sefton Delmer and broadcast from the Aspidistra in Sussex, England, between 1943 and 1945. The radio station's transmission signal was strong enough to be received in all the Atlantic Ocean, and thus reach its intended audience, German submariners. The station broadcast popular dance music sourced from Germany and the US, as well as detailed news from Germany. Atlantiksender focused primarily on aspects that would tend to reduce the morale of the submariners in the Kriegsmarine and to try and convince them that the Allies knew everything about their daily and overall military operations and strategies.

== Establishment ==
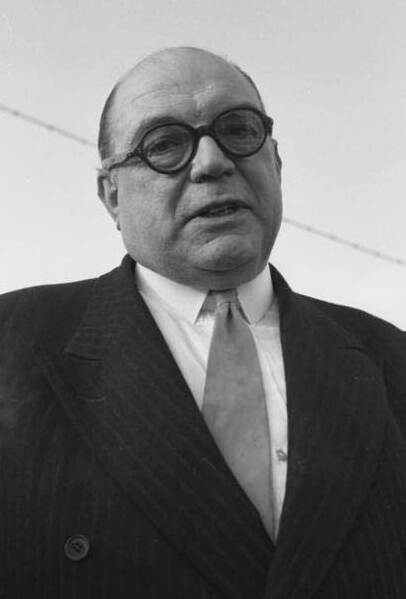
Delmer, pictured in 1958

Deutscher Kurzwellensender Atlantik was led by Sefton Delmer, the Daily Express's former Berlin correspondent, for the British government's Political Warfare Executive (PWE). Delmer had conceived of a propaganda station broadcasting to German sailors in late 1942 and sought permission from Donald McLachlan, head of the Naval Intelligence Division's propaganda sub-section NID 17z, during an alcohol-heavy luncheon around Christmas. The idea was then championed by the PWE's head R. H. Bruce Lockhart.

== Operation ==
Delmer received permission to use Aspidistra, a large antenna array near Maresfield, Sussex, that had been built by the Radio Corporation of America. Although Delmer's account has the station start broadcasting on 5 February 1943, it actually began on 22 March. It broadcast between 6 pm and 8 am daily on a number of shortwave channels including 6210, 9545 and 9760. The Aspidistra antenna broadcast a powerful 700-kilowatt signal that allowed it to be picked up far into the Atlantic Ocean, reaching even the eastern coast of the United States. Delmer also used Aspidistra to broadcast Soldatensender Calais, a similar station aimed at German ground forces in Europe. The station has been categorised as black propaganda, purporting to be a German radio station but broadcasting information intended to undermine German morale, and as grey propaganda, being of no stated affiliation. Its particular focus was on broadcasting to German U-boat crews.

=== Staff ===
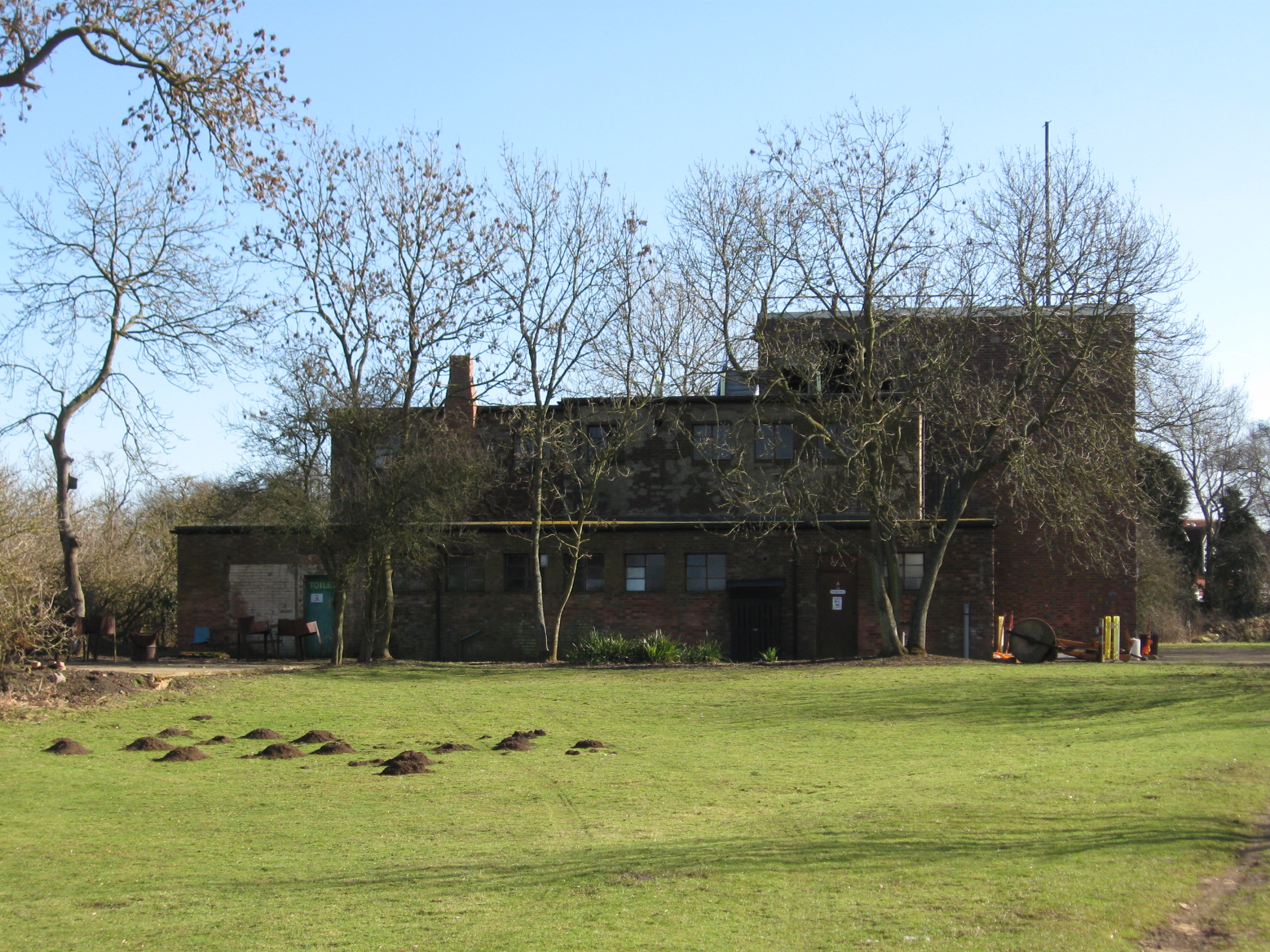
The Milton Bryan studio

To achieve his aims Delmer assembled a varied team that worked on broadcasts from a secure compound at Milton Bryan in Bedfordshire. This included classicist and intelligence agent Courtenay Edward Stevens who had devised the "V for Victory"/Beethoven's Fifth Symphony motif for overt Allied broadcasts. Muriel Spark also worked for the station and drew on the experience for her 1973 novel The Hothouse by the East River. The German-born actress Agnes Bernelle provided an attractive female voice for the station under the name "Vicky".

Delmer sought to make the station as believable as possible, including using fluent German speakers and the latest in German military jargon. To achieve this, some of the staff were German defectors, including Otto John, Richard Wurmann, Hans Walter Zech-Nenntwich and Wolfgang Gans zu Putlitz. Delmer sought recruits from prisoners of war (POWs) held in Britain as these men would have knowledge of military jargon, operating procedures, and the concerns of the German sailors. Such men worked at the station but remained, technically, prisoners. German staff of the station worked under an alias preventing them from being identified and so allowing them to return home after the war without recrimination.

=== News reporting ===
The station provided up-to-date German news flashes, provided by NID 17z. This included rebroadcasting of news gathered from official German radio stations monitored by the BBC and taken from a still-active teleprinter left behind at the Deutsches Nachrichtenbüro news bureau at the start of the war. The Air Ministry provided details of Allied bombing raids on Germany which were often reported in graphic and elaborate detail. The news also contained reports from Allied and neutral countries about the good treatment provided to German deserters. A typical news item was "gallant doctors battle diphtheria in German children's camps", ostensibly a good-news story about hard-working doctors but intended to worry sailors about conditions back home.

Items of a more personal nature were also broadcast, such as the results of football matches between U-boat crews at their base in Saint Nazaire, including the personal nicknames of players. A former bookseller, Frank Lyndner, kept a database of personal details taken from German prisoner-of-war letters to allow the station to announce births, deaths and marriages, transfers, promotions and medals relating to the U-boat service. Fluent German speaker and later BBC journalist Charles Wheeler toured POW camps to gather personal stories about bars and brothels to include in broadcasts.

=== Music ===
To make the station attractive to listeners it broadcast the latest in popular dance music, under the direction of head disc jockey Alexander Maass. The latest German records were flown in from Stockholm by quick RAF de Havilland Mosquito aircraft. Popular American records were provided by the Office of Strategic Services, a US intelligence agency. Henry Zeisel's band provided in-house music for the station; the bandsmen had been captured while providing entertainment to the Afrika Korps in North Africa. Additional music was provided by the band of the Royal Marines. The German-born singer Marlene Dietrich sang some German songs for broadcast on what, she was told, was a US-run Voice of America station.

== Impact ==
Most German listeners recognised that the station was of Allied origin but continued listening due to the quality of its broadcast material and preferred it to German propaganda stations. The news reported by the station had wide credibility among its German listeners. The level of detail reported was intended to demonstrate that British intelligence knew so much about German operations that it was pointless for captured Germans to withhold anything during interrogation. In one instance, British intelligence noticed an increase in German naval activity in the Gironde region and guessed it might involve an attempt for vessels to break out to the Far East; this information was passed to the station, which played a special programme of Japanese and Chinese music. A Luftwaffe pilot captured used the incident as an example of why there was no point in keeping secrets from his British interrogators.

The station broadcast an appeal to the U-boats to "Schluß zu machen" (put an end to it) on 29 April 1945, in the final days of the war in Europe, but this was unsuccessful.
