= Aspidistra (transmitter) =

British military radio transmitter

Coordinates: 51°2′33.70″N 0°6′15.15″E

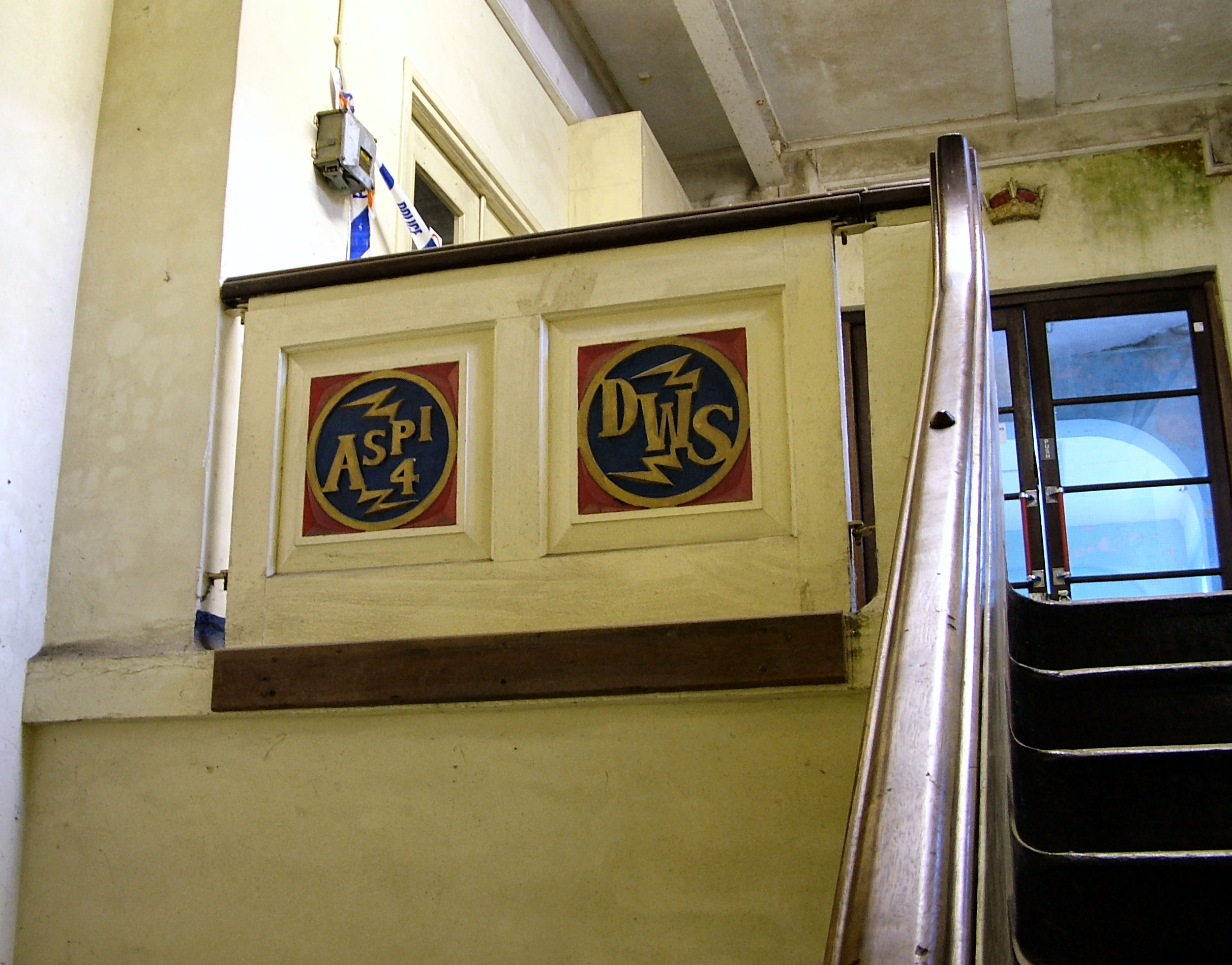
ASPI 4 and DWS logos in one of the remaining buildings

Aspidistra was a British medium-wave radio transmitter used for black propaganda and military deception purposes against Nazi Germany during World War II. At times in its history it was the most powerful broadcast transmitter in the world. Its name – after the popular foliage houseplant – was inspired by the 1938 comic song "The Biggest Aspidistra in the World", best known as sung by Gracie Fields.

The transmitter was installed in 1942 at a purpose-built site near Crowborough on Ashdown Forest in southeast England. This was equipped with other medium-wave and short-wave transmitters, which also used the Aspidistra name, being known as ASPI 2, ASPI 3, ASPI 4, etc. However, when the name Aspidistra was used on its own it always referred to the original medium-wave transmitter (ASPI 1).

The Crowborough station was run during the war by the British government's Political Warfare Executive (PWE).

After the war, the station was run by the Diplomatic Wireless Service (DWS) and used for BBC External Service broadcasts to Europe. It closed in 1982.

== Equipment and location ==
Aspidistra broadcast on medium wave (AM) with 600 kW of power. The transmitter (originally 500 kW) had been built by RCA for WJZ radio in Newark, New Jersey, United States. But at the prompting of the United States Congress, spurred on by competition, the Federal Communications Commission later imposed a 50 kW power limit on all US stations. RCA was therefore glad to sell it overseas and British Security Co-ordination, a New York outpost of MI6, bought it for £111,801.

In addition to its high power, Aspidistra could be re-tuned quickly to a new frequency. This was of great use in its secret wartime work and was unusual for a medium wave transmitter, as they generally operated on a fixed frequency throughout their working life.

Its antenna was three guyed masts, each 110 m (360 ft) tall, directing the signal broadly eastwards. The 1940s Art Deco style transmitter building was in an underground shelter which had been excavated by a Canadian army construction unit. Power for the transmitter was supplied from two flat eight diesels with blown superchargers made by Crossley-Premier heavy oil engine. A single flywheel type alternator was used to supply the power, rated at 3190 HP, as the local electricity supply did not have the necessary capacity.

The facility was located in an elevated part of Ashdown Forest, about 195 metres (640 ft) above sea level, at King's Standing near Crowborough, East Sussex.

The RCA transmitter used three class B modulators in parallel feeding three parallel 170 kW (nominal) power amplifiers (PAs), run at 200 kW to produce 600 kW in total. The PA units were operated in class C using four GL898 valves in each PA; four were also used in each modulator. The output of these PAs used a series-combining scheme to feed the RF power into a 100 ohm co-ax line. This fed the main mast, the other two being parasitic and providing the directional element necessary as the purpose was to get the maximum signal eastwards into Europe. The GL898 valves were water/air cooled triodes utilising a three-phase heater supply and having an anode dissipation of 40 kW.

Alongside the original Aspidistra, other medium wave and short wave transmitters were installed over the years. In the later period of the station's life these included two Doherty 250 kW medium wave units, whose outputs could be combined to give 500 kW on a single frequency.

Two 100 kW short wave transmitters made by General Electric (USA) operated at the Crowborough site from 1943 until the 1980s.

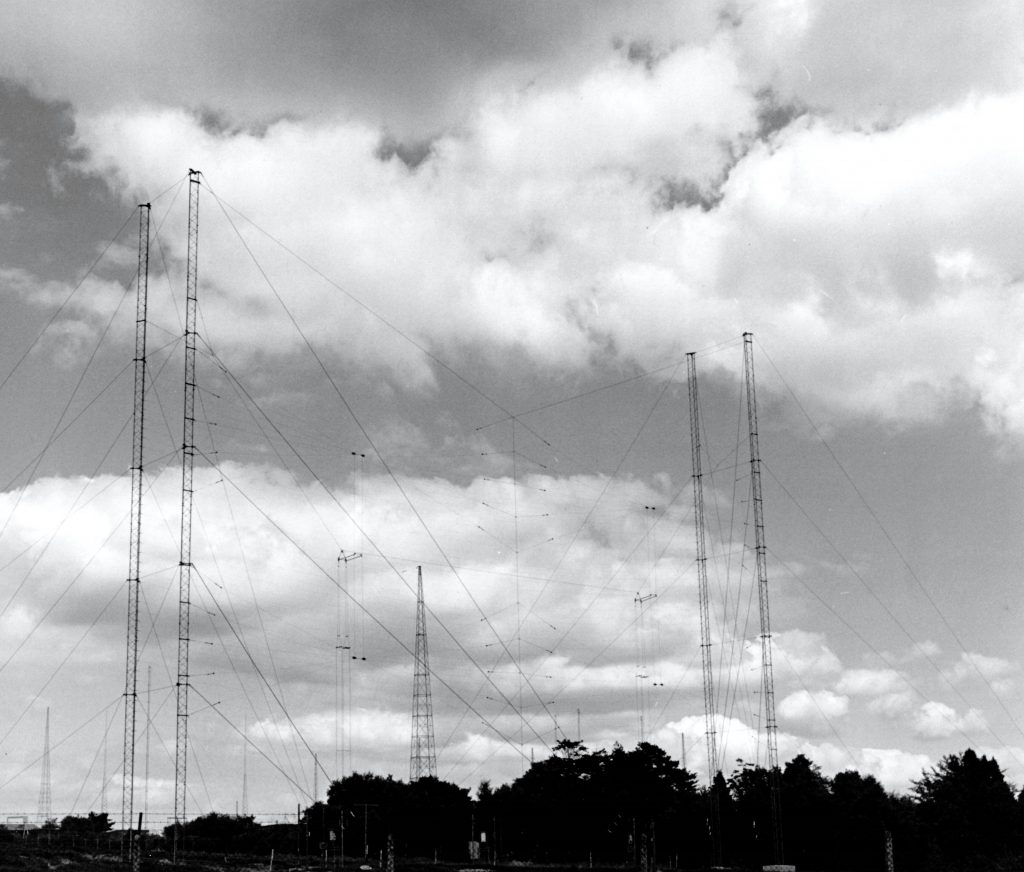
Transmitter masts in 1940s

== Power ranking ==
At times in Aspidistra's history it was the most powerful broadcast transmitter in the world, though for most of its wartime service it was less powerful than a BBC longwave transmitter at Ottringham, near Hull, which was also used for broadcasting to continental Europe and continued in service until 1953.

Aspidistra was also less powerful than Germany's Goliath transmitter, though this was used not for broadcasting but for radiotelegraphy communications with U-boats.

== Wartime operations ==
Aspidistra went into service on 8 November 1942, and was in operation throughout the remainder of the war.

=== Impersonation ===
Starting in 1943, Aspidistra was used to disrupt German night fighter operations against Allied bombers over Germany.

German radar stations broadcast the movements of the bomber streams en route to targets during RAF Bomber Command's Battle of Berlin. As part of their strategies to misdirect the German fighters, German-speaking RAF operators impersonated these German ground control operators, sending fake instructions to the night fighters. They directed the night fighters to land or to move to the wrong sectors. This interference to enemy RT and WT was known as "Dartboard". As German operational procedures changed to prevent impersonation so the British copied them, bringing in WAAFs when the Germans used female operators.

=== Black propaganda ===
Aspidistra was also used for black propaganda operations, in which the propaganda material is issued from a disguised source. These activities were under the Political Warfare Executive, and directed by Sefton Delmer.

In particular, Aspidistra aired the broadcasts of Atlantiksender and Soldatensender Calais, which posed as official German military radio stations in France.

=== Intrusion operations ===
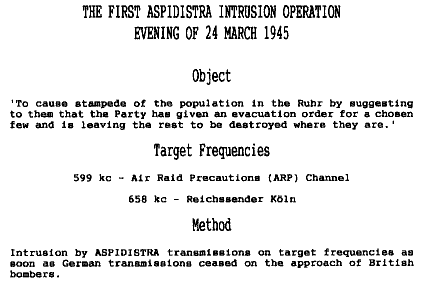
Operations order for the first "intrusion operation".

During Allied air raids, German radio transmitters in target areas were switched off to prevent their use as navigational aids by the enemy. However, such transmitters were very often connected into a network, and broadcast the same content as other transmitters which were not switched off.

When a targeted transmitter switched off, Aspidistra began transmitting on its frequency, initially retransmitting the German network broadcast as received from an active station. This would cause German listeners to believe the original station was still broadcasting. Aspidistra operators would then insert demoralizing false content and pro-Allied propaganda into the broadcast. This content was considered especially effective, as it appeared to be coming from official German sources.

These intrusion operations were an early example of a "man in the middle attack".

The first such intrusion was carried out on 25 March 1945. On 30 March 1945 Aspidistra intruded on the Berlin and Hamburg stations, warning that the Allies were trying to spread confusion by sending false telephone messages from occupied towns to unoccupied towns. On 8 April 1945 "Aspidistra" intruded on the Hamburg and Leipzig stations to warn of forged banknotes in circulation. On 9 April 1945 there were announcements encouraging people to evacuate to seven bomb-free zones in central and southern Germany. All these announcements were false.

German radio stations tried announcing "The enemy is broadcasting counterfeit instructions on our frequencies. Do not be misled by them. Here is an official announcement of the Reich authority." However, Aspidistra broadcasts included similar announcements, leaving the listeners confused.

== Post-war operations ==
Although mainly intended for the military and propaganda transmissions described above, Aspidistra was also used during the war for BBC European Service broadcasts on 804 kHz.

After 1945, Aspidistra continued to be used by the BBC. Frequencies used by the original transmitter and, in later years, by the Doherty transmitters at the site mentioned above, included:

- 1122 kHz (1945–1950)
- 1340 kHz (1950–1962)
- 647 kHz (1950–1978), but only at times when the BBC Third Programme (after 1967, Radio 3) was not using the frequency; this greatly reduced Aspidistra's use of 647 kHz after the Third Programme expanded its broadcasting hours in 1964
- 1295 kHz (1962–1978)
- 809 kHz (1967–1978), but only at times of day when it would not interfere with BBC transmissions on that frequency in Scotland
- 1088 kHz (1972–1978)

After a Europe-wide reorganisation of the medium wave band in 1978, Aspidistra only used 648 kHz, though it was able to do so without the previous restriction on its hours as the channel was no longer shared with Radio 3.

After the November 1978 reorganisation, the other medium wave frequency (1296 kHz) used by the BBC to broadcast to Europe was carried by the Doherty transmitters which had been moved to a new Foreign Office transmitting station at Orfordness on the Suffolk coast, as it was better placed than Crowborough, which is inland. In September 1982, Orfordness also took over responsibility for transmissions on 648 kHz.

In 1970, under a swap agreement between the BBC External Service and the Voice of America, there was a daily one-hour exchange of airtime at Crowborough. From 2100 to 2200 GMT/UTC, 1295 kHz carried VOA English while the BBC's Italian Service was carried by the VoA transmitter in Munich, Germany on 1196 kHz. The Crowborough station was also used to a limited extent to relay broadcasts by Radio Canada International.

Despite its almost exclusive post-war use by the BBC, the Crowborough station remained formally in the hands of the Foreign Office (from 1968, the Foreign and Commonwealth Office, FCO), and its staff were members of the Diplomatic Wireless Service (later known as the FCO's Communications Department and then the Communications Engineering Department) rather than the BBC.

== Closure and fate ==
Aspidistra made its final transmission (on 648 kHz) on 28 September 1982, the honour of pressing the "off" key for the last time going to Harold Robin, the Foreign Office engineer who had been responsible 40 years earlier for purchasing the transmitter in the US and setting up the station at Crowborough.

The station was dismantled in 1984. Two years later, following extensive modifications, the bunker that housed the Aspidistra transmitter was commissioned by the Home Office as one of the 17 sites in England and Wales to be used as seats of regional government in the event of a nuclear attack.

From 1988, Sussex Police used parts of the site, purchasing all of it in 1996 for use as a training facility.

In 2007, Building No. 3 (known as "the cinema" because of its design similarities with pre-war Art Deco cinemas), which had once housed ASPI 3 and ASPI 6, was designated a Grade II listed structure because of its historic and architectural interest. The designation notes that it is "a remarkably intact and unaltered building through which one can understand its function as an early 1940s transmitter hall".

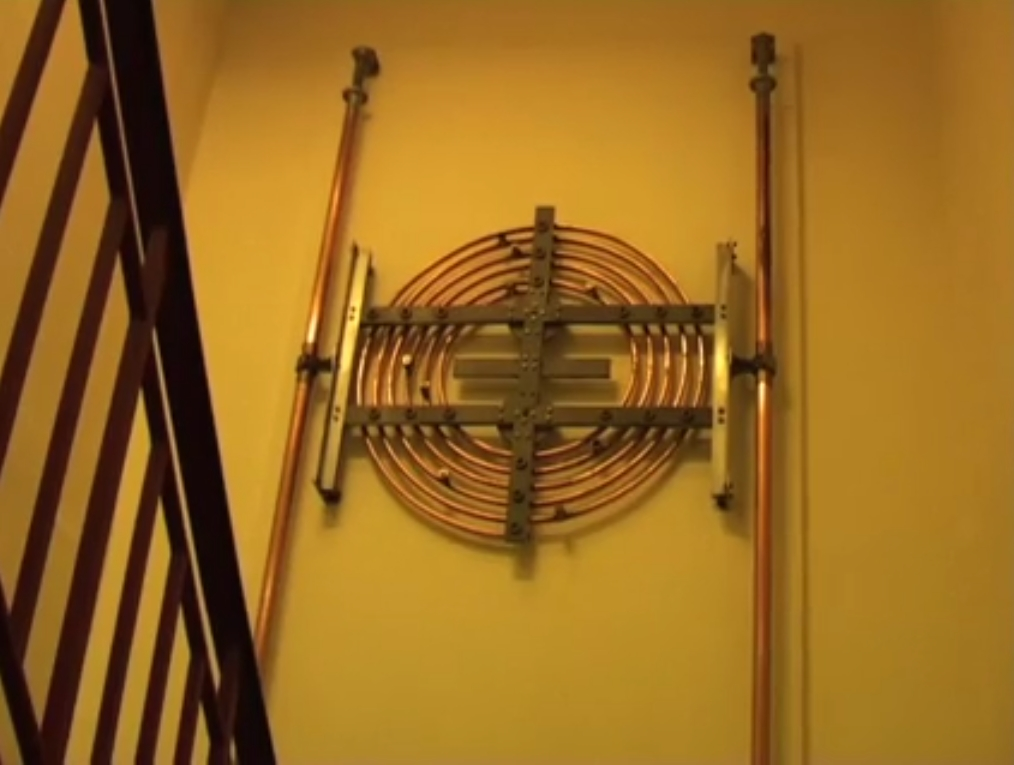
Coupling coil from the Aspidistra transmitter on display at Orfordness

A reported offer to donate the Aspidistra transmitter to London's Science Museum was not taken up and it was scrapped. A number of valves (tubes) and a large tuning coil were saved by FCO engineers and are now on display in the foyer of the Orfordness station. A notice there says:

One of three RF output coupling coils from the Aspidistra 1 transmitter at Crowborough in Sussex.

ASP1 was a 600 kW medium wave transmitter which was installed and commissioned with great urgency by Harold Robin during the spring and summer of 1942 and which commenced broadcasting on 8 November 1942. The transmitter was in continuous service for the next 40 years, carrying "black" propaganda to the enemy in wartime and BBC External Services to Europe in peacetime. It ceased regular transmissions on 28 September 1982 and its services were transferred to Orfordness. It was dismantled in May 1984.

This coil is preserved as a memento of a transmitter which played a large part in the wartime activities of the Political Warfare Executive. In peacetime it became part of the expanding broadcast transmission facilities provided for the External Services of the BBC by the Diplomatic Wireless Service – now the Communications Engineering Department of the Foreign and Commonwealth Office.

October 1984

== See also ==
- Osterloog transmitting station, the German transmitter for propaganda, in Lower Saxony (Niedersachsen)
