= Peter Bock-Schroeder =

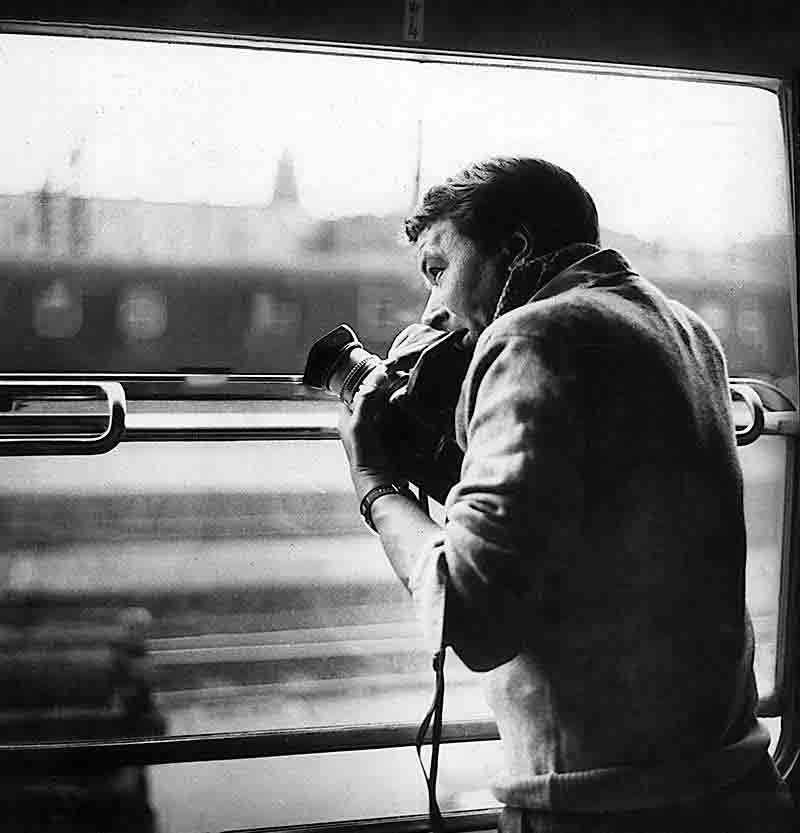
- Bock-Schroeder in 1960
- Born: November 30, 1913; Hamburg, German Empire
- Died: February 19, 2001 (aged 87); Munich, Germany
- Known for: Photography
- Website: bock-schroeder.com

Peter Bock-Schroeder (1913-2001) was a German photographer and photo journalist.

== Biography ==
Bock-Schroeder studied photojournalism at Photo-Atelier Binder in Berlin, and graduated in 1933. During World War II he served in Erwin Rommel's Afrika Corps as gunner and war correspondent. In 1946, Sefton Delmer hired him to work for the German news service. In the 1950s, he traveled extensively with contracts from leading German news magazines, Stern, Quick, and Revue. In 1956, one year after the peace treaty between Russia and Germany, Peter Bock-Schroeder was the first West-German photographer to get permission to work in the USSR. In 1962, he settled in Munich, Germany, and died on February 19, 2001.

== Early life ==
Peter Bock-Schroeder the illegitimate son of a dashing Russian expatriate and the daughter of conservative German burghers, was born in the booming port city of Hamburg on November 30, 1913. He never knew his father, who was killed after returning to his native St. Petersburg. His mother, Meta Bock, later married, gaining a husband named Schroeder as well as a measure of respectability for herself and for her son.

In 1929, at the age of 16, Bock-Schroeder moved to Berlin. Following a suggestion from a friend of his stepfather’s family, he borrowed 150 Reichsmark and enrolled in an apprentice program at the Atelier Binder photo studios. Photographers Erich Balg, Sonja Goergi, Hubs Floter, Friedrich Aschenbrauch, and Joe Niczky also trained at this studio. The apprenticeship covered the operation of a photo studio.

After months spent “retouching negatives and positives, playing the peek-a-boo clown for children’s portraits and going to buy the bread rolls for the boss,” he left the studio and enrolled at the Bräuhaus school where Balg himself taught an inspirational class. “The little technical know-how I have, I owe to him,” Bock-Schroeder wrote. “One of his school exercises was to take a photo of the Brandenburg gate as no one had ever seen it before; using only a very rudimentary camera, he wanted us to find a new way of seeing something that had already been photographed millions of times. I took my shot of it looking between the legs of the policemen there and got a good grade.”

== Pre-War Years ==
His knack for framing the familiar in interesting ways served him well during a visit to the Netherlands, where he made some life-changing discoveries. “I was fascinated by the vastness of the country,” he wrote. He returned to Berlin having not only discovered a love for landscape photography that would sustain him throughout his life. He also learned that he could earn a living by taking pictures when he sold his Netherlands photos for publication. After two years at Brauhaus, Bock-Schroeder, at the age of 18, began his professional career as a journeyman photographer, chronicling his travels through Sweden, England and Belgium. “Travel is the best education for a photographer,” he wrote. “In those wander years I was able to experiment and shoot however I felt like. I had time, there were no `musts’ and earning a living wasn’t an issue. I was married to my camera.” Of all the activities that flourished in Berlin before the lights went out on Jan. 30, 1933, when Adolf Hitler became Chancellor of Germany and the 12 years Nazi nightmare began, none was more exciting – nor more dangerous – than politics. While Nazis and Communists battled in the streets, 20-year-old Bock-Schroeder joined the Social Democratic Party (SPD). With the triumph of the right, the leftist SPD was banned, its leadership imprisoned and in many cases murdered. Detained and questioned by the Gestapo in 1933 when his name appeared on membership roles of the banned Social Democratic Party, Bock-Schroeder was ordered to work as part of the "Arbeits Dienst".

== World War II ==
When, in 1938, as the Nazi war machine geared up for the coming invasion of Poland and the state-run Kristallnacht pogrom signaled the beginning of all-out war against Germany's Jewish population, Bock- Schroeder attempted to flee to the Netherlands. He was arrested and sent back to Germany. When the war broke out on September 1, 1939, Bock-Schroeder enlisted in the Luftwaffe. During the war he served as aerial gunner and war correspondent in Erwin Rommel’s Afrika Corps. By the spring of 1945, Bock-Schroeder and fellow veterans of Rommel’s vanquished Afrika Corps were ordered to take part in a final campaign. Bock-Schroeder managed to escape the airbase near Nürnberg, and bicycled 600 kilometers to Hamburg where he surrendered to British forces in his birthplace. Peter Bock-Schroeder was imprisoned in a British POW camp.

== Post War ==
Released in the summer of 1945, he applied for employment at the fledgling German News Service (today dpa). He was hired on the spot by Sefton Delmer. Delmer was commissioned to set up the first news agency in the British zone, called the German News Service. He recruited 63 employees. Among the recruited radio operators and telex operators, interpreters, mathematicians, physicists, photographers and news assistants was Peter Bock-Schroeder. As news agency photo-journalist, Bock-Schroeder traveled throughout Allied occupied Germany and the neighboring nations of Europe. In 1949, Bock-Schroeder, then 36, was hired by “Stern Magazine” as photo journalist, and sent on assignments around the world. He also worked for “Quick Magazine” and “Revue” “Constanze” and “Jasmin”. On a Reportage in Cypress in 1949, he met his first wife, Joan (Jody)Haight Brewster. She was American, working for the Foreign Office. They moved to the U.S., but the marriage only lasted for two years. Peter Bock-Schroeder was not ready to settle down, yet. Instead he became a wanderer, photographing in North and South America, as well as Europe and the Middle East. Money had no relevance to him, but the quality of his photos guaranteed him work with all the major German magazines and newspapers.

== The Sovjets ==
In 1956, one year after the peace treaty between Russia and Germany, Peter Bock-Schroeder was the first West-German photographer to get permission to work in the USSR. The task was to travel with an international film crew on the production of the documentary: Russia today, We saw with our eyes. The film was approved by the Soviet authorities. His journey took him through the huge space of the former Soviet republics - from the oriental south to the far north, from western Russia to the Siberian east. On the eve of his departure to West Berlin, Bock-Schroeder sewed most of the exposed rolls of film into his trench coat and brought his work out of Russia into West-Berlin.

== Later career ==
During a Reportage in the South of Germany he met his second wife. They married in 1960 in Munich and had four children. Peter Bock-Schroeder continued to work for magazines and publishing houses. In 1972 he worked with Otl Aicher during the Munich Olympics, as photographer and coordinator of the international press team. At the age of 60 he signed a contract with the “Munich International Airport - Press Department”. His architectural and portrait works of that time have been published in books and magazines.

== Death and legacy ==
On February 19, 2001 Peter Bock-Schroeder died age 87 in Munich. He was surrounded by his wife, his four children and three grandchildren. Peter Bock-Schroeder’s Photographic Archive is administered and represented by the Peter Bock-Schroeder Foundation in Paris, France.
