= Gustav Siegfried Eins =

British black propaganda radio station during World War II

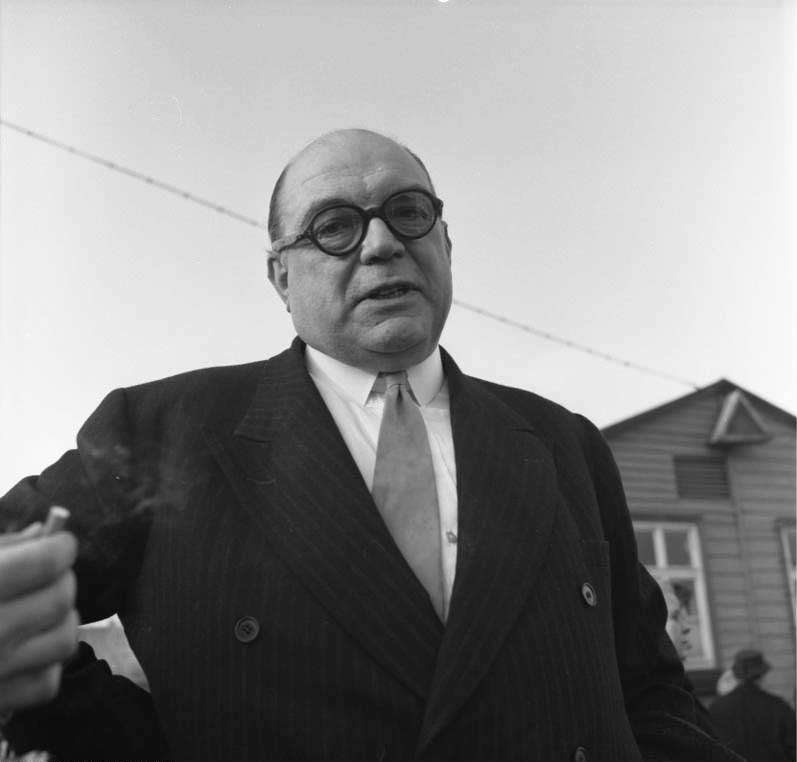
Sefton Delmer (1958)

Gustav Siegfried Eins (GS1) was a British black propaganda radio station during World War II operated by the Political Warfare Executive (PWE). It was the brainchild of Sefton Delmer, a former BBC German service announcer recruited by PWE in 1940, and claimed to be an illegal radio station operating within Nazi Germany. The callsign was based on the German Army phonetic alphabet for the letters GS, but had no meaning.

The programmes were recorded on glass disc at the Wavendon Tower studio then taken to the short wave radio stations at Signal Hill, Gawcott and Potsgrove.

== Broadcasts ==
The broadcaster was Peter Seckelmann, a refugee from Berlin, who used the name "Der Chef" and claimed to be a proud, highly patriotic Prussian officer of the old school, totally loyal to Germany. In the first Gustav Siegfried Eins broadcast, immediately after the flight of Rudolf Hess to Scotland, "Der Chef" ranted that "As soon as there is a crisis, Hess packs himself a white flag and flies off to throw himself and us on the mercy of that flat-footed bastard of a drunken old cigar-smoking Jew, Churchill!"

Most of "Der Chef's" diatribes were directed against low- and middle-ranking Nazi Party officials, the so-called Partei Kommune, which he portrayed as selfish, corrupt and sexually depraved gangsters whose behaviour shamefully contrasted with 'the devotion to duty shown by our brave troops freezing to death in Russia'.

The first broadcast was on the evening of 23 May 1941 and the final broadcast in late October 1943. The scripting ostensibly had the Gestapo storm the station and shoot Der Chef. Unfortunately, the recording engineer who played the transcription did not understand German, and played the "death" of Der Chef twice.

The station was replaced by Soldatensender Calais.

== Bibliography ==
- Black Boomerang - An Autobiography, Volume Two, (Secker & Warburg, 1962), D Sefton Delmer.
- The Black Game - British Subversive Operations Against the Germans During the Second World War, (Michael Joseph, 1982), Ellic Howe. ISBN 0-7181-1718-2
- The Secret History of PWE - Political Warfare Executive 1939-1945, (St Ermin's Press, 2002), David Garnett. ISBN 1-903608-08-2

== See also ==
- Black propaganda
- Political Warfare Executive
- Psychological warfare
