= Hans Walter Zech-Nenntwich =

Member of the SS who defected to the United Kingdom (1916–1964)

Hans Walter Zech‐Nenntwich
- Born: 10 June 1916; Thorn, Prussia, German Empire
- Spouse: 2
- Military career
- Allegiance: Germany; United Kingdom
- Branch: Waffen-SS
- Rank: Untersturmführer
- Units: 2nd SS Cavalry Regiment; 8th SS Cavalry Division Florian Geyer
- Conflicts: World War II

Hans Walter Zech‐Nenntwich (10 July 1916 – after 1964) was a member of the SS who defected to the United Kingdom after being imprisoned in 1943. After World War II he was convicted of war crimes and temporarily fled Germany before returning and surrendering himself.

== Career ==
Hans Walter Zech‐Nenntwich was born on 10 July 1916, in Thorn, Prussia, German Empire He became a member of the Nazi Party before 1933 and joined the SA. He fell out of favor after the Night of the Long Knives which purged the leadership of the SA, but later regained favor in the party.

In 1934, he became a policeman in Bonn, Germany. From 1934 to 1935, he served as an air observer in the Luftwaffe. From 1935 to 1938, he served as a non-commissioned officer for administrative functions in the Reich Labour Service. Zech-Nenntwich joined the Schutzstaffel and later served as a guard at the Sachsenhausen concentration camp.

=== World War II ===
Zech-Nenntwich was transferred from Sachsenhausen to the Mauthausen concentration camp and his unit there was later reorganized into the SS Heimwehr Danzig. From 1939 to 1940, he received training courses at the SS-Junkerschule Bad Tölz and served in the SS-Totenkopfverbände as a non-commissioned officer in Poland.

In 1941, he was transferred to the 2nd SS Cavalry Regiment where he served as a reconnaissance officer during the invasion of the Soviet Union. In 1941, he was transferred to Warsaw to serve in the SS cavalry recruit depot. From 1942 to 1943, he served in the 8th SS Cavalry Division Florian Geyer until he was transferred back to Warsaw after suffering an injury.

=== British intelligence ===
In 1943, Zech-Nenntwich was arrested for rape, but according to him it was for making contact with the Polish resistance. In March, he escaped from prison and fled to Sweden where he was employed by British military intelligence. In April, he was sentenced to death in absentia for desertion, rape, and weapons theft, and removed from the SS.

From 1944 to 1945, he served under Sefton Delmer in black propaganda campaigns under the alias of Sven Nansen. Following the end of World War II, he returned to Germany, where he interrogated prisoners of war in the British-occupation zone and later worked as a civil servant in North Rhine-Westphalia from 1945 to 1947.

== Later life ==
From 1947 to 1962, he served in multiple businesses and owned a film company and factory. In 1952, he was convicted of bribing a British civilian guard and sentenced to prison for three months. On 5 December 1952, he was given a five-week suspended sentence and a 170 DM fine for assault and slander.

On 24 September 1952, his home in Mehlem, West Germany was raided by the orders of a federal court. During the raid a letter from Zech-Nenntwich to Walter Ulbricht, leader of the Socialist Unity Party of Germany, asking for a job in East Germany was found.

=== Prison escape ===
From 1963 to 1964, he was one of the members of the 2nd SS Cavalry put on trial for mass killings of 5,200 Jews at the Pinsk Marshes. He was found guilty and sentenced to four years in prison. However, he escaped from Braunschweig Prison on 23 April after being let out by Dietrich Zeemann, a prison guard who had met Zech-Nenntwich when both of them were at a Nazi labor service school in 1936, and fled to Egypt with Margit Steinheuer, his fiancée. While in Egypt he was interviewed by a Stern reporter. The West German government attempted to extradite him from Egypt, but President Gamal Abdel Nasser refused.

On 26 July, Zech-Nenntwich returned to Germany and hid at his villa in Remagen. He later turned himself in to the Ministry of Justice of Lower Saxony on 7 August 1964, as he was afraid of being captured by Israeli agents. He was put on trial again for bribing a guard during his escape and had another 10 months added to his sentence.
