= Courtenay Edward Stevens =

British classicist

Courtenay Edward Stevens Portrait in later life

Courtenay Edward Stevens (14 April 1905 – 1 September 1976) was a British classicist. He was educated at Winchester College and received a first class degree in literae humaniores ("the Greats") from New College, Oxford. Stevens remained at Oxford after graduation, receiving scholarships and, in 1933, a research fellowship at Magdalen College. During the Second World War he worked for British military intelligence, specialising in propaganda. Stevens produced German-language newspapers and broadcasts and suggested the use of the first notes of Beethoven's Fifth Symphony for Allied broadcasts. After the war he returned to Magdalen, taking on a huge teaching workload of up to 72 hours per week. Stevens enjoyed success, in partnership with the philosopher J. L. Austin, in preparing students for examination in the Greats. He served as vice-president of the college from 1950–51.

== Education and early career ==
Stevens was born on 14 April 1905 and educated at Winchester College. He studied at New College, Oxford, from 1924, receiving the nickname "Tom Brown Stevens" by which he was afterwards known informally in academic circles. Stevens studied the literae humaniores ("the Greats") and was well regarded academically, though more for his expertise in the classics than the philosophy side (he did not get on well with his philosophy tutor H. W. B. Joseph). Stevens was awarded a first class Bachelor of Arts degree in 1928 and in August of that year received the Robinson Exhibition from Oriel College. He afterwards received a University Senior Scholarship, a Craven Fellowship and, in 1933, a research fellowship at Magdalen College.

Stevens received his MA in 1933, the same year he published Sidonius Apollinaris and his Age. Also in 1933 he was appointed a fellow and tutor at Magdalen College and began teaching students, the first of whom was A. J. Ayer, later to become a renowned philosopher. Stevens began to specialise in Romano-British and Celtic studies, for which he received advice from R. G. Collingwood and Camille Jullian. He was also one of the Inklings, an informal literary discussion group at the University that met regularly from the 1930s to the 1950s; its central members were C. S. Lewis, J. R. R. Tolkien and Charles Williams.

== Intelligence agent ==
During the Second World War Stevens worked in military intelligence, specialising in "black propaganda". He produced a series of German-language newspapers that were dropped into occupied Europe and served as an intelligence officer with Deutscher Kurzwellensender Atlantik, a broadcast aimed at German U-boat crews. It was Stevens who suggested that the four opening notes of Beethoven's Fifth Symphony, which was also "V" (for "victory") in Morse code, were used as a signature theme for Allied radio broadcasts. After the war he served briefly in the military occupation government of Germany.

== Later career ==
He returned to Magdalen after the war as an Official Fellow and tutor in ancient history. As a tutor he worked closely with the philosopher J. L. Austin in the Greats. The partnership achieved good success in preparing students for the university examinations: in 1950 five of the eight first class degrees awarded for the Greats at Oxford were to students they had tutored. Stevens also taught Roman history at New College and took in students from other colleges as well. He took on so many students that he had to hold tutorials at odd hours and locations, often teaching for 50 hours a week and at one point 72 hours. His huge teaching workload restricted his academic output. Stevens served as vice-president of Magdalen for 1950–51. One of his former pupils was Miriam Margolyes, who wrote in her memoir This Much Is True that he told her during a tutorial that he felt he "wanted to be a woman"..

Stevens was married three times, once to Leila Buckley, and had one son by his first wife. He was created an emeritus fellow in 1972. Stevens died on 1 September 1976, a memorial service was held on 20 November 1976 in the chapel of Magdalen College. Geoffrey Warnock, principal of Hertford College gave the address.
