= Carlene Roberts Lawrence =

American aviation executive

Carlene Roberts Lawrence (August 28, 1913 – October 29, 2018) was an American aviation executive.

== Early life and education ==
Lawrence was born in Water Valley, Kentucky, to Carl Dairon and Josephine (Lewis) Roberts. Following her father's death by lightning in 1913, her mother worked as a domestic worker, and the family relocated to Oklahoma in 1915. She graduated from the University of Oklahoma in 1934.

== Career ==
Lawrence began her career as a secretary at the Oklahoma City Chamber of Commerce. Her work performance led to her hiring by Braniff Airways, and she subsequently joined American Airlines in Chicago in 1938.

In 1939, Lawrence was appointed director of the housing department at American Airlines, responsible for relocating the company's general offices to LaGuardia Airport in New York. She managed the move of approximately 700 employees and their families. In 1942, she was promoted to assistant to Vice President O. M. Mosier and transferred to Washington, D.C., where she worked on securing commercial aircraft for the military during World War II and later engaged in government relations for the airline.

In 1946, American Airlines promoted her to assistant vice president, and in 1951, she became a vice president. Lawrence resigned from American Airlines in 1954 to marry Lothair Teetor, an assistant secretary of commerce. After his death in 1962, she married Justus Baldwin Lawrence in 1968.
