= Soldatensender Calais =

British black propaganda radio station during World War II

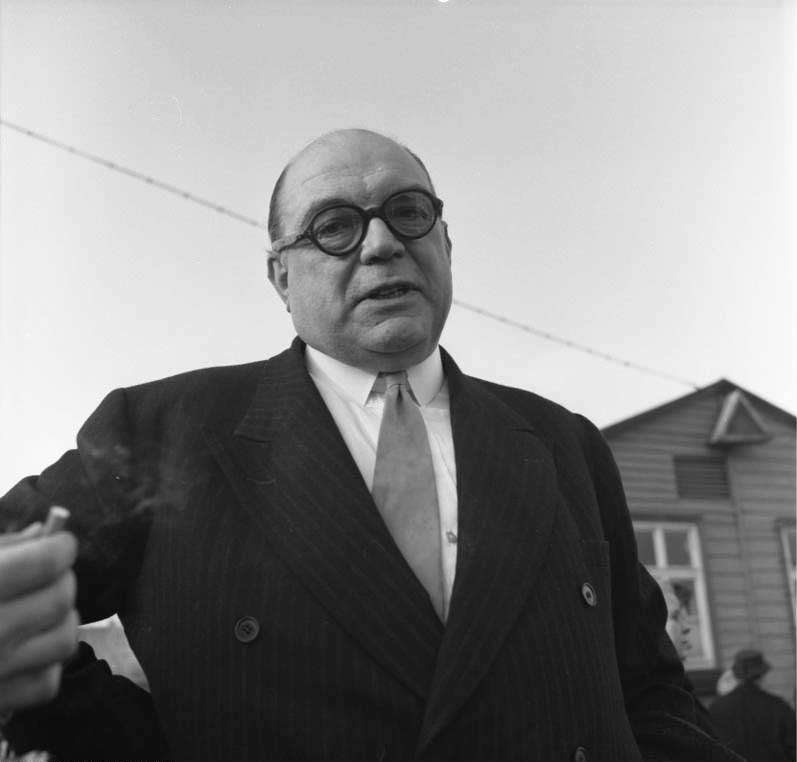
Sefton Delmer (1958)

Soldatensender Calais (G.9) (German: [zɔlˈdaːtn̩ˌzɛndɐ kaˈlɛː], Soldiers' Radio Calais) was a British black propaganda broadcaster during the Second World War operated by the Political Warfare Executive. It pretended to be a station of the German military broadcasting network. The station was in operation between 14 November 1943 and 30 April 1945, when it ceased operations.

Soldatensender Calais operated on the mediumwave band on 833 kHz (360 metres), 714 kHz (420 metres), and 612 kHz (490 metres), with an associated shortwave station Kurzwellensender Atlantik (Shortwave Station Atlantic) created to broadcast to U-boat crews. The station used a 500 kilowatt transmitter originally built for American broadcaster WJZ, in Newark, New Jersey. This transmitter had lain unused at the factory after the United States Federal Communications Commission imposed a 50 kW power limit on all U.S. stations, and so RCA was glad to sell it overseas and the British Secret Service bought it for £165,000. Codenamed Aspidistra, it was installed in a huge, underground bunker near Crowborough in Sussex, England, where it was briefly the world's largest medium wave station, perfect for deceptive "black" operation. The Nazis attempted to silence the Calais transmitter with jamming devices—with limited success. The medium-wave transmitter's performance was technically far superior to all others.

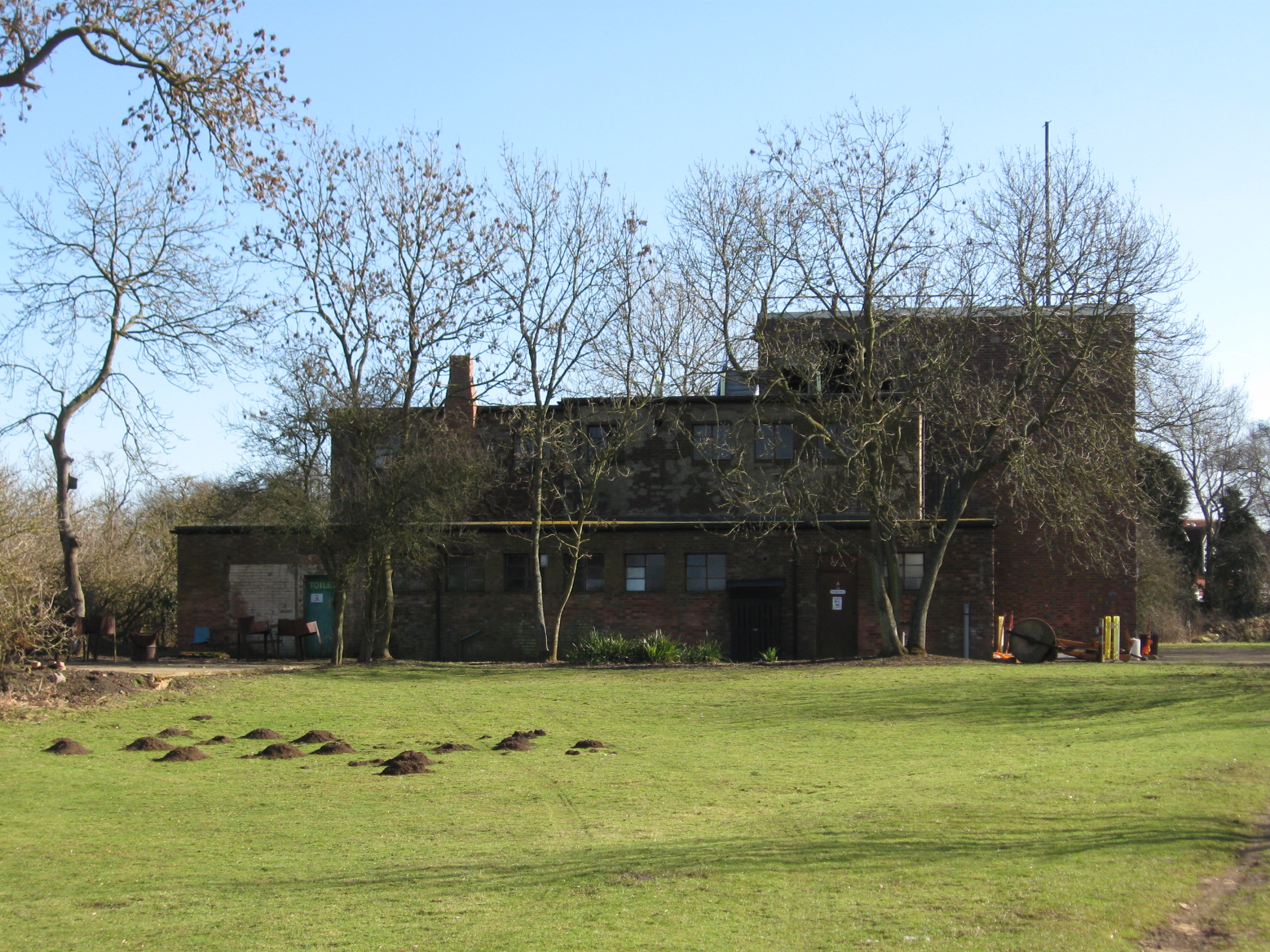
Soldatensender Calais studio, Milton Bryan

Soldatensender Calais operated from 6 p.m. local time to dawn. Unlike its predecessor Gustav Siegfried Eins, the programmes were live from the purposely-built broadcast studio at Milton Bryan in Bedfordshire and presented by Agnes Bernelle using the codename "Vicky".

The method of propaganda used by Soldatensender Calais was described by Sefton Delmer, its creator, in his book, Black Boomerang, as "cover, cover, dirt, cover, dirt"; that is, using good music and providing coverage of sports and other events of interest to a German serviceman, the station made that listener receptive to propaganda items aimed at decreasing morale. An example was a warning of confidence men swindling German soldiers being transferred from France to the Russian front. This approach could be compared to those used by Tokyo Rose and Axis Sally, without the heavy-handedness of the Axis programs. Soldatensender Calais, as part of its cover, relayed speeches by Adolf Hitler and other Nazi officials. Delmer's most important source was the German News Bureau, the official Nazi press agency, which Delmer and his team tapped into every day. They used a Hellschreiber, a teleprinter used to transmit press releases left behind in London by a German journalist before the war began. Therefore, Calais was always as up-to-date as the rest of German radio.

During the D-Day invasion of 6 June 1944, Soldatensender Calais broadcast information that was intended to impress German intelligence officers that the invasion area was wider than it actually was. After the Pas de Calais area was overrun, the station changed its callsign to Soldatensender West.

Soldatensender's broadcast was repeated in print the next day in the PWE/OSS Nachrichten für die Truppe air-dropped newspaper for German troops.

The station closed on 30 April 1945 without any official announcement.

Other clandestine radio stations operated by the Political Warfare Executive and its forerunners during the war included Das wahre Deutschland (G.1), Sender der Europäischen Revolution (G.2), Gustav Siegfried Eins (G.3), Wehrmachtssender Nord (G.5) and the German Priest (G.7) station.

The Soviet-based German People's Radio also known as Deutscher Volkssender was inspired, in part, by Soldatensender Calais. Delmer's people included, among others, the later President of the Federal Office for the Protection of the Constitution, Otto John, and the later CSU politician Karl Theodor zu Guttenberg

== See also ==
- Psychological warfare

== Bibliography ==
- Black Boomerang—An Autobiography, Volume Two, (Secker & Warburg, 1962), D Sefton Delmer.
- The Black Game—British Subversive Operations Against the Germans During the Second World War, (Michael Joseph, 1982), Ellic Howe. ISBN 0-7181-1718-2
- The Secret History of PWE—Political Warfare Executive 1939–1945, (St Ermin's Press, 2002), David Garnett. ISBN 1-903608-08-2
