= Justus Baldwin Lawrence =

American writer and public relations officer

Justus Baldwin “Jock” Lawrence (December 16, 1903 – April 21, 1987) was a writer, a public relations expert in the motion picture industry, and the U.S. Army’s chief public relations officer in Europe during part of World War II.

== Early life ==
Lawrence was a native of Akron, Ohio. He graduated from Yale University in 1927 and settled in Hollywood, California. From 1933 to 1939 he was an assistant to Samuel Goldwyn, and from 1939 to 1941 was director of public relations for the Motion Picture Producers Association.

== Military career ==
In 1942 he joined the U.S. Army and at the grade of lieutenant colonel was initially assigned to the public relations staff of Admiral Louis Mountbatten, commander of Combined Operations. In September 1943 he became Public Relations Officer (PRO) of the headquarters of the Army Service Forces-European Theater under Maj. Gen. John C. H. Lee, dealing with the many international reporters present in-theater, and getting positive stories into major publications in the United States. He was highly regarded and efficient, so much so that his work caught the eye of Theater Commanding General Dwight D. Eisenhower’s headquarters in England. In April 1944, Lawrence became chief public relations officer (PRO) for the European Theater of Operations, U.S. Army, and was promoted to colonel. For unknown reasons he left the service and returned to the U.S. in October 1944, according to the private papers of Lt. Gen. Lee. He was replaced as SHAEF-PRO by Brig. Gen. Frank A. Allen. Jr.

After the war Lawrence became an executive of the J. Arthur Rank Corporation (a British movie studio) in the New York City office. In 1951 he returned to military service and was public relations officer at Dwight D. Eisenhower’s headquarters at NATO until 1952. He later started his own public relations firm, J.B. Lawrence, Inc., at which he worked until he retired.

Lawrence married, first, Mary Peace, who died in the early 1960s. His second wife, Carlene, was an airline executive. There were no children from either marriage.

== Publications ==
“Include Me In,” about Hollywood and Sam Goldwyn
“You Can't Shoot an Empty Gun,” about his World War II experiences
