= Political Warfare Executive =

British clandestine organization

- PWE Shoulder Title
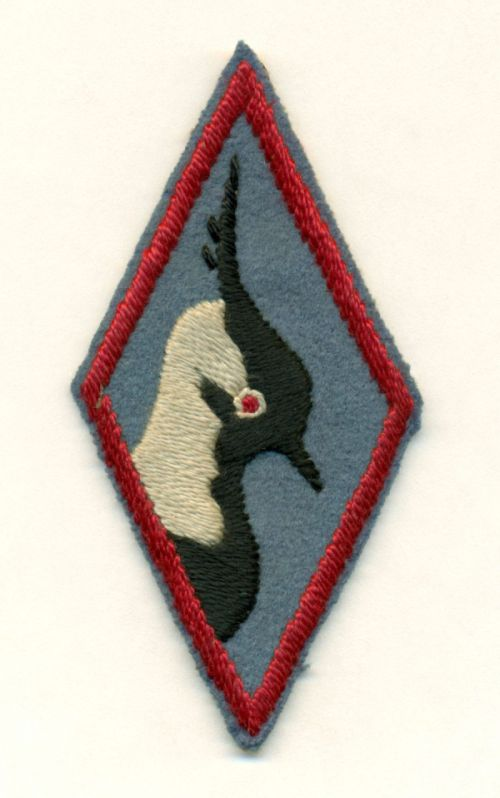
- The shoulder badge or title, showing a peewit, was worn on the left sleeve of uniformed members of the Political Warfare Executive (PWE) during WWII.
- Predecessor: SO1
- Successor: Political Intelligence Department
- Established: 1941
- Founded at: Great Britain
- Dissolved: 1945

During World War II, the Political Warfare Executive (PWE) was a British clandestine body created to produce and disseminate both white and black propaganda, with the aim of damaging enemy morale and sustaining the morale of countries occupied or allied with Nazi Germany.

== History ==
The Executive was formed in August 1941, reporting to the Foreign Office. The staff came mostly from SO1, which had been until then the propaganda arm of the Special Operations Executive. The organisation was governed by a committee initially comprising Anthony Eden (Foreign Secretary), Brendan Bracken (Minister of Information) and Hugh Dalton (Minister of Economic Warfare), together with officials Rex Leeper and Dallas Brooks, and Robert Bruce Lockhart as chairman (and later Director General). Roundell Palmer (the future 3rd Earl of Selbourne) later replaced Dalton when he was moved to become President of the Board of Trade. Ivone Kirkpatrick, an advisor to the BBC and formerly a diplomat in Berlin, also joined the committee, while Leeper left to become British Ambassador to Greece.

PWE included staff from the Ministry of Information, the propaganda elements of the Special Operations Executive, and from the BBC. Its main headquarters was at Woburn Abbey with London offices at the BBC's Bush House. As the Political Warfare Executive was a secret department, when dealing with the outside world it used the cover name Political Intelligence Department (PID).

After D-Day most of PWE's white propaganda staff transferred to the Psychological Warfare Division (PWD/SHAEF) of SHAEF.

At the end of World War II PWE were tasked with the re-education of German prisoners of war. As with different types of propaganda, PWE used the same 'white', 'grey', and 'black' classifications for German POWs. Prisoners classed as 'black' were considered dangerous ardent Nazis, with anti-Nazis classed as 'white' and regular non-political soldiers classed as 'grey'.

== Activities ==
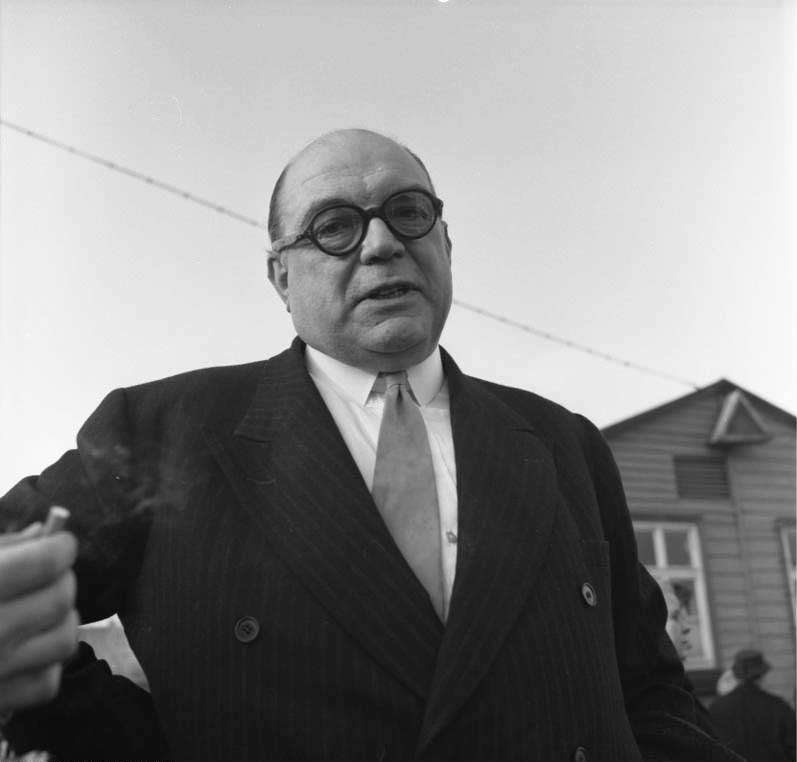
Sefton Delmer (1958), PWE operative

Activities of the PWE included distributing covert propaganda ranging from broadcasts to loudspeaker operations to lower morale and encourage desertion, leaflet drops, and underground publications in occupied countries, running rumour campaigns and creating forgeries, among others.

The main forms of propaganda were in the form of radio broadcasts and printed postcards, leaflets and documents. PWE created a number of clandestine radio stations including Gustav Siegfried Eins, Soldatensender Calais and Kurzwellesender Atlantik.

In order to deliver its subversive messages, PWE also disseminated information on events in Germany and the occupied countries, gathering intelligence from other services and agencies, including POW interrogations, and newspapers obtained from occupied countries, and bombing raid photo analysis. This last source was used to broadcast lists of streets (and even individual houses) that had been destroyed and on occasion to mock up faked "real time" reports of the German media.

Some of PWE's activities were controversial, such as impersonating deceased German soldiers and sending food parcels to their families with pacifist messages on their behalf. Later, Sefton Delmer, who ran British black propaganda radio stations during the war, quipped that although family hopes to see their loved ones were false, the ham was real.

== See also ==
- Information Research Department
- Psychological warfare
