= Gawcott =

Village in Buckinghamshire, England

Coordinates: 51.981°N 1.010°W

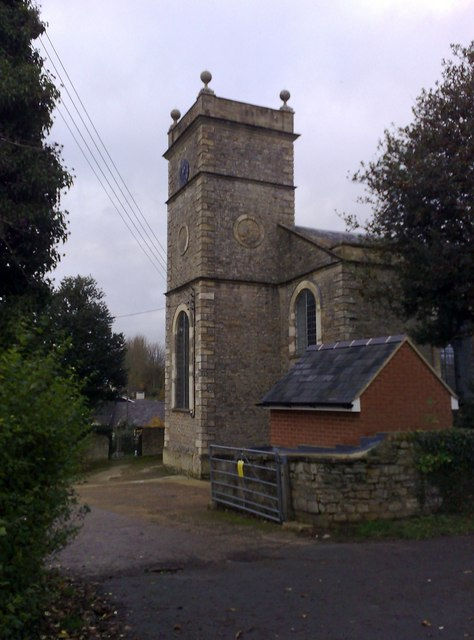
- Tower of Holy Trinity parish church

- Location within Buckinghamshire
- Gawcott with Lenborough
- Population: 778 (2011 Census, parish)
- OS grid reference: SP6831
- Civil parish: Gawcott with Lenborough
- Unitary authority: Buckinghamshire
- Ceremonial county: Buckinghamshire
- Region: South East
- Country: England
- Sovereign state: United Kingdom
- Post town: Buckingham
- Postcode district: MK18
- Dialling code: 01280
- Police: Thames Valley
- Fire: Buckinghamshire
- Ambulance: South Central
- UK Parliament: Buckingham and Bletchley

Gawcott is a village about 1.5 miles (2.4 km) southwest of Buckingham in the Buckinghamshire district in the ceremonial county of Buckinghamshire, England. The village is in the civil parish of Gawcott with Lenborough.

== History ==
The toponym is derived from the Old English for "cottage for which rent is payable". The Domesday Book of 1086 records the village as Chauescote. An alternative description for the name of Gawcott, however, comes from the old Norse word for the cuckoo, 'Gaukr', pronounced Gawk and 'cott' for house/ home/ cottage.

This explanation has some merit as in the west of the village the cuckoo was the prevalent bird up until the early 1940s when much of its habitat was destroyed to make space for servicemen in the Second World War. One of the local historic public houses of the village was also named the Cuckoo's Nest.

Sir George Gilbert Scott, the architect of the Midland Grand Hotel at St Pancras railway station in London (and numerous other buildings), was born in Gawcott where his father, the Reverend Thomas Scott (1780–1835), was perpetual curate.

== Signal Hill ==
To the east of the village is Signal Hill, which was a former FCO/MI6 signals intelligence station.

== See also ==
- Sefton Delmer
