= Sefton Delmer =

British journalist and propagandist (1904–1979)

Sefton Delmer, OBE
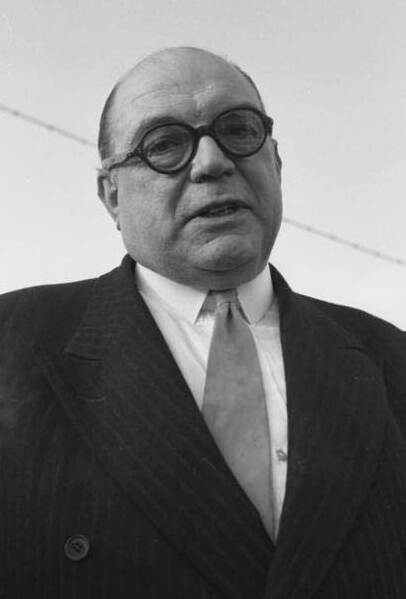
- Delmer at the Friedland Refugee Camp in 1958
- Born: Denis Sefton Delmer; 24 May 1904; Berlin, Kingdom of Prussia, Germany
- Died: 4 September 1979 (aged 75); Lamarsh, England
- Education: Friedrichwerdersches Gymnasium; St Paul's School, London; Lincoln College, Oxford
- Known for: Propaganda work for the British in Second World War
- Spouse: Isabel Nicholas (m. 1936; div. 1947)

Denis Sefton Delmer OBE (24 May 1904 – 4 September 1979) was a British journalist of Australian heritage and propagandist for the British government during the Second World War.

Born in Berlin and fluent in German, he became friendly with Ernst Röhm, who arranged for him to interview Adolf Hitler in 1931. As an announcer for the BBC German service in 1939, Delmer's provocative on-air reaction to Hitler's offer of peace caused the German authorities to add his name to the Special Search List for arrest after they had invaded Britain. During the war, he led a black propaganda campaign against Hitler by radio from England.

== Early life ==
Denis Sefton Delmer, known familiarly as "Tom", was born in Berlin as a British subject, as a son of Australian parents living in Germany. His father, Frederick Sefton Delmer, was British of Australian heritage, born in Hobart, Tasmania, who became Professor of English Literature at Berlin University and author of a standard textbook for German schools.

On the outbreak of the First World War his father was interned in Ruhleben internment camp, near Berlin, as an enemy alien. In 1917, the Delmer family was repatriated to England in a prisoner exchange between the British and German governments. He was brought up to speak only German until the age of five, and as late as 1939 spoke English with a slight accent.

Delmer was educated at the Friedrichswerdersches Gymnasium, Berlin, St Paul's School, London, and Lincoln College, Oxford, where he obtained a second-class degree in modern languages.

== Early career ==
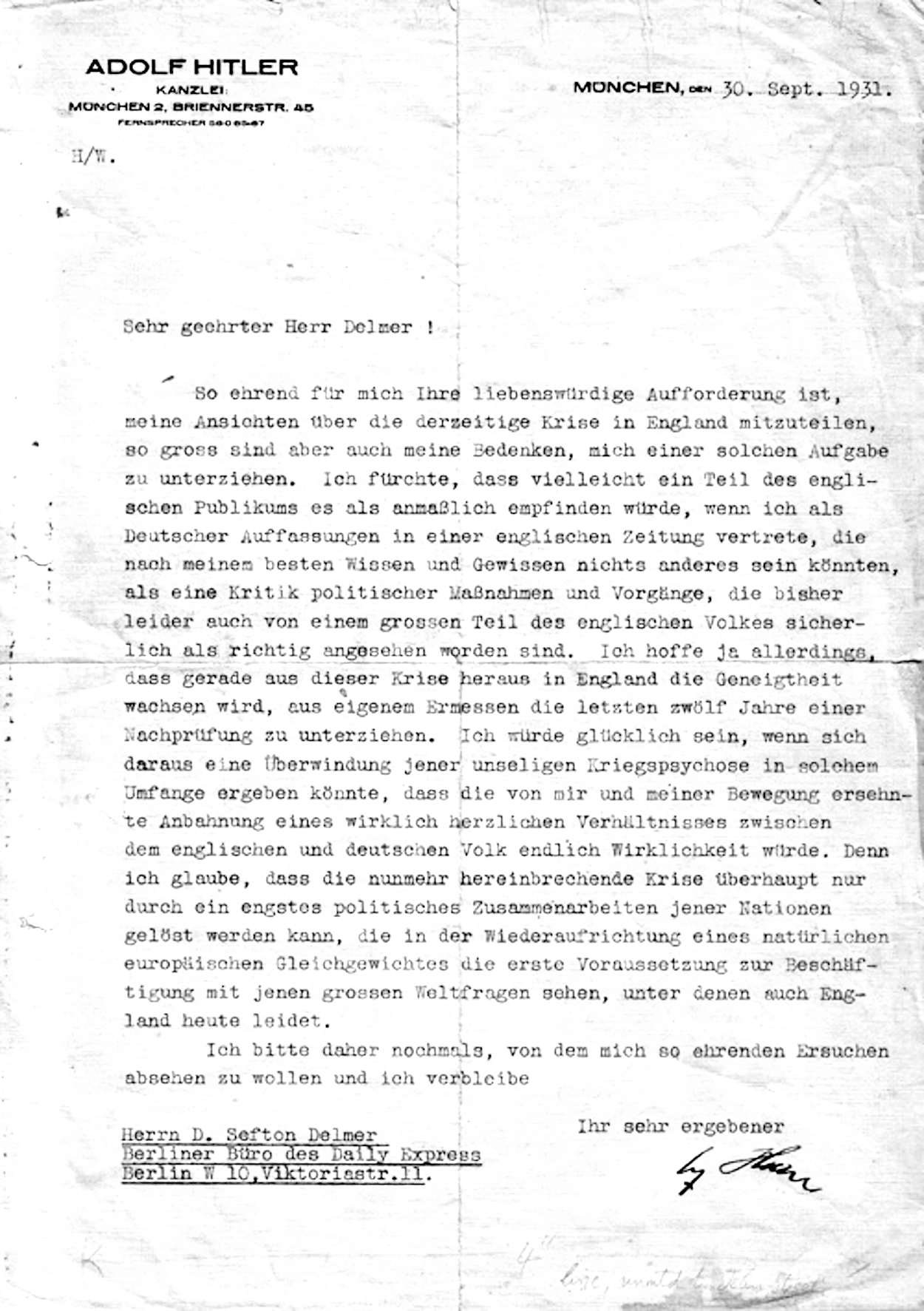
Cordial letter from Hitler to Delmer, 30 September 1931, commenting on "crisis" in England

After leaving university, Delmer worked as a freelance journalist until he was recruited by the Daily Express to become head of its new Berlin Bureau. While in Germany, he became friendly with Ernst Röhm, who arranged for him to become the first British journalist to interview Adolf Hitler, in April 1931.

In the 1932 German federal election, Delmer travelled with Hitler aboard his private aircraft. He was "embedded with Nazi party activists" at this time, "taking copious notes on everything from the style of the would-be Führer's oratory to the group think that lay behind the bond he was forming with the German people." He was also present in 1933 when Hitler inspected the aftermath of the Reichstag fire. During this period, Delmer was criticised for being a Nazi sympathiser, and for a time, the British government thought he was in the pay of the Nazis. At the same time, the Nazi leaders were convinced Delmer was a member of MI6; his denials of any involvement only served to strengthen their belief that he was not only a member, but an important one.

In 1933, Delmer was sent to France as head of the Daily Express Paris Bureau. In 1936, Delmer married the artist Isabel Nichols. Delmer covered important events in Europe including the Spanish Civil War (reporting with Ernest Hemingway, Martha Gellhorn and Herbert Matthews) and the invasion of Poland by the Wehrmacht in 1939. He also reported on the German western offensive in 1940.

== Wartime ==
Delmer returned to Britain and worked for a time as an announcer for the German Service of the BBC. After Hitler broadcast a speech from the Reichstag offering peace terms, Delmer responded immediately, stating that the British hurl the terms "right back at you, in your evil-smelling teeth". When, in 1945, Delmer learnt that he had been placed on Germany's Special Search List for arrest after the invasion of Britain, he concluded that it was this broadcast that had put him there. Delmer's instant (but unauthorised) rejection had a great impact on Germany, where Joseph Goebbels concluded it had to have come from the government. The forthright reaction caused consternation in Berlin, where it was assumed that it could not have been made without official clearance, but the lack of authorisation was later condemned in a House of Commons debate, with MP Richard Stokes deploring that the response had been made without the authority of parliament.

Delmer considered that British wartime attempts to counter German propaganda were misguided, with broadcasts aimed at anti-Nazis who did not need convincing. When he was in a position to do so, he broadcast posing as a fanatical Nazi who was critical of the Nazi leadership, using salacious material about officials' sadomasochistic orgies, luring in listeners and breaking taboos about insulting Nazi officials. About 40% of German soldiers listened to Delmer's stations; they were among the top three in Munich, and very effective.

=== Radio stations ===
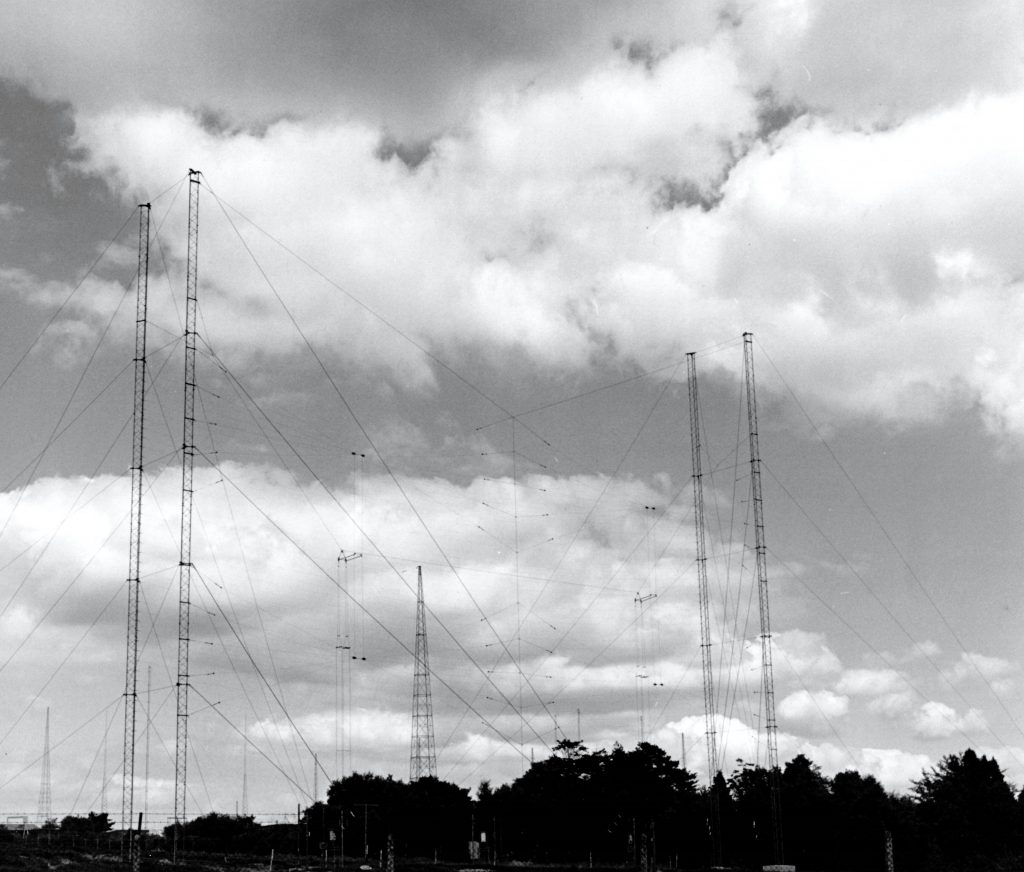
The Aspidistra transmitter, Sussex, used for Delmer's Atlantiksender propaganda broadcasts

In September 1940, Delmer was recruited by the Political Warfare Executive (PWE) to organise black propaganda broadcasts to Nazi Germany as part of a psychological warfare campaign. Leonard Ingrams of the PWE gained clearance for Delmer to work for the Political Intelligence Department of the Foreign Office. The operation joined a number of other "research units" operating propaganda broadcasts, based at Wavendon Tower (now in Milton Keynes), but in spring 1941, Delmer was given his own base, a former private house in nearby Aspley Guise.

The concept was that the radio station would undermine Hitler by pretending to be a fervent Hitler-Nazi supporter. Under Delmer's leadership a number of notable people played a part: Muriel Spark, Ellic Howe, and Delmer's college friend, the cartoonist Osbert Lancaster. Some of Lancaster's Daily Express cartoons were reprinted into booklets aimed at civilians under German occupation and dropped by the RAF.

Delmer's first, most notable success was a shortwave station: Gustav Siegfried Eins (Gustave Siegfried One), G3 in the Research units. It was "run" by the character "Der Chef", an unrepentant Nazi, who disparaged both Winston Churchill ("that flatfooted son of a drunken Jew") and the "Parteikommune", the "Party Commune" supporters who betrayed the Nazi revolution. The station name, "Gustav Siegfried Eins" (phonetic alphabet for "GS1") left a question in listeners' minds – did it mean Geheimsender 1: (Secret Transmitter 1) or Generalstab 1 (General Staff 1)?

GS1 went on the air on the evening of 23 May 1941 — earlier than intended, to exploit the capture of Hitler's deputy, Rudolf Hess, in Britain. Peter Seckelmann, a former German writer of detective stories who had fled Nazi Germany, was recruited from a Pioneer Corps bomb-disposal squad in London and he was the first member of the team to arrive at the discreet house known as "The Rookery" in Aspley Guise. He played "Der Chef". (In Delmer's autobiography Black Boomerang he acknowledges that "Some of the names of persons mentioned in this book have been camouflaged [ … ]" and Seckelmann was there named "Paul Sanders". ) A journalist, Frank Lynder, using the name "Johannes Reinholz", arrived soon after and played the adjutant to "Der Chef". Both men assisted Delmer with the scripts. The recordings were made on disc and taken by courier for transmission from a Foreign Office transmitter at nearby Signal Hill, Gawcott.

When Sir Stafford Cripps discovered what Delmer was involved with (through the intervention of Richard Crossman, who had sent him a transcript from the broadcast of one of Delmer's more salacious inventions), Cripps wrote to Anthony Eden, then Foreign Secretary: "If this is the sort of thing that is needed to win the war, why, I'd rather lose it." Delmer was defended by Robert Bruce Lockhart, who pointed out the need to reach the sadist in the German nature. GS1 ran for 700 broadcasts before Delmer killed it off in late 1943 with gunfire heard over the radio intimating that the authorities had caught up with "Der Chef". Owing to an error by a non-German-speaking transmitter engineer, the programme was accidentally repeated and "Der Chef's" dramatic on-air murder was broadcast twice.

Delmer created several stations and was successful through a careful use of intelligence using gossip intercepted in German mail to neutral countries to create credible stories. Delmer's credit within the intelligence agencies was such that the Admiralty sought him out to target German submarine crews with demoralising news bulletins. For this, Delmer had access to Aspidistra, a 500 kW radio transmitter obtained from RCA in the US (their largest off-the-shelf-model), which Section VIII bought for £165,000. Use of Aspidistra, which began in 1942, was split between PWE, the BBC, and the RAF.

Delmer's creation was Deutscher Kurzwellensender Atlantik (or popularly Atlantiksender). This station used US jazz (banned within Germany as decadent) and up-to-date dance music from Germany (extracted via Sweden and RAF courier), as well as an in-house German dance band. Important details on naval procedures came from anti-Nazis identified in POW camps, whose mail was sifted to create personalised announcements. The presenter ("Vicki") was Agnes Bernelle, a refugee of part-Jewish origin from Berlin.

Christ the King (G.8) broadcast an attack on the conscience of religious Germans, telling of the horrors of the labour and concentration camps, through a German priest.

=== Soldatensender Calais ===
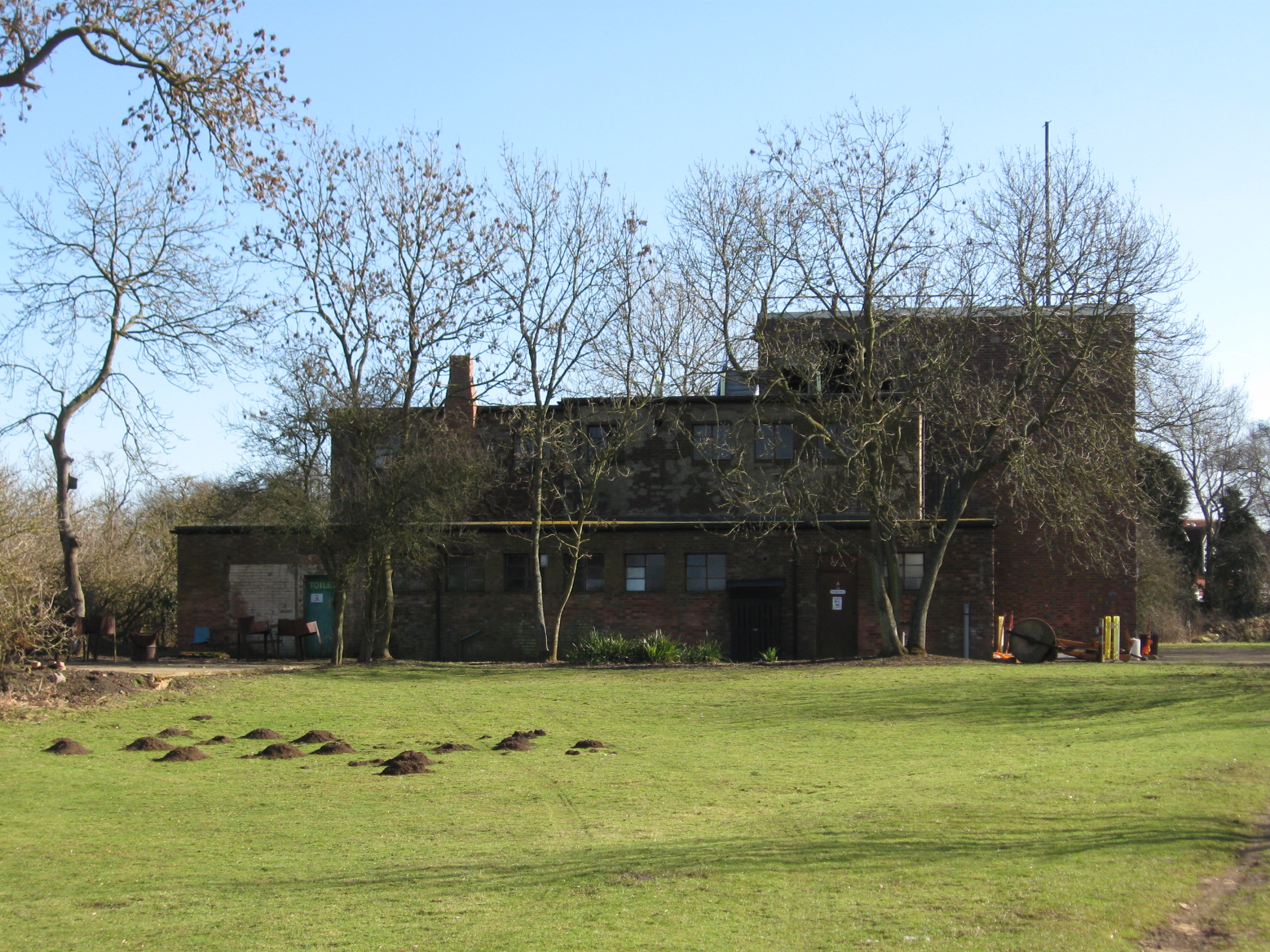
Purpose-built radio studio at Milton Bryan for "Soldatensender Calais"

Soldatensender Calais ("Calais Armed Forces Radio Station") was another clandestine radio station Delmer directed at the German armed forces. Based in Milton Bryan and connected by high-quality telephone lines for transmission from the Aspidistra transmitter at Crowborough, Soldatensender Calais produced live broadcasts, a combination of popular music, "cover" support of the war, and "dirt" – items inserted to demoralise German forces. Delmer's black propaganda sought to propagate rumours that German soldiers' wives were sleeping with the many foreign workers in Germany at the time. Bernelle, again, was presenter.

The station also proved to be popular on the German home front. While the station was in the format of a German military station, it did not pose as an actual Nazi station; but although listeners knew the station was run by the British, they listened to and trusted it, and could use the excuse that they thought it was a legitimate German station if caught listening to it.

Delmer also oversaw the production of a daily "grey" German-language newspaper titled Nachrichten für die Truppe ("News for the Troops"), which first appeared in May 1944, much of its text being based on the Soldatensender Calais broadcasts. Nachrichten für die Truppe was written by a team provided to Delmer by SHAEF, and disseminated over Germany, Belgium and France each morning by the Special Leaflet Squadron of the US Eighth Air Force.

When fighting entered Germany itself, black propaganda was used to create an impression of an anti-Nazi resistance movement.

At the end of the war in Europe, Delmer advised his colleagues not to publicise the work they had been involved in, lest unrepentant Nazis claim (as had been the case after the First World War), that they had been defeated by unconscionable methods, rather than on the battlefield. Consequently, former Nazis were able to claim, without contradiction, that they had assisted the fictitious resistance movement; Delmer described this unintended consequence as a "black boomerang".

In December 1945, Delmer was appointed an Officer of the Order of the British Empire (OBE), with the citation specifying merely that he was "Controller of a Division, Foreign Office".

== Later career and retirement ==
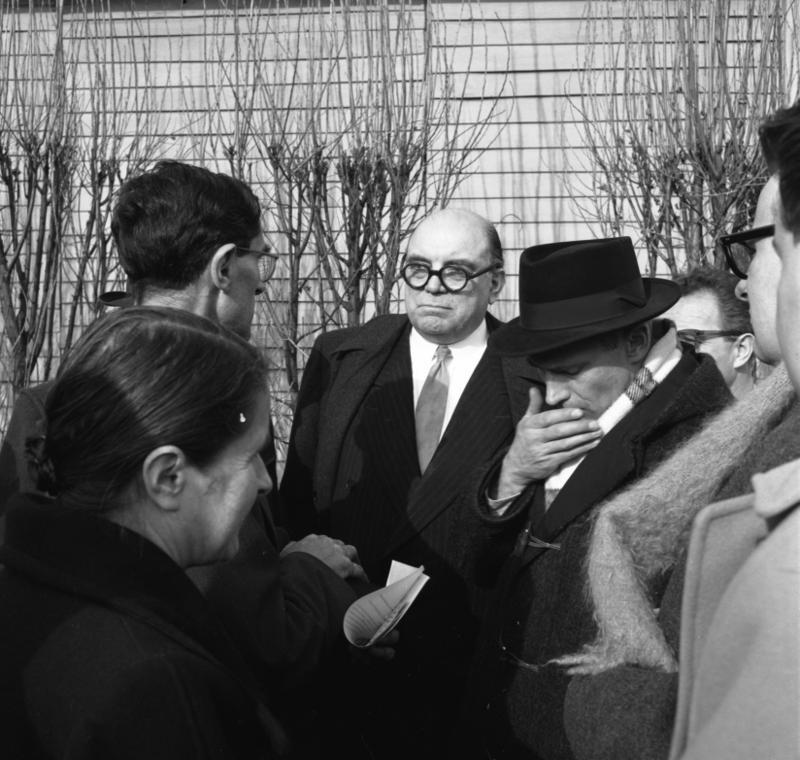
Delmer reporting from a German reception camp for refugees from the east, 1958

After the Second World War, Delmer returned to the Daily Express as chief foreign affairs reporter. Reinhard Gehlen stated it was Delmer's Daily Express article of 17 March 1952 which dragged the German intelligence chief into the daylight by unleashing a "flood of further publications". Over the next fifteen years, he covered nearly every major foreign news story for the newspaper. However, he was sacked by Lord Beaverbrook in 1959 over an expenses issue.

Delmer wrote two volumes of autobiography, Trail Sinister (1961) and Black Boomerang (1962), and several other books, including Weimar Germany (1972) and The Counterfeit Spy (1971), an account of the Double-Cross deception. David Hare based his play Licking Hitler on Black Boomerang, and his plot included the faked, on-air discovery and shooting of the broadcaster, in the same way as Delmer had finished the career of "Der Chef".

Delmer was the subject of a This Is Your Life broadcast in 1962, when he was surprised by Eamonn Andrews outside Le Caprice restaurant in London's Mayfair. He was the subject of a book and BBC Radio 4 series by Peter Pomerantsev in 2024.

He retired to Lamarsh in Essex, near Little Sampford, where his former wife Isabel lived with her third husband. He died at Lamarsh, after a long illness, on 4 September 1979.
