= White propaganda =

Propaganda that does not hide its origin or nature

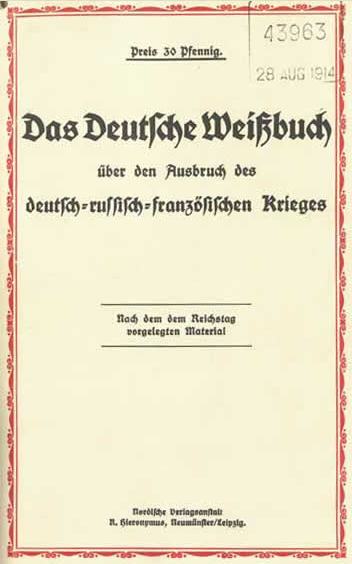
The German White Book (1914), a government-printed piece of white propaganda in support of the German entry into World War I

White propaganda is propaganda that does not hide its origin or nature. It is the most common type of propaganda and is distinguished from black propaganda which disguises its origin to discredit an opposing cause.

It typically uses standard public relations techniques and one-sided presentation of an argument. In some languages the word "propaganda" does not have a negative connotation. For example, the Russian word propaganda (пропаганда) has a neutral connotation in some cases, similar to the English word "promotion" (of an opinion or argument). Jacques Ellul, in one of the major books on the subject of propaganda, Propaganda: The Formation of Men's Attitudes, mentions white propaganda as an acknowledgment of the awareness of the public of attempts being made to influence it. In some states there is a Ministry of Propaganda, for instance; in such a case, one admits that propaganda is being made, its source is known, and its aims and intentions are identified.

== See also ==
- Gray propaganda – Use of political means to compel an opponent with hostile intent
- Official history – Work of history which is sponsored or endorsed by its subject
- Operation Mockingbird – Alleged program of the CIA
- Public diplomacy – Public relations as a form of diplomacy
