= Black propaganda =

Form of influence campaign

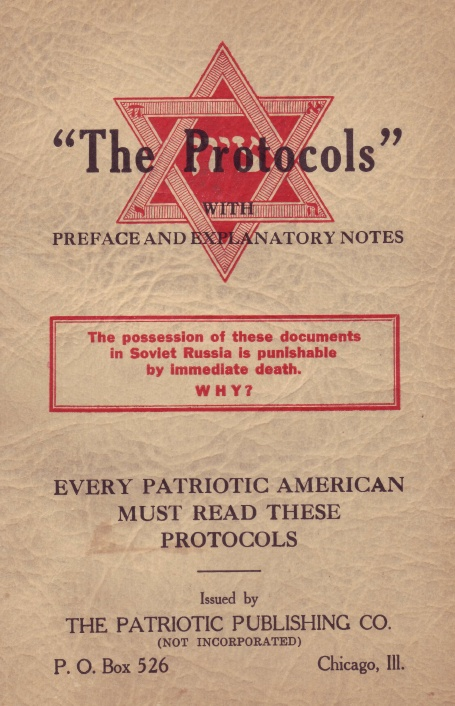
The Protocols of the Elders of Zion (1905), an antisemitic forgery which positions itself as a pamphlet from a fictitious international Jewish conspiracy, is an example of black propaganda.

Black propaganda is covert disinformation deliberately attributed to a false source—often the very group it aims to discredit—in order to undermine that group's credibility. Black propaganda contrasts with gray propaganda, which does not identify its source, as well as white propaganda, which does not disguise its origins at all. It is typically used to vilify or embarrass the enemy through misrepresentation.

The major characteristic of black propaganda is that the audience are not aware that someone is influencing them, and do not feel that they are being pushed in a certain direction. Black propaganda purports to emanate from a source other than the true source. This type of propaganda is associated with covert psychological operations. Sometimes the source is concealed or credited to a false authority and spreads lies, fabrications, and deceptions. Black propaganda is the "big lie", including all types of creative deceit. Black propaganda relies on the willingness of the receiver to accept the credibility of the source. If the creators or senders of the black propaganda message do not adequately understand their intended audience, the message may be misunderstood, seem suspect, or fail altogether. Black propaganda uses certain methods to affect an audience through the use of already held beliefs, emotions, and ideas of authority. Since black propaganda keeps the true sender anonymous, messages appear more credible or like those of other groups. Such tactics show how important it is for an audience's perceptions to be considered when studying propaganda (Jowett & O'Donnell, 2019) Governments can conduct black propaganda for various reasons. By disguising their direct involvement, a government may be more likely to succeed in convincing an otherwise unbelieving target audience. There are also diplomatic reasons behind the use of black propaganda. Black propaganda is necessary to obfuscate a government's involvement in activities that may be detrimental to its foreign policies.

== American Revolution ==
In Europe in 1782, Benjamin Franklin created and circulated a fake supplement to a Boston newspaper that included letters on Indian atrocities and the treatment of American prisoners, intending to influence British public opinion to support paying war reparations to America.

== World War II ==
=== British ===
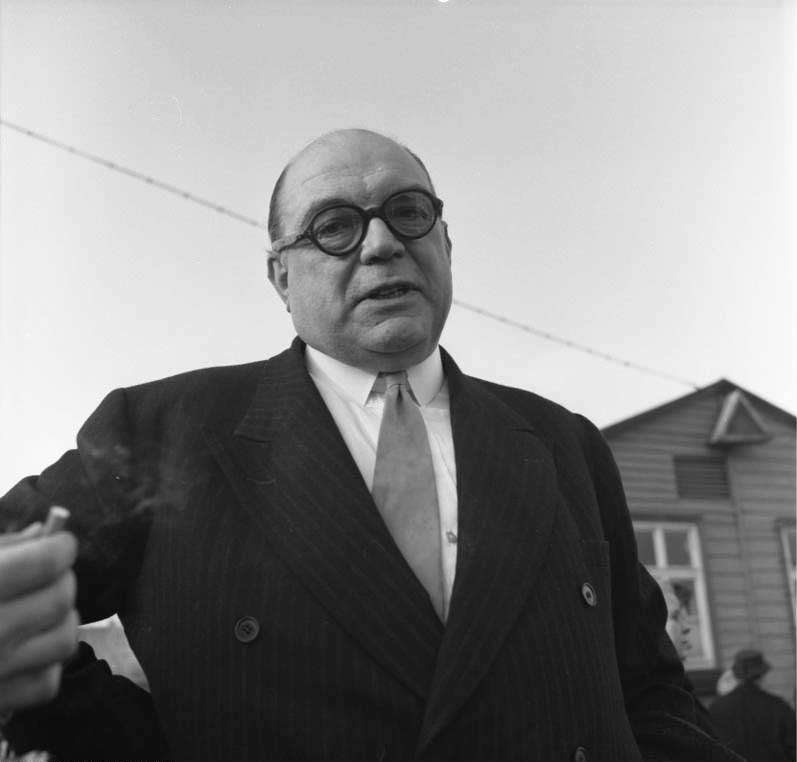
Sefton Delmer (1958)

In the United Kingdom, the Political Warfare Executive operated a number of black propaganda radio stations. Gustav Siegfried Eins (GS1) was one of the first such stations—purporting to be a clandestine German station. The speaker, "Der Chef", purported to be a Nazi extremist, accusing Adolf Hitler and his henchmen of going soft. The station focused on alleged corruption and sexual improprieties of Nazi Party members.

Another example was the British radio station Soldatensender Calais, which purported to be a radio station for the Wehrmacht. Under the direction of Sefton Delmer, a British journalist who spoke perfect Berliner German, Soldatensender Calais and its associated shortwave station, Deutscher Kurzwellensender Atlantik, broadcast music, up-to-date sports scores, speeches of Adolf Hitler for "cover" and subtle propaganda.

Radio Deutschland was another radio station employed by the British during the war aimed and designed to undermine German morale and create tensions that would ultimately disrupt the German war effort. The station was broadcast on a frequency close on the radio dial to an actual German station. During the war most Germans actually believed that this station was in fact a German radio station and it even gained the recognition of Germany's propaganda chief Joseph Goebbels.

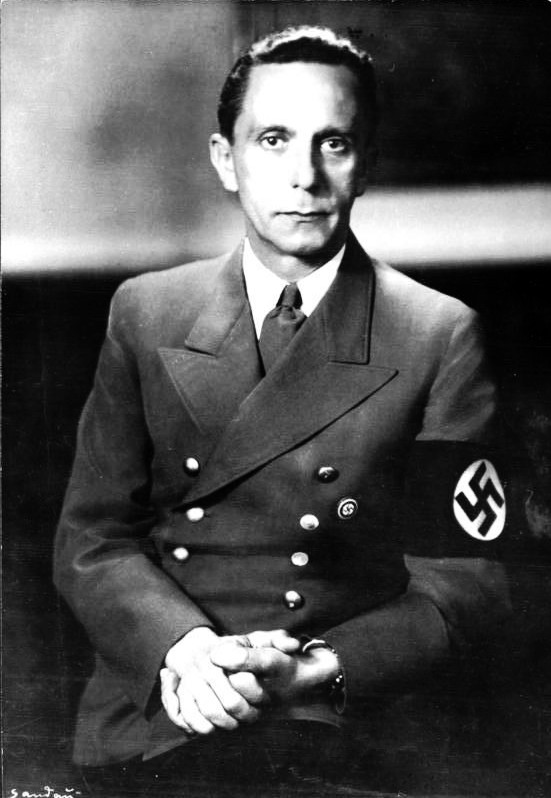
Goebbels, German Federal Archive photo

There were British black propaganda radio stations in most of the languages of occupied Europe as well as German and Italian. Most of these were based in the area around Bletchley Park and Woburn Abbey in Buckinghamshire and Bedfordshire respectively.

Another possible example was a rumour that there had been a German attempt to land on British shores at Shingle Street, but it had been repelled with high German casualties. This was reported in the American press, and in William L. Shirer's Berlin Diary but was officially denied. British papers, declassified in 1993, have suggested this was a successful example of British black propaganda to bolster morale in the UK, US and occupied Europe.

Author James Hayward has proposed that the rumours, which were widely reported in the American press, were a successfully engineered example of black propaganda with an aim of ensuring American co-operation and securing lend lease resources by showing that the United Kingdom was capable of successfully resisting the might of the German Army.

David Hare's play Licking Hitler provides a fictionalised account based on the British black propaganda efforts in World War II.

=== German ===
The German Büro Concordia organisation operated several black propaganda radio stations (many of which pretended to broadcast illegally from within the countries they targeted). One of these stations was Workers' Challenge which purported to be a British communist radio station and encouraged British workers to go on strike against their "capitalist" bosses.

=== Pacific Theatre ===
The Tanaka Memorial was a document that described a Japanese plan for world conquest, beginning with the conquest of China. It was widely referenced in official American anti-Japanese propaganda (such as The Battle of China and Know Your Enemy: Japan), but most historians now believe it was a forgery.

The following message was distributed in black propaganda leaflets dropped by the Japanese over the Philippines in World War II. It was designed to turn Filipinos against the United States:

GUARD AGAINST VENEREAL DISEASES

Lately there has been a great increase in the number of venereal diseases among our officers and men owing to prolific contacts with Filipino women of dubious character.

Due to hard times and stricken conditions brought about by the Japanese occupation of the islands, Filipino women are willing to offer themselves for a small amount of foodstuffs. It is advisable in such cases to take full protective measures by use of condoms, protective medicines, etc.; better still to hold intercourse only with wives, virgins, or women of respective [sic] character.

Furthermore, in view of the increase in pro-American leanings, many Filipino women are more than willing to offer themselves to American soldiers, and due to the fact that Filipinos have no knowledge of hygiene, disease carriers are rampant and due care must be taken.

— U. S. ARMY

== Cold War ==
=== Soviet Union ===
Prior to, and during the Cold War, the Soviet Union used disinformation on multiple occasions, employing the KGB's Service A of the First Chief Directorate in order to conduct its covert, or "black", "active measures". It was Service A that was responsible for clandestine campaigns that were targeted at foreign governments, public populations, as well as to influence individuals and specific groups that were hostile towards the Soviet government and its policies. The majority of their operations was actually conducted by other elements and directorates of the KGB.

=== United Kingdom ===
Declassified documents have revealed that the British government ran a secret black propaganda campaign for decades, targeting Africa, the Middle East and parts of Asia with leaflets and reports from fake sources aimed at destabilising cold war enemies by encouraging racial tensions, sowing chaos, inciting violence and reinforcing anti-communist ideas.

==== Indonesia ====
One of the British campaigns played a part in the Indonesian mass killings of 1965–66, one of the worst mass murders of the 20th century. This tragedy was fuelled by black information written by British operatives based in Singapore. Exploiting a failed coup attempt by a palace guard, these operatives falsely blamed the Indonesian Communist Party (PKI) and the ethnic Chinese. Despite no evidence linking the PKI to the coup, they posed as exiled Indonesian patriots and incited violence by accusing them of involvement and called for their "elimination". Subsequently, mass killings targeting Indonesian people, PKI members, and followers of Sukarno ensued, resulting in an estimated death toll of at least 500,000.

== In domestic politics ==
=== Australian media ===
- In the run-up to the 2007 federal election in Australia, flyers were circulated around Sydney under the name of a fake organisation called the Islamic Australia Federation. The flyers thanked the Australian Labor Party for supporting terrorism, Islamic fundamentalists, and the Bali bombing suspects. A group of Sydney-based Liberal Party members were implicated in the incident.

=== British media ===
- In November 1995, a Sunday Telegraph newspaper article alleged Libya's Saif al-Islam Gaddafi (Muammar Gaddafi's son) was connected to currency counterfeiting. The story's author, Con Coughlin, falsely attributed the claim to a "British banking official", but his information actually came from MI6 agents. This fact, and the fact that Coughlin had no other sources for the story, only came to light when Saif Gaddafi later sued the newspaper for libel.
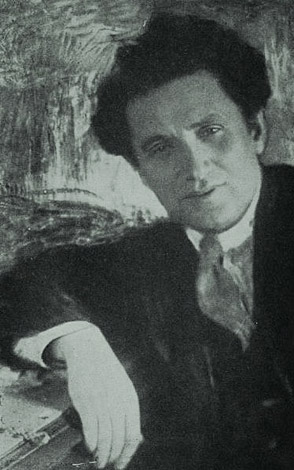
  Grigory Zinoviev
- The Zinoviev letter was a fake letter published in 1924 in the British newspaper the Daily Mail. It claimed to be a letter from the Comintern president Grigory Zinoviev to the Communist Party of Great Britain. It called on Communists to mobilise "sympathetic forces" in the Labour Party and talked of creating dissent in the British Armed Forces. The Zinoviev letter was instrumental in the Conservative victory in the 1924 general election. The letter seemed authentic at the time, but historians now believe it was a forgery. Historians now agree that the letter had little impact on the Labour vote—which held up in 1924. However, it aided the Conservative Party in hastening the collapse of the Liberal Party that led to the Conservative landslide.

=== United States media ===
- In the "Roorback forgery" of 1844 the Chronicle of Ithaca, New York ran a story, supposedly by a German tourist called Baron von Roorback, that James K. Polk, standing for re-election as a Democrat to the United States House of Representatives, branded his slaves before selling them at auction to distinguish them from the others on sale. Polk actually benefited from the ploy, as it reflected badly on his opponents when the lie was found out. Afterwards the term "Roorback" was coined for political dirty tricks.
- During the 1972 U.S. presidential election, Donald H. Segretti, a political operative for President Richard Nixon's reelection campaign, released a faked letter, on Senator Edmund Muskie's letterhead, falsely alleging that Senator Henry "Scoop" Jackson, against whom Muskie was running for the Democratic Party's nomination, had had an illegitimate child with a seventeen-year-old. Muskie, who had been considered the frontrunner, lost the nomination to George McGovern, and Nixon was reelected. The letter was part of a campaign of so-called "dirty tricks", directed by Segretti, and uncovered as part of the Watergate Scandal. Segretti went to prison in 1974 after pleading guilty to three misdemeanor counts of distributing illegal campaign literature. Another of his dirty tricks was the "Canuck letter", although this was libel of Muskie and not a black propaganda piece.

=== United States government ===
- The Federal Bureau of Investigation's counter-intelligence program COINTELPRO was intended to, according to the FBI, "expose, disrupt, misdirect, discredit, or otherwise neutralize the activities of black nationalists, hate-type organizations and groups, their leadership, membership, and supporters". Black propaganda was used on Communists and the Black Panther Party. It was also used against opposition to the U.S. involvement in the Vietnam War, labor leaders, and Native Americans. The FBI's strategy was captured in a 1968 memo: "Consider the use of cartoons, photographs, and anonymous letters which will have the effect of ridiculing the New Left. Ridicule is one of the most potent weapons which we can use against it."
- "The Penkovsky Papers" are an example of a black propaganda effort conducted by the United States' Central Intelligence Agency during the 1960s. The "Penkovsky Papers" were alleged to have been written by a Soviet GRU defector, Colonel Oleg Penkovsky, but were in fact produced by the CIA in an effort to diminish the Soviet Union's credibility at a pivotal time during the Cold War.
- Following the September 11 attacks against the United States, the U.S. Department of Defense organized and implemented the Office of Strategic Influence in an effort to improve public support abroad, mainly in Muslim countries. The head of OSI was USAF General Pete Worden, who maintained a mission described by The New York Times as "circulating classified proposals calling for aggressive campaigns that use[d] not only the foreign media and the Internet, but also covert operations". Worden and then-Defense Secretary Donald Rumsfeld planned for what Pentagon officials said was "a broad mission ranging from 'black' campaigns that use[d] disinformation and other covert activities to 'white' public affairs that rely on truthful news releases". The OSI's operations were more than public relations work in that they included contacting and emailing media, journalists, and foreign community leaders with information which would counter foreign governments and organizations hostile to the United States. In doing so, the emails would be masked by using addresses ending with .com as opposed to using the standard Pentagon address of .mil, and hide any involvement of the US government and the Pentagon. The thought of conducting black propaganda operations and utilizing disinformation resulted in harsh criticism for the program that resulted in its closure in 2002.

=== Religious black propaganda ===
- In 1955, the Church of Scientology published the book Brain-Washing, which was allegedly written by the Soviet secret police chief Lavrentiy Beria. In fact, the book describes all of the practices Scientology opposes (brain surgery, psychiatric drugs, psychology, child labor laws, and income tax) as Communist conspiracies directed by Moscow, and it describes the greatest threat to "Communism" as being "The Church of Scientology" (the Catholic Church is barely mentioned as a threat to the Soviet Union, and the Eastern Orthodox Church, the dominant religion of the Soviet Union, is not mentioned at all). Additionally, "Beria" uses precise phrases that L. Ron Hubbard (creator of Scientology) has coined, such as "pain-drug hypnosis" and "thinkingness".
- The Church of Scientology, under the leadership of L. Ron Hubbard, is alleged to have advocated the usage of "black propaganda" to "destroy reputation or public belief in persons, companies or nations" as a practice of "fair game" against suppressive persons. After the author Paulette Cooper wrote The Scandal of Scientology, the Church of Scientology ran a false flag operation that stole stationery from her in order to fabricate bomb threats.

=== Environmentalist black propaganda ===
- The "Let's Go! Shell in the Arctic" website was designed to look like an official website by Royal Dutch Shell, but was in fact a fake produced by Greenpeace.

== Digital communication and black propaganda ==
Moreover, there are additional opportunities to spread black propaganda through digital communication channels as websites, social media pages, and online platforms that allow for sending misleading information and hiding the true identity of its creator. Some fake accounts or bots may also participate in spreading the information intended to manipulate people's minds. All these factors may complicate the work of potential audiences as far as identifying the creator of some misleading information.

Nevertheless, all misleading information spread online does not belong to black propaganda. Black propaganda includes only the spreading of such information whose source is hidden or faked. In addition, the digital communication may include the elements of disinformation and misinformation, which cannot be considered synonyms. Misinformation implies inaccurate information, but not intentionally spread, while disinformation means spreading false information.

It is possible to examine the relationship between black propaganda and digital communication from the standpoint of propaganda techniques, source credibility, and audience response. As for the latter issue, it is reasonable to refer to Propaganda & Persuasion by Jowett and O'Donnell, where it is suggested to analyze the role of source, purpose, audience, and form of message in its persuasive effect.

== Propaganda and persuasion ==
The type of propaganda discussed above, black propaganda, is associated with the more general notion of persuasion, since the latter denotes efforts to affect attitudes, beliefs, and actions. Yet, while deception may be involved in persuasion, such persuasion is not always characterized by deception, nor is every case of persuasion propaganda. The distinguishing feature of black propaganda is the use of deception regarding the originator of the message.

The difference between propaganda and persuasion is significant, since it shows that communication does not necessarily depend on misinformation or concealed origins to affect people. The examination of the goals, the creator of a message, and the distribution techniques of a message allows researchers to identify black propaganda.

== See also ==
- Astroturfing
- Atrocity propaganda
- Black legend
- Brainwashing
- Denial and deception
- False flag
- Information warfare
- Joe job
- Nazi propaganda
- Political machine
- Psychological warfare
- Push polling
- Special Activities Division
- State-sponsored Internet propaganda
- Taliban propaganda
- The Terror Network
- Whispering campaign

== Bibliography ==
- Boyce, Fredric. SOE's ultimate deception: Operation Periwig Stroud: Sutton, 2005. ISBN 0-7509402-7-1
- Delmer, Denis Sefton. Black Boomerang London: Secker and Warburg, 1962
- Howe, Ellic. The Black Game: British subversive operations against the Germans during the Second World War London: Michael Joseph, 1982. ISBN 0-7181171-8-2
- Linebarger, Paul Myron Anthony. 1954. Psychological Warfare, Combat Forces Press, Washington
- Newcourt-Nowodworski, Stanley. La Propaganda Negra en la Segunda Guerra Mundial. Madrid: Algaba, 2006, 336 páginas. ISBN 978-84-96107-70-0 (in Spanish)
- Richards, Lee. The Black Art: British Clandestine Psychological Warfare against the Third Reich London: www.psywar.org, 2010. ISBN 0-9542936-3-0
- Richards, Lee. Whispers of War: Underground Propaganda Rumour-mongerin in the Second World War London: www.psywar.org, 2010. ISBN 0-9542936-4-9
- Telo, António José. Propaganda e Guerra Secreta em Portugal: 1939–1945. Lisboa: Perspectivas & Realidades, 1990, pp. 33–36 (in Portuguese)
- Second World War black propaganda. National Library of Scotland, 2006
- Taylor, Philip M. Munitions of the mind: a history of propaganda from the ancient world to the present era. (Manchester: Manchester University Press, 1995)
