= Legacy of Violence =

2022 book by Caroline Elkins

Legacy of Violence: A History of the British Empire
- Author: Caroline Elkins
- Language: English
- Publication date: 2022

Legacy of Violence: A History of the British Empire is a 2022 nonfiction history book by American historian and professor Caroline Elkins. The book covers the history of the British Empire from the Great Bengal famine of 1770 through the post-World War II period of recurring end-of-empire insurgencies up until the present-day, including the Mau Mau High Court case and the ongoing imperial history wars. The book was short-listed for the 2022 Baillie Gifford Prize for Non-Fiction.

== Background ==
Caroline Elkins' first book, for which she won the 2006 Pulitzer Prize for General Nonfiction, was Imperial Reckoning: The Untold Story of Britain's Gulag in Kenya (2005), examines human rights abuses in British detention facilities in Kenya during the Mau Mau rebellion. Elkins says that she started writing Legacy of Violence to answer questions which had been raised in Imperial Reckoning. Elkins describes her research for Legacy of Violence as "arduous," in part because there were many missing documents relating to the detention camps, and British-controlled colonial Kenya in general. In 2009, four years after the publication of Imperial Reckoning, five survivors of the British detention camps in Kenya had sued the British government, and Elkins had appeared as an expert witness on the survivors' behalf. During the investigation, the British Foreign and Commonwealth Office (FCO) discovered 300 boxes of documents relating to the British detention facilities. Elkins began research for Legacy of Violence shortly after, combing through both the newly released documents as well as 8,800 files from 36 other colonies, and expanding her research to pre-World War II Britain.

== Overview ==
Elkins begins by examining the impact of British colonization on Kenya, where the empire's policies of forced labor, land confiscation, and repression led to a brutal campaign of violence against the indigenous population. She details the horrific practices of the British colonial administration, including the use of concentration camps, torture, and summary executions.

The book then expands to examine the broader legacy of the British Empire, exploring its impact on other countries, such as India and Ireland. The book explores how the government at home often disregarded colonial peoples, highlighting the 1770 famine in Bengal. Elkins talks about how the British East India Company and their various associates made record profits for London, even while the death count from the famine steadily rose due to high taxes and high grain prices.

== Reception ==
=== Newspapers and magazines ===
Tim Adams wrote in The Guardian about the book, "Legacy of Violence is a formidable piece of research that sets itself the ambition of identifying the character of British power over the course of two centuries and four continents." Nicholas Sprenger stated about the book: "This is a must-read for anyone interested in the history of the British Empire or imperialism at large." The book was positively reviewed by Kirkus Reviews, which called the book "a scathing indictment of the long and brutal history of British imperialism", as well as the Financial Times, Library Journal, and Publishers Weekly, and was listed as a book of the year by the New Statesman, and Waterstones. The New York Times put the book on their Top 100 Most Notable Books of 2022 list. It was also reviewed in The New York Times by British journalist and historian Geoffrey Wheatcroft. The book was included in the Best History Books of 2022 by historian R.J.B. Bosworth. It also made the list of BBC History Magazine’s Books of the Year 2022. Robert Lyman gave it a negative review in conservative British magazine The Critic, as did Bruce Gilley in the Washington Examiner.

=== Academic journals ===
Noted American historian Lauren Benton criticised Legacy of Violence in a review for Foreign Affairs, accusing her of "represent[ing] the empire as a consistently malevolent force", which "leads to a dubious comparison between the so-called liberal imperialism of the British Empire and the fascism of Nazi Germany, overstating the power of an ideology that was never as clear as Elkins wants it to be."

In a positive review in the academic journal Race & Class British historian John Newsinger praises the book's moral and political clarity as well as its treatment of the Palestinian revolt of the 1930s. Elsinger singles out Chapter 7, A War of Ideas, as “essential reading". He states that “the only time Elkins falters” is when she describes Hugh Dalton as “a high-minded patrician figure.” Newsinger states this characterization is too generous, given what he sees as Dalton's racist contempt for colonial subjects. The closing judgment is that Elkins has made a “magnificent contribution” to the continuing “imperial history wars.”

Writing in peer-reviewed and Canada-based International Journal, historian and Axson Johnson Institute doctoral fellow Jessi A. J. Gilchrist is particularly positive about Elkins' treatment of the postwar empire. Gilchrist notes that the book's final section provides a broad overview of British repression during anti-colonial resistance. She commends Elkins for achieving a good balance between describing imperial violence and highlighting the actions, goals, and efforts of anti-colonial figures. However, she argues that the book is “at its most controversial” in its discussion of Nazism and fascism. While accepting that there may be meaningful similarities between liberal and fascist imperial practices, she states Elkins does not adequately prove the comparison. In Gilchrist's view, the problem is not the comparison itself but the lack of empirical evidence and insufficient comparative analysis as well as little sustained analysis of Nazi empire, leaving one of the book's key claims under-supported.

Historian Angus Mitchell of the University of Limerick also praises the book calling it "remarkable". Writing in the Journal of Colonialism & Colonial History, he states that a central issue running beneath Elkin's account is the question of who has the power to withhold or limit access to truth about state-sanctioned organised violence. Mitchell further states that Elkins challenges the reader to rethink the function of archives, and of historical scholarship itself, in preserving misleading accounts of the past. He then posits that by bringing her central argument into the present, Elkins also sheds light on the "self-deception" embedded in post-Brexit British identity. He ends his review by stating that, after finishing the book, it is difficult to avoid the sense of having reached a kind of Judgment Day, when the records are symbolically opened and people are held accountable for what they have done.

Aidan Forth, Assistant Professor of History at McEwan University, states in the Journal of Interdisciplinary History that Elkin's “command of this legal history is impressive,” referring to her analysis of martial law, emergency powers, commissions of inquiry, censorship, and other legal methods that allowed the British empire to present coercion as lawful governance. The concept of “legalized lawlessness” is deemed by Forth as one of the book's most persuasive and important contributions. The reviewer also praises the way Elkins treats inter-imperial connections and also the circulation of personnel and tactics. She “deftly navigates” the movement of colonial agents from one theater of repression to another and is credited with connecting episodes of violence across the empire rather than treating them as isolated crises. Forth states her book effectively differentiates British imperial actions from Nazi Germany, where "aggression was naked and race was immutable."

Writing positively in Immigrants and Minorities, independent researcher Robert Brown states that, alongside the histories of conquest and brutality associated with Western liberalism, Elkins’ work enacts a commendable reversal within liberal traditions by using careful evidence-gathering and legal processes to hold power accountable. He concludes that her book can be a tool from which to develop broaden and rebalance debates about empire. However, Brown criticizes Elkins' inclusion of a chapter linking the recent advocacy for Brexit to Britain's violent colonial past and a nostalgia for empire, calling it "unnecessary" and that her books' "...mission statement is more than compelling enough on its own".

University of Maryland historian Richard N. Price said that "if the book tends to overstuff its argument, it is also a book that is curiously thin in its conceptualization. Nuance and subtlety are strikingly absent throughout all the key arguments of the book." However, Price also noted that "the author demonstrates an impressive command both of archival research and of the secondary literature."

== See also ==
- Foreign and Commonwealth Office Migrated Archives
- Imperial Reckoning
