= Foreign and Commonwealth Office Migrated Archives =

Collections of documents from Britain's former colonial governments

Coordinates: 52°06′31″N 00°49′16″W

The Foreign and Commonwealth Office Migrated Archives are a collection of about 20,000 files and other records created by the governments of 41 British colonial dependencies, removed to the UK at independence, and held clandestinely for decades in various repositories in and around London. They came only from territories administered by the Colonial Office, so not from India and other dependencies administered by the India Office and its predecessors, whose records are in the India Office Records at the British Library.

The Foreign and Commonwealth Office (FCO) was finally forced to admit the existence of the 'migrated archives' in 2011 during the course of the 'Mau Mau litigation', a case brought against the British government by veterans of the 1952–1960 struggle for independence in Kenya who claimed compensation for ill-treatment and torture. Foreign Secretary William Hague announced in the House of Commons on 5 May 2011 that he intended "to release every part of every paper of interest subject only to legal exemptions". The collection was transferred to the UK National Archives (TNA), and opened to the public, during 2012 and 2013. It is held at TNA under the reference FCO 141. There are redactions and closed and retained items, but it appears that nothing was destroyed during the process of transfer. Unknown quantities of related material were destroyed by the British authorities in the former dependencies during the decolonisation period. It is not known if anything was destroyed after the removal to the UK. Certainly some was lost during the many moves from one building to another.

Because of the circumstances of the release of these records it was initially believed that the entire content was sensitive and potentially incriminating. In fact, content is highly miscellaneous and sometimes mundane. FCO 141 also includes files created by the FCO, TNA, and their predecessors which are about the 'migrated archives' rather than part of them. Material in FCO 141 covers dates between 1835 and 2012.

== Background ==
=== The process of removal/destruction ===
The British government's policy towards 'migrated archives' emerged from a wartime emphasis that sought to keep information valuable to a "potentially hostile power" out of official publications. By 1943 a new file classification system was adopted to define authorised access to files. As ex-dependencies asserted their independence the same policy was adapted to keep information deemed sensitive and potentially embarrassing to the British government from the ministers and officials of the newly formed governments. The first of the 'migrated archives' sent to the UK came from Ceylon (Sri Lanka), which achieved independence in 1948. These records contained 464 volumes of dispatches between successive governors of Ceylon and the Colonial Office in London dating as far back as 1835. Documents in the 'migrated archives' for as many as 11 territories date to the nineteenth century and many more to before the Second World War.

Archival evidence suggests that in the first instance the decision to move records was motivated by 'historical interest' in the records. Later, however, it became evident that the decision to move the records would set a precedent and shape the memory of the Empire. The process of migration, and destruction of files was named Operation Legacy. Sohei Sato states that this was a nomenclature applied at a later stage in the process of the transfer or destruction of documents. Sato calls this an apt name reflecting the colonial government's effort to control the empire's legacy.

Documents that were to be left to post-independence governments, known as "legacy files", were separated from "watch files", which were marked for destruction or repatriation. Africans were forbidden from involvement: only "a servant of the Kenya government who is a British subject of European descent" could participate. The watch-file instructions also made clear to leave no trace of their existence to successor governments: "The legacy files must leave no reference to watch material. Indeed, the very existence of the watch series, though it may be guessed at, should never be revealed." If possible, a dummy file was inserted to ensure file and page numbering was uninterrupted by the cull; when too many dummies were needed, they simply removed or destroyed the entire section.

Before documents were transferred from Ceylon there were debates about whether the documents should be handed over to the new government or to the incoming British High Commissioner to Ceylon. It was eventually decided that secret and personal documents should 'either be destroyed or sent home'. The Ceylon project did not raise any eyebrows. An undated British document stated that there had 'been no reports that there is any local knowledge of records having been removed'. The policy for the migration or destruction of archives was first formalised in the Gold Coast (Ghana). In May 1956 the Colonial Office in Britain, which was overseeing the transfer of power, was apprised by the Governor's Office in the Gold Coast of the decision to set up a committee for scrutinising the records in their custody. The scrutiny would segregate records to be handed over to the new government from records which:

1. would be of no use to a future Gold Coast Government;
2. might embarrass a member of Her Majesty's Government if seen by a Gold Coast Minister; or
3. might embarrass members of the Gold Coast Police or military forces or public servants or who had cooperated with the British; or
4. might compromise sources; or
5. might be used unethically by Gold Coast Ministers.

Ghana achieved independence in 1957, by which time this separation had been successfully effected. This process was subsequently codified in what came to be known later as 'Operation Legacy'. It was successfully adapted and refined to the context of Malaya, Tanganyika, Uganda and Kenya and other colonies that achieved independence in the 1950s and 1960s. The operation in the Gold Coast became the blueprint for directives from the Colonial Office to the colonial governors from 1961 onwards.

=== Development of Colonial Office policy ===
Policy for the destruction or removal of documents in states where the transfer of power was to take place was not initially uniform. Mandy Banton, an expert on the 'migrated archives', writes that there are more differences than similarities in many practices in the British Empire's different colonies that evolved locally over many years. Individual governors and their staffs had a degree of autonomy. Those colonies that became independent in the years up to 1960—Ceylon (Sri Lanka), Gold Coast (Ghana), Malaya (Malaysia) and Nigeria—discussed the disposal of their government records with the appropriate Colonial Office geographical department and with the Colonial Office Librarian who was responsible for the Office's own archives. Early interest in retaining the records or transferring them to the Colonial Office appears to have been motivated primarily for preservation for historical reference. In 1961, responsibility for the 'disposal' of colonial government records was assigned to the Intelligence and Security departments of the Colonial Office. These departments worked closely with the Security Service which oversaw intelligence and security matters in the British dependencies. It was only then that a standard policy emerged. The priorities and the interest in the transfer of the records shifted from archival interest to matters of sensitivity to the Empire's security and the prevention of embarrassment to the UK. Banton quotes C. E. R Darby, who was responsible for the transfer:

"it does not follow that because one paper in an otherwise innocent file would be embarrassing, if passed on to local ministers, the whole file need be withheld ... In the best regulated offices papers have been known to disappear from files leaving no trace but the word 'removed' and a completely illegible signature!"

Standardised instructions were sent first to the East African dependencies in early 1961, and subsequently to those colonies still to achieve independence. The emphasis of the Colonial Office was not primarily on destruction of documents or their transfer to London, but on avoiding passing them to incoming independent governments and peoples who might find information that prejudiced the interests of the departing imperial power. Governors were specifically asked to ensure that certain records were not left for ministers and officials in the incoming independent governments, viz. those which:

- Might embarrass HMG (Her Majesty's Government) or other governments;
- Might embarrass members of the police, military forces, public servants or others (such as police agents or informers);
- Might compromise sources of intelligence;
- Might be used unethically by ministers in the successor government.

Despite the advice passed to the governors, the policy of removing or otherwise disposing of documents was still unevenly executed, as implementation depended largely on the decisions of local officials. The actions of the governors varied wildly. Some were anxious to preserve as much as possible, while others consigned huge quantities to the flames. David Anderson's article, 'Guilty Secrets' describes the anecdotal account of a woman who spent the last weeks as a clerk in Nairobi's Government House in Kenya "taking bundles of documents onto the governor's lawn and stuffing them into a brazier. The fires never ended, she exclaimed with a laugh."

=== Material held in other collections ===
In 1947 India was granted independence from Britain. Prior to this much of the Indian subcontinent and beyond was governed first by the British East India Company (Company rule in India). The British East India Company was founded in 1600 and were initially given exclusive rights to trade in Asia. They then officially governed India between 1757 and 1858, after which the British Crown took over until 1947. At the end of British crown rule in 1947 the territory that Britain ruled over was divided or partitioned into India and a new state of Pakistan (with East Pakistan later becoming Bangladesh).

Many of the records that relate to this extended period of British rule and of the subsequent handover and nation-building at partition are housed in the archives of the British Library India Office.

As Mandy Banton notes in 1947 "the India Office was abolished, and its staff transferred to the CRO. The Indian Records Section (later the India Office Records) and the India Office Library, however, continued to exist as distinct entities."

For the British authorities the task dealing with the wide-range and nature of the documents they had created was problematical. Cahal Milmo describes the now 'infamous' bonfire of documents as British authorities left India, describing a note found in TNA documents for officials to "carefully control any bonfires of secrets" to "avoid a situation similar to Indian in 1947 when the local press was filled with reports about the "pall of smoke" ...over Delhi at the end of the Raj as British officials burnt their papers.". Destruction, as Ian Cobain's book 2016 book 'The History Thieves' details, later became official British policy in colonies in the 1950 and 1960s with regard to the secretive FCO 141 'migrated archives'.

Since 1947 there was a steady stream of demands from the newly formed Indian government requesting the return of the India Office Library from the UK. These many disputes spotlight "independent contestations over the inheritance of an imperial archive, reveals a post-colonial retention regime that resisted both parting with its riches as well as releasing classified documents, and traces the trajectory of a tussle over the centralisation of this corpus". The partition also highlighted the problems relating to partitioning archives relating to the independent countries arising from the partition, for example with the feeling that "Pakistan was created with a deficit not only in funds, armies, bureaucracies, but also in history".

These papers are now housed at the British Library India Office (India Office Records), and the British Library has an India Office Records and Private Papers webpage detailing the collection which contains "14 kilometres of shelves of volumes, files and boxes of papers, together with 70,000 volumes of official publications and 105,000 manuscript and printed maps (which) are complemented by extensive collections of private papers". The British Library recommends Martin Moir's book as "the best single volume guide to the India Office Records, giving the administrative background of the East India Company and the India Office, and detailed descriptions of the different series within the records. It is best used alongside the online and printed catalogues."

== Custody of the archives in the UK ==
The custody of the 'migrated archives' has been a subject of debate for many years. A 1956 statement by an official named A. A. MacKintosh stressed that it was not the practice of the Colonial Office to take over the records of former dependencies. In a few short years that policy was overturned and many files that were considered sensitive were removed to the UK if they had not been destroyed. In 1967 when the Kenyan government requested the return of documents belonging to Nairobi, the British officials asserted that the documents belonged to the UK without admitting that it possessed any migrated records. In 1977 UNESCO, the International Law Commission (ILC) and International Council on Archives (ICA) sought to address claims to displaced archives through an international convention. The UK representative at the ILC was briefed on the position of the Foreign and Commonwealth Office (FCO), the India Office Library, and the Public Record Office (later The National Archives), and was informed that all archives from former colonies had been left behind, with a few small exceptions.

Between 1963 and 1994 the migrated archives were physically stored in Hayes repository; in 1994 they were moved to Hanslope Park, home of Her Majesty's Government Communications Centre, to save on storage costs. In 1967, in 1974, and again in the early 1980s, Kenya asked for them to be released, but the UK refused. In 1982, as Kenya continued to press for the return of its records, the Public Record Office maintained that they were not UK public records under the Public Records Act 1958. It was strongly suggested that the records would be reviewed in 1998, five decades after the first files from Ceylon had been migrated. The assumption was that the files would have been desensitised by the passage of time. Instead the question of disposition of records was discussed in 1995. Anthony Badger, in recounting the fate of the 'migrated archives', states:

"Four options were discussed: destruction, on the grounds that none of the countries had shown any interest in them in the past 12 years; transfer to the Public Record Office, though there was considerable doubt that the PRO would accept them; review and return to the successor governments; or simply hold on to them as property of Her Majesty's Government. In the end, nothing happened: by default the last option prevailed."

The National Archives (TNA) were asked if they would take custody of the records in 2007. TNA responded by saying that any records that were transferred to it would likely be duplicates and that they were happy for them to be destroyed. Junior staff at TNA however flagged that records pertaining to the former dependencies were frequently consulted and it was likely that the 'migrated archives' contained important material even if there were some duplicates. In 2009, the Foreign and Commonwealth Office asked TNA to take over custody of the files again. This time TNA suggested that the files be returned to the former dependencies after review.

While these discussions were ongoing, the Foreign and Commonwealth Office only acknowledged the custody of the 'migrated archives' in 2011 in conjunction with legal inquiry into the Kenya 'Mau Mau' Emergency of the 1950s. That year it admitted that it held about 8,000 files and bound volumes from 37 former British dependencies, a figure later revised to 20,000 from 41 former colonies and territories. In the same year the foreign secretary announced that all items of 'interest' would be transferred to the National Archives. Prior to that announcement, Sir Antony Cary, a former diplomat, was commissioned to produce an internal report on lessons from the experience of the 'migrated archives'. He attributed their delayed release to a failing of management instead of a deliberate conspiracy although scholars like Banton and Sato disagree that such a colossal act of refusal can be attributed solely to mismanagement.

=== Legal status ===
On 22 March 2011, immediately before the FCO finally admitted that the 'migrated archives' were in UK custody, it was advised by its lawyers that they were UK public records. This ruling overturned a legal opinion of 1976 that they were not public records, and terminated decades of discussion within the FCO, and between the FCO and TNA and their predecessors. The FCO refused to provide details of the 2011 legal opinion, citing section 42(1) of the Freedom of Information Act 2000 which protects confidential communications between lawyers and their clients.

The Public Record Office Act 1838 was passed to 'keep safely the public records'. It was then concerned only with legal documents. The legislation was amended in 1877 and 1898, but it was not until the appointment of the Grigg Committee in 1952 and the drafting of the Public Records Act 1958 that there was any attempt to define 'public record'.

In addition to the issue of custody, opening the records would require declassification. Ben Macintyre of The Times summarised the procedure for declassifying Foreign Office archival material as follows:

Under the Public Records Act, documents are liable for release to the National Archives after 30 years. Up to 60 per cent of material is shredded and burnt at this stage. Less than 1 per cent is kept secret. Under the present rules, the Foreign Office may retain documents relating to intelligence, national security and defence. Some files transferred to the archives remain closed if they are deemed potentially harmful to international relations or contain personal information. Any decision to retain official documents is subject to scrutiny by the Lord Chancellor's Advisory Council on National Records and Archives, a panel chaired by Lord Neuberger of Abbotsbury, the Master of the Rolls.

Once at Hanslope, reviewing documents for release was a job for seventeen part-time "sensitivity reviewers", mostly retired Foreign Office officials; it was rare for a file to be judged sensitive enough to warrant withholding it in entirety. When it came to the migrated archives, however, as the question of whether they fell within the scope of the Public Records Act had never been answered, they were left undisturbed and unreviewed.

== Opening of the collection ==
In 2009, Timothy Lovering reported on a conference that looked at the 'expatriation' of records. Although it highlighted the 'disparity of power' between the metropole as the recipient of archival materials and the colonial or postcolonial periphery as the source, at the time of writing, nothing was known about the 'migrated archives' in the FCO, as the article went on to say: "In the UK context, the internal records of former colonial states were routinely passed into the custody of successor national governments." However, in April 2011, The Times reported on a claim made by five elderly Kenyans against the British government in June 2009, alleging mistreatment and torture at the hands of British colonial and military personnel and highlighted the FCO 141 archive, saying: 'Government efforts to cover up one of the darkest episodes in British colonial history have been revealed by the discovery of a vast cache of documents relating to the bloody Mau Mau rebellion in Kenya.' It was this claim that eventually forced the Foreign and Commonwealth Office (FCO) to admit and disclose the existence of 1,500 Kenyan government files removed at independence by one of its predecessors, the UK Colonial Office, and kept in a secret archive in Hanslope Park near Milton Keynes. The FCO also subsequently announced that it held files from 37 former dependencies, initially estimated at 8,800 items but later found to be about 20,000 from 41 former territories and colonies.

=== The Mau Mau court case ===
In November 2002, the Mau Mau Trust—a welfare group for former members of the movement—announced that it would attempt to sue the British government for widespread human rights violations it said had been committed against its members. They asked senior partner Michael Day at Leigh Day to represent the war veterans and over the following years Leigh Day conducted painstaking research into the claims, including joining forces with two prominent historians, Caroline Elkins from Harvard University and David Anderson from Oxford University. In 2009, Leigh Day commenced legal action in the High Court in London representing a number of test case victims of the Mau Mau uprising (1952–1963). The claims arose from the appalling and systematic abuse and torture inflicted on the Kenyan people by British colonial officials, and Kenyan "home guards" under British command, detailing abuse including the use of castration, systematic beatings, rape and sexual assault with bottles; all of which – as the case revealed – were known about and sanctioned at the top levels of the British government. It also showed the British government were rounding up thousands of civilians into mass detention camps all across Kenya and subjecting them to terrible mistreatment, culminating in the Hola Massacre in 1959.

In 2006, lawyers for Leigh Day, the legal firm representing former Mau Mau members who were attempting to sue the UK for their torture during the uprising, submitted a court disclosure request for "a final tranche of documents relating to the suppression of the Mau Mau" that the government was "refusing to release"; the FCO response explicitly denied the existence of this tranche of documents, i.e. the migrated archives, stating that all information they had held had been transferred to The National Archives (TNA).

The case started its journey through the courts. The first ruling came in July 2011, when the presiding judge, Justice McCombe, rejected the Government's argument that the Kenyan government had 'inherited' legal responsibility for these abuses upon their Independence. The case then came to court again in 2012, and again while the government did not dispute that the victims had been tortured "at the hands of the Colonial Administration", they now argued that the case was time barred: meaning that too much time had elapsed since the events took place, so a fair trial was no longer possible.

However, Justice McCombe also rejected this argument. A key part of this rejection was because the colonial powers had kept such meticulous records of what was happening in Kenya that a fair trial was possible. These were the records that had been locked away in Hanslope Park but their existence finally recognised. They revealed, among other things, minutes of British War Councils where policies on interrogation and "screening" were devised, and the advice given by Kenya's Attorney General, Eric Griffith-Jones, to the Governor of Kenya, Sir Evelyn Baring: "if we are going to sin, we must sin quietly".

In mid 2013 the British Government apologised, agreed to pay £19.9 million in compensation to over 5,000 claimants who had suffered abuse during the Mau Mau rebellion, and in addition that the government would finance the construction of a memorial in Kenya to the victims of colonial era torture. Foreign secretary William Hague made a statement to the House of Commons, expressing that the government "sincerely regrets that these abuses took place". The permanent memorial was unveiled in Nairobi in September 2015, commemorating the victims of colonialism.

=== Cary report ===
In 2011 the FCO commissioned Anthony Cary, a former British High Commissioner to Canada (2007–2010) to 'conduct a short investigation into the circumstances surrounding holdings of colonial administration files based at Hanslope Park' and particularly to examine 'what went wrong and what lessons should we draw?'

His terms of reference were directly linked to the Mau Mau case. As background, Cary was informed: 'The FCO gave an understanding to the court that it no longer holds any files relevant to the case. However it has subsequently come to light that there are 294 boxes of records from the former Kenyan colonial government at Hanslope Park, held since the 1990s...'. In consequence, 'Henry Bellingham, the Minister with responsibility for Africa, believes that this is a setback to the credibility of the Foreign office and has investigated an urgent investigation into the circumstances surrounding these oversights'.

Overall, Cary suggested that the 'migrated archives' were not deliberately concealed but had been forgotten as a result of bureaucratic incompetence and lack of institutional memory. However, many FCO staff were fully aware of the collection. It was searched in connection with legal proceedings and questions in parliament or from other government departments, and sometimes to provide information for private researchers.

Cary's conclusions and recommendations are set out in the report under: 'A high level plan for ensuring that similar failings do not reoccur in the future'. As well as addressing the specific questions asked in his terms of reference, Cary suggested that the Foreign and Commonwealth Office should compile an inventory of all its other archival holdings, that is both those awaiting transfer to TNA and the many thousands remaining in a type of limbo. Such an inventory was compiled and updates are made publicly available.

The report entitled 'The Cary Report on the release of colonial administration files' was laid before Parliament in February 2011. On 5 May 2011, William Hague, the then Foreign Secretary, informed Parliament that it was his intention 'to release every part of every paper of interest subject only to legal exemptions'.

Subsequently, The National Archives worked with the Foreign and Commonwealth Office (FCO) to transfer these colonial administration records, which they referred to as the 'migrated archives', into the series FCO 141.

=== Appointment of Professor Tony Badger as independent assessor ===
Professor Anthony Badger was the Independent Reviewer appointed by the Foreign Secretary. In his statement he stated that 'the entire collection of migrated files will be transferred to TNA. None of the papers will be destroyed. Redactions will be kept to an absolute minimum', with the aim being to have all the papers transferred before the end of 2013. The National Archives website page contained an FAQ which described Badger's role as providing "independent oversight of the transfer".

The Foreign Secretary described the role of the independent reviewer in a Written Ministerial Statement to Parliament on 30 June 2011.

Foreign Office Minister David Livington made a series of announcements on plans to transfer the colonial administration files to The National Archives. The first was in December 2011 to confirm the timetable for transfer of these files to The National Archives (TNA) had been approved by Professor Badger. In March 2012 he announced the date of release of the first batch. On 30 November 2012 minister for Europe David Lidington updated Parliament about progress on making the colonial administration files available to the public. At this time, he informed Parliament that a large volume of FCO archive records had come to light which were termed "special collections" and that the Government would publish a high-level inventory of the special collections. On 12 December 2013, he informed Parliament that a high-level inventory of the special collections had been updated with significantly more detail. Also on 12 December 2013, the FCO Minister for Europe William Hague announced in a written statement to Parliament that Professor Badger, who had previously provided independent oversight of the review of colonial administration files over the 2011 to 2013 period, would continue as Independent Reviewer of FCDO non-standard records.

As a response to the disquiet in the press surrounding the amount and release plans for these colonial records, including a letter entitled 'It's vital we have access to the records on Britain's colonial past' signed by British Academy members.

On Thursday 27 February 2014 the Foreign Secretary made a further statement to the House confirming Professor Badger's continued role. On 29 June 2014 a longer page was put on The National Archives UK pages describing the special collections and with a statement from Professor Anthony Badger with a breakdown of the 'special collections'. Archive Inventories were also published.

Professor Anthony Badger spoke about his role in an article from Sept 2012 saying: 'It is difficult to overestimate the legacy of suspicion among historians, lawyers, and journalists about the migrated archive that the Foreign and Commonwealth Office (FCO) collected between the 1950s and 1979.'

The FCO page was later updated to state that "following the merger of the FCO and DFID into the FCDO we will be determining the most effective way to prioritise our integrated collection of non-standard files in consultation with Professor Badger and the independent Advisory Council on National Records and Archives".

=== Transfer and availability at The National Archives ===
In 2012 the process of opening the Foreign and Commonwealth Office (FCO) 'migrated archives' to the public began with the transfer of the records to TNA with a series reference FCO 141. The records were transferred in eight batches between April 2012 and November 2013 following a timetable published online by the Foreign and Commonwealth Office. An archived webpage contains links to guides to the records for each tranche, as well as related podcasts and the Cary Review. According to the current catalogue description, no further accruals are now expected.

The records are available in their original format, although there are redactions and some extracts have been retained at the FCO. There is no evidence that any of the collection was weeded before transfer. The records are available to view free of charge in The National Archives reading rooms, and a fee is charged for digital access which also applies to requests from countries the records were removed from.

With regards to plans to digitise the series, a TNA 'migrated archives' FAQs sheet states that 'The National Archives does not have the funds or resources available to digitise this collection given the scale'.

In 2022, TNA temporarily withdrew the FCO 141 'due to evidence of historical preservation treatment of these files indicating insecticide use'. On Wednesday 21 September 2022, TNA released a public statement that access had been reinstated with new guidelines for reading room users to prevent any potential transfer of substances'.

== Media reaction ==
The Mau Mau case and the release of some of the documents in archives in the UK led to the further revelation that there was a larger tranche of historical records from former British colonies held at Hanslope Park that had been kept out of the public domain. At this time, the only individuals able to view the Kenya content were those directly involved in the court case. This meant that only a handful of expert witnesses in the Mau Mau case, including historians Professor David Anderson (University of Warwick) and Professor Caroline Elkins, were given privileged access to some of the Kenya content and were in a position to publish on their experiences, and did so including in the Journal of Imperial and Commonwealth History issue of December 2011. Elkins, who, like Anderson, is an expert witness for the Mau Mau legal action, highlighted the need for caution, and wrote of her involvement with trying to get files out of the foreign office for analysis back at Harvard: "This process has been anything but straightforward. Despite the legal context, the FCO has culled files, requiring multiple requests for full disclosure, and still files have not been forthcoming." Of the April 2012 release, she noted that it "excludes territories such as Palestine and Rhodesia. The Cyprus files exclude the period of the emergency. The Malaya files cover very little of the contested emergency years. The Kenya documents are a meagre subset of the files released (though culled) in the context of the Mau Mau case. For all 12 colonies covered in today's release, there appears to be a great deal pertaining to finance, tourism, administration and the like. . . . The first release of the 'migrated archives' is, at first glance, lacking in substantive files, particularly for former colonies like Cyprus and Malaya where future lawsuits potentially loom."

Early media reporting in 2011, include a series of pieces in The Times by Ben MacIntyre who wrote from 5–16 April under headlines including "50 Years Later: Britain's Kenya Cover Up Revealed"; "Tales of brutality and violence that could open the claims floodgate"; "One Foreign Office Workers' dogged pursuit of missing Mau Mau Files"; and "Mau Mau and so much more: inside the Foreign Office House of Secrets". A July 2011, Guardian piece sums up the tone of this early reporting which gave visibility to the experience of the plaintiffs as the victims of torture and abuse:

In Kenya there has long been indignation at British cant in refusing to acknowledge that such things happened. The sense that Britain has tried to deny Kenyans their own history by removing documents and concealing them in the bowels of the Foreign Office for more than 50 years has only deepened these resentments.

The piece offers speculation around what 'further horrors' of 'colonial misdeeds' this wider 'hidden history' may reveal and ask broader questions of whether Britain is willing to admit to 'our imperial wrongs' and in the process 'admit that other have rights we may have infringed' calling for a need for a 'post-imperial maturity'.

Cary's report and the documents initially released had shown that, on 3 December 1963, nine days before Kenya formally declared independence, three wooden packing crates containing 1,500 highly sensitive government files were loaded on to a British United Airways flight bound for Gatwick. On the eve of Kenya's independence, Colonial Secretary Iain Macleod ordered that sensitive colonial-government documentation be destroyed or flown out of the country because its disclosure "might embarrass Her Majesty's Government". "Embarrassment hardly covers it," remarked a Times editorial, noting that "the covert history of colonial administration in Kenya bears comparison to the methods of torture and summary execution in the French war in Algeria." In much of the early reporting the scale of what later became FCO 141 was under-estimated and irregularly reported. Many early articles quote a figure of 8,800 files, and up to nearly 10,000. It is now known that the figure is around double this at around 20,000 from 41 former colonial dependencies.

Press attention in relation to Britain's concealment of colonial records was heightened again in the period from April 2012 and November 2013 when FCO 141 was released at The National Archives. Articles in the immediate aftermath of the first release in April 2013 focus on how the records provide extensive evidence of Britain's document destruction practices, and shed light on Britain's 'operation legacy'. A piece by Caroline Elkins in the Guardian on the day of the first release conveys the ongoing sense of suspicion and lack of transparency even as the records were being released to the public:

Warning bells should be going off. The British government went to extraordinary lengths to fashion its colonial archive. The first release of the "migrated archives" is, at first glance, lacking in substantive files, particularly for former colonies like Cyprus and Malaya where future lawsuits potentially loom... Until the FCO offers a full and unredacted release of all files found at Hanslope Park, a healthy dose of scepticism is crucial. If not – much like the benign decolonisation myth of yesteryear – we run the risk of overly applauding today's document release and reinforcing the FCO's myth of new-found transparency.

More recent Guardian articles have included a piece by Ian Cobain, author of The History Thieves: Secrets, Lies and the Shaping of a Modern Nation in which the concealment of the 'migrated archives' is placed within the context of the Black Lives Matter protests of 2020 including the toppling of the statue of slave trader Edward Colston into the harbour in Bristol, which prompted then Prime Minister, Boris Johnson to state that "to tear [these statues] down would be to lie about our history". In response to this Cobain states:

But lying about our history – and particularly about our late-colonial history – has been a habit of the British state for decades.

A 2020 article in the Guardian by Kojo Koram entitled "Britain needs a truth and reconciliation commission, not another racism inquiry" also places the concealment of the 'migrated archives' into the context of a long-standing and ongoing reluctance to confront Britain's imperial legacies or link this legacy to inequalities in the present, when many of the problems being highlighted by Black Lives Matter protestors "from the public monuments celebrating slave traders to the institutional racism of the police, have their roots in empire". Koram argues it is time to properly address the fact that "rather than confronting the legacy of Empire, the British state h[as] quite literally tried to burn it."

== Disputed Archival Claims: An International Survey 2018/19 ==
The International Council on Archives' (ICA) Expert Group on Shared Archival Heritage (EGSAH) conducted a survey between 30 August 2018 and 15 January 2019 on international claims over displaced archives. This is the second international survey of its kind and builds on the work of Leopold Auer's 1998 international survey on disputed archival claims, the results of which was published by UNESCO.

Auer's survey questionnaire was used as the basis for the 2018/9 EGSAH questionnaire. It was revised to reflect changes in technology. The language of the questionnaire was also changed to make it broader in scope than the 1997/8 questionnaire, with the intention of accommodating claims by actors beyond nation states. The survey was open to all, via publication on the ICA website in English and French and circulation via networks and on Twitter.

The data from the 2018/19 survey is not comprehensive since the survey population was self-selecting. Many institutions did not participate in the survey since they were negotiating repatriation. Three national archival institutions did not participate to avoid jeopardising bilateral discussions about repatriation. The survey received a total of 33 responses, of which one was void. It also does not include anecdotal evidence of displacement because they did not constitute a claim. A total of 17 claims related to decolonization were documented of which 8 were against the UK alone.

=== Claims from Kenya ===
According to Professor David Anderson it was obvious to Kenyans that key documents had been removed from the Secretariat by the British before departure after Kenyan independence due to the presence of notes on 'retention' left behind in the documents. However, according to correspondence released routinely under the thirty year rule by the Public Record Office (now The National Archives) in 1999, it was 1967, when the Kenyan government first wrote to the Foreign and Commonwealth Office in London to ask for a full inventory of the 'stolen papers' with a request for these records to be returned to Nairobi.

Professor Anderson asserted that the British response to Kenya's request in 1967 was 'blatantly dishonest'. Within the documents released to the public in 1999, there is clear admission via a minute on the file that a huge collection of 'sensitive documents', comprising more than 1,500 files, had been taken from Nairobi and brought to London in 1963. Despite this internal recognition and awareness, the response to the Kenyan request was that no such collection of Kenyan documents existed, and that the British had removed nothing that they were not entitled to take with them in December 1963. The Cary Report states that the obfuscation and decision not to return the records was based on a combination of a 'thin end of the wedge' argument (if we return some files, we will draw attention to the existence of others) and a 'dangerous 'precedent one' (if we return the files after reviewing them for sensitivity we might find it difficult to withhold unreviewed and potentially sensitive records from other colonies). Kenya also managed to have the question about removed records asked in the parliament in 1971 to which the response was that the files were a 'UK Government interest, not a Kenya colony interest'. The Kenyans made a repeat request for the return of documents in 1974, without success.

The 1996 survey on Disputed Archival Claims prepared by Leopald Auer, discussed below, shows that in 1996, the claim to the Kenyan migrated archive was considered active by Kenya; it was described as:

Kenya - Claim against the United Kingdom for microfilms of records removed from Kenya to the United Kingdom during the process of decolonization. Negotiations between 1970 and 1980. No transfers of copies have taken place, but Kenya has purchased some of the claimed microfilms. The use of the concept of joint heritage to facilitate the solution of the claim might be possible.

The results of the 2018/2019 survey (also described below) indicates that the Kenyan resolve has not altered, yet no progress in negotiations had been possible.

=== Association of Commonwealth Archivists and Records Managers position paper ===
In 2017 the Association of Commonwealth Archivists and Record Managers (ACARM) adopted a position paper on 'migrated archives' at the ACARM Annual General Meeting that took place in Mexico City. The ACARM position states that the 'migrated archives' are the property of the countries from which they were removed and advocates for repatriation. It encourages all of its members to abide by the ICA's Code of Ethics (1996), which states that "archivists should cooperate in the repatriation of displaced archives".

The position paper continues by addressing the British Government:

If repatriation continues to be unacceptable to the British Government, ACARM encourages it to demonstrate transparency by making public the legal opinion of 2011 that is the basis of its decision to retain the records. ACARM also encourages the British Government to demonstrate good will to the governments and peoples with which its history is intertwined by providing free digital copies of the records to the countries from which the records were removed.

=== Position of the Foreign, Commonwealth and Development Office ===
In May 2018 the then Foreign Secretary, Boris Johnson, wrote to a member of parliament setting out the position of his department vis-a-vis claims for the return of the 'migrated archives' to the countries from which they were removed or the free provision of digital copies. He outlined previous statements made about the release of those records and emphasised the impossibility of making public the legal advice about their status. He concluded:

Foreign and Commonwealth Office paper files selected for permanent preservation are transferred to The National Archives. Paper files are not routinely digitised and are publically [sic] available for free at The National Archives and visitors can make their own digital copies of files if they so wish. For those unable to visit The National Archives, digital and paper copies of documents can be ordered with the charges (at cost recovery) agreed with HM Treasury and approved by Parliament.

=== Comparison with claims for return of museum artefacts ===
Demands for the return of artefacts taken from Commonwealth countries and the wider world as a consequence of colonisation or war, and now in European museums, are well publicised. In the British context the best known examples have been the Elgin Marbles and the Rosetta Stone, both in the British Museum, whose return has been demanded by Greece and Egypt respectively for many years. Much more recently other collections have been highlighted such as the Benin Bronzes, also in the British Museum, and the Magdala treasures in the Victoria and Albert Museum, both looted by British troops - in 1897 and 1868 respectively. There is regular media attention, and a growing literature. Although the British Government and the national museums have refused to countenance any return of such artefacts, citing the British Museum Act 1963 and the National Heritage Act 1983, some regional, independent, and university museums have taken a different stance. Museums in France, Belgium, Germany and the United States have returned items from their collections to Africa and elsewhere, or are in the process of doing so.

A similar debate with popular support has been missing from the archival sector presumably because the value of files and papers is more difficult to appraise than objects of apparent beauty and fine craftsmanship, but, as UNESCO has emphasised:

"Archives are an essential part of the heritage of any national community. They not only document the historical, cultural and economic development of a country and provide a basis for a national identity, they are also a basic source of evidence needed to assert the rights of individual citizens."

In Who Owns History the distinguished lawyer Geoffrey Robertson discussed the 1970 Unesco Convention on the Means of Prohibiting the Illicit Import, Export and Transfer of Ownership of Cultural Property – which includes archives – describes its limitations, and not only suggests that it should be re-written, re-debated and re-issued but provides the draft of a new 'Convention for the Repatriation of Important Cultural Heritage'.

== Contents by country ==
=== Overview ===
The National Archives' catalogue identifies material from 41 distinct territories.

FCO 141, Foreign and Commonwealth Office and predecessors: Records of Former Colonial Administrations: Migrated Archives (numbers are of items released to November 2013):

- Aden, 1949–1967, 47 items
- Anguilla, 1967–1972, 274 items
- Bahamas, 1962–1973, 40 items
- Botswana (listed in catalogue as Bechuanaland), 1921–1966, 304 items
- British Indian Ocean Territory and Seychelles, 1930–1976, 275 items
- Brunei, 1847–1965, 927 items
- Cameroon, 1922–1962, 148 items
- Cyprus, 1879–1960, 2859 items
- Fiji (see also Western Pacific), 1931–1970, 29 items
- Gambia, 1932–1965, 93 items
- Ghana (listed in catalogue as Gold Coast), 1932–1964, 274 items
- Jamaica, 1927–1963, 352 items
- Kenya, 1906–1982, 2726 items (including 915 items from the Kenya Land Transfer Programme, 1955–1982)
- Kiribati and Tuvalu (listed in catalogue as Gilbert and Ellice Islands), 1943–1978, 40 items
- Lesotho (listed in catalogue as Basutoland), 1909–1966, 771 items
- Malawi (listed in catalogue as Nyasaland), 1946–1964, 162 items
- Malaysia (listed in catalogue as Malaya), 1884–1963, 821 items
- Malta, 1852–1971, 4359 items
- Mauritius, 1942–1968, 265 items
- Nigeria, 1895–1962, 451 items
- Palestine, 1926–1950, 53 items
- Seychelles (see under British Indian Ocean Territory)
- Sierra Leone, 1943–1961, 64 items
- Singapore, 1847–1963, 2934 items
- Solomon Islands, 1936–1978, 325 items
- Sri Lanka (listed in catalogue as Ceylon), 1835–1948, 694 items
- Swaziland, 1888–1968, 339 items
- Tanzania (listed separately in catalogue as Tanganyika, 1920–1964, 332 items, and Zanzibar, 1888–1964, 327 items)
- Trinidad, 1874–1972, 37 items
- Turks and Caicos, 1945–1973, 26 items
- Tuvalu (see under Kiribati and Tuvalu above)
- Uganda, 1900–1963, 459 items
- Vanuatu (listed in catalogue as New Hebrides), 1936–1982, 280 items
- The National Archives of the United Kingdom 59
- West Indies (records of the West Indian Development and Welfare Organisation and the West Indian Federation), 1940–1963, 262 items
- Western Pacific High Commission, 1884–191978, 59 items
- Zambia (listed in catalogue as Northern Rhodesia), 1924–1964, 583 items
- Zimbabwe (listed in catalogue as Southern Rhodesia), 1959–1968, 15 items

=== Kenya ===
If we are going to sin, we must sin quietly.

— Kenyan Attorney-General Eric Griffith-Jones

Regarding the Mau Mau Uprising, the records included confirmation of "the extent of the violence inflicted on suspected Mau Mau rebels" in British detention camps documented in Caroline Elkins' study. Numerous allegations of murder and rape by British military personnel are recorded in the files, including an incident where an African baby was "burnt to death", the "defilement of a young girl", and a soldier in Royal Irish Fusiliers who killed "in cold blood two people who had been his captives for over 12 hours". Baring himself was aware of the "extreme brutality" of the sometimes-lethal torture meted out—which included "most drastic" beatings, solitary confinement, starvation, castration, whipping, burning, rape, sodomy, and forceful insertion of objects into orifices—but took no action. Baring's inaction was despite the urging of people like Arthur Young, Commissioner of Police for Kenya for less than eight months of 1954 before he resigned in protest, that "the horror of some of the [camps] should be investigated without delay". In February 1956, a provincial commissioner in Kenya, "Monkey" Johnson, wrote to Attorney General Reginald Manningham-Buller urging him to block any enquiry into the methods used against Mau Mau: "It would now appear that each and every one of us, from the Governor downwards, may be in danger of removal from public service by a commission of enquiry as a result of enquiries made by the CID." The April 2012 release also included detailed accounts of the policy of seizing livestock from Kenyans suspected of supporting Mau Mau rebels.

Main criticism we shall have to meet is that 'Cowan plan' which was approved by Government contained instructions which in effect authorised unlawful use of violence against detainees.

— Colonial Secretary Alan Lennox-Boyd

Commenting on the papers, David Anderson stated that the "documents were hidden away to protect the guilty", and "that the extent of abuse now being revealed is truly disturbing." "Everything that could happen did happen. Allegations about beatings and violence were widespread. Basically you could get away with murder. It was systematic", Anderson said. An example of this impunity is the case of eight colonial officials accused of having prisoners tortured to death going unpunished even after their crimes were reported to London. Huw Bennett of King's College London, who had worked with Anderson on the Chuka massacre, said in a witness statement to the court that the new documents "considerably strengthen" the knowledge that the British Army were "intimately involved" with the colonial security forces, whom they knew were "systematically abusing and torturing detainees in screening centres and detention camps". In April 2011, lawyers for the Foreign and Commonwealth Office continued to maintain that there was no such policy. As early as November 1952, however, military reports noted that "[t]he Army has been used for carrying out certain functions that properly belonged to the Police, eg. searching of huts and screening of Africans", and British soldiers arrested and transferred Mau Mau suspects to camps where they were beaten and tortured until they confessed. Bennett said that "the British Army retained ultimate operational control over all security forces throughout the Emergency", and that its military intelligence operation worked "hand in glove" with the Kenyan Special Branch "including in screening and interrogations in centres and detention camps".

The Kenyan government sent a letter to Hague insisting that the UK government was legally liable for the atrocities. The Foreign Office, however, reaffirmed its position that it was not, in fact, liable for colonial atrocities, and argued that the documents had not "disappeared" as part of a cover up. Nearly ten years before, in late 2002, as the BBC aired a documentary on British war crimes committed during the Mau Mau Uprising and 6,000 depositions had been taken for the legal case, former district colonial officer John Nottingham had expressed concern that compensation be paid soon, since most victims were in their 80s and would soon pass away. He told the BBC:

What went on in the Kenya camps and villages was brutal, savage torture. It is time that the mockery of justice that was perpetrated in this country at that time, should be, must be righted. I feel ashamed to have come from a Britain that did what it did here [in Kenya]."

Thirteen boxes of "top secret" Kenya files are still missing.

=== Cyprus ===
The release of material in 2011 sparked legal threats from veterans of EOKA, who fought a guerilla campaign against British rule in Cyprus.

David French also utilised the FCO files on Cyprus from the Migrated Archives to prove that the British did not intentionally use a colonial policy of 'Divide and Rule' to flare up Community Tensions on the Island.

The April 2012 documents suggested that the British never intended peace talks with the rebels to succeed. The UK conspired with its Seychelles colony to deport the troublesome Archbishop Makarios even as the talks took place.

=== Botswana ===
The 2012 release of files from Bechuanaland (now Botswana) included a series of correspondence regarding a 1943 program known as 'Forensic'. Under this programme, the British Ministry of Aircraft Production proposed to test "poison gas [of] a very virulent type" either in South Africa or Bechuanaland; the gas was being produced in South Africa on behalf of the UK government. A site in the Makgadikgadi Pan was provisionally selected, but the project was suspended with the start of the rainy season and was not carried out.

== See also ==
- List of countries that have gained independence from the United Kingdom
- Chuka massacre
- EOKA
- Malayan Emergency
- Mau Mau Uprising

== Bibliography ==
- Anderson, David (2011a). "Mau Mau in the High Court and the 'Lost' British Empire Archives: Colonial Conspiracy or Bureaucratic Bungle?". The Journal of Imperial and Commonwealth History. 39 (5): 699–716. doi:10.1080/03086534.2011.629082. S2CID 159749647.
- Anderson, David M. (October 2015). "Guilty Secrets: Deceit, Denial, and the Discovery of Kenya's 'Migrated Archive'". History Workshop Journal. 80 (1): 142–160. doi:10.1093/hwj/dbv027.
- Anderson, David; Bennett, Huw; Branch, Daniel (2006). "A Very British Massacre". History Today. 56 (8): 20–22.
- Auer, Leopold (1998). Disputed archival claims: analysis of an international survey; a RAMP study (Report).
- Banton, Mandy (2020). "History Concealed, History Withheld: The Story of the Foreign and Commonwealth Office 'Migrated Archives' and the Decades-Long International Search For Redress". Archives: The Journal of the British Records Association. 55 (1): 1–29. doi:10.3828/archives.2020.1. ISSN 0003-9535. S2CID 225933271.
- Bennett, Huw (2011). "Soldiers in the Court Room: The British Army's Part in the Kenya Emergency under the Legal Spotlight". The Journal of Imperial and Commonwealth History. 39 (5): 717–730. doi:10.1080/03086534.2011.629083. S2CID 143277974.
- Cary, Anthony (24 February 2011). "Report on Migrated Archives". Foreign and Commonwealth Office.
- Elkins, Caroline (2011). "Alchemy of Evidence: Mau Mau, the British Empire, and the High Court of Justice". The Journal of Imperial and Commonwealth History. 39 (5): 731–748. doi:10.1080/03086534.2011.629084. S2CID 159551587.
- Hiribarren, Vincent (2023). "Les migrated archives ou l'art de cacher le passé colonial au Royaume-Uni". Genèses. 133 (4): 52–70. doi:10.3917/gen.133.0052. ISSN 1155-3219.
- Lowry, James (2020). Disputed Archival Claims: An International Survey 2018/19 (PDF) (Report).
- Sato, Shohei (2017). "'Operation Legacy': Britain's Destruction and Concealment of Colonial Records Worldwide". The Journal of Imperial and Commonwealth History. 45 (4): 697–719. doi:10.1080/03086534.2017.1294256. ISSN 0308-6534. S2CID 159611286.
