= Diplomatic Wireless Service =

British communications system

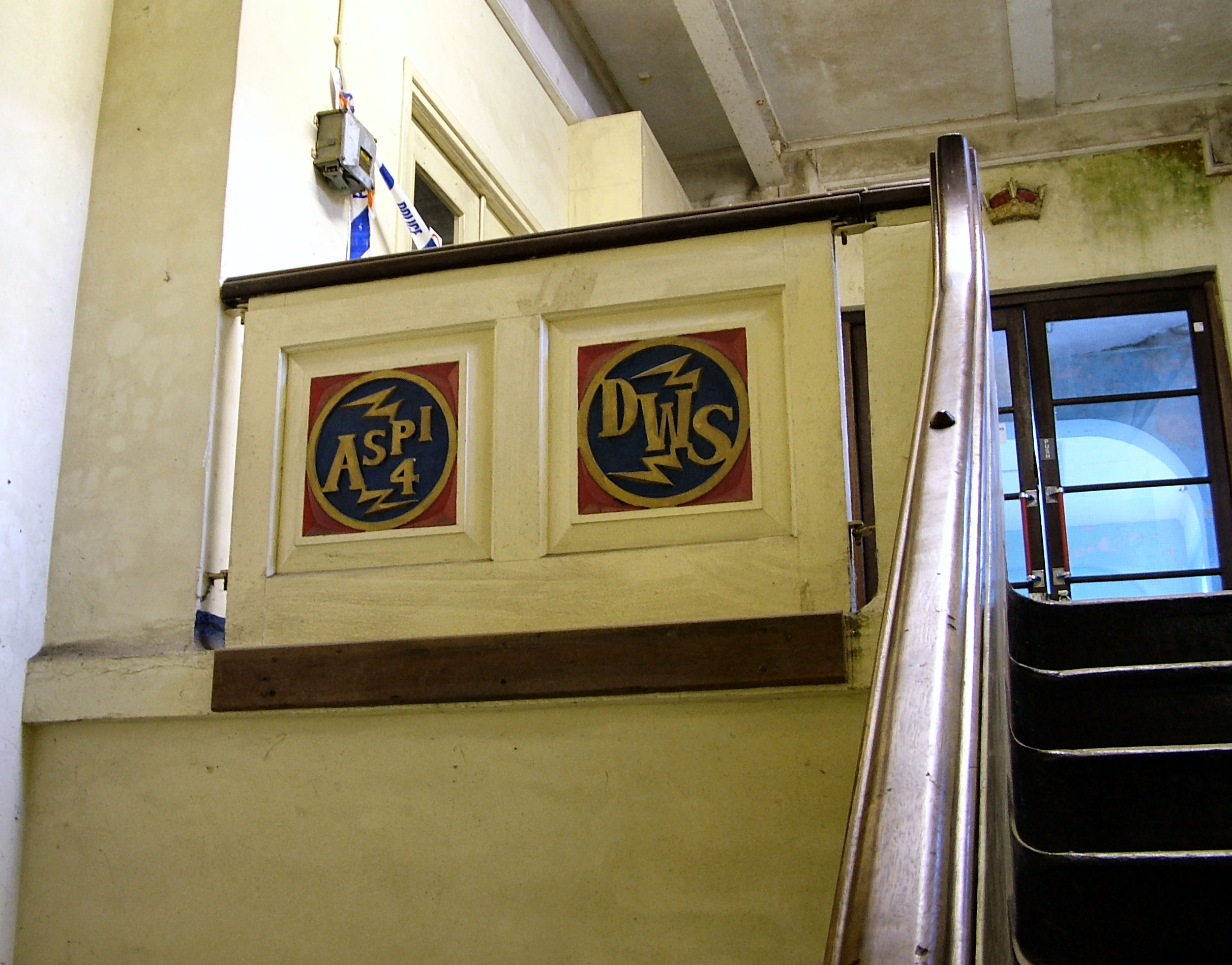
View of the ASPI and DWS logos in a remaining safe building near Crowborough in 2003

The Diplomatic Wireless Service (DWS) was the name of the communications system set up for the British Foreign Office by Brigadier Richard Gambier-Parry, the first Foreign Office Director of Communications, in the latter part of 1945. It grew out of the Special Communication Units (SCU) which were responsible for communications for MI6 during the war. Its original base was at Whaddon Hall in Buckinghamshire, but it moved to Hanslope Park in the winter of 1946/47. The primary role of the DWS was communications between British embassies and the UK, this part of its operations being based at Hanslope Park, which is still the HQ of its successor, His Majesty's Government Communications Centre (HMGCC).

It also operated and maintained transmitters at home and abroad on behalf of the Foreign Office for the broadcasting of the European Service of the BBC and the BBC Overseas Service, which were combined as the BBC World Service in 1988. The main UK broadcast operation was based under the Ashdown Forest near Crowborough in East Sussex. The main transmitter was called 'Aspi 1'. Crowborough was also the engineering base for the overseas relay stations at Zygi, Cyprus known as the British Eastern Mediterranean Relay Station (BEMRS) and Perim and later on Masirah both called the British Middle East Relay Station. This section of the DWS was renamed the Foreign and Commonwealth Office Communications Engineering Division in the mid-1970s and was ultimately transferred to the control of the BBC in 1985.

DWS operators were also involved in radio eavesdropping, the gathering of signals intelligence (SIGINT) for GCHQ, from within the compounds of embassies. The first of these undercover stations was established at Ankara in 1943; another important station was at Stockholm, a location ideally suited for the monitoring of radio traffic from the Soviet Union.

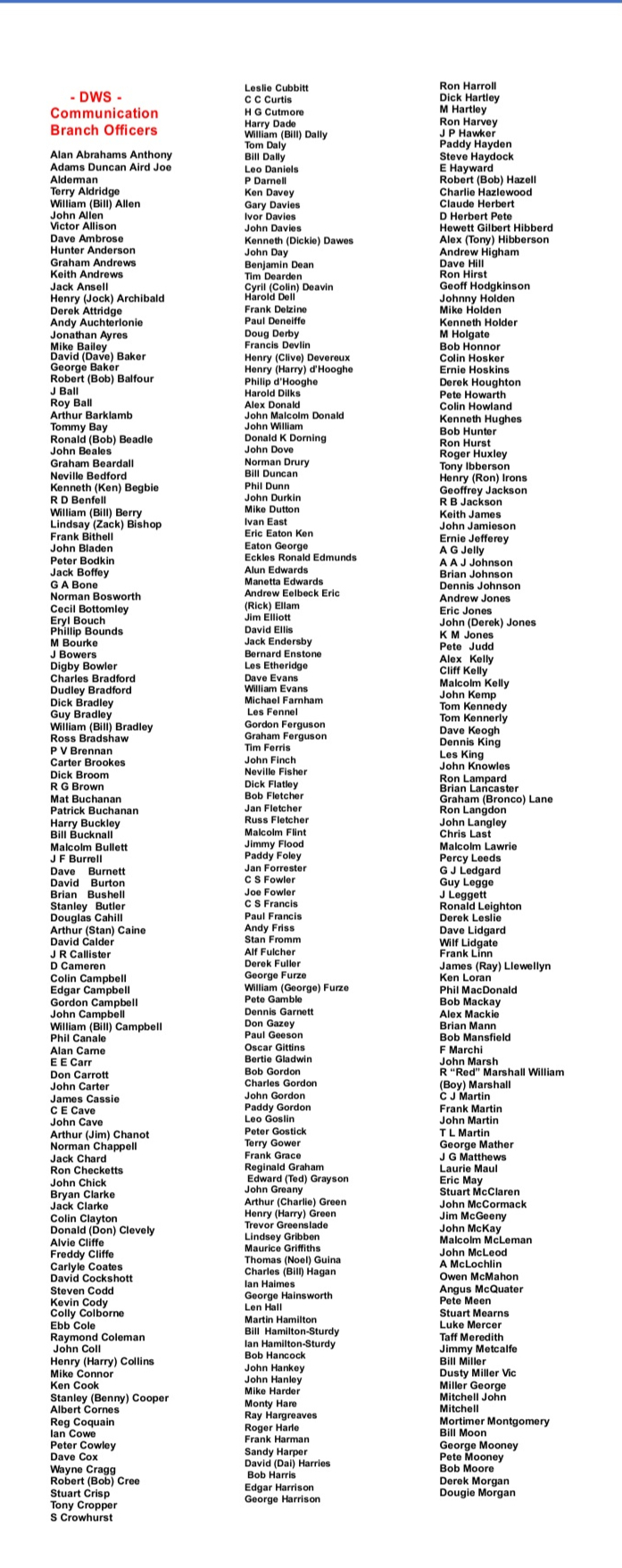
DWS Communications Branch Officers, Hanslope Park, 1947 - 1998
