= MK 328 =

The MK 328 Receiver (Radio Receiver 328R or UK/TRR-328) is a solid-state clandestine subminiature radio receiver developed in 1970 by HMGCC at Hanslope Park as a successor to the older valve-based Mk.301.

It was used in the Cold War by undercover agents and special forces who were operating in denied areas, the MK 328 was an incredibly practical tool. It was entirely self-contained, eliminating the need for cumbersome plug-in coil packs, and was cleverly disguised to look like it was stored in a Tupperware-style container. A coaxial outlet at higher impedance is provided for connecting a tape recorder.
