= Mk 128 =

British military radio system

The Mk 128 / SR128 Station, Radio, 128B is a Cold War-era, valve-based short-wave spy radio set developed in the United Kingdom around 1957–1958 and used by the Diplomatic Wireless Service. It was designed by the Her Majesty's Government Communications Centre (HMGCC) at Hanslope Park for clandestine operations, special forces patrol use, and diplomatic traffic.

== Design ==
The system was engineered for airborne drops and tactical portability. Rather than a single heavy enclosure, the Mk 128B configuration split the station into two independent, unsealed metal boxes to distribute weight—one dedicated transmitter and one highly sensitive superheterodyne receiver. The units were carried inside a specialized canvas carrier bag alongside essential accessories. These included a standard Morse key, crystal frequency controls, headphones, and a compact antenna spool holding 100 feet of wire.
