= Kenya Colony =

British colony (1920–1963)

Colony and Protectorate of Kenya
- 1920–1963
- Ensign of the Colony and Protectorate of Kenya Badge
- Anthem: God Save the King (1920–1952); God Save the Queen (1952–1963)
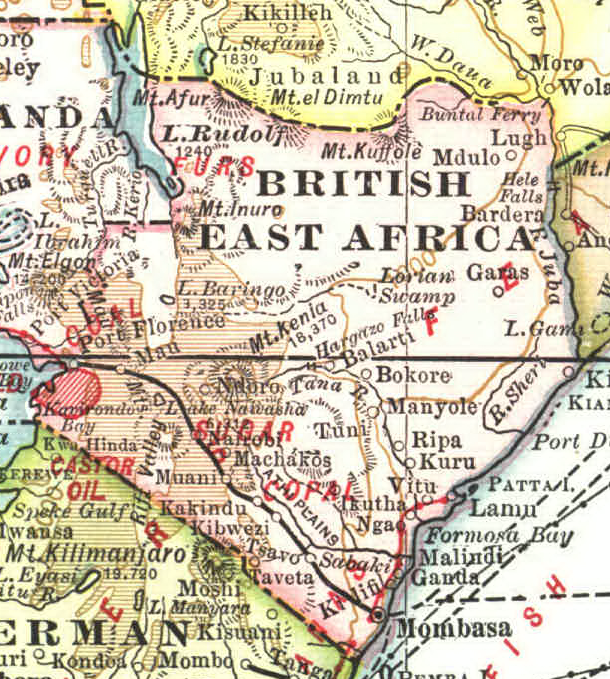
- Map of British East Africa in 1909
- Status: British colony
- Capital: Nairobi
- Common languages: English (official); Swahili, Kikuyu, Kamba, Luhya, Luo, Gusii, Meru, Nandi–Markweta, Somali, Arabic

Government
  - Governor of the Kenya Colony: Edward Northey (first)
  - Governor of the Kenya Colony: Malcolm MacDonald (last)
  - Governor of the Protectorate of Kenya: Ali bin Salim Al-Busaidi (1920–1940)
  - Governor of the Protectorate of Kenya: Mbarak bin Ali Al-Hinawy (1940–1959)
- Legislature: Legislative council
- History
  - Colony established: 23 July 1920
  - Protectorate established: 29 November 1920
  - Self-rule: 1 June 1963
  - Independent as Kenya: 12 December 1963

Area
- 1924: 639,200 km^{2} (246,800 sq mi)

Population
  - 1924: 2,807,000
  - 1931: 3,040,940
  - 1955: 6,979,931
  - 1960: 8,105,440
- Currency: East African florin (1920–21); East African shilling (1921–60)
Preceded by	Succeeded by
East Africa; Protectorate	1924: Italian; Trans-Juba; 1963: Dominion of Kenya
- Today part of: Kenya; Somalia

The Colony and Protectorate of Kenya, commonly known as British Kenya or British East Africa, was a colony of the British Empire located in East Africa from 1920 until 1963. It was established when the former East Africa Protectorate was transformed into a British Crown colony in 1920. Technically, the "Colony of Kenya" referred to the interior lands, while a 16-kilometre (9.9 mi) coastal strip, nominally on lease from the Sultan of Zanzibar, was the "Protectorate of Kenya", but the two were controlled as a single administrative unit. The colony came to an end in 1963 when a native Kenyan majority government was elected for the first time and eventually declared independence.

== History ==
The Colony and Protectorate of Kenya was established on 23 July 1920 when the territories of the former East Africa Protectorate (except those parts of that Protectorate over which His Majesty the Sultan of Zanzibar had sovereignty) were annexed by the United Kingdom. The Kenya Protectorate was established on 29 November 1920 when the territories of the former East Africa Protectorate which were not annexed by the United Kingdom were established as a British Protectorate. The Protectorate of Kenya was governed as part of the Colony of Kenya by virtue of a signed agreement between the Queen of the United Kingdom and the Sultan of Zanzibar dated 14 December 1895.

=== The Protectorate of Kenya ===
The Protectorate of Kenya, also commonly known as the Coastal Protectorate, was the second part of the Colony and Protectorate of Kenya, which existed within the same state, but had a separate legal status to the rest of Kenya. Based in the Coastal province of Kenya, it was legally autonomous, with the Sultan of Zanzibar retaining sovereignty over the territory by legal agreement, like he did with the Sultanate of Zanzibar.

A map of the Coast Province of Kenya

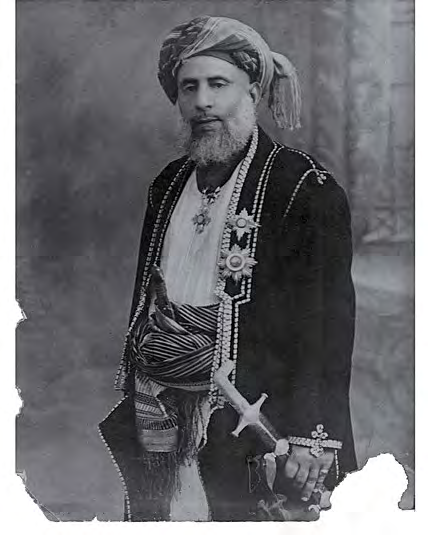
Ali Bin Salim, the first Governor of the Protectorate of Kenya

The governor of the Protectorate was elected by the Qadis, and officially appointed by the Sultan of Zanzibar, with British assent. The Protectorate had the same legal freedoms as the Sultanate of Zanzibar within the empire, but was not a sovereign nation, with the Protectorate being a part of the Colony and Protectorate of Kenya, alongside the Colony. The Protectorate had significant autonomy, having its own police force, courts, and laws, with its inhabitants being protected persons and not subjects, like the citizens of the Sultanate of Zanzibar. Its governors' official, local titles, were Liwali, the Swahili adaptation of the Arabic term Wali or governor in English.

=== History of the Colony of Kenya ===
In the 1920s, Kenyans objected to the reservation of the White Highlands for Europeans, especially British war veterans. Bitterness grew between the Kenyan people and the Europeans. Describing the period in 1925, the African–American historian and Pan-Africanist W. E. B. Du Bois wrote in an article which would be incorporated into the pivotal Harlem Renaissance text The New Negro,

Here was a land largely untainted by the fevers of the tropics and here England proposed to send her sick and impoverished soldiers of the war. Following the lead of South Africa, she took over five million acres of the best lands from the 3,000,000 natives, herded them gradually toward the swamps and gave them, even there, no sure title; then by taxation she forced sixty percent of the black adults into working for the ten thousand white owners for the lowest wage. Here was opportunity not simply for the great landholder and slave-driver but also for the small trader, and twenty-four thousand Indians came. These Indians claimed the rights of free subjects of the empire—a right to buy land, a right to exploit labor, a right to a voice in the government now confined to the handful of whites.

Suddenly a great race conflict swept East Africa—orient and occident, white, brown and black, landlord, trader and landless serf. When the Indians asked rights, the whites replied that this would injure the rights of the natives. Immediately the natives began to awake. Few of them were educated but they began to form societies and formulate grievances. A black political consciousness arose for the first time in Kenya. Immediately the Indians made a bid for the support of this new force and asked rights and privileges for all British subjects—white, brown and black. As the Indian pressed his case, white South Africa rose in alarm. If the Indian became a recognized man, landholder and voter in Kenya, what of Natal?

The British Government speculated and procrastinated and then announced its decision: East Africa was primarily a "trusteeship" for the Africans and not for the Indians. The Indians, then, must be satisfied with limited industrial and political rights, while for the black native—the white Englishman spoke! A conservative Indian leader speaking in England after this decision said that if the Indian problem in South Africa were allowed to fester much longer it would pass beyond the bounds of domestic issue and would become a question of foreign policy upon which the unity of the Empire might founder irretrievably. The Empire could never keep its colored races within it by force, he said, but only by preserving and safeguarding their sentiments.

The population in 1921 was estimated at 2,376,000, of whom 9,651 were Europeans, 22,822 Indians and 10,102 Arabs. Mombasa, the largest city in 1921, had a population of 32,000 at that time.

The Mau Mau rebellion, a revolt against British colonial rule in Kenya, lasted from 1952 to 1960. The rebellion was marked by war crimes and massacres committed by both sides. Caroline Elkins's 2005 book, Britain's Gulag, uncovered that the UK ran concentration camps and "enclosed villages" in Kenya during the 1950s, where nearly the entire Kikuyu population was confined. Many thousands were tortured, murdered, or died from hunger and disease. The British government systematically destroyed almost all records of these crimes, burning them or dumping them at sea in weighted crates, and replaced them with fake files. However, Elkins's book later served as a foundation for successful legal claims by former Mau Mau detainees against the British government for crimes committed in the camps.

The Colony and the Protectorate each came to an end on 12 December 1963. The United Kingdom ceded sovereignty over the Colony of Kenya under an agreement dated 8 October 1963. The Sultan agreed that simultaneous with independence for Kenya, the Sultan would cease to have sovereignty over the Protectorate of Kenya. In this way, Kenya became an independent country under the Kenya Independence Act 1963, which established the independent Commonwealth realm of Kenya, with Queen Elizabeth II as head of state. Mzee Jomo Kenyatta was the first prime minister. On 26 May 1963, Kenya had its first elections and a new red, green, black and white flag was introduced. Exactly 12 months after independence, on 12 December 1964, Kenya became a republic under the name "Republic of Kenya".

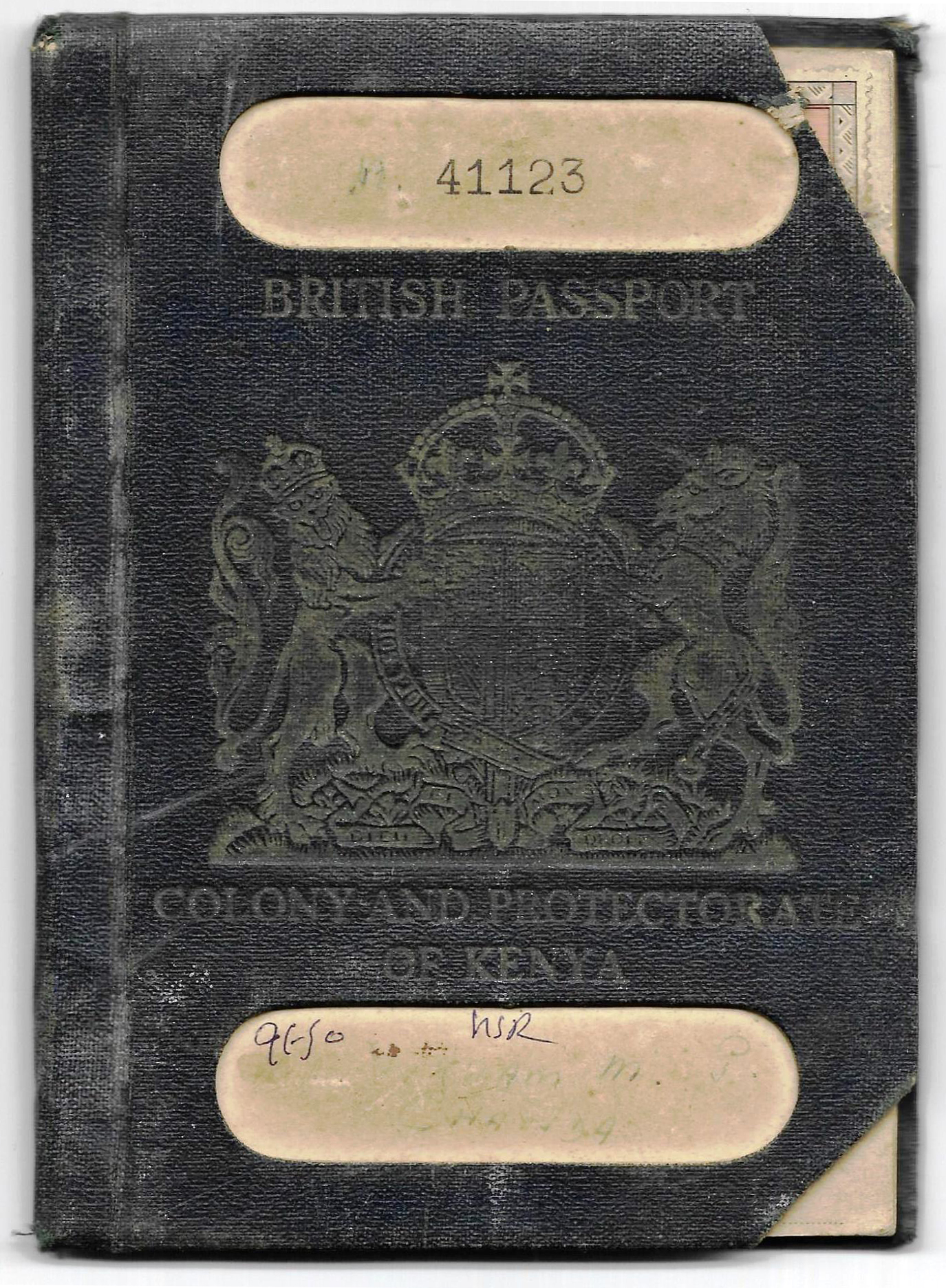
Cover of a Colony and Protectorate of Kenya passport, 1955

== Administration ==
In 1948, the Kenyan government consisted of the Governor, the Executive Council advising him and the Legislative Council. The Executive Council consisted of seven ex officio members, two appointed Europeans, one appointed European representing African interests, and one appointed Asian (Indian) Ambalal Bhailalbhai Patel. The Legislative Council consisted of 16 appointed officials and 22 elected unofficial members.

In 1954, the government was reformed to create a Council of Ministers as "the principal instrument of government". This council consisted of six official members from the civil service, two nominated members appointed by the governor, and six unofficial members appointed by the governor from among the members of the Legislative Council. Of the unofficial members, three were Europeans, two were Asian, and one was African.

The Executive Council continued in existence with all the members of the Council of Ministers also being members of the Executive Council. In addition, the Executive Council also included one Arab and two appointed Africans. The full Executive Council retained certain prerogatives, including approving death sentences and reviewing draft legislation.

The Legislative Council in 1956 consisted of the Governor as president, a Speaker as vice-president and 56 members. Of the 56, eight sat ex officio, 18 were appointed by the Governor and took the government whip, 14 were elected Europeans, six were elected Asians, one was an elected Arab, and eight were appointed Africans sitting on the non-government side. There was one appointed Arab sitting on the non-government side.

Military forces formed in the Colony and Protectorate from the 1880s included the East African Regiment, which became the King's African Rifles; the East African Military Labour Service 1915–1918; the East African Mounted Rifles during the First World War 1914–17; the East African Ordnance Corps; the East African Pay Corps; the East African Pioneer Corps; three East African Reconnaissance Regiments; the East African Artillery the East African Road Construction Corps; the East African Scouts from March 1943, which served as 81st (West Africa) Division's reconnaissance unit in Burma; the East African Signal Corps; the East African Army Service Corps, expanded quickly at the start of the campaign against Italy in 1941 from 300 to 4,600; the East African Transport Corps; the Kenya Armoured Car Regiment; the Kenya Regiment of white settlers; the Kenya Defence Force, and the Kikuyu Guard during the Mau Mau Uprising. Throughout the postcolonial period, Kenya transitioned to a republic that consisted of two legislative chambers that was outlined in their Constitution created in the mid-1960s. Since its implementation, it has been amended to give the region a unicameral assembly that consists of ministers who sit in on the assembly.

== Law ==
Corporal punishment, such as flogging, caning, and birching, was the primary legal punishment for many crimes used in colonial Kenya, particularly against young offenders. Though the metropolitan Colonial Office was sceptical of the use of such punishments, its unease did little to hinder their application by local authorities. Prisons were eschewed by most judges, due to the belief that it would erode the morality of convicts and consign them to a positive feedback loop of criminality. Corporal punishment was also used by government authorities against disobedient local ethnic chiefs, an example of this being the flogging of a Kikuyu chief by Colonel Algernon E. Capell after the latter was lied to by the former.

== Demographics ==
In 1959, towards the end of the colony's days the a majority of the population was African with a minority being European, South Asian, Arab and of other races. By the time of 1948 census the biggest township was Nairobi in terms of population.

Kenya's capital Nairobi grew during this period in terms of its boundaries and population. Nairobi was a multi ethnic though racially segregated city with Europeans living in the western parts while Africans and Asians lived in the southern and western parts of the city as seen in a 1948 master plan for the city. Streets and neighborhood names were a mixture of European and native African names.

Civil population estimate by year
Year	Total population
1946	5,227,000
1947	5,311,000
1948	5,399,000
1949	5,489,000
1950	5,579,000
1951	5,669,000
1952	5,760,000
1953	5,851,000
1954	5,948,000
1955	6,048,000
1956	6,150,000
1957	6,254,000
1958	6,351,000
1959	6,450,000

== Economy ==
The mid to late 1950s were a period of economic growth with the GDP increasing every year and by 1959 towards the end of the colonial period the GDP stood at a provisional number of ₤215.28 million. Agriculture was the largest sector in terms of GDP. The number of unemployed males was highest among Africans toward the end of the colonial period in 1959.

=== Transportation ===
The railroad network grew from 1,779 miles (2,863 km) in 1920 to 4,004 miles (6,444 km) by 1959.

Kenya was serviced by a number of airlines. One of them was Wilson Airways which operated between 1929 and 1940 which went to Nairobi allowing passengers to connect to the Imperial Airways network. This was later succeeded by East African Airways.

=== Media ===
A number of newspapers operated in Kenya. They reflected a variety of positions, languages and different groups in the Colony with newspapers for Indians, Africans and Europeans existing. The press after the Second World War was subjected to a degree of governmental involvement in their operations.

== See also ==
- Mau Mau rebellion (1952)
