= Ali bin Salim Al Busaidi =

Ali Bin Salim Al-Said
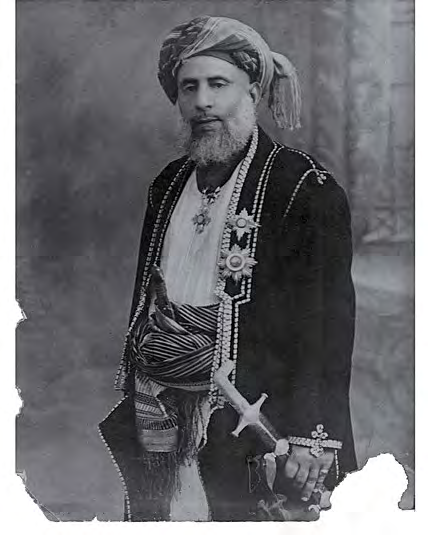
- Ali Bin Salim

1st Governor of the Kenya Protectorate
- In office 23 July 1920 – 12 December 1940
- Deputy: Mbarak Bin Ali Al-Hinawy
- Preceded by: Himself as [Governor of the Coastal Protectorate]
- Succeeded by: Mbarak Bin Ali Al-Hinawy

Sir Ali bin Salim bin Khalfan Al Busaidi (b.~1870 - d.1940) (Arabic: علي بن سالم البوسعيدي) was a prominent Arab figure in the Kenyan colonial history. He is also a member of the House of Busaid that ruled East Africa in the 19th century. His father, Sayyid Salim bin Khalfan Al Busaidi, was the governor of Malindi and then transferred to Mombasa in the late 19th century. Sir Ali al-Busaidi defended the rights of the Arabs in the British colony of Kenya. He established the Seif Bin Salem Library in Mombasa. He played a leading role in establishing the first Arab school in 1912. He also founded another school His name was named in (Malindi).

== Career ==
Ali Bin Salim started his political career when he was appointed as the successor to his father as Governor of Mombasa, by the Sultan of Zanzibar. Ali Bin Salim was a member of the Al-Busaidi royal family.

Ali Bin Salim acted as Liwali / Governor of the Protectorate of Kenya from its creation when the Coastal Protectorate was transitioned to the Protectorate of Kenya, after the East African Protectorate was dissolved. He served in his role until his death in 1940, and he was succeeded by Mbarak bin Ali Al-Hinawy.

Ali Bin Salim established most of the political organizations within the Protectorate of Kenya, which governed itself independently from the Colony of Kenya, and established various organizations to defend the rights of his subjects, mostly the Coasts' Muslim community, made up of both local Arab, Somali and Swahili communities, and settlers from India, notably from the Ismaili community.

== Military Service ==
Ali Bin Salim joined the Kings' African Rifles in the First World War and was almost immediately promoted to Corporal where he served in a leadership position in the East African Campaign, probably due to his royal status. He was assigned to the Arab Rifles, one of the battalions in the Kings' African Rifles at that time, and was the unit that his successor would serve in, Mbarak Bin Ali Al-Hinawy. After the war, be would be made an honorary Captain in the British Royal Navy.

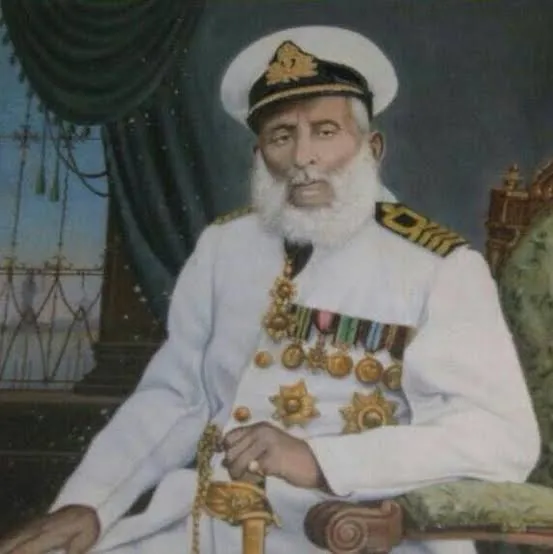
Ali Bin Salim

== Achievements ==
In recognition of his efforts, he was awarded a number of decorations, including the Order of Saint Michael and Order of Saint George for his distinguished civil service during the First World War in 1918 and the Order of the British Empire in 1929, "Knight", or "Sir".

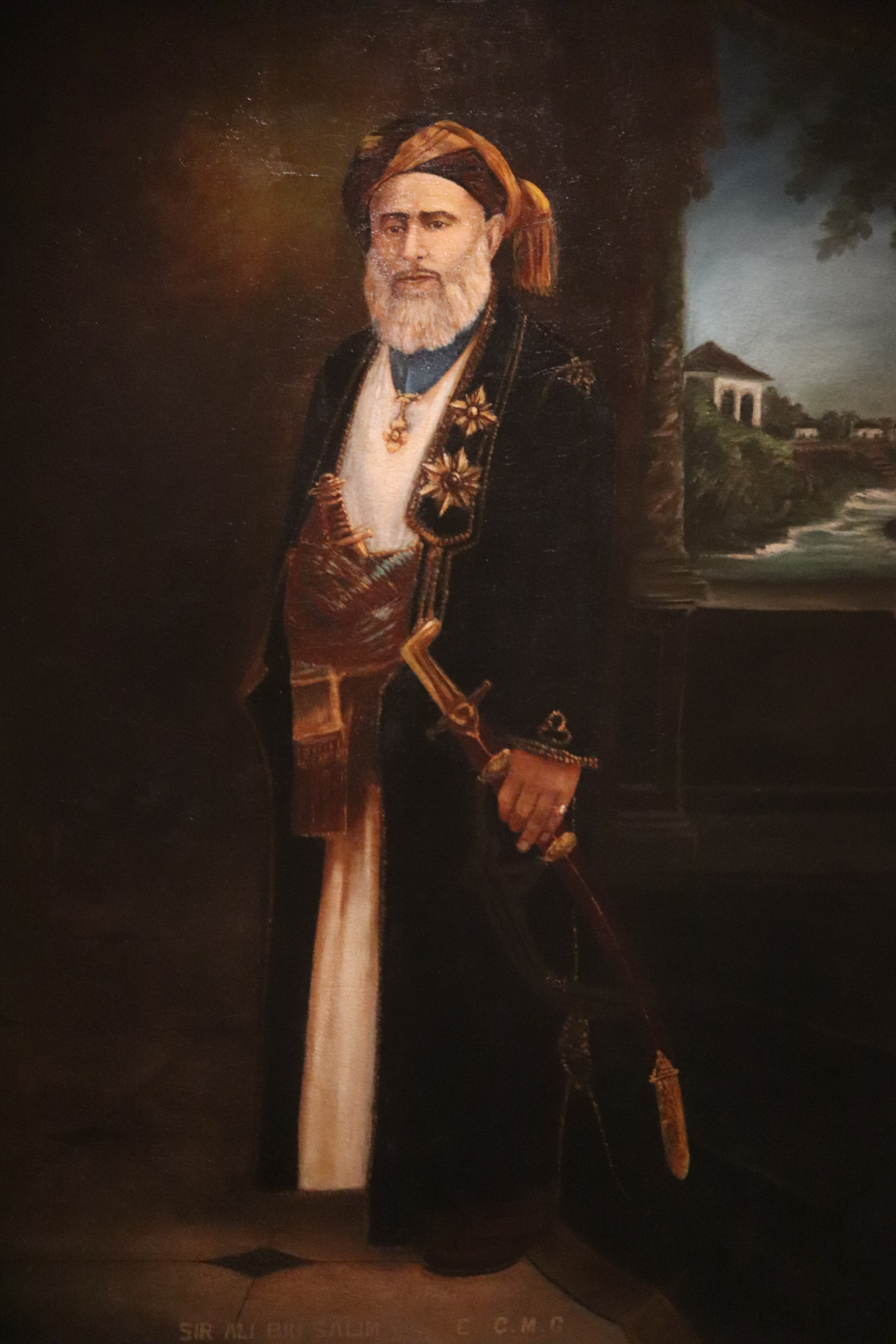
Painting of Sir Ali bin Salim, National Museum (Oman).
