= Chuka massacre =

1953 massacre in Kenya during the Mau Mau uprising

Chuka (Kenya)

The Chuka massacre, which happened in Chuka, Kenya, was perpetrated by members of B Company, 5th Battalion, King's African Rifles (KAR) in June 1953 with 20 unarmed people killed during the Mau Mau uprising.

== The massacre ==
The 5th KAR B Company had been sent to the Chuka area on 13 June 1953, to flush out rebels of the Kenya Land and Freedom Army (Mau Mau) suspected of hiding in the nearby forests. The company commander, Major Gerald Selby Lewis Griffiths of the Durham Light Infantry, set up a base camp from which he directed operations – two platoons would sweep through the forest to flush out the rebels, while African members of the local Kikuyu Home Guard policed the forest boundary. The sweeps were conducted by two junior officers. This was a typical anti-Mau Mau operation.

Two captured Mau-Mau fighters were brought by the soldiers to act as guides to reveal hideouts. When they were questioned, neither were willing to provide information. Major Gerald Griffiths and his two junior officers interrogated the detainees, and when the first prisoner seemed unwilling to co-operate, Griffiths ordered that a hole be made in his ear with a bayonet. A string was passed through the gaping wound, to be used as a tether over the next four days. The second prisoner also proved uncooperative. His ear was amputated on Griffiths' orders, and he was then summarily shot dead. Griffiths would later claim he had been shot while trying to escape.

Over the next two days, the KAR platoons flushed out a number of Mau Mau fighters who were caught by the Home Guard stationed at the forest edge. Then, in the early afternoon of 17 June, a patrol of ten men led by an African warrant officer moved out of the forest and into the surrounding farmland. It came across twelve members of the Home Guard gathered at a farmhouse. For reasons that have never become clear, the twelve men were ordered to lie face down, and were badly beaten. Two of the victims were sent to fetch food for the soldiers and made their escape while the remaining ten were escorted into the forest by the KAR patrol. They reached the soldiers' camp around 4 pm and made to lie face down in a line. At sunset, they were shot where they lay, at close range and in cold blood.

The following morning, 18 June, the warrant officer led his patrol along the forest edge, close to the settlement of Karege. Again it encountered and interrogated a group of Home Guards. The soldiers pillaged food gardens in Karege and shot a farmer before escorting their captives into the forest. African witnesses saw a British officer with the patrol. Early that afternoon, the captives – nine men and one child – were executed in a clearing near a small coffee farm at the forest edge. Soldiers cut off the hands of six of the victims and tucked these into their packs before returning to camp. The final killing occurred between 2 and 3 am the next day, when the surviving guide, still tethered by his ear, was shot, allegedly while trying to escape. At dawn, the soldiers broke camp, heading back to B Company's headquarters at Nyeri, leaving the body of their dead guide.

== Aftermath and trial ==
Days after the massacre, a new commander-in-chief, General George Erskine, arrived in Kenya in June 1953. He quickly sought to change the conduct of the security forces. In a directive to all troops he stated: "I will not tolerate breaches of discipline leading to unfair treatment of anybody," and ordered that "every officer ... should stamp on at once any conduct which he would be ashamed to see used against his own people." However, Erskine took the decision to cover up what had happened.

A military inquiry was convened for the following Monday on 22 June but its findings were never made public. Rumours of what had happened spread, but the colonial government refused to acknowledge the affair publicly. Fragments of information nonetheless found their way into the public record. In an effort to prevent a haemorrhaging of support towards the Mau Mau in the Chuka area, the colonial government authorised the payment of compensation to the families of the murdered villagers. General Erskine then wrote to local chiefs, up to then allies, to reassure them that "investigations have satisfied me that whoever is to blame, it is not any of the persons killed." The army did not pass its findings to the Attorney General, and so prosecutions could not be taken forward "due to lack of evidence".

All of the soldiers involved in the Chuka patrols were placed under open arrest at Nairobi's Buller Camp, but Erskine decided not to prosecute them. Instead, he would make an example of their commanding officer, Major Griffiths. And, rather than risk bringing publicity to the Chuka affair, Erskine was able to obtain evidence to have Griffiths charged with the murder of two other suspects in a separate incident that had taken place a few weeks before the Chuka massacre. However, the 5th KAR soldiers giving evidence at the courts martial in November 1953 refused to speak frankly against Griffiths. He was acquitted of the charge and the rest of the soldiers were not charged. Griffiths was put before a second court-martial following the McLean inquiry's findings charged with the murder of the first guide. In November 1953, he was acquitted.

Following public outcry, however, Griffiths was then tried under six separate charges of torture and disgraceful conduct for torturing two unarmed detainees, including a man named Njeru Ndwega. At his court-martial, it was stated that Griffiths had made Ndwega take off his pants, before telling a teenage African private to castrate him. When the private, a 16-year-old Somali named Ali Segat, refused to do this, Griffiths instead ordered him to cut off Ndwega's ear, to which Segat complied. On 11 March 1954, Griffiths was found guilty on five counts. He was sentenced to five years in prison and was cashiered from the Army. He served his sentence at Wormwood Scrubs Prison in London. None of the other ranks involved in the massacre has been prosecuted.

In a letter to the War Office, in December 1953, now in the UK National Archives, Erskine wrote: "There is no doubt that in the early days, i.e. from Oct 1952 until last June there was a great deal of indiscriminate shooting by Army and Police. I am quite certain prisoners were beaten to extract information." To avoid a scandal, McLean's inquiry drew a veil of official secrecy over the first eight months of the emergency. Though McLean went into the details of the Chuka affair, his final report was a whitewash. He concluded that, whilst there may have been some irregularities in procedures by some units, the conduct of the British Army in Kenya "under difficult and arduous circumstances, showed that measure of restraint backed by good discipline which this country has traditionally expected".

== See also ==
- List of massacres in Kenya
- Foreign and Commonwealth Office migrated archives
