= Hola massacre =

Massacre committed during the Mau Mau Uprising

- Part of Mau Mau Rebellion
- Hola (Kenya)
- Location: 1°30′0″S 40°2′0″E; Hola, Kenya
- Date: 3 March 1959
- Target: Kenyan detention camp prisoners
- Deaths: 11
- Injuries: 77
- Perpetrator: Prison guards commanded by Michael Sullivan

The 1959 Hola massacre was a massacre committed by British colonial forces during the Mau Mau Rebellion at a colonial detention camp in Hola, Kenya.

== Event ==
The Hola camp was established to house detainees classified as "hard-core." By January 1959 the camp had a population of 506 detainees, of whom 127 were held in a secluded "closed camp." This more remote camp was reserved for the most uncooperative of the detainees. They often refused, even when threats of force were made, to join in the colonial "rehabilitation process" or perform manual labour or obey colonial orders. The camp commandant outlined a plan that would force 88 of the detainees to bend to work. On 3 March 1959, the camp commandant put this plan into action – as a result of which 11 of the detainees were clubbed to death by guards. All of the 77 surviving detainees sustained serious permanent injuries.

== Attempted cover-up by colonial officials ==
The first report to surface about this incident was in the East African Standard. The front-page article reported that ten died at the Hola detention camp. The paper quoted the "official statement" from the colonial authorities: "The men were in a group of about 100 who were working on digging furrows. The deaths occurred after they had drunk water from a water cart which was used by all members of the working party and the guards."

More information about the incident emerged in the weeks that followed the initial reports. An investigation into the deaths ensued and it was discovered that the 11 detainees did not die of drinking foul water, but as a result of violence. The medical examiner said, "They had died from either lung congestion or shock and hemorrhage following multiple bruises and other injuries." The coroner reported, "The injuries of a number of Mau Maus apparently were consistent with their allegations that uncooperative prisoners had been beaten by guards, apparently with the consent of the commandant." A report in the June 1959 edition of Time magazine entitled "The Hola Scandal" described the events. The report stated that, on 3 March 1959, 85 prisoners were marched outside and ordered to work but "dozens of the prisoners fell to the ground, refusing to work" and were beaten by the guards. When the assault had concluded, according to the magazine, 11 prisoners lay dying and another 23 needed hospital treatment.

American historian Caroline Elkins covered the Massacre in her 2005 book, Imperial Reckoning: The Untold Story of Britain's Gulag in Kenya. According to Elkins, much of the story of the British and Colonial administration was covered-up during the transition to independence in Kenya, and many official documents had been intentionally destroyed during the transition. Elkins, by carefully tracing available original documents and interviews with surviving Kenyans and colonial staff, indicates that part of Hola Prison was used as a remote punishment camp for 'hard core' Mau Mau insurgents who refused to recant their oaths or affiliation to the movement. Physical and psychological abuse were used to 'break' detainees, so they could be 'rehabilitated' and moved out of the concentration camp pipeline and back to Kikuyu reservations.

Once the inquiry findings were made public, the opposition members in the House of Commons called for a debate. Increasing adverse publicity and calls for further investigations of human rights abuses in the camps led to a reduction in UK governmental support for the Kenya Colony's administration, and resulted in accelerated moves towards Kenyan independence. As recently as 2016, Kenyans were seeking restitution from the British government for torture during the Mau Mau Uprising.

After the massacre, the town of Hola was renamed to Galole by the Colonial Government in order to cover up the massacre. In 1971, in a bid to revive memory of the massacre, President Jomo Kenyatta ordered that Galole revert to its original name. Kenyatta gave this order after he met with a large delegation from Tana River. It has since been named Hola.

Some of the early accounts do not even mention this incident, partly because many of the early accounts are either British government- or colonial-supported publications or secondary texts. Most of the secondary texts published during first decade or so after the Emergency were sympathetic to the British/Colonist/Loyalist point of view.

== Reactions and aftermath ==
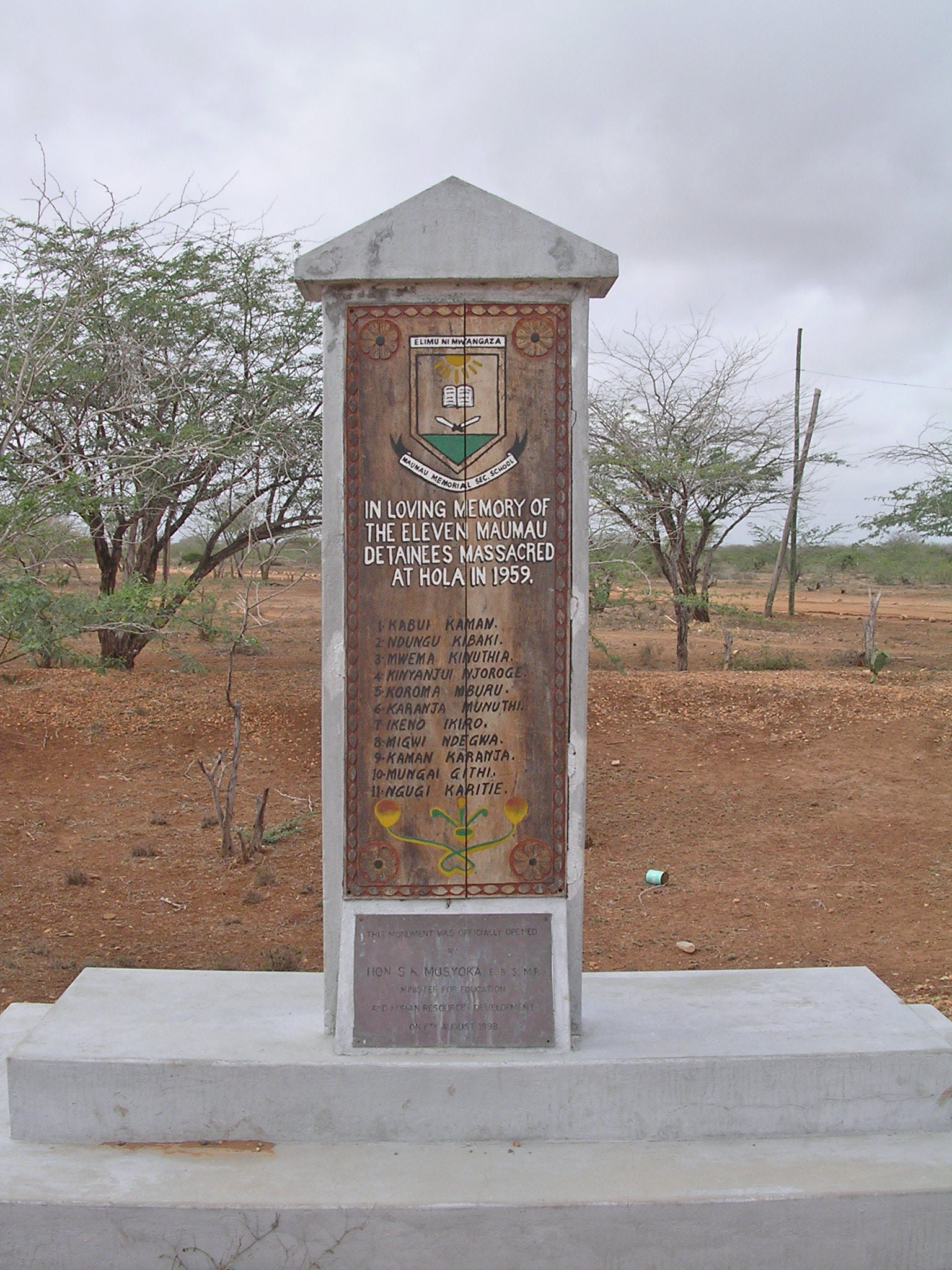
This statue honours the 11 Mau Mau who were clubbed to death at Hola

The massacre caused considerable backlash against the Macmillan government in the House of Commons, where an investigatory committee was convened to investigate the killings. Conservative MP Enoch Powell famously crossed party lines to condemn the massacre, in what Denis Healey later described as "the greatest parliamentary speech I ever heard".

The negative publicity put pressure on the British parliament to take action to salvage Britain's deteriorating image. Colonial detention camps were closed throughout Kenya, and the prisoners were freed soon after. Attempts were then made to find a solution to maintaining British interests in Africa without the use of force, indirectly leading to a hastening of independence across British colonies in Africa.

In British novelist Graham Greene's 1960 novel A Burnt-Out Case, "Hola Camp" is listed alongside Sharpeville and Algiers as a site which had justified Africans in "all possible belief in European cruelty."
