= Operation Legacy =

British programme to destroy records of wrongdoing in former colonies

Operation Legacy was a programme of the British Colonial Office (later Foreign Office) to destroy or hide files that would implicate the British Empire in wrongdoing, as to prevent them from being used by their ex-colonies. It ran from the 1950s until the 1970s, when the decolonisation of the British Empire was at its height, and involved at least 23 countries.

== Methods of operation ==
MI5 or Special Branch agents were required to vet all secret documents in the colonial administrations to find those that "might embarrass" the British Government or members of the colonial administration or show "racial prejudice or religious bias". It was admitted in the House of Lords that the Foreign Office "irregularly" holds 9,500 files from more than 35 former British colonies. Precise instructions were given for methods to be used for destruction, including burning and dumping at sea. Some of the files detailed torture methods used against opponents of the colonial administrations, such as during the Mau Mau Uprising.

As decolonisation progressed, British officials were keen to avoid a repeat of the embarrassment that had been caused by the overt burning of documents that took place in New Delhi in 1946, which had been covered by Indian news sources. On 3 May 1961, Iain Macleod, who was Secretary of State for the Colonies, sent a telegram to all British embassies to advise them on the best way to retrieve and dispose of sensitive documents. To prevent post-colonial governments from ever learning about Operation Legacy, officials were required to dispatch "destruction certificates" to London. In some cases, as the handover date approached, the immolation task proved so huge that colonial administrators warned the Foreign Office that there was a danger of "celebrating Independence Day with smoke".

== Research ==
Research into Operation Legacy has been led by Professor David M. Anderson FBA. Academic study of the end of the British Empire has been assisted in recent years by the declassification of the migrated archives in the Foreign and Commonwealth Office FCO 141 series. After the UK government in 2011 admitted that it had secret documents related to the Mau Mau Uprising, it began to declassify documents and by November 2013 some 20,000 files had been declassified. These documents can be accessed at the National Archives in Kew, London.

== See also ==
- Historical negationism
- Cover-up
- Post-colonialism
- Foreign and Commonwealth Office Migrated Archives
