= Caroline Elkins =

American professor and historian (born 1969)

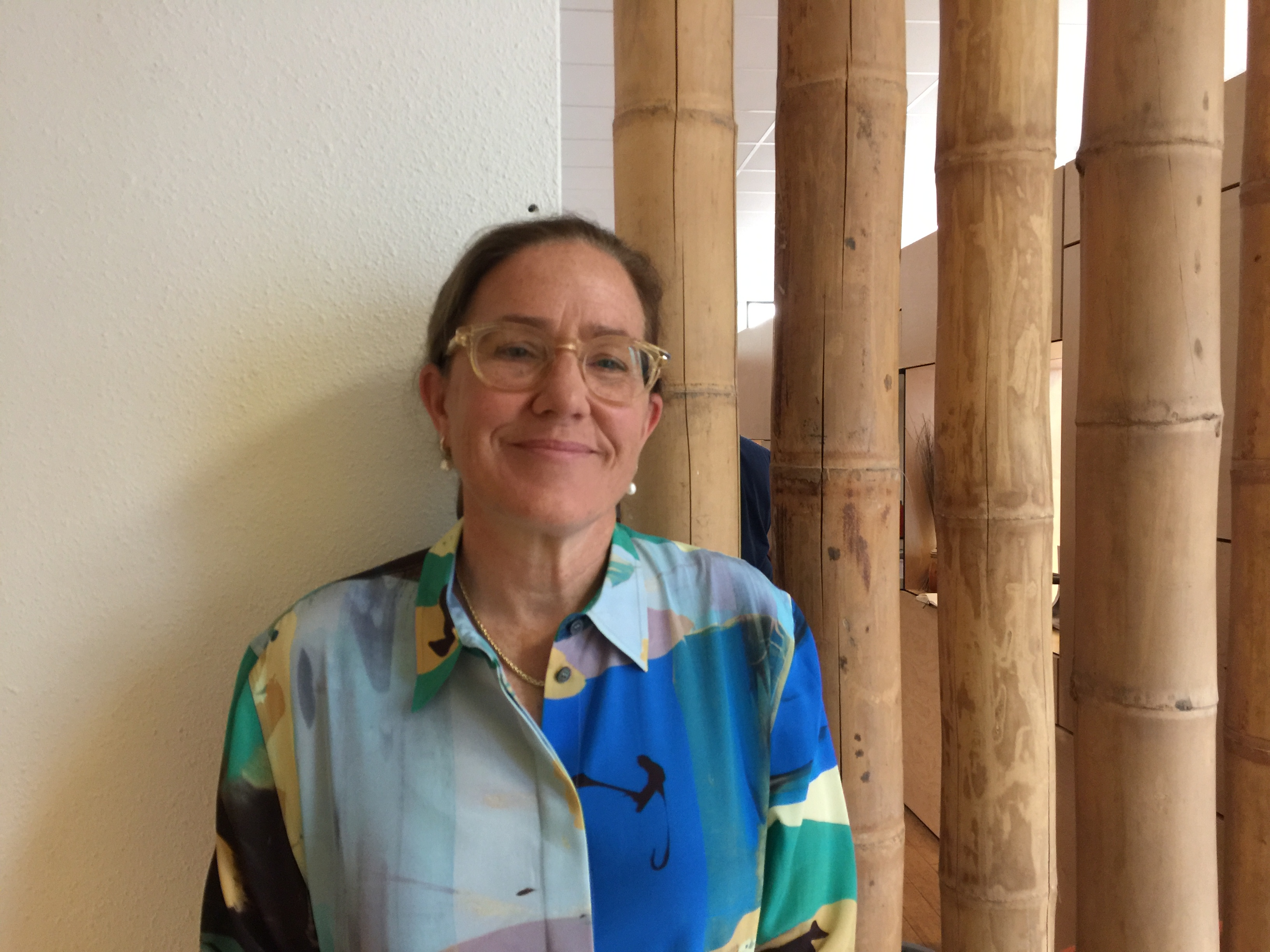
- Born: Caroline Fox; 1969 (age 56–57)
- Occupations: Historian and writer
- Awards: Pulitzer Prize for General Nonfiction; Guggenheim Fellowship

Academic background
- Education: Harvard University; Princeton University

Academic work
- Discipline: Historian, African and African American studies scholar
- Institutions: Harvard University

Caroline Elkins (American, born Caroline Fox, 1969) is Professor of History and of African and African American Studies at Harvard University, the Thomas Henry Carroll/Ford Foundation Professor of Business Administration at Harvard Business School, Affiliated Professor at Harvard Law School, and the Founding Oppenheimer Director of Harvard's Center for African Studies.

Her first book, Imperial Reckoning: The Untold Story of Britain's Gulag in Kenya (2005), won the 2006 Pulitzer Prize for General Nonfiction. It was also the basis for successful claims by former Mau Mau detainees against the British government for crimes committed in the internment camps of Kenya in the 1950s. Elkins's later book, Legacy of Violence: A History of the British Empire (2022), received critical praise, with one reviewer calling it a "tour de force of historical excavation". It was a finalist for the Baillie Gifford Prize for Non-Fiction, selected as one of The New York Times's Top 100 Books of 2022, and named as one of the best books of 2022 by the New Statesman, BBC History, History Today, and Waterstones.

== Biography ==
Raised in Ocean Township, Monmouth County, New Jersey, Elkins graduated from Ocean Township High School in 1987. She was a three-sport varsity athlete (soccer, field hockey, and basketball), winning multiple all-state and all-Shore awards, and recruited at the collegiate level, ultimately deciding to attend Princeton where she played varsity soccer and golf. She was inducted into her high school's athletic hall of fame in 2000.

Elkins is married and has two children.

Elkins has been a professor at Harvard University since she completed her doctoral degree in Harvard's history department in 2001. She received tenure in 2009, and subsequently became the founding director of Harvard's Center for African Studies. She was appointed the Oppenheimer Faculty Director and in her six years as director created one of the world's largest institutions for the study of Africa, raising significant funds and garnering from the United States Department of Education the distinction of a National Resource Center for African Studies. Elkins teaches courses on contextual intelligence, modern Africa, the British Empire, and colonial violence in the 20th century.

=== Mau Mau rebellion ===
Elkins majored in history at Princeton, graduating summa cum laude before moving to Harvard for her master's and doctorate. Her historical methodology, which includes use of written sources as well as ethnographic field work and oral interviews, has led to major revisions in the fields of African and British imperial histories, and has also generated significant criticism, particularly from conservative academics.

Elkins' Harvard PhD was concerned with the detention system employed by the colonial authorities during the Mau Mau rebellion, and served as the basis of the 2002 BBC documentary, Kenya: White Terror, in which Elkins and her fieldwork were profiled. Kenya: White Terror won the International Red Cross Award at the Monte Carlo Film Festival. Elkins's dissertation provided the foundation for her 2005 publication, Imperial Reckoning, which was met with critical acclaim, including from The New York Times, The Washington Post, and The Guardian. In addition to winning the Pulitzer Prize for General Nonfiction in 2006, Imperial Reckoning was named a book of the year by The Economist and an editors' choice by The New York Times, and was a finalist for the Lionel Gelber Prize. In its commendation of Elkins, the Pulitzer Prize Committee wrote: "Imperial Reckoning is history of the highest order: meticulously researched, brilliantly written, and powerfully dramatic." In another review, Bethwell Ogot noted that the book had not been well reviewed by academics, and accused Elkins of dishonesty and criticised her use of unreliable oral testimony.

In 2009, Imperial Reckoning served as the basis for a legal claim filed by five Mau Mau detention camp survivors against the British government, and Elkins became the claimants' first expert witness before being joined by other historians in late 2010 and 2011. The case, known as Mutua and Five Others versus the Foreign and Commonwealth Office (FCO), was heard at the High Court of Justice in London with the Honourable Justice McCombe presiding. London human rights law firm Leigh Day and the Kenya Human Rights Commission (KHRC) in Nairobi were the claimants' legal representatives. During the course of legal discovery the FCO discovered 300 boxes of previously undisclosed files that validated Elkins' claims in Imperial Reckoning and provided thousands of pages of new evidence supporting the claimants' case of gross abuses perpetrated by colonial officials in the detention camps of Kenya in the 1950s.

On June 6, 2013, the British government announced a settlement with the Mau Mau claimants, issuing its official apology of "sincere regret," a £20 million cash payment, and a monument to those tortured during the uprising, unveiled in Nairobi's Uhuru Park in 2015. In the wake of the settlement, Kenyan MP Paul Muite told the press: "Without her research, we would not have been able to mount this suit. The research portion was a momentous task and I credit Elkins for the success of filing the case. We recognised the research and preparatory work (to file the case) had to be perfect."

=== Legacy of Violence ===
Elkins's later book, Legacy of Violence: A History of the British Empire (2022), received starred reviews from Kirkus Reviews, Library Journal, and Publishers Weekly. Reviewers call Legacy of Violence "top-shelf history offering tremendous acknowledgement of past systemic abuses," and "a feat of scholarship that elucidates the bureaucratic and legal machinery of oppression, dissects the intellectual justifications for it, and explores in gripping, sometimes grisly detail the suffering that resulted." Positive reviews and blurbs were written by Rana Mitter, Geoffrey Wheatcroft, Maya Jasanoff, Richard Drayton, Alex von Tunzelmann, John Darwin, Robert Gildea, Priya Satia, Erik Linstrum, Wm. Roger Louis, Jill Lepore, Homi Bhabha, Amitav Ghosh, and Priyamvada Gopal.

In a positive review in the academic journal Race & Class, British historian John Newsinger praises the book's moral and political clarity as well as its treatment of the 1936–1939 Arab revolt in Palestine. Newsinger singled out Chapter 7, "A War of Ideas", as “essential reading." He states that “the only time Elkins falters” is when she describes Hugh Dalton as “a high-minded patrician figure.” Newsinger states this characterization is too generous, given what he sees as Dalton's racist contempt for colonial subjects.

American historian Lauren Benton criticised Legacy of Violence in a review for Foreign Affairs, accusing her of "represent[ing] the empire as a consistently malevolent force", which "leads to a dubious comparison between the so-called liberal imperialism of the British Empire and the fascism of Nazi Germany, overstating the power of an ideology that was never as clear as Elkins wants it to be."

Historian and former British army major Robert Lyman gave it a negative review in the conservative magazine The Critic, calling it "a piece of ideology masquerading as history."

== Selected works ==
=== Articles and book chapters ===
- Elkins, Caroline (2000). "Reckoning with the Past: The Contrast between the Kenyan and South African Experiences". Social Dynamics. 26 (2). doi:10.1080/02533950008458693. S2CID 143334588.
- —— (2000). "The Struggle for Mau Mau Rehabilitation in Late Colonial Kenya". International Journal of African Historical Studies. 33 (1). doi:10.2307/220257. JSTOR 220257.(subscription required)
- —— (2003). "Detention, Rehabilitation, and the Destruction of Kikuyu Society". In Odhiambo, E. S. Atieno; Lonsdale, John (eds.). Mau Mau and Nationhood: Arms, Authority and Narration. Oxford: James Currey. ISBN 978-0-85255-484-5.
- —— (2011). "Alchemy of Evidence: Mau Mau, the British Empire, and the High Court of Justice". The Journal of Imperial and Commonwealth History. 39 (5). doi:10.1080/03086534.2011.629084. S2CID 159551587.

=== Books ===
- —— (2005). Imperial Reckoning: The Untold Story of Britain's Gulag in Kenya. New York: Henry Holt.
- ——; Pedersen, Susan, eds. (2005). Settler Colonialism in the 20th Century: Projects, Practices, Legacies. New York: Routledge.
- —— (2022). Legacy of Violence: A History of the British Empire. New York: Alfred A. Knopf.

== See also ==
- Fitz de Souza – Kenyan lawyer quoted by Elkins in Imperial Reckoning
- Foreign and Commonwealth Office Migrated Archives – document collection which Caroline Elkins and David Anderson used to research for the Mau Mau court case
