= Imperial Reckoning =

Book by Caroline Elkins

- Author: Caroline Elkins
- Publisher: Henry Holt
- Publication date: 2005
- ISBN: 0-8050-8001-5

Imperial Reckoning: The Untold Story of Britain's Gulag in Kenya, published in the UK as Britain's Gulag: The Brutal End of Empire in Kenya, is a 2005 nonfiction book written by Caroline Elkins and published by Henry Holt. It won the 2006 Pulitzer Prize for General Nonfiction.

== Overview ==
The book describes how, after Operation Anvil, the British colonial government in Kenya turned increasingly to mass detention as a means to suppress the Mau Mau Uprising. Elkins details the establishment and running of the detention camps, the torture and abuse that took place there, and the attempts by the British to destroy records on the eve of Kenya's independence, after having covered up such incidents as the Hola massacre.

This book was also released under the title Britain's Gulag: The Brutal End of Empire in Kenya, published by Jonathan Cape in 2005.

== Bibliography ==
- Imperial Reckoning: The Untold Story of Britain's Gulag in Kenya, Henry Holt/Jonathan Cape, 2005, ISBN 0-8050-8001-5
