= HM Government Communications Centre =

United Kingdom government organisation

His Majesty's Government Communications Centre

Agency overview
- Formed: 1938
- Jurisdiction: Government of the United Kingdom
- Headquarters: Hanslope Park, Milton Keynes, MK19 7BH, England, United Kingdom; 52.1055°N 0.80990°W
- Minister responsible: Ed Miliband, Foreign Secretary
- Agency executive: Simon Fabri, Chief Executive
- Parent department: Foreign, Commonwealth and Development Office
- Website: www.hmgcc.gov.uk

His Majesty's Government Communications Centre (HMGCC) is an organisation which provides electronics and software to support the communication needs of the Government of the United Kingdom. Based at Hanslope Park, near Milton Keynes in Buckinghamshire, it is closely linked with the Foreign, Commonwealth and Development Office and the British intelligence agencies.

== History ==
HMGCC was founded in 1938, specialising in overseas bespoke wireless communications. HMGCC used to have a communications centre at Signal Hill near Gawcott, in Buckinghamshire. Stephen Ball was Chief Executive until 2000, when Dr John Widdowson took over; Widdowson moved to GCHQ in 2005. Sarah-Jill Lennard was CEO from 2008 to 2011. Juliette Wilcox was CEO from 2019 to 2021.

== Structure ==
The organisation provides bespoke solutions to fit the needs of the government, its organisations, and specifically its intelligence assets. As of 2024, HMGCC had teams in the following areas:

- Software engineering
- Manufacturing
- Corporate and support
- Project and programme management
- Systems engineering
- Hardware engineering

== See also ==
- GCHQ
- MI5
- MI6
- Bletchley Park
- Hanslope Park
