= John Newsinger =

British historian and academic

John Newsinger (born 21 May 1948) is a British historian and academic who is an emeritus professor of history at Bath Spa University.

Newsinger is a book reviewer for Race & Class and the New Left Review. He is also author of numerous books and articles, as well as studies of science fiction and of the cinema. He teaches on both undergraduate and postgraduate courses.

Newsinger assisted as a historical consultant on the BBC TV series on Scotland and the Empire. He has been guest speaker at the Folkestone Literary Festival (2006), guest speaker at the Brighton Holocaust Memorial Conference and Plenary Speaker at the Socialist Historians' Conference in London (2007). He is a member of the following historical societies: Society for the Study of Labour History; Irish Labour History Society; Military History Society of Ireland; and the US Military History Society.

Newsinger is a member of the Socialist Workers Party, speaking at their Marxism Festival in 2014 and participated in meetings for the Socialist Alliance.

== Education ==
- B.A., University of Hull,
- M.A., University of Leicester.

== Bibliography ==
- Fenianism in Mid-Victorian Britain (1994)
- Dangerous Men: The SAS and Popular Culture (1997)
- Shaking the World: John Reed's Revolutionary Journalism (editor) (1999)
- Orwell's Politics (1999)
- The Dredd Phenomena: Comics and Contemporary Society (1999)
- United Irishman: The Memoirs of James Hope (editor) (2000)
- British Intervention and the Greek Revolution (2002)
- British Counterinsurgency: from Palestine to Northern Ireland (2002) [second edition:2015]
- Rebel City: Larkin, Connolly and the Dublin Labour Movement (2004)
- The Blood Never Dried: A People's History of the British Empire (2006) [second edition:2013]
- Cambridge Companion to George Orwell (2007) - a chapter on George Orwell and the Holocaust
- America Right or Wrong: The Labour Party and Uncle Sam's Wars (2009)
- Fighting Back - the American Working Class in the 1930s (2012).
- Jim Larkin and the Great Dublin Lockout of 1913 (2013).
- Them and Us : Fighting the Class War 1910–1939 (2015).
- Sylvia Pankhurst, the Easter Rising and the Woman's Dreadnought (2016)
- The Revolutionary Journalism of Big Bill Haywood : On the picket line with the IWW (2016).
- 1917: Russia's Red Year (with Tim Sanders) (2016)
- One Big Union of All the Workers: Solidarity and the Fighting IWW (2017)
- Hope Lies in the Proles: George Orwell and the Left (2018).
- Boris Johnson: A Dangerous Man (2019)
- Chosen By God: Donald Trump, the Christian Right and American Capitalism (2020)
- A Rebel's Guide to George Orwell (2021)
