= Hanslope Park =

Government installation in England

Coordinates: 52°06′18.0″N 00°48′32.4″W

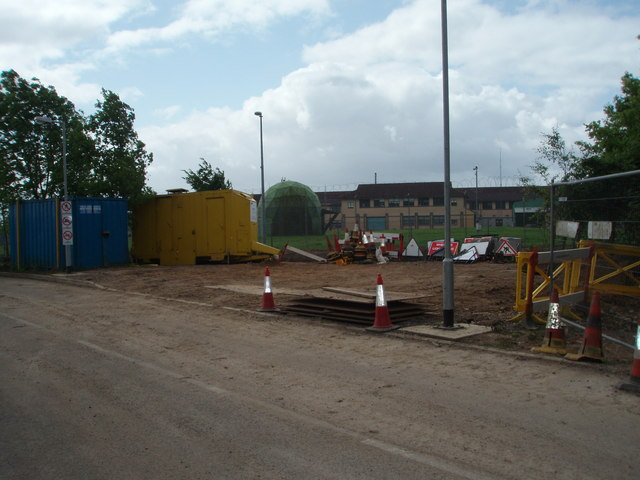
Construction work at Hanslope Park

Hanslope Park is located about half a mile south-east of the village of Hanslope in the City of Milton Keynes, Buckinghamshire, England. Once the manorial estate of the village, it is now owned by the UK Foreign, Commonwealth and Development Office (FCDO), and is also home to His Majesty's Government Communications Centre ('HMGCC') and FCDO Services.

== History ==
The manor was part of the jointure property of Anne of Denmark. Repairs were ordered to the lodge and barns in 1608. A new manor house was built for Basil Brent in 1692. It was acquired in Autumn 1764 by Edward Watts, son of William Watts, who had been a senior official in the East India Company, and of his wife, better known as Begum Johnson. Having passed down the Watts family, it was the scene of a murder on 21 July 1912 when William Farrow, Edward Hanslope Watts's gamekeeper, shot his master and then committed suicide. Robin Watts owned the house until 1939, when it was bought by Lord Hesketh who handed it over to the War Office when it was requisitioned in 1941.

In the Second World War the Radio Security Service was based at Hanslope Park. The mathematician and cryptologist Alan Turing worked there in the latter part of the war on secure speech "scrambling". Today HMGCC researches, designs, develops and produces communications systems, equipment and related hardware and software.

== Foreign and Commonwealth Office archives ==
Hanslope Park gained publicity in 2011 for its extensive collection of Imperial records held as part of the Foreign and Commonwealth Office's archive of Colonial Office papers, the papers relevant to the issue being referred to as the Foreign and Commonwealth Office migrated archives. It was described by Caroline Elkins as "the fortress-like warehouse for top-secret government files".

These archives produced documentation that, unlike other papers, was never made public in the National Archives. These included details of the 1952 to 1960 Mau Mau uprising against British rule in Kenya, and their disclosure led to compensation being paid to people who had been maltreated at Hola camp and other places.

In 2014, following reporting by the Guardian, a group of journalists were allowed to visit the Foreign and Commonwealth Office's archives at Hanslope Park, and briefed on the issues relating to the declassification of the archive material, estimated to comprise roughly 1.2 million documents.

The British government published guidance and a report on the scope of the task, including details of a rough timeline for the "weeding" and declassification process, originally in 2013 and updated from time to time.
