= Lauren Benton (historian) =

American historian

Lauren A. Benton
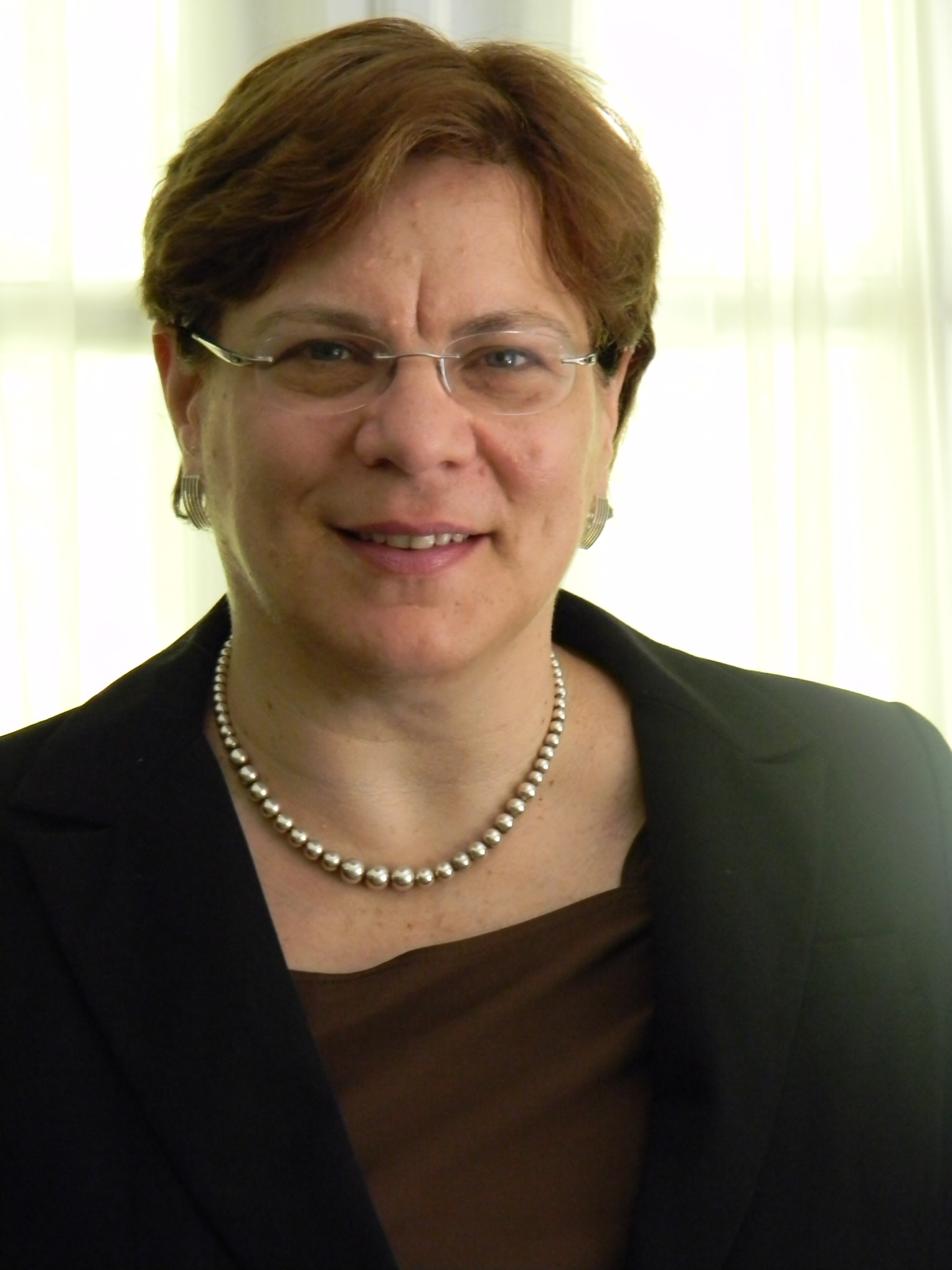
- Born: 1956 (age 69–70); Baltimore, Maryland, U.S.
- Occupation: Historian
- Awards: Toynbee Prize (2019)

Academic background
- Education: Harvard University (BA); Johns Hopkins University (PhD)

Academic work
- Institutions: Yale University; Vanderbilt University; New York University
- Notable ideas: jurisdictional politics, legal posturing, middle power, interpolity law

Lauren Benton (born 1956) is an American historian known for her works on the global history of empires, colonial and imperial law, and the history of international law. She is Barton M. Biggs Professor of History and Professor of Law at Yale University.

== Biography ==
Lauren Benton grew up in Baltimore, Maryland, and attended high school at the Park School of Baltimore in Brooklandville, Maryland. She graduated from Harvard University and received a Ph.D. in Anthropology and History from Johns Hopkins University in 1987.

Benton was professor of history at New York University and professor of history and law at Vanderbilt University before joining the faculty at Yale. She served as Dean for Humanities and Dean of the Graduate School of Arts and Sciences at New York University and as Dean of the College of Arts and Sciences at Vanderbilt University.

In 2019, Benton received the Toynbee Prize for significant contributions to global history.

== Research ==
Benton's book Law and Colonial Cultures: Legal Regimes in World History, 1400–1900 mapped a novel perspective centered on the study of jurisdictional conflicts in colonial societies. Introducing the term “jurisdictional politics,” Benton analyzed the impact of colonial legal conflicts on global legal regimes, state formation, and the rise of the modern international order.^{[7]} In 2003, Law and Colonial Cultures was awarded the World History Association's Jerry Bentley Book Prize^{[8]}, the James Willard Hurst Book Prize.^{[9]}, and the PEWS Immanuel Wallerstein Memorial Book Award from the American Sociological Association.

Benton's book A Search for Sovereignty: Law and Geography in European Empires, 1400-1900 showed that empires did not seek to control vast overseas territories but instead used varied legal practices to claim and control a patchwork of enclaves and corridors. A Search for Sovereignty introduced the term “legal posturing” to describe attempts by imperial agents, including pirates, to show that they were serving the interests of sovereign sponsors. The book also traced the influence of legal conflicts in European empires on definitions of sovereignty and other elements of early international law.^{[10]}

Rage for Order: The British Empire and the History of International Law, 1800-1850, coauthored with Lisa Ford, uncovers a vast project of global legal reform in the early nineteenth century. Benton and Ford introduce the terms "middle power" and "vernacular constitutionalism" in describing global ordering. The book argues that imperial law prefigured international law and the rise of the interstate order.

They Called It Peace: Worlds of Imperial Violence (Princeton University Press) traces the way imperial small wars made global order. It argues that pervasive practices of plunder and of imperial intervention set the stage for atrocities.

Before becoming a scholar of imperial history, Benton wrote about culture and economic development. Her book Invisible Factories: The Informal Economy and Industrial Development in Spain examined industrial restructuring and the “informal sector,” or underground economy, in Spain during the transition to democracy of the 1970s and early 1980s.^{[5]} Benton also co-edited a volume with Alejandro Portes and Manuel Castells on the informal sector in comparative economic development.^{[6]}

Benton continues to investigate historical processes of regional and global ordering. Her work connects the study of empires and the history of international law by studying what Benton calls "global legal politics." She coined the term "interpolity law" to refer to global patterns of legal interactions in eras before the rise and proliferation of nation-states.

== Selected published works ==
Books

- They Called It Peace: Worlds of Imperial Violence, Princeton University Press, (2024).
- Lauren Benton, Bain Atwood, and Adam Clulow, eds, Protection and Empire: A Global History, Cambridge University Press, 2017.
- Lauren Benton; Lisa Ford (3 October 2016). Rage for Order: The British Empire and the Origins of International Law, 1800–1850. Harvard University Press. ISBN 978-0674737464.
- Lauren Benton; Richard J. Ross (22 July 2013). Legal Pluralism and Empires, 1500-1850. NYU Press. ISBN 978-0-8147-0818-7.
- Lauren Benton (30 November 2009). A Search for Sovereignty: Law and Geography in European Empires, 1400–1900. Cambridge University Press. ISBN 978-1-107-78271-6.
- Lauren Benton (2002). Law and Colonial Cultures: Legal Regimes in World History, 1400-1900. Cambridge University Press. ISBN 978-0-521-00926-3.
- Lauren A. Benton (1990). Invisible Factories: The Informal Economy and Industrial Development in Spain. SUNY Press. ISBN 978-0-7914-0223-8.
- Alejandro Portes, Manuel Castells, and Lauren Benton, eds., The Informal Economy: Studies in Advanced and Less Developed Countries (Baltimore: Johns Hopkins University Press, 1989).

Selected Articles

- Lauren Benton and Adam Clulow, “Protection Shopping among Empires: Suspended Sovereignty in the Cocos-Keeling Islands,” Past & Present, 257:1 (2022): 209-247.
- “Beyond Anachronism: Histories of International Law and Global Legal Politics,” in Journal of the History of International Law (January, 2019), 1-34.
- “The Legal Logic of Wars of Conquest: Truces and Betrayal in the Early Modern World,” 28 Duke Journal of Comparative & International History (2018):425-448.
- “The Space of Political Community and the Space of Authority” Global Intellectual History, 3.2 (2018): 254-265.
- Lauren Benton and Lisa Ford, “Island Despotism: Trinidad, the British Imperial Constitution, and Global Legal Order,” Journal of Imperial and Commonwealth History, 2017 (http://www.tandfonline.com/doi/abs/10.1080/03086534.2017.1379671)
- “Shadows of Sovereignty: Legal Encounters and the Politics of Protection in the Atlantic World,” in Alan Karras and Laura Mitchell (eds.), Encounters Old and New in World History: Essays Inspired by Jerry H. Bentley (University of Hawaii Press, 2017), 136-150.
- “Empires and Protection: Making Interpolity Law in the Early Modern World,” with Adam Clulow, Journal of Global History, 12:1 (2017: ): 74–92.
- “Legal Encounters and the Origins of Global Law,” with Adam Clulow, in Jerry Bentley, Sanjay Subrhahmanyam, and Merry Wiesner-Hanks (eds.), Cambridge History of the World, 2015, Vol. 6Part II, 80-100.
- “This Melancholy Labyrinth: The Trial of Arthur Hodge and the Boundaries of Imperial Law,” Alabama Law Review (2012): 100-1222.
- "Possessing Empire: Iberian Claims and Interpolity Law," in Saliha Bellmessous, ed., Native Claims: Indigenous Law Against Empire, Oxford University Press (2011):19-40.
- “Abolition and Imperial Law, 1780-1820,” Journal of Commonwealth and Imperial History, 39:3, (2011): 355-374.
- "Toward a New Legal History of Piracy: Maritime Legalities and the Myth of Universal Jurisdiction," International Journal of Maritime History XXIII, 1 (2011): 1-15.
- “Acquiring Empire by Law: From Roman Doctrine to Early Modern European Practice,” with Benjamin Straumann, Law and History Review 28:1 (2010): 1-38.
- “From International Law to Imperial Constitutions: The Problem of Quasi-Sovereignty, 1870-1900,” Law and History Review 26:3 (2008): 595-620.
- “Legal Spaces of Empire: Piracy and the Origins of Ocean Regionalism,” in Comparative Studies in Society and History, 47:4 (2005): 700-724.
- "From the World Systems Perspective to Institutional World History: Culture and Economy in Global Theory." Journal of World History 7:2 (1996): 261-95.

== Selected Awards ==
- Berlin Prize Fellow, 2021–22
- 2019 Toynbee Prize
- Guggenheim Foundation fellowship, 2019
- 2003 World History Association Jerry Bentley Book Award
- 2003 James Willard Hurst Prize
- PEWS Immanuel Wallerstein Memorial Book Award
