= Timeline of Radio Luxembourg =

This is a timeline of Radio Luxembourg.

== 1920s ==
- 1924
  - Radio Technician François Anen builds a 100-watt transmitter in his home in the Grand Duchy of Luxembourg.
- 1925
  - No events.
- 1926
  - The government of Luxembourg reaches an agreement to subsidise the station to broadcast military music concerts and plays performed in the Luxembourgish language.
- 1927
  - No events.
- 1928
  - No events.
- 1929
  - 11 May – A group of mainly French entrepreneurs form the Luxembourg Society for Radio Studies (La Société Luxembourgeoise d'Études Radiophoniques) as a pressure group to force the Luxembourg government to issue them a commercial broadcasting licence.

== 1930s ==
- 1930
  - 19 December – The government of Luxembourg passes a law awarding a monopoly licence to operate a commercial radio broadcasting franchise from the Grand Duchy. On 29 December, this licence was awarded to the Society, which in turn created the Luxembourg Broadcasting Company (Compagnie Luxembourgeoise de Radiodiffusion) to be identified on the air as Radio Luxembourg.
  - 29 December – The licence is awarded to the Society, which in turn created the Luxembourg Broadcasting Company (Compagnie Luxembourgeoise de Radiodiffusion) to be identified on the air as Radio Luxembourg
- 1931
  - No events.
- 1932
  - May – Radio Luxembourg begins high-powered test transmissions aimed directly at Britain and Ireland. following the opening of the Junglinster Longwave Transmitter.
- 1933
  - 3 December – Radio Luxembourg launches its English-language service.
- 1934
  - 1 January – a new international agreement, the Lucerne Convention or European Wavelength Plan (which the Luxembourg government refused to sign) comes into effect, and shortly afterwards Radio Luxembourg starts a regular schedule of English-language transmissions from 8:15 am to midnight on Sundays, and at various times during the rest of the week.
- 1935
  - No events.
- 1936
  - No events.
- 1937
  - No events.
- 1938
  - No events.
- 1939
  - 21 September – The Luxembourg government closes the radio station to protect the neutrality of the country during World War II.

== 1940s ==
- 1940
  - The station and its transmitters are taken over by the invading German forces in 1940, and are used for English-language propaganda broadcasts by William Joyce (known as Lord Haw-Haw) and others.
- 1941
  - No events.
- 1942
  - No events.
- 1943
  - No events.
- 1944
  - When Allied forces took over Luxembourg in September 1944, the station is transferred to US Army control and used for black propaganda purposes for the remainder of the war.
- 1945
  - May –The future of Radio Luxembourg is debated. The BBC did not welcome the idea of renewed commercial competition if the facilities were turned back to commercial control and a plan is devised to redirect the station towards communist Eastern Europe and the Soviet Union by linking the Luxembourg transmitters via landline to BBC World Service studios in London. This plan falls apart after Churchill's Conservative Party lost to the Labour Party in the postwar British General Election.
  - Summer – The Luxembourg transmitters remains under American control and are used both to relay programs for the Voice of America and originating programming under the call sign identifier of the "United Nations Station".
  - November – Radio Luxembourg is handed back to the Grand Duchy.
- 1946
  - No events.
- 1947
  - No events.
- 1948
  - No events.
- 1949
  - No events.

== 1950s ==
- 1950
  - No events.
- 1951
  - 2 July – The English programmes of Radio Luxembourg move from long wave to the medium wave frequency of 208 metres (1439 kHz).
- 1952
  - No events.
- 1953
  - No events.
- 1954
  - No events.
- 1955
  - December – The Marnach transmitter becomes operational and transmissions of Radio Luxembourg are switched to this transmitter. It uses a directional transmitter to allow for improved transmissions of the daytime German service.
- 1956
  - Barry Alldis is appointed as Radio Luxembourg's chief announcer.
  - The transmission power of the Marnach mediumwave transmitter is increased to 350 kW.
- 1957
  - No events.
- 1958
  - No events.
- 1959
  - No events.

== 1960s ==
- 1960
  - From around this year, the station's output is more explicitly targeted at the growing teenage market, with increasing emphasis on pop music. Drama productions, comedy, variety and sports programming is removed.
- 1961
  - No events.
- 1962
  - No events.
- 1963
  - No events.
- 1964
  - 28 March – Radio Caroline, a "pirate" radio station set up by Ronan O'Rahilly broadcasting from MV Caroline anchored in international waters off Felixstowe, debuts as Europe's first all-day English-language pop music station. May more pirate stations start up in the next year or so.
- 1965
  - No events.
- 1966
  - June – Radio Luxembourg enters into a deal with teenage magazine Fabulous to carry its programme listings and related items, and the magazine is retitled Fabulous 208 - 208 metres being Radio Luxembourg's broadcast wavelength.
  - Barry Alldis leaves. Don Wardell replaces him as the station's chief announcer.
- 1967
  - 14 August – The Marine Broadcasting Offences Act is passed, making it an offence to advertise or supply an offshore radio station from the UK. As well as closing down offshore "pirate radio", the British government instructed the BBC to create its own non-commercial replacement, named Radio 1.
  - 30 September – BBC Radio 1 begins broadcasting, albeit as a part-time service. While Luxembourg again almost had the UK commercial airwaves to itself, it was still restricted to evening and night hours.
- 1968
  - No events.
- 1969
  - No events.

== 1970s ==
- 1970
  - No events.
- 1971
  - No events.
- 1972
  - No events.
- 1973
  - September – After 40 years, Luxembourg gets its first legalised commercial radio competition when the first two Independent Local Radio stations launch - Capital Radio and LBC.
- 1974
  - No events.
- 1975
  - Barry Alldis returns, and stays with the station until his death in 1982.
- 1976
  - No events.
- 1977
  - No events.
- 1978
  - November – The frequency of Radio Luxembourg’s broadcasts changes from 1439 kHz to 1440 kHz to conform with the Geneva Frequency Plan of 1975.
- 1979
  - No events.

== 1980s ==
- 1980
  - 27 September – The final edition of Fabulous 208 is published.
- 1981 to 1987
  - No events.
- 1988
  - Autumn – Radio Luxembourg's audience is hit by the launch of all-day FM broadcasts of BBC Radio 1 in many parts of the UK.
- 1989
  - Hoping to build a new audience, Luxembourg in English returns with a daytime schedule for the first time since the early 1950s, but this time it is aimed at Scandinavian audiences using a 24-hour stereo transponder on the Astra 1A satellite to supplement the 208 analogue night-time service.
  - 1 September – Radio Luxembourg's parent company RTL Group teams up with Raidió Teilifís Éireann to launch Atlantic 252, an English-language pop music station on longwave, based in Ireland and with advertising content aimed at a UK audience. Initially the station only broadcast until 7 pm and ended transmissions with an announcement encouraging listeners to switch to Radio Luxembourg.

== 1990s ==
- 1990
  - August – Atlantic 252 begins evening broadcasting and the end-of-transmission announcement about Radio Luxembourg is no longer aired on that station.
- 1991
  - 30 December – At 3 am GMT, Radio Luxembourg ends its broadcasting on MW. The transmitter is then used to broadcast German station RTL Oldie Radio.
- 1992
  - 30 December – After a year as a satellite-only station, Radio Luxembourg finally closes down. The closedown night is relayed on various stations, including the old 208 wavelength.
