= List of tallest structures in Luxembourg =

A list of the tallest structures in Luxembourg. The list contains all types of structures.

== Tallest skyscrapers ==
Rank	Name	Image	Commune	Height m (ft)	Floors	Year	Remarks
1	Court of Justice of the European Union: Tower III (Rocca Tower)		Luxembourg City	118 m (387ft)	31	2019	
2	Court of Justice of the European Union: Tower II (Montesquieu Tower)		Luxembourg City	107 m (351ft)	25	2008	
2	Court of Justice of the European Union: Tower I (Comenius Tower)		Luxembourg City	107 m (351ft)	25	2008	
3	Infinity Living		Luxembourg City	104 m (341ft)	27	2020	
4	Jean Monnet 2		Luxembourg City	93 m (305ft)	24	2026	Under construction
5	University of Luxembourg: Maison du Savoir		Esch-sur-Alzette	83 m (272ft)	20	2015	
6	ArcelorMittal: K22		Luxembourg City	80 m (262ft)	22	2027	
7	Alcide De Gasperi building		Luxembourg City	77 m (253ft)	23	1966	
8	DoubleTree by Hilton Luxembourg		Luxembourg City	74 m (243ft)	20	1984	
9	RBC Investor Services building		Esch-sur-Alzette	73 m (239ft)	19	2009	
10	Porte de l'Europe: Tower A		Luxembourg City	68 m (223ft)	18	2004	
10	Porte de L'Europe: Tower B		Luxembourg City	68 m (223ft)	18	2004	

== Other Structures ==
Construction	Year	Structural type	Town	Pinnacle height		Coordinates	Remarks
FM- and TV-mast Hosingen	1972	Guyed Mast	Hosingen	300 m	984 ft	50°1′14.6″N 6°6′17.27″E	
Longwave transmitter Beidweiler	1972	Guyed Mast	Beidweiler	290 m	951 ft	49°43′42.57″N 6°19′4.29″E ; 49°43′49.2″N 6°19′15.02″E ; 49°43′55.81″N 6°19′25.67″E	3 masts
Dudelange Radio Tower	1957	Tower	Dudelange	285 m	935 ft	49°27′48.25″N 6°5′45.12″E	
Longwave transmitter Junglinster	1932	Tower	Junglinster	216 m	708 ft	49°43′0.35″N 6°15′28.9″E ; 49°43′6.56″N 6°15′40.27″E ; 49°43′12.75″N 6°15′51.44″E	3 towers, insulated against ground
Heiderscheid-Kehmen Wind turbines	2006	Wind turbine	Heiderscheid-Kehmen	133 m	436 ft	49°53′36.86″N 6°1′3.46″E ; 49°53′24.86″N 6°1′5.62″E ; 49°53′9.19″N 6°1′11.82″E ; 49°53′35.58″N 6°1′28.74″E ; 49°53′30.27″N 6°0′10.99″E ; 49°53′32.53″N 6°0′33.43″E ; 49°54′1.94″N 6°0′44.65″E	7 units, type Enercon E-66/18.70, 3 smaller wind turbines nearby
Burer Bierg Wind Turbines	2008	Wind turbine	Mompach	133 m	436 ft		4 units, type Enercon E 70-E4
Esch Steel Mill Plant, Large Sinter Chimney		Chimney	Esch	115 m	377 ft	49°30′15.21″N 5°56′24.5″E	unused
Marnach transmitter, daytime antenna		Guyed mast	Marnach	105 m	344 ft	50°2′46.71″N 6°4′36.66″E ; 50°2′46.78″N 6°4′41.63″E ; 50°2′43.58″N 6°4′41.73″E	demolished
Esch Blast-Furnace		Blast-Furnace	Esch	101 m	331 ft	49°30′6.9″N 5°56′53.29″E	
