= Tower array =

Arrangement of multiple radio towers

A tower array is an arrangement of multiple radio towers which are mast radiators in a phased array. They were originally developed as ground-based tracking radars. Tower arrays can consist of free-standing or guyed towers or a mix of them. Tower arrays are used to constitute a directional antenna of a mediumwave or longwave radio station.

The number of towers in a tower array can vary. In many arrays all towers have the same height, but there are also arrays of towers of different height. The arrangement can vary. For directional antennas with fixed radiation pattern, linear arrangements are preferred, while for switchable directional patterns (usually for daytime groundwave versus nighttime skywave), square arrangements are chosen.

== Examples ==
=== Tower arrays with guyed masts ===
- Longwave transmitter Europe 1
- Transmitter Weisskirchen
- Beidweiler Longwave Transmitter
- Transmitter Wachenbrunn
- Transmitter Ismaning (VoA-Station)

=== Tower arrays with free-standing towers ===
- Junglinster Longwave Transmitter
- Orfordness transmitting station

== See also ==
- Directional antenna
- Directional array
- Longwave
- Medium wave
