= Radio Luxembourg =

Multilingual commercial broadcaster in Luxembourg

- Country: Luxembourg
- Launch date: 3 December 1933; 92 years ago
- Dissolved: 30 December 1992; 33 years ago

Radio Luxembourg was a multilingual commercial broadcaster in Luxembourg. It is known in most non-English languages as RTL (for Radio Television Luxembourg).

The English-language service of Radio Luxembourg began in 1933 as one of the earliest commercial radio stations broadcasting to both the United Kingdom and Ireland. The station provided a way to circumvent British legislation which until 1973 gave the BBC a monopoly of radio broadcasting on UK territory and prohibited all forms of advertising over the domestic radio spectrum. It boasted the most powerful privately owned transmitter in Europe (200 kW, broadcasting on long wave). In the late 1930s, and again in the 1950s and 1960s, it had large audiences across Britain and Ireland with its programmes of popular entertainment, and was an important forerunner of pirate radio and modern commercial radio in Britain.

Radio Luxembourg's parent company, RTL Group, continued its involvement in broadcasts to a UK audience with the British TV channel then known as Five until it was sold in July 2010.

== Background and origins ==
In 1922, the British government awarded a monopoly broadcasting licence to the British Broadcasting Company (BBC), whose shares were owned by British and American electrical companies. Although in theory the BBC could have sold sponsored airtime, its income instead came from selling its own brand of licensed radio receivers manufactured by its owners. This arrangement lasted until 1927, when the broadcasting licence of the original BBC was allowed to expire. The assets of the former commercial company were then sold to a new non-commercial British Broadcasting Corporation, which operated under a UK charter from the Crown.

With no possibility of commercial broadcasting available from inside the UK, Leonard Plugge – a former British Royal Air Force captain and entrepreneur (and from 1935 Conservative Party member of parliament) – set up his own International Broadcasting Company, which leased time on transmitters in continental Europe and resold it as sponsored English-language programming aimed at audiences in Britain and Ireland. Because Plugge successfully demonstrated that state monopolies such as that of the BBC could be broken, other parties became attracted to the idea of creating a new commercial radio station specifically for this purpose.

=== Formation of Radio Luxembourg ===
In 1924, radio technician François Anen built a 100-watt transmitter in his home in the Grand Duchy of Luxembourg. Within two years, the government of Luxembourg had reached an agreement to subsidize the station to broadcast military music concerts and plays performed in the Luxembourgish language. With its central location in western Europe, the Grand Duchy was an ideal site for broadcasts to many nations, including the United Kingdom.

Anen became inspired by the activities of Captain Plugge, who was using transmitters licensed in other countries to broadcast English-language radio programmes to Britain and Ireland, whose governments had not licensed commercial broadcasting. On 11 May 1929, he brought together a group of mainly French entrepreneurs to form the Luxembourg Society for Radio Studies (La Société Luxembourgeoise d'Études Radiophoniques) as a pressure group to force the Luxembourg government to issue them a commercial broadcasting licence.

On 19 December 1930, the government of Luxembourg passed a law awarding a monopoly licence to operate a commercial radio broadcasting franchise from the Grand Duchy. On 29 December, this licence was awarded to the Society, which in turn created the Luxembourg Broadcasting Company (Compagnie Luxembourgeoise de Radiodiffusion) to be identified on the air as Radio Luxembourg.

From 1932, German journalist Eva Siewert worked as editor-in-chief and trilingual head spokeswoman for the station in German, English and French. In May 1932, Radio Luxembourg began high-powered test transmissions aimed directly at Britain and Ireland (which proved, inadvertently, to be the first radio modification of the ionosphere). The reaction of the British government was hostile, as the long-wave band used for these tests carried a signal far superior to anything previously received from outside the country. The British government accused Radio Luxembourg of "pirating" the various wavelengths it was testing.

The station had planned to start regular broadcasts on 4 June 1933, but the complaints caused Radio Luxembourg to keep shifting its wavelength. The English service was leased to Radio Publicity (London) Ltd in the United Kingdom. In December 1933, Radio Publicity (London) transferred 23-year-old Stephen Williams from directing its English-language programmes transmitted over Radio Paris to become the first manager of the English-language service of Radio Luxembourg. Programmes in English debuted on 3 December 1933 under the editorial guidance of Stephen Williams.

On 1 January 1934, a new international agreement, the Lucerne Convention or European Wavelength Plan (which the Luxembourg government refused to sign) came into effect, and shortly afterwards Radio Luxembourg started a regular schedule of English-language transmissions from 8:15 am to midnight on Sundays, and at various times during the rest of the week. In February, Radio Luxembourg began broadcasting in both French and English on a new 200 kW transmitter on 230 kHz (1304 metres) in the long-wave band.

== First commercial era ==
=== 1933–1939 ===
In the years from 1933 to 1939, the English-language service of Radio Luxembourg gained a large audience in the UK and other European countries, with sponsored programming aired from noon until midnight on Sundays and at various times during the rest of the week. Around 11% of Britons listened to it during the week, preferring Luxembourg's light music and variety programmes to the BBC. Up to half of Britons did so before 10:15 am on weekdays when the BBC did not broadcast, and at weekends when it followed the Reith Sunday schedule of only serious and religious programmes.

The BBC and successive British governments continued to oppose the competition, citing Radio Luxembourg's use of an unauthorised frequency. As the station could not use General Post Office telephone lines to broadcast from London, many English-language programmes were recorded there and flown to Luxembourg. Despite the opposition, by 1938 many British companies advertised on Radio Luxembourg and fellow European broadcaster Radio Normandy. The stations thus exposed millions of Britons and British companies to commercial broadcasting, which contributed to the creation of the commercial ITV during the 1950s.

A group of holiday-making English Radio Luxembourg fans, pictured in front of the main entrance to the Transmitting Station. The date is Wednesday 9 August 1939, three weeks before the declaration of war.

==== Programmes ====
These were some of the shows heard in 1935 as listed in the 3 May edition of Radio Pictorial:

- Sundays: 12:00 noon – Musical Voyage – with Bobbie Comber and Reginald Purdell and sponsored by Halls Wine.
  - 12:15 pm – Do-Do Broadcasts – sponsored medication programme "for asthma suffers".
  - 12:30 pm – Golden Hour of Music – the Irish Concert recorded programme
  - 1:00 pm – Zam-Buk Broadcast – the latest dance music sponsored by a medication "for cuts, burns and bruises."
  - 1:30 pm – Littlewoods Broadcast – sponsored by a football pools coupon company in Liverpool.
  - 2:00 pm – English service ends until 2:30 pm.
  - 2:30 pm – Vernon's All-Star Variety Concert – gramophone records presented by a football pools company.
  - 5:30 pm – League of Ovaltineys – presented by the makers of Ovaltine. (The anthem of this children's show was still being celebrated by fan sites in 2007. Another version of the Ovaltineys programming began again after World War II on Radio Luxembourg over its 208 wavelength.)

==== Presenters ====
- Stephen Williams – the first station manager, who resumed his duties with the English service when the station resumed commercial English-language transmissions after World War II
- Gerald Carnes
- Charles Maxwell (1936)
- John Bewley
- S.P. Ogden-Smith (Chief Announcer in 1938)

== World War II ==
=== 1940–1945 ===
On 21 September 1939, the Luxembourg government closed the radio station to protect the neutrality of the country during World War II. The station and its transmitters were taken over by the invading German forces in 1940, and were used for English-language propaganda broadcasts by William Joyce (known as Lord Haw-Haw) and others. When Allied forces took over Luxembourg in September 1944, the station was transferred to US Army control on 9 September 1944 and used for black propaganda purposes for the remainder of the war (see Radio 1212).

== Second commercial era ==
=== 1946–1956 ===
When the Allied armed forces vacated the Radio Luxembourg premises at the close of World War II, the English-language service attempted to restart transmissions to the United Kingdom as a full-time commercial radio station using the European long-wave band, once more under the management of Stephen Williams.

During the war, Geoffrey Everitt served his last few months in Luxembourg, and this led to his employment by Stephen Williams on 21 June 1946. Williams soon left the station and Everitt found himself in charge of a small on-air staff of three women and one man. Because of the dearth of advertising available in English, the early morning shows on long wave quickly disappeared and made way for French-language programmes. More contractions followed and this led to cuts in more of the morning, afternoon and evening programming in English.

By the start of the 1950s, sponsorship of the English service had begun to grow once more, and while initially some of the English-language programmes continued via Radio Luxembourg I on long wave, a second but less powerful wavelength was opened up as Radio Luxembourg II on medium wave. The English programmes of Radio Luxembourg moved on 2 July 1951, from long wave to the medium wave frequency of 208 metres (1439 kHz). The controversy over the station's broadcasting frequencies had been resolved with the 1948 Copenhagen plan (which this time the Luxembourg government did sign), which allocated the country two high-power frequencies, one on long wave and the other on medium wave. Eventually all English programming moved to medium wave, with long wave being dedicated to French programmes, while German, Dutch and other languages used medium wave during the daytime.

In 1955, Hal Lewis who was better known at Hawaiian radio station KPOA as J. Akuhead Pupule (and later became the morning DJ at KGMB in Honolulu, Hawaii, during 1965), offered to buy the morning time from 6 am to 9 am for his own show on 208, but his offer was rejected. The 208 signal could be received satisfactorily in the United Kingdom only after dark, when it was able to strike the ionosphere and bounce back to the British Isles.

It was this second wavelength that eventually became dedicated to English-language programming after 6 pm under the slogan of "208 – Your station of the stars", referring to the entertainers heard on the station.

==== Programmes ====
March 1952 advertising for the Dan Dare Monday-to-Friday serial as it appeared in 208, the programme listing guide to Radio Luxembourg in English

These were some of the shows heard in March 1952 as reported in the 208 programme schedule:

- Sundays: 6:15 pm – Ovaltiney's Concert Party – a version of the popular show that was originally broadcast before World War II over the original Radio Luxembourg long-wave station.
  - 9:15 pm – Leslie Welch – "the famous Memory Man".
  - 10:45 pm – The Answer Man – "anything you want to know" (Sundays, Wednesdays, Fridays).
  - 11.00 PM – Top Twenty – introduced by Pete Murray.
- Mondays: 7:15 pm – The Adventures of Dan Dare, "Pilot of the future" – fifteen-minute serial heard Monday-to-Friday and featuring the voice of Noel Johnson who also played the part of Dick Barton on BBC radio. This serial began on 2 July 1951 and ran for five years.
  - 9:30 pm – Perry Mason, serial heard from Monday to Friday.
- Tuesdays: 10:55 pm – Soccer of Leicester – odds announcement.
- Wednesdays: 8:30 pm – The Story of Dr. Kildare – every Wednesday starring Lew Ayres, produced in Hollywood by MGM.
  - 11:00 pm – Back to the Bible – religious broadcast.
- Thursdays: 8:00 pm – Music From the Ballet.
  - 8:30 pm – Movie Magazine with Wilfrid Thomas.
  - 11:00 pm – Old Fashioned Revival Hour – religion (Charles E. Fuller)
- Fridays: 8:00 pm – Scottish Requests with Peter Madren.
  - 11:00 pm The Voice of Prophecy – Adventists' Union religious programme.
- Saturdays: 7:00 pm – Chance of a Lifetime – quiz programme with Dick Emery.
  - 10:00 pm – At Two-O-Eight – dance music with Russ Morgan Orchestra compered by Pete Murray.
  - 11:00 pm – Bringing Christ to the Nations – The Lutheran Hour.

Radio Luxembourg also served as a refuge for stars and shows previously heard on the BBC but with whom the BBC had fallen out for one reason or another. Thus, when in 1951 the BBC wanted Vera Lynn, one of its biggest singing stars, to perform more upbeat material than her traditional repertoire, she refused, and signed up to record 42 shows for Luxembourg instead – which, she said, also paid better. Likewise, the comedy series Much-Binding-in-the-Marsh, terminated by the BBC after six years, transferred to Radio Luxembourg for a period in 1950–51 before the BBC relented and revived the show.

On 7 April 1956, Billboard magazine reported that "WINS Radio made a deal with Harry Alan Towers of the Towers of London, for deejay Alan Freed to do a special taped 1/2 hour rock and roll record show on Saturday nights over Radio Luxembourg, which is beamed to most of the countries of Free Europe."

==== Presenters ====
Resident announcers in Luxembourg at different times:

- Stephen Williams – the English service manager before World War II, resumed his duties when commercial broadcasting began again.
- Ursula Brennan – Patricia Giles – Beatrice Feltes – John De Denghy – record presenters who all left the station with Stephen Williams around 1948.
- Geoffrey Everitt – joined Radio Luxembourg on 21 June 1946 after being demobbed from British Army in Luxembourg. He was hired by Stephen Williams and when Williams returned to the UK, Everitt took over his job. In later years he became the London-based boss of the entire English-language operation.
- Teddy Johnson – joined in May 1948 and he and Everitt ran the English service in Luxembourg by themselves until 1950 due to the lack of advertising income. Then Johnson returned to England to develop his singing career and later returned to join Pete Murray.
- John Michael Drexler – joined after Johnson departed but Drexler left after one month.
- Roger Moffat; Richard Beynon; Warren Mitchell – all joined with Drexler and left shortly after Drexler.
- Pete Murray – joined with Drexler, Beynon and Mitchell; remained in Luxembourg until 1956.
- Peter Madren – joined Everitt, Johnson and Murray in May 1951.

=== 1954–1963 ===
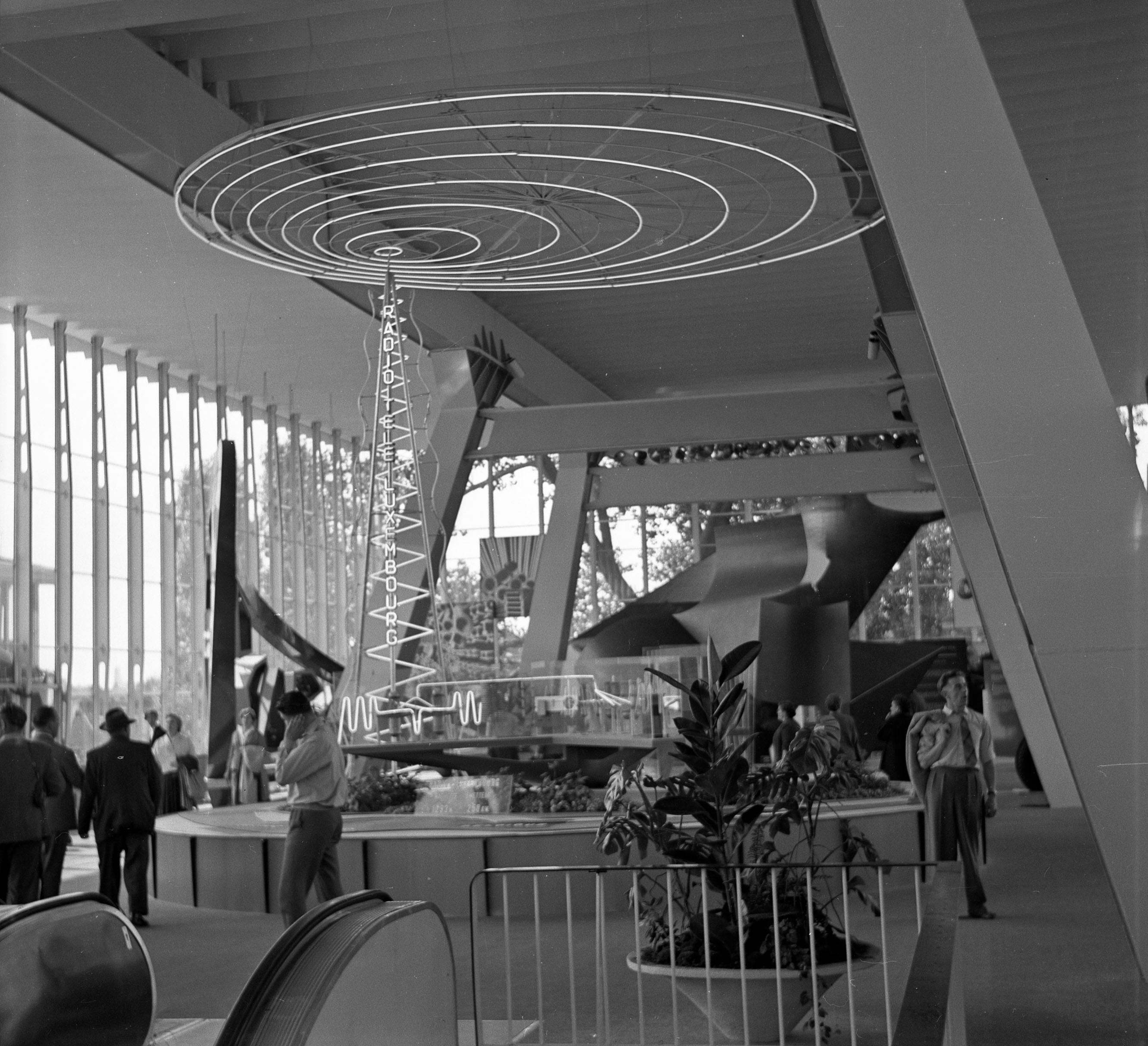
Radio Luxembourg at Expo 58 in Brussels, Belgium. July 1958

Following the merger of the English-language service of Radio Luxembourg I with the new English-language service of Radio Luxembourg II on 208 metres medium wave, the station came to be known as Radio Luxembourg. A British company, Radio Luxembourg (London) Ltd, controlled the programme content and sold the advertising time.

The station sign-on time at dusk varied between summer and winter to allow maximum benefit to be gained from a skywave propagation at night that covered the British Isles, although reception was strongest in northern England. By restricting the service to night-time, the sales representatives were able to sell most of the available airtime both for spot commercials and for sponsored programmes. One spot commercial that became burned into the minds of every Radio Luxembourg listener was for Horace Batchelor's "Infra-Draw Method" of winning money on football pools, turning the previously obscure Somerset town of "Keynsham, spelt K-E-Y-N-S-H-A-M" into a household name throughout the country.

Some programmes were live disc-jockey presentations by the team of "resident announcers" from the studios in Luxembourg City, while others were pre-recorded in the company's British studios at 38 Hertford Street, London W1. This was never made clear to listeners, who were allowed to form the incorrect impression that all the presenters were broadcasting from the Grand Duchy or, alternatively, assume that all the programmes were recorded in London.

A conspiracy of silence operated throughout this period between sworn enemies Radio Luxembourg and the BBC, each of which never mentioned the existence of the other, although many famous names appeared on both, often almost simultaneously.

==== Programmes ====
During this period, and particularly from about 1960, the station's output came to be more explicitly targeted at the growing teenage market, with increasing emphasis on pop music. Drama productions, comedy, variety and sports programming disappeared altogether. By about 1963, almost all the station's output was based around the playing of music on discs; the mainstream evening audience for middle-aged "family entertainment" had by this time largely migrated from radio to television.

These were some of the shows heard in December 1956, as listed in the 208 programme schedule for that month:

- Sundays: 6:00 pm – Butlin's Beaver Club – with "Uncle" Eric Winstone.
  - 8:30 pm – Take Your Pick! – with Michael Miles.
  - 9:30 pm – This I Believe – the Edward R. Murrow show presented by Sir Basil Bartlett.
- Mondays: 9:30 pm – Candid Microphone – starring listeners caught in the act.
  - 11:15 pm – Frank and Ernest – religion from Dawn Bible Students Association.
  - 11:30 pm – The World Tomorrow – with Herbert W. Armstrong, later heard on Tuesdays as well, replacing Oral Roberts.
- Tuesdays: 9:00 pm – Lucky Number – with Keith Fordyce.
  - 10:00 pm – The Capitol Show – Mel Thompson presenting Capitol Records' new releases.
- Wednesdays: 8:00 pm – Double Your Money – Hughie Green.
  - 10:00 pm – Rockin' To Dreamland – with Keith Fordyce, playing the latest British and American hit records.
  - 11:30 pm – The Hour of Decision – religion with Billy Graham.
- Thursdays: 8:30 pm – Lucky Couple – with David Jacobs, recorded on location in the UK.
  - 9:30 pm – Irish Requests.
  - 10:45 pm – Italy Sings – presented by the Italian State Tourist Office.
- Fridays: 10:30 pm – Record Hop – Benny Lee presents the latest recordings from EMI's Columbia and Parlophone labels.
- Saturdays: 7:00 pm – Amateur Football – results of the matches played today.
  - 8:00 pm – Jamboree – "120 minutes of exciting, non-stop, action-packed radio ... Teenage Jury and at approximately 9:30: Alan Freed, the remarkable American disc-jockey whose programmes in the States cause excitement to rise to a fever pitch, presents "Rock 'n' roll"."
  - 10.00 PM – Tonight – "Peter Haigh presents news, music and personalities recorded at the Embassy Club in London."
  - 10:30 pm – Philips' Fanfare – records from this label presented by Guy Standeven.

==== Presenters ====
Resident announcers in Luxembourg during this period included:

- Barry Alldis – joined the team in 1956, becoming Chief Announcer and staying until 1966, when he left to work for BBC radio. He returned to Luxembourg in 1975 and remained on the staff until his death in 1982.
- Chris Denning
- Colin Hamilton
- Ted King
- Johnny Moran
- Don Moss, 1957–60
- Don Wardell (became Chief Announcer after Alldis left in 1966)

The following disc-jockeys recorded shows in the London studios at 38 Hertford Street: Peter Aldersley, Sam Costa, Alan Dell, Keith Fordyce, Alan Freeman, David Gell, Tony Hall, Jack Jackson, David Jacobs, Brian Matthew, Don Moss, Pete Murray, Ray Orchard, Jimmy Savile, Shaw Taylor, Jimmy Young, and Muriel Young. Many of these programmes were sponsored by record companies, and in order to include as many records as possible, most programmes played little more than half of each record.

=== 1964–1967 ===
Radio Luxembourg enjoyed a monopoly of English-language commercial radio programming heard in the UK until, in March 1964, Radio Caroline began daytime commercial transmissions to southern England from a ship anchored less than four miles off the Essex coast (the station later acquired a second ship, and moved the first to the Irish Sea). Radio Caroline's opening announcement identified it as "Your all-day music station" – a clear reference both to Luxembourg's night-time-only broadcasts, and to the BBC's patchy pop music coverage. The first song played was "Not Fade Away" by the Rolling Stones, which could be interpreted as a dig at Luxembourg's fluctuating signal strength.

In Caroline's primary reception areas, her ground wave signal was strong and unaffected during daylight hours by fading or interference. Following the success of this first offshore station, others soon followed, mostly broadcasting from off the Essex coast or in the Thames Estuary. These transmissions were later extended around the clock and featured many different broadcasting formats, though pop music on discs predominated.

As a result of this competition, Radio Luxembourg gradually abandoned pre-recorded sponsored programmes for a more flexible continuity. Its new format featured mainly spot advertising within record programmes presented live by resident disc jockeys in Luxembourg, some of them recruited from the offshore stations.

In August 1967, the Marine Broadcasting Offences Act passed into British law, and forced all but the two Caroline stations off the air by eliminating their means of selling commercial advertising in the UK. As well as closing down offshore "pirate radio", the British government instructed the BBC to create its own non-commercial replacement, named Radio 1, which began transmissions at the end of September 1967. While Luxembourg again almost had the UK commercial airwaves to itself, it was still restricted to evening and night hours.

==== Presenters ====
The presenters included the following:

- Pete Brady, Radio London
- Tony Brandon, Radio London
- Paul Burnett, Radio 270
- Dave Cash, Radio London
- Simon Dee, Radio Caroline, BBC TV
- Noel Edmonds, BBC
- Kenny Everett, Radio London, BBC
- Stuart Grundy
- Tommy Vance, Radio London, Radio Caroline South
- Keith Skues, British Forces Network, Radio Caroline 199, Radio London
- Johnnie Walker, Swinging Radio England, Radio Caroline South

All the ex-Radio London DJs worked later for BBC Radio One.

=== 1968–1988 ===
By the middle of 1968, even the two Caroline offshore stations had left the air and, while other attempts were made to restart offshore radio commercial broadcasts aimed at the UK in the early 1970s, Luxembourg did not face commercial competition, only a growing increase in audience share by more BBC services. For a time in the late 1960s Luxembourg advertised itself as "The O.I.S. – the Only Independent Station on the Air". In 1973, the BBC radio monopoly within the UK was finally ended by new legislation allowing Independent Local Radio, funded by the sale of advertising time.

In 1983, Radio Luxembourg marked its fiftieth anniversary as a station, but the British commercial radio stations kept whittling away the 208 audience and advertising, while a brief replay of competition for audiences began to emerge from off the British coastline with new radio ship transmissions.

==== Programmes ====
These were shows heard in 1982 as reported in the Radio Luxembourg Research Report (page 20) of 208 listeners. The Survey was conducted during the last quarter of 1982 by British Market Research Bureau for Radio Luxembourg (London) Ltd. By the time the survey appeared, the programme line-up below had changed in various ways, including the death of Barry Alldis in the middle of the survey:

- Sundays: 7:00 pm – Haunted Studio – with Stuart and Ollie Henry. 9:00 pm – Star Chart and Top 30 UK Singles – with Tony Prince. 11:00 pm – Sunday's Top 20s – with Barry Alldis and Rob Jones. 1:00 am – Earthlink – with Benny Brown.
- Mondays: 6:45 pm – Radio Outreach with John Knight; Battle of the Giants; Top 30 Airplay; Top 30 Disco – with Rob Jones and Benny Brown. 1:00 am – Earthlink – with Barry Alldis.
- Tuesdays: 6:45 pm – 208 Editorial with Rodney Collins; Beatle Hour; Daily Mirror Rock and Pop Club; Top 30 UK; Top 30 Albums – with Rob Jones and Barry Alldis. 9:00 pm – Top 30 UK; Top 30 Albums – with Benny Brown. 1:00 am – Earthlink – with Mike Hollis.
- Wednesdays: 7:00 pm – Gold and Games – with Rob Jones and Benny Brown. 9:00 pm – American Top 30 – with Bob Stewart. 11:00 pm – Top 30 Easy Listening – with Benny Brown. 1:00 am – Earthlink – with Mike Hollis.
- Thursdays: 7:00 pm – The Number Ones; Top of the Pops – with Bob Stewart and Mike Hollis. 9:00 pm – Top 30 Futurist – with Rob Jones. 11:00 pm – Discothèque – with Benny Brown. Midnight – Spotlight On ... – with Stuart Henry. 1:00 am – Earthlink – with Stuart and Ollie Henry.
- Fridays: 7:00 pm – The Record Journal – with Stuart and Ollie Henry. 9:00 pm – Top 30 Disco – with Tony Prince. 11:00 pm – Top 30 Airplay (repeat) – with Bob Stewart. 1:00 am – Earthlink – with Barry Alldis.
- Saturdays: 6:45 pm – 208 Editorial – with Rodney Collins. 7:00 pm – Street Heat; Top 30 Rockshow – with Stuart and Ollie Henry. 11:00 pm – Big L Marlboro Top 20 Country – with Bob Stewart. Midnight – Midnight Memories – with Barry Alldis. 1:00 am – Earthlink; Love Songs – with Mike Hollis.

Some other presenters in the 1970s and 1980s:

- Dave Christian
- Neil Fox
- Peter Powell
- Tony Prince, Radio Caroline North
- Tony Blewitt
- David Lee Stone (former Laser 558 DJ)
- Bob Stewart, Radio Caroline North
- Rob Jones
- Howard Pearce
- Tim Smith
- Steve Wright
- Pearly Gates
- Mike Hollis
- Mike Read
- Emperor Rosko, Radio Caroline South
- Mark Wesley, Radio 390, RNI
- Paul Burnett, Radio 270
- David "Kid" Jensen, BBC Radio One
- Stuart Henry; Radio Scotland 242
- Ollie Henry (wife of Stuart Henry)
- Rodney Collins
- Keith Fordyce
- Alton Andrews
- Timmy Mallett
- Nick Abbot

During the 1980s one of the station's slogans was "Planet earth's biggest commercial radio station".

=== 1989–1992 ===
In 1989, hoping to build a new audience, Luxembourg in English once more returned with a daytime schedule for the first time since the early 1950s, but this time it was aimed at Scandinavian audiences using a 24-hour stereo transponder on the Astra 1A satellite to supplement the 208 analogue night-time service. The end eventually came for 208 at 3 am GMT on 30 December 1991 (the station did return to the analogue 208/1440 for one night a year later when the station finally closed its digital service), the last record played on AM being Van Morrison's "In the Days Before Rock and Roll" (chosen mainly because of its mention of the radio station), before "At the End of the Day" (one of their closedown songs) was played heading into the top of the hour (even though DJ Jeff Graham had said that they were going to play the original closedown tune, it was not in fact the original song, but a later version the station used as the original was not located, "It's Time To Say Goodnight"). The station then went satellite and shortwave (15350 kHz) only, with the first songs played being "When Will You (Make My Telephone Ring)" by Deacon Blue and "Always" by Atlantic Starr.

The satellite and shortwave service continued until midnight on 30 December 1992. The closedown night was relayed on various stations, including the old 208 wavelength. The Van Morrison song was the next-to-last record that night, followed by Marion Montgomery's "Maybe the Morning".

The 208 service from that moment on carried the German-language service, identifying itself as "RTL Radio – Der Oldiesender". This medium wave broadcast shut down at midnight on 31 December 2015.

Presenters in the 1990s:

- Chris Moyles (under the professional name Chris Holmes)
- Jonathan Miles
- Mike Hollis
- Bob Stewart, (ex-Radio Caroline North)
- Mark Page
- Peter Antony
- Wendy Lloyd
- Tony Adams
- Shaun Tilley, (ex-Radio Caroline South)
- Jeff Graham
- Steve Joy
- Sandy Beech
- David Bozzato
- Jodie Scott (ex Caroline 558 DJ. Canadian, on Caroline as Judy Murphy)
- Nik Martin
- Jessie Brandon, (ex Laser 558)

== Legacy from 1992 onwards ==
=== Atlantic 252 ===
In 1989, Radio Luxembourg's parent company RTL Group teamed up with Raidió Teilifís Éireann to create Atlantic 252, an English-language pop music station on longwave, based in Ireland and with advertising content aimed at a UK audience. Initially this only broadcast until 7 pm and ended with an announcement specifically encouraging listeners to switch to Radio Luxembourg on 1440 kHz medium wave. Atlantic 252 switched to 24-hour broadcasts around the time that Radio Luxembourg shut down its medium wave broadcasts. Atlantic 252 closed down in 2002 and the long wave frequency was then used for RTÉ Radio 1 until April 2023 with the mast being demolished in July 2023. Presenters common to both Atlantic 252 and Radio Luxembourg include Jeff Graham, Cass Jones and Sandy Beech. The voice of Henry Owens was also heard on promotions for both stations in the early 1990s.

- Charlie Wolf, ex DJ Laser 558
- Andrew Turner, ex newsreader BBC & Laser Hot Hits 576

=== Radio Luxembourg (digital) ===
An English-language classic rock digital station from RTL Group called Radio Luxembourg began in 2005. It was briefly available in the UK using DRM (digital broadcasts over shortwave) but the transmitter power was reduced, and by 2008 was not receivable outside Luxembourg itself (essentially, a test transmission). Simulcasts over the Internet also stopped in 2009. Both the station and its website made numerous references to the old 208 service.

=== Five (television channel) ===
RTL Group, Radio Luxembourg's parent company, was an initial minority shareholder in the UK's Channel Five terrestrial analogue television channel, launched in 1997. RTL became the majority shareholder from 2006, when it had been re-branded as "Five". It was one of more than fifty television stations that RTL owned throughout Europe. Unlike RTL's television stations in Belgium, Germany and the Netherlands, most of which are explicitly branded as RTL, Five did not significantly acknowledge its Luxembourg heritage on-air. RTL sold Five to Richard Desmond on 23 July 2010.

== Background information ==
Radio Luxembourg was also broadcast on RTL's various European TV channels after closedown.

=== Transmitter history ===
The wavelengths and frequencies used by the English service of Radio Luxembourg changed throughout the years, although "208" was by far the longest-lasting and most famous one.

- Marnach transmitter
- Junglinster Longwave Transmitter
- FM- and TV-mast Hosingen

=== Radio Luxembourg publications ===
- Radio Pictorial – radio publication pre-World War II that published programme schedules for all the European continental stations broadcasting in English
- Radio Parade – radio publication after World War II that published news about Radio Luxembourg in English.
- 208 – radio programme schedules and features from 1951 until 1959, whose name varied as it was merged with other publications and issued by various publishers
- Fabulous 208 (later Fab 208) – radio programme schedules and features publication during the 1960s and 1970s

=== Political significance in the Eastern Bloc ===
Radio Luxembourg was one of few channels through which people living in the Eastern Bloc could listen to rock and other contemporary popular music. Under good weather conditions, and especially at night, people as far as eastern Czechoslovakia, Poland, Estonia, Lithuania, Belarus, Leningrad and Moscow could listen to the station. Eastern Bloc governments did not use jammers to prevent people from listening to Radio Luxembourg, but did do so for Radio Free Europe and, since the stations used harmonic frequencies (1439 kHz for Luxembourg and 719 kHz for Free Europe), the jamming also affected Radio Luxembourg's signal. Even though western popular music was considered undesirable by socialist regimes, legal prosecution was rare, although not unheard of. The music appealed to young people as something forbidden, and listening to it became a social ritual. It also strongly influenced contemporary underground culture and music in Czechoslovakia.

== See also ==
- Radio Luxembourg (DRM) – broadcasting for a few years commencing 2005
- Radio Luxembourg (disambiguation) – other language services
- RTL (French radio) – French-language station
- RTL Radio – German-language station
- Timeline of Radio Luxembourg
