= Luxemburg–Gorky effect =

In radiophysics, the Luxemburg–Gorky effect (named after Radio Luxemburg and the city of Gorky (Nizhny Novgorod)) is a phenomenon of cross modulation between two radio waves, one of which is strong, passing through the same part of a medium, especially a conductive region of atmosphere or a plasma.

Current theory seems to be that the conductivity of the ionosphere is affected by the presence of strong radio waves. The strength of a radio wave returning from the ionosphere to a distant point is dependent on this conductivity level. Therefore, if station "A" is radiating a strong amplitude modulated radio signal all around, some of it will modulate the conductivity of the ionosphere above the station. Then if station "B" is also sending an amplitude modulated signal from another location, the part of station "B's" signal that passes through the ionosphere disturbed by station "A" to a receiver in line with both stations may have its strength modulated by the station "A" signal, even though the two are widely apart in frequency. In other words, the ionosphere passes the station "B" signal with a strength that varies in step with the modulation (voice, etc.) of station "A." This re-modulation level of the station "B" signal is usually only a few percent, but is enough to make both stations audible. The interference (both stations simultaneously received) goes away as the receiver is tuned slightly away from the frequency of "B."

== See also ==
- Junglinster Longwave Transmitter
- Distortion
- Radio propagation
- Plasma physics
