= Stephen Williams (Radio Luxembourg) =

British radio broadcaster (1908–1994)

Stephen Williams (31 March 1908 - 23 November 1994) was a British radio announcer, presenter and producer, and a pioneer of commercial radio for the UK.

Born in London and educated at Trinity College, Cambridge, as a young boy he was already, in his words, a "wireless fanatic": he said, "I was able to listen proudly to the debut of the BBC on 14 November 1922, and from the moment I heard the announcer say "This is 2LO calling, 2LO, the London station of the British Broadcasting Company", I was seized with an ambition to have a job like his."

During his university vacation in 1928 he got a job as announcer on a "broadcasting yacht" sponsored by the Daily Mail newspaper group. This vessel went round the coast of Britain, transmitting music on records and advertisements for the Daily Mail, from just outside territorial waters, an early precursor of the 1960s "pirate radio" ships..

The broadcasting yacht had been the idea of the paper's Circulation and Publicity Director, Valentine Smith, who soon transferred to the Sunday Referee, where he gave Williams a job with the idea of involving the paper in commercial broadcasting. They were soon in contact with Captain Leonard F. Plugge, who was starting the International Broadcasting Company (IBC).

At the beginning of 1932, Williams was sent to France to join Max Staniforth at the IBC's new Radio Normandy service, broadcasting to the south of England.

Recordings of two commercials read by Stephen Williams on Radio Normandy in 1932 are said to survive.

Stephen Williams moved on to a rival company to IBC, Radio Publicity, which started broadcasting to the UK from Radio Paris, then a much more powerful station than Radio Normandy, which rapidly gained a large British audience. But French listeners complained that their most popular station was now too dominated by English programmes, so Radio Publicity turned to the newly created Radio Luxembourg, where it was able to gain the sole concession for English programmes.

In December 1933, Williams thus became the first English radio presenter in Luxembourg as well as serving as manager of the station.

Shortly before his death in 1994, Williams gave an interview to Roger Bickerton about his work at Radio Luxembourg which was published in The Historic Record and AV Collector, Issues 39,40 and 41, April, June & October 1996.

Radio Luxembourg closed down on the outbreak of World War II in September 1939. Stephen Williams resumed his duties there when the station restarted in 1946. He left Luxembourg in 1948, and worked until 1975 as a freelance broadcaster.

When, on 1 January 1992, Radio Luxembourg's English service closed down as a terrestrial radio station, the last words heard, "Good luck, good listening ... and goodbye" were spoken by 83-year-old Stephen Williams, who had been the first person to say on the air "This is Radio Luxembourg" over 58 years earlier.

Williams was awarded the Order of Merit of the Grand Duchy of Luxembourg by the Grand Duke of Luxembourg in 1992.

He collected a large archive of material related to Radio Luxembourg, much of which his widow has donated to the Centre for Luxembourg Studies at Sheffield University.
