= Giustina Rocca =

Italian Renaissance lawyer, judge and diplomat

Giustina Rocca (died 1502) was an Italian Renaissance lawyer, judge and diplomat. She has been called the world's first female lawyer and is claimed as an inspiration for the character of Portia in Shakespeare's play Merchant of Venice.

== Life ==
Giustina Rocca was born in Trani in the second half of the fifteenth century, the daughter of Orazio Rocca, orator at the Senate of Naples. She married the Royal Captain Giovanni Antonio Palagano, with whom she had four children. Her daughter Cornelia died before the age of twenty in 1492.

Rocca was a lawyer at the Court of Trani, and is traditionally regarded as having specialized in delicate diplomatic issues between Trani and Venice. On 8 April 1500, she pronounced an arbitration sentence before the Venetian governor of Trani, Ludovico Contarini. In her last wishes, dictated to a notary on 10 June 1501, she asked to be buried in Trani Cathedral next to the tomb of her daughter Cornelia.

== Memorialization ==
Rocca's life was celebrated in Tractatus de iure patronatus (1533), by the Trani jurist Cesare Lambertini.

The Rocca tower in Luxembourg was completed in 2019 as an addition to the headquarters of the Court of Justice of the European Union. It is the tallest building in the country.
