= Radio Luxembourg (disambiguation) =

Radio Luxembourg was a commercial radio station in English, begun in 1933 and closed in 1992.

Radio Luxembourg may refer to:

- Radio Luxembourg, (RTL), a French-language commercial radio station begun in 1933
- Radio Luxemburg (RTL Radio), a German-language station begun after World War II
- Radio Luxemburg, a commercial radio station in Dutch, begun in 1933
- Radio 1212, an Allied black propaganda radio station operated from 1944 to 1945
- Radio Luxembourg (DRM), a commercial station operated between 2005 and 2008

== See also ==
- RTL (disambiguation)
