= Palais de la Cour de Justice =

Building complex acting as the seat of the Court of Justice of the European Union

- Interactive map of the Palais de la Cour de Justice area

General information
- Location: Kirchberg, Luxembourg City, Luxembourg
- Coordinates: 49.621179°N 6.141071°E
- Current tenants: Seat of the Court of Justice of the European Union and its two component courts
- Inaugurated: 9 January 1973; 53 years ago
- Renovated: 1986–1989, 1989–1992, 1992–1993, 2004–2008, 2013–2019

Website
- curia.europa.eu

The Palais de la Cour de Justice is a building complex acting as the seat of the Court of Justice of the European Union (CJEU), located in the Luxembourg City district of Kirchberg. Today the Palais complex encompasses the original 1973 building, now known as the Ancien Palais, which houses the court rooms of the CJEU's Court of Justice, the Anneau building, encircling the Ancien Palais, which contains the judges chambers and deliberative rooms, the three tower buildings containing the CJEU's translation services, and the Gallery building, containing the CJEU's legal library and linking all the structures of the Palais complex with the renovated three annexes (Erasmus, Thomas More and Themis) originally constructed between 1978 and 1994 that now host the court rooms of the CJEU's General Court.

The Palais' third tower, and latest extension to the complex, is the tallest building in Luxembourg, and, according to the CJEU, boasts the only skyscraper observation deck in the world with a view over four countries: Belgium, France, Germany and Luxembourg.

== History: 1973–1994 ==
=== Ancien Palais building ===
Today's present day CJEU has been based in Luxembourg City since its original formation in 1952 under the EU's forerunner, the European Coal and Steel Community (ECSC) — as were, on a provisional basis, all institutions of the newly formed supranational organisation. Due to the lack of suitable premises to house the new institution, it was split across three buildings: the Villa Vauban, for the chambers of the seven Judges and two Advocates General; the Hamilius Building, for the language services, and the Maison Hellinkx, for the administration and the library. This arrangement was maintained until August 1959, when a building large enough to host all departments, located on the Côte d'Eich, was made available by the State. However, following the Luxembourg government's decision to re-develop the Luxembourg City district of Kirchberg as a district dedicated to the European Communities (EC) — of which, despite their separate nature, the Court had become their sole judicial arbiter — it was decided to relocate the institution to the plateau.

The original Palais building, now known as the Ancien Palais building, was the first building of the EC to be designed through an architectural competition. Luxembourg architects, who could invite foreign partners proposed seventeen different projects. A jury composed of architects from neighbouring Belgium, France and Germany, rejected the most extreme designs. The Luxembourg government desired a design that would be symbolic of venture for European unity. The winning design, submitted by Jean Paul Consemius of Luxembourg, with François Jamagne and Michel Vande Elst of Belgium, was inspired by classical Greek architecture. The building, which opened in 1973, featured an isolated horizontal building reminiscent of an Ancient Greek temple at the top of a slope. In a tribute to Luxembourg's steel industry, the building was to be clad in Corox steel, which would require little maintenance.

=== Annexes: the first to third extensions ===
The Themis building with its fortress-like form.

Between 1978 and 1994, three annexes were added to the complex, designed by Luxembourg-based architects Bohadan Paczowski, Jean Herr, Gilbert Huyberecht, Bohdan Paczowski, and Paul Fritsch, with Isabelle van Driessche joining for the third; the Erasmus, Thomas More, and Themis buildings. In order to preserve the original intent of the court as a Greek temple, these were placed down-slope from the Ancien Palais building. The first of these, the Erasmus building, was constructed between 1986 and 1989 around an axial symmetry design. This was closely followed by two buildings based around orthogonal designs, the Thomas More Building, constructed between 1989 and 1992, and lastly, the Themis building with its four turrets, constructed between 1992 and 1993. Architectural historian Carolina Hein notes that the designs were also influenced by the style of the edifices of the various financial institutions that had begun to cement their presence in Luxembourg City, as can be seen with the pink granite cladding present on all three of the annexes.

The Erasmus and Thomas More building's namesakes, are Renaissance-era philosophers and scholars: respectively, Desiderius Erasmus of Rotterdam, and Sir Thomas More. The Themis building is named after the Ancient Greek goddess of justice. (Note: The Themis building received its name in 2022, being known prior as "Annex C".)

== The Palais today ==
=== Fourth extension and renovations ===
Even prior to completion of the third annex, in October 1988 the Council of the then European Communities authorised the need for a fourth extension, recognising the need for office space to cope with an increasing workflow and the future demands of additional staff caused by future possible enlargements. In 1996, this task was awarded to Paris-based architect Dominique Perrault following an architectural competition. The existence of asbestos in the Ancien Palais building, as well as outdated office arrangements in a building designed prior to the incorporation of modern IT services would require the gutting of the internals of the existing structures. Asbestos removal work began in 2000, with a ground-breaking ceremony held in 2002, and construction works on the fourth extension only beginning in earnest in 2004, and lasting until 2008, with the inauguration ceremony occurring on 4 December of that year. Subsequent renovation works on the three annex buildings also occurred.

The most striking adaptations brought by Perrault's design to the present day Palais include his decision to build vertically due to space constraints, and the striking use of the colour gold on the façades and interior finishing's of the building. Of the latter, Perrault has claimed that this is a reflection of the CJEU's role as a "constitutional" — rather than a criminal — court. Perrault has also spoken of his desire to demonstrate, via his designs, a blend of two distinctive styles: the iconic and ritualistic, with the transparent and modern.

==== Anneau ====
The Anneau building as seen from the complex's forecourt.

Due to the space constraints posed by the development of other buildings on the Kirchberg plateau since the original construction of the Court, and in order to preserve the original intent of the Ancien Palais building as Greek temple, Perrault's design sees the Ancien Palais building encircled at a distance of 15 m by a two-storey building resting on 116 10 m tall stilts, and referred to as the "Anneau" or, in English, "the Ring". Whilst the Ancien Palais is dedicated to the public side of justice, featuring several court rooms including the Grand Chamber, the Anneau is reserved for the hearing rooms and chambers of the judges.

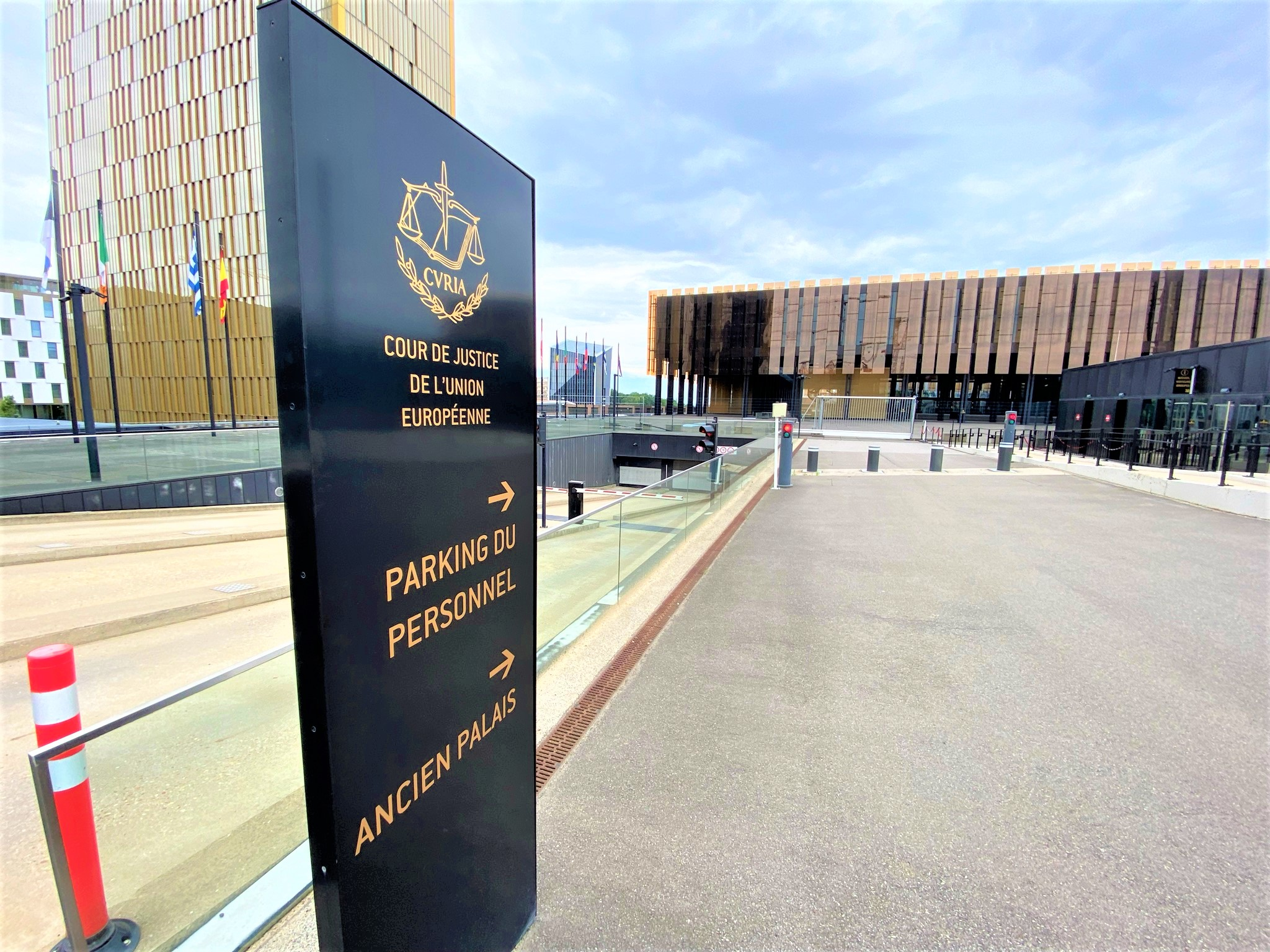
The Anneau building encircles the Ancien Palais.

==== A renovated Ancien Palais and courtrooms ====
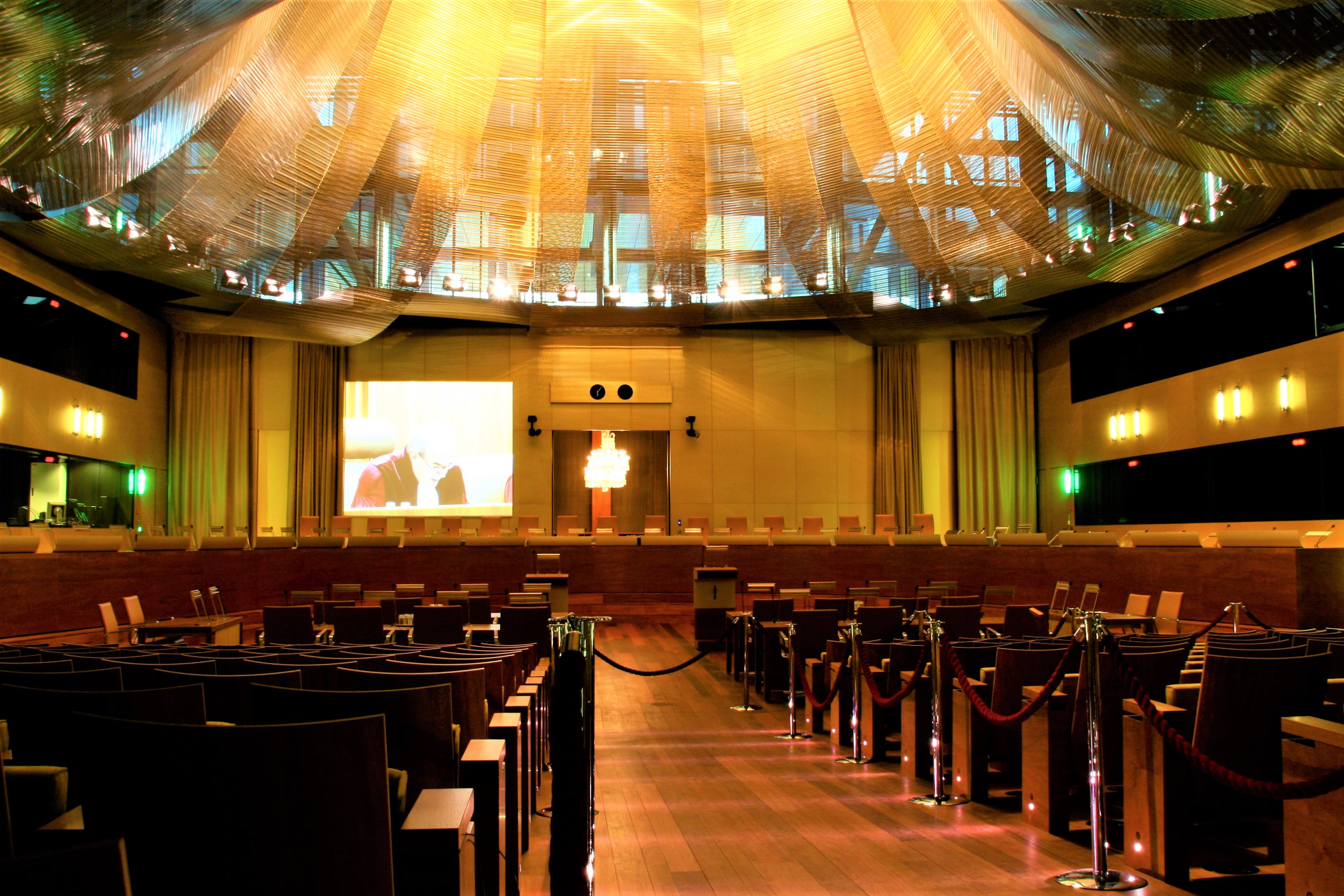
Main courtroom of the Ancien Palais. Interpreters booths, such as those seen here facing onto either side of the chamber, can be found in all courtrooms of the CJEU, with the possibility of proceedings being simultaneously translated into any of the 24 official languages of the EU.

Reflecting the increasing division of labour between the CJEU's two component courts, the Ancien Palais building was, during renovations, dedicated to proceedings of the Court of Justice, whilst the General Court — then still known as the Court of First Instance — was moved to the Thomas More building, later renovated in 2013. To symbolise the Court of Justice's status as the overall arbiter of EU law, Perrault placed the main court room centrally within the renovated Ancien Palais. When entering the building from the CJEU's forecourt, public visitors are met with the site of a shimmering golden veil draped over the main court room, and acting as its ceiling — a contemporary interpretation of the classic dome. Composed from 40 trapezoidal, bronze anodized woven fabric panels, Perrault remarked that the idea was his solution to bringing warmth and daylight into the proceedings of the Court, without providing outside views that may distract the judges. To complement this, the main court room features wood-lined walls and purple carpets, as is also seen in the four other smaller court rooms of the Ancien Palais building.

Connecting all five court rooms of the Ancien Palais building are large, open interconnecting waiting halls, known as "salles des Pas Perdus" (fr) — literally translating into English as "the halls of lost steps".

==== Comenius and Montesquieu towers ====
The planned 2004 expansion of the EU from 15 to 25 states, as well as envisioned future enlargements posed particular challenges in finding office space to hold the CJEU's translation services, critical to the functioning of the institution. To meet this challenge and deal with space constraints, Perrault proposed the addition of two 24-storey, 107 m tall towers as part of the fourth extension to the Palais complex. The two towers feature a golden façade composed of 7,724 gold-anodized aluminium mesh panels bent into a zigzag shape to offer maximum opaqueness from the outside. The two towers were originally designed to afford each of the 24 language units of the CJEU's translation services its own space over two floors linked by a spiral staircase.

The towers are named, respectively, after the 17th century Moravian philosopher, John Amos Comenius, and the 18th century French philosopher, Montesquieu.

==== Gallery and library ====
To provide a secure, internal structural link between the Anneau, Ancien Palais, the three Annex buildings, and Towers Perrault designed the Gallery, whose principal component is a glass-roofed indoor street, 300 m long, 8 m wide, and 9.85 m high. As well as providing staff with access to a number of facilities, including a bank, 14 training rooms, a newspaper kiosk and self-service restaurant, the Gallery also houses the CJEU's library. The library opens up onto the Gallery's street over a 70 m distance, and occupies the full height of the structure, containing a three-storey reading room with 80 ergonomic reading stations. The library's collection counts more than 150,000 volumes, with 70,000 covering EU periodicals, EU, comparative and international law and the law of EU Member States being available in the library itself. A further 80,000 volumes covering the laws of certain non-EU Member States, official journals and court reports of EU Member States, and dictionaries are stored in the basement of Tower B, directly accessible via a covered walkway from the library's reading room.

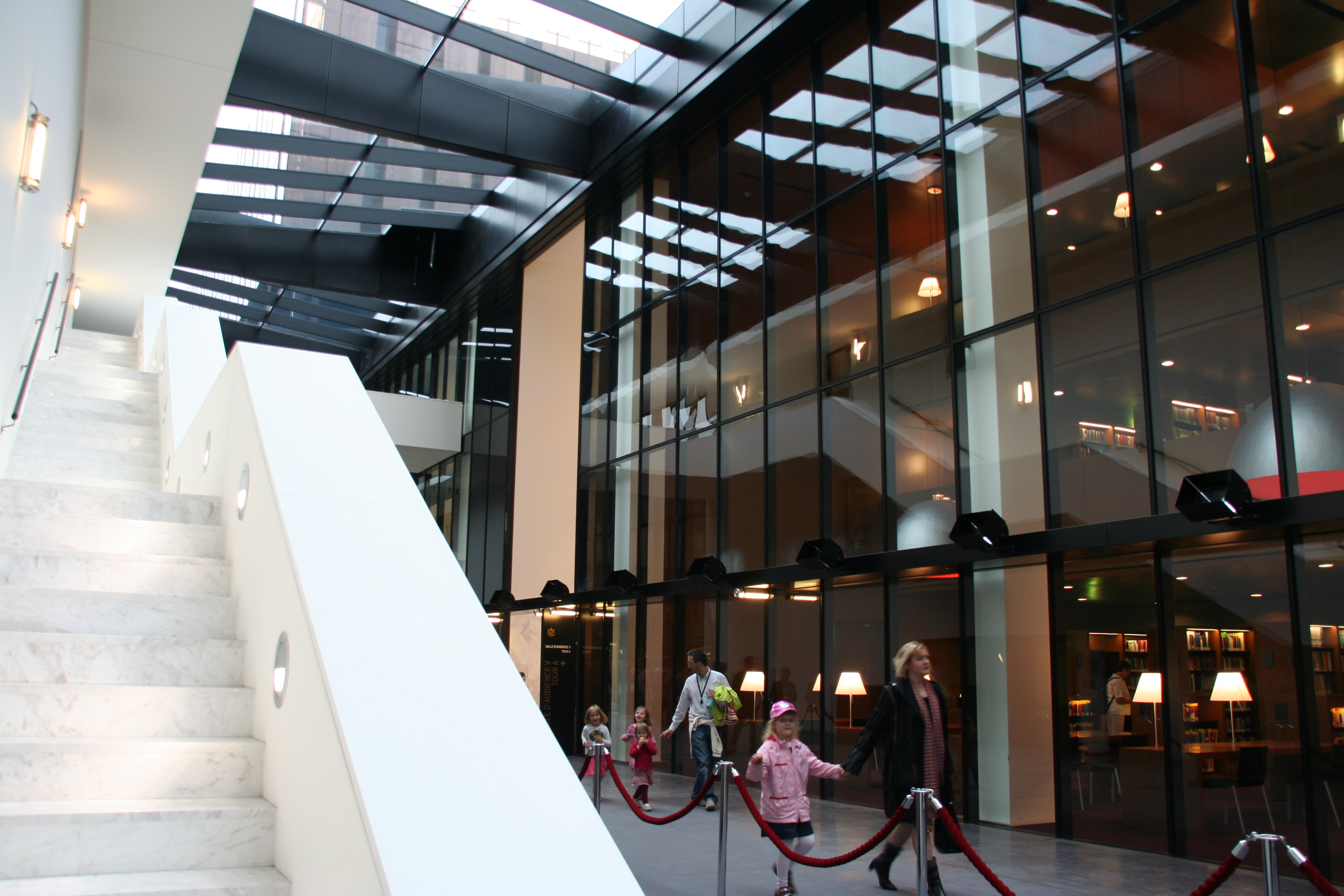
The Gallery and library seen here during a public opening to celebrate Europe Day.

=== Fifth extension ===
==== Rocca tower ====
Also designed by Perrault, the fifth and most recent extension to the Palais complex was inaugurated on 19 September 2019, consisting of a third high-rise, known as the Rocca tower, providing for additional office space for the CJEU's translation services and administration. Standing parallel to — but at a slight angle from — the Comenius and Montesquieu towers, this addition to the complex was planned during the fourth extension to take place at a later date. The 29 storey, 118 m tall tower is the tallest structure in Luxembourg, taking over from the prior record holders, the Palais' complex's Comenius and Montesquieu towers. The Rocca tower is composed of two structures, adjoining and offset, with the shorter structure, having the same profile and height as the Comenius and Montesquieu towers, featuring the same anodized aluminium golden-coloured façade, and the taller structure featuring a contrasting black façade. Its 27th floor features an observation deck, which it is claimed by the CJEU, is the only one of its kind on Earth offering a view of four countries; Belgium, France, Germany and Luxembourg.

The Rocca tower takes its name from Giustina Rocca, an Italian Renaissance figure considered to be the first female lawyer in history.

As seen from an entrance to the Jardin du Multilinguisme. From left to right, the Rocca, Montesquieu, and Comenius towers and the Anneau building.

=== Grounds ===
Following the completion of the Palais complex's fourth extension, and during renovation works on the Annexes circa 2013, construction efforts were undertaken to ensure that the complex could be still be accessed via rue du Fort Niedergrünewald, which had been raised to the level of Avenue John F. Kennedy, as part of general urban redevelopment plans for Kirchberg. This included removing a footbridge to the upper storey of the Palais' Erasmus building, which had previously spanned the road.

Work was completed in 2023 on installing a new perimeter fence, including three new secure visitors checkpoints, on rue du Fort Niedergrünewald, boulevard Konrad Adenauer, and the rerouted rue Charles-Léon Hammes. On Europe Day 2023, a "multilingualism garden", open to the public, using some of the land adjacent to the complex left derelict following the demolition of the European Commission's original Jean Monnet building, was inaugurated.

== Representations ==
In January 2025, it was announced that the Palais would feature on one of two sets of replacement designs for euro banknotes being considered by the governing council of the European Central Bank. If selected in 2026, the building complex will appear on the reverse of the 50 euro note.

== Bibliography ==
- Hein, Carola (2004). The Capital of Europe: Architecture and Urban Planning for the European Union. Greenwood Publishing Group. ISBN 978-0-275-97874-7.
- Court of Justice of the European Union. (March 2020). Court of Justice of the European Union: ensuring the protection of EU law (PDF). Luxembourg: Court of Justice of the European Union / Communications Directorate / Electronic Publications and Media Unit. doi:10.2862/815100. ISBN 978-92-829-3257-5.
