= Radio 1212 =

American black propaganda radio station in World War II

Radio 1212 or Sender 11212 or Nachtsender 1212 was a black propaganda radio station operated from 1944 to 1945 by the Psychological Warfare Branch of the 12th Army Group (PWB/12 AG) of the Supreme Headquarters Allied Expeditionary Force (SHAEF). The PWB/12 AG was composed of members of the military, the Office of Strategic Services, civilians from the Office of War Information and the British propaganda agency, the Political Warfare Executive. Nachtsender 1212 broadcast from the Grand Duchy of Luxembourg using the former commercial radio facilities known as Radio Luxembourg, which had been occupied and then liberated from German control during World War II. The clandestine station operated during the hours when the Voice of SHAEF, the aboveground station of PWB/12 AG, was off the air. The Voice of SHAEF operations were overseen by William Harlan Hale of the Office of War Information, who was appointed head of the station by General Robert A. McClure.

== History of the station ==
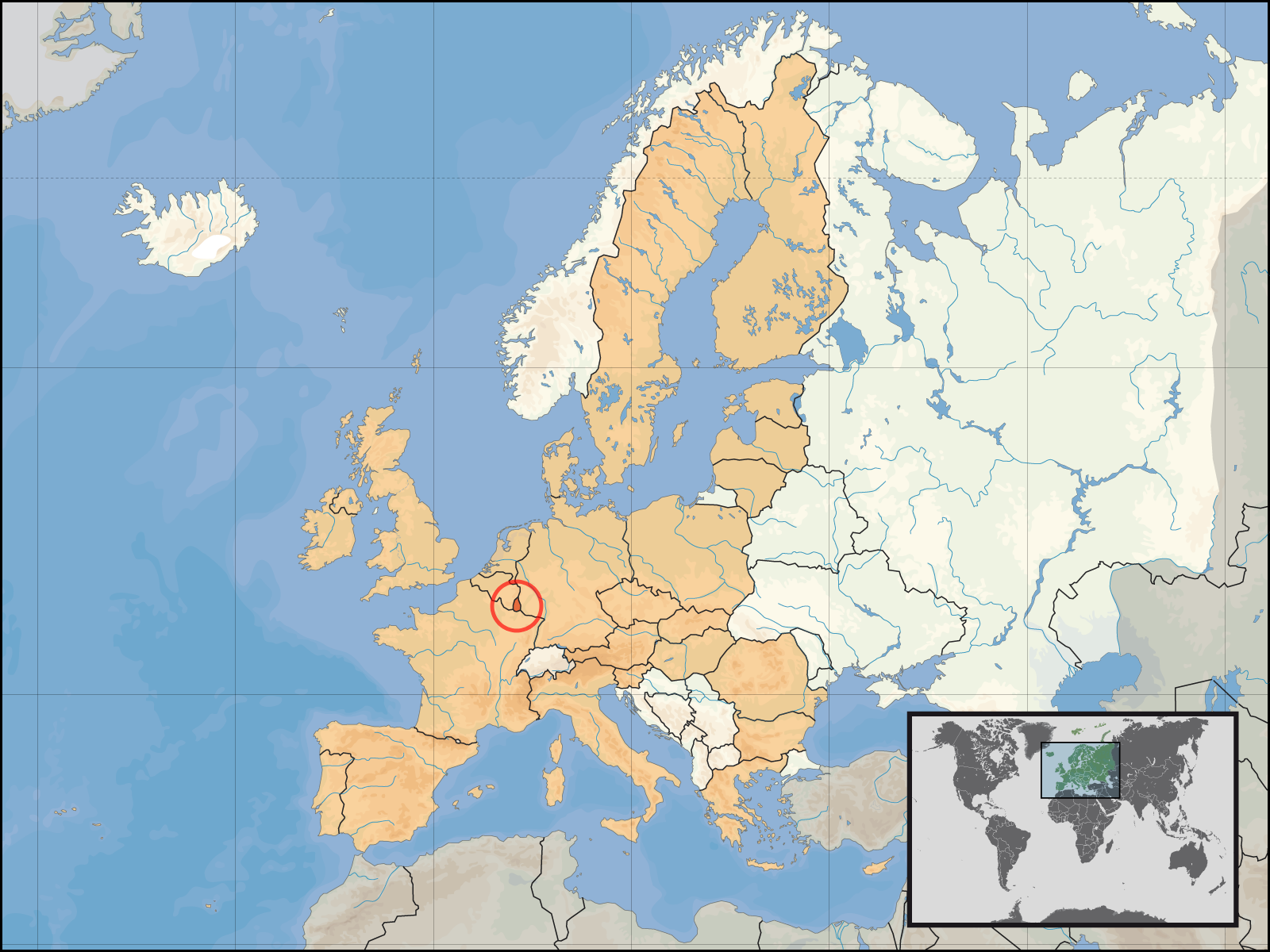
Location of the Grand Duchy of Luxembourg (shown in red circle), home of the Radio Luxembourg transmitters, illustrating its relationship to listeners on the continent of Europe and within the British Isles

Radio Luxembourg, a commercial, English-language station that broadcast to the United Kingdom, closed down on September 21, 1939, on the instructions of the government of the Grand Duchy to protect the neutrality of Luxembourg during World War II.

=== Era of "Lord Haw-Haw" ===
On May 10, 1940, the Nazi government of Germany ordered the occupation of Luxembourg, and the Wehrmacht turned over the facilities of Radio Luxembourg to Großdeutscher Rundfunk. The Nazis also used the station to reach the British Isles. It featured the Irish presenter William Joyce, whose propaganda broadcasts became dubbed by disbelieving listeners in the UK as the stilted voice of "Lord Haw-Haw".

=== Era of PWB/ 12 AG ===
On May 24, 1944, the Luxembourg government in exile in Washington, D.C., agreed that, following the liberation of the Grand Duchy, they would turn over the facilities of Radio Luxembourg to U.S. Army control. More specifically, this control would be given to SHAEF where the station would serve as the "Voice of the Supreme Headquarters Allied Expeditionary Force" acting on behalf of America, Britain, France, Belgium and Luxembourg.

On September 10, 1944, the German armies fled Luxembourg following the Allied invasion on D-Day and the approach of a special task force of the American 12th Army. The Luxembourg transmitters were then turned over to SHAEF.

During the withdrawal some German soldiers had been ordered to dynamite the station, but a station engineer persuaded them to shoot holes in the transmitter tubes instead. When the US troops arrived, the engineer dug up a set of spare tubes which he had buried in the grounds of the station four years earlier.

The facilities of Radio Luxemburg were overseen by the Psychological Warfare Branch of SHAEF. The Office of War Information (OWI) was charged with overseeing the aboveground broadcasts of the "Voice of SHAEF." At night, the PWB/12 AG used the facility to operate Nachtsender 1212, a black propaganda station that identified itself as broadcasting from within Nazi Germany, named for the frequency on which it broadcast - 1212 meters.

The purpose of Nachtsender 1212 was to gain a loyal Nazi audience by broadcasting information favourable to the German interpretation of the War, but as the battle advanced against the borders of Germany itself, Nachtsender 1212 began to intersperse misleading and totally false information within its broadcasts. This included a fictitious story about a German city that rebelled against the Nazi regime, pretending to relay messages from the burgomaster asking for help. The station had a similar mission to the British-operated Soldatensender Calais, which attempted to undermine German military morale and provide misinformation under the cover of entertaining Germans. Nachtsender 1212 signed off the air by pretending that the Allies had captured this make-believe German station by overrunning it.

=== Era of transition ===
Following the occupation of Germany in May 1945, the future of Radio Luxembourg was debated in the United Kingdom. The BBC did not welcome the idea of renewed commercial competition if the facilities were turned back to commercial control. In conjunction with Winston Churchill, a plan was devised to redirect the station towards communist Eastern Europe and the Soviet Union by linking the Luxembourg transmitters via landline to BBC World Service studios in London. This plan fell apart when Churchill's Conservative Party lost to the Labour Party in the postwar British General Election on July 5, 1945.

For a time the Luxembourg transmitters remained under American control. The station provided content to Allied occupation-run broadcasters in Germany such as Radio Munich. The transmitters were used both to relay programs for the Voice of America and originating programming under the call sign identifier of the "United Nations Station".

PWD's four hours of staid German-language broadcasts daily found competing with Berliner Rundfunk difficult; the Soviet counterpart broadcast 19 hours of several genres including music. Radio Luxembourg was handed back to the Grand Duchy on 11 November 1945.

== See also ==
- German People's Radio
- Radio Luxembourg, or "208, your station of the stars" - 1951–1992.
- Radio Luxembourg (disambiguation)

== Sources ==
- Hitler's Irish Voices: The Story of German Radio's Wartime Irish Service David O'Donoghue ISBN 1-900960-04-4
