= Barry Alldis =

Australian presenter on British radio (1930–1982)

- Alldis at the Radio Luxembourg microphone in the 1960s
- Born: 5 December 1930; Newcastle, New South Wales, Australia
- Died: 21 November 1982 (aged 51)
- Education: University of Sydney
- Occupation: Radio presenter
- Employer: Radio 2TM Tamworth • 4BH • Radio Luxembourg • BBC

Barry Alldis (5 December 1930 – 21 November 1982) was an Australian presenter on British radio, most notably on the English service of Radio Luxembourg. Alldis' contribution to UK radio is commemorated in the Radio Academy's Hall of Fame.

== Broadcasting career ==
Barry Alldis, born in Newcastle, New South Wales, Australia, gained a music scholarship at Sydney University, becoming an accomplished pianist and trumpeter. He soon became involved in local radio, first as an announcer on Radio 2TM Tamworth and then as a disc-jockey on station 4BH in Brisbane. Alldis moved to London in 1955, first taking a series of odd jobs including that of nightclub pianist.

In 1956 he became one of the small team of "resident announcers" at Radio Luxembourg's studios in Luxembourg City, broadcasting primarily to Britain and Ireland, although the station, boasting one of the most powerful transmitters in the world, was also heard across Western Europe.

Radio Luxembourg's resident English team had to cover all the continuity announcing—of which there was a lot, since many of the sponsored programmes (pre-recorded in London, though this was never explained to the listeners) lasted only 15 minutes—as well as presenting several hours of live programmes per day themselves, largely based on playing records of popular music to fill up all the time not sold as sponsored programming, in practice usually the early evening plus the late evening through to the small hours of the morning. Alldis acquired the knack of somehow always sounding enthusiastic both about all the products he was required to "plug" in the spot commercials and about the record requests from listeners flooding into the station every day.

Quickly promoted to Chief Announcer, he stayed in Luxembourg (where he married a local girl) for 10 years, and built up a considerable following throughout Europe: for many listeners in that era, Alldis was Radio Luxembourg.

In 1966 he moved to London to work as a freelance disc-jockey and newsreader/continuity announcer, initially mostly for the BBC Light Programme and, after their launch in September 1967, for both the pop music station BBC Radio 1 and the "middle-of-the-road" station BBC Radio 2. (In fact the distinction between the two outputs was blurred for the first several years because they were merged for substantial periods of each day including for Alldis' Thursday edition of Late Night Extra.)

In 1975 Alldis went back to Luxembourg and returned to the radio station where he had made his name. He quickly became one of the radio station's biggest audience draws once again, returning to Sunday evenings with the Top 20. He remained on air until his death in 1982 at the age of 51.

== Programmes ==
Alldis presented many popular music programmes. He was best known for the weekly Top Twenty Show on Radio Luxembourg, which he anchored from 1958 until 1966.

At the BBC he hosted numerous disc-based shows at different periods, including Monday, Monday, Newly Pressed, Swingalong, Late Night Extra, Album Time and The Early Show.

== Catchphrases ==
- "Your DJ, B.A."
- "Whether at home or on the highway, thanks for tuning my way"

== Other achievements ==
- Alldis was an occasional contributor to the weekly London paper New Musical Express. He also wrote popular songs, some of which were performed on the BBC.
- On a couple of occasions in 1961/62 he was the "Guest DJ" on ABC TV's Thank Your Lucky Stars.
- He acted a role as "The compere" of a music concert—more or less playing himself—in Pinewood Studios' film thriller Blind Corner (1963).
