= Beidweiler Longwave Transmitter =

Coordinates: 49.73033°N 6.32058°E

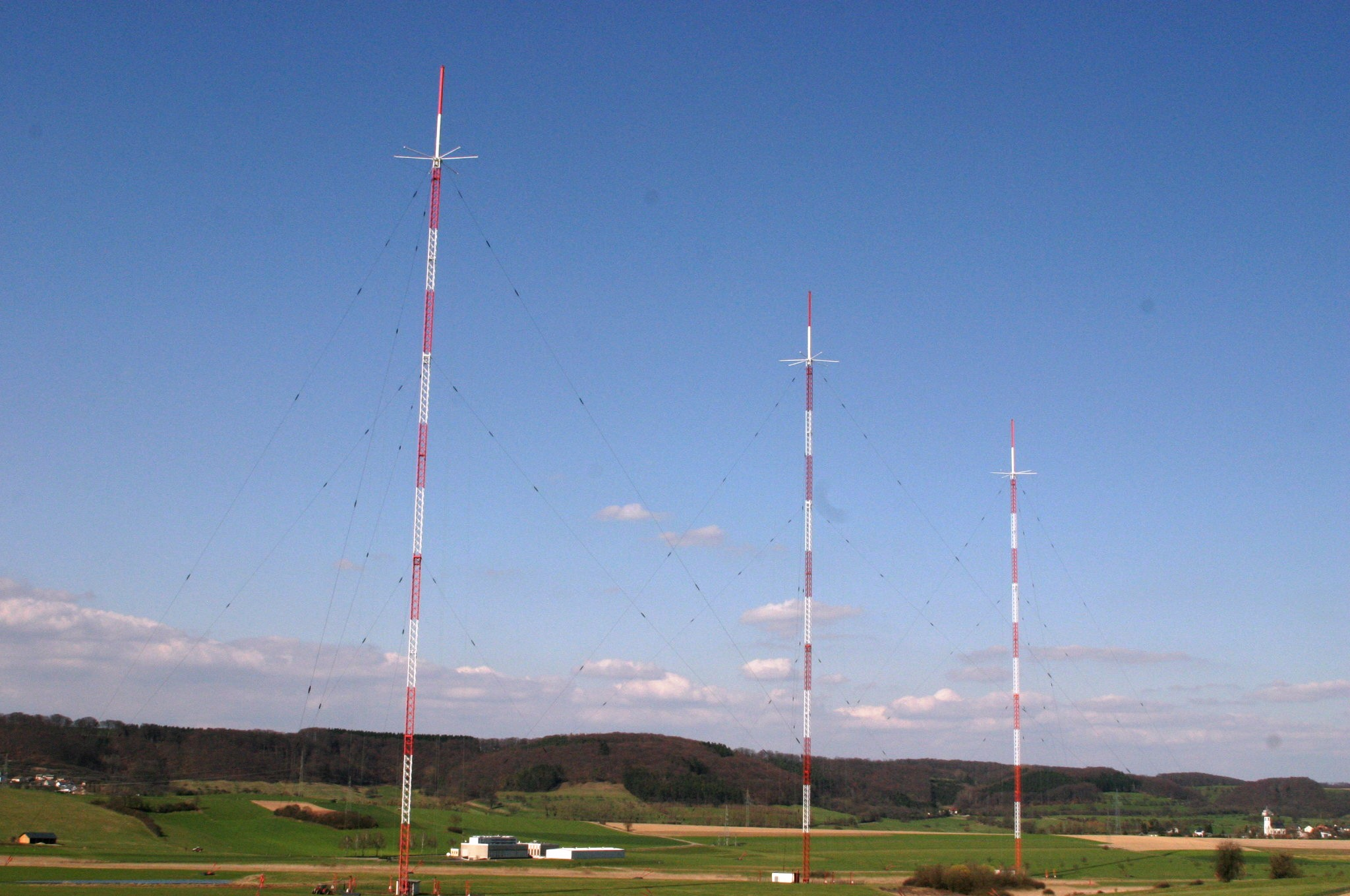
Masts of Beidweiler longwave transmitter (2006)

The Beidweiler longwave transmitter was a high-power broadcasting transmission site owned by RTL Group and operated by RTL company Broadcasting Center Europe. It was used to transmit the French-speaking programme of RTL on longwave frequency 234 kHz until 1 January 2023. Based in Beidweiler, Luxembourg, the transmission site was situated at 49°43'58" N and 6°19'08" E and went into service in 1972 as replacement of the old Junglinster Longwave Transmitter. Junglinster remained in use as a backup site and for additional broadcast services. It was demolished on 6 November 2026.

== Construction ==
The facility used a directional antenna consisting of three 290-meter (950 ft) tall guyed masts, each equipped with a cage antenna. The output of this array was mostly directed toward Paris. When the site was inaugurated in 1972 it operated with a transmission power of 1400 kilowatts, which was pushed up to 2000 kW in 1974, making it one of the most powerful broadcasting stations in the world at the time.

== History ==
In 1994, the facility's transmitters were replaced with Thomson-Csf TRE 2175 units, which in turn were replaced by a new Transradio TRAM/P 1500 LS solid-state transmitter in 2011 that could support DRM digital radio broadcasting. The maximum power of the site is 1500 kW (reduced to 1000 kW at night); since 2020, the output power has been set to 750 kW daytime or 375 kW at night.

In 2019, RTL Group and Luxembourgish energy company Enovos began work on an extensive solar generation facility at Beidweiler. The first phase of the project, consisting of 16,100 photovoltaic solar panels, was connected to the national energy grid in 2020. A second group of panels went online in 2021. Together with a similar solar generation facility at Junglinster, the transmission sites make up the largest solar facility in Luxembourg, generating almost 10.5 gigawatt-hours of energy per year.

In October 2022, RTL parent company Groupe M6 announced plans to cease broadcasting from the site, citing the need to reduce electricity consumption. Transmissions from Beidweiler stopped on 2 January 2023, with listeners advised to switch to FM, DAB+, or streams delivered via digital TV and mobile apps. All three masts were demolished in a controlled explosion on 6 November 2026 at 3:00 pm.

== See also ==
- List of tallest structures in Luxembourg
- List of famous transmission sites
