= Marnach transmitter =

Coordinates: 50°02′35″N 6°05′02″E

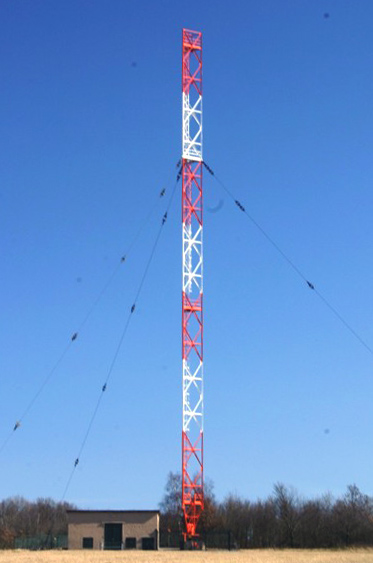
60-metre (200') mast of Marnach transmitter used for nighttime transmissions

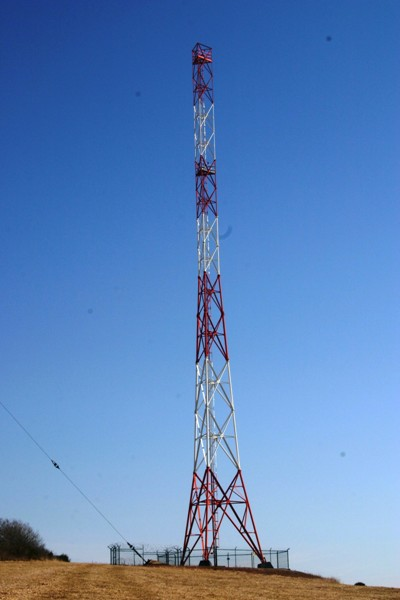
65-metre (210') tall reflector tower of Marnach transmitter close to the 60-metre (200') mast used for night-time transmissions

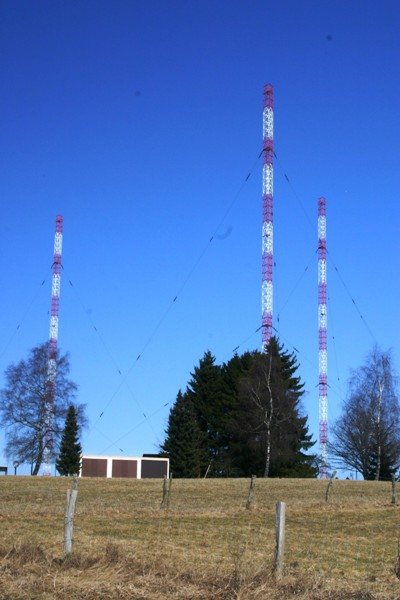
the three 105-metre (350') tall masts of the day antenna of the Marnach transmitter

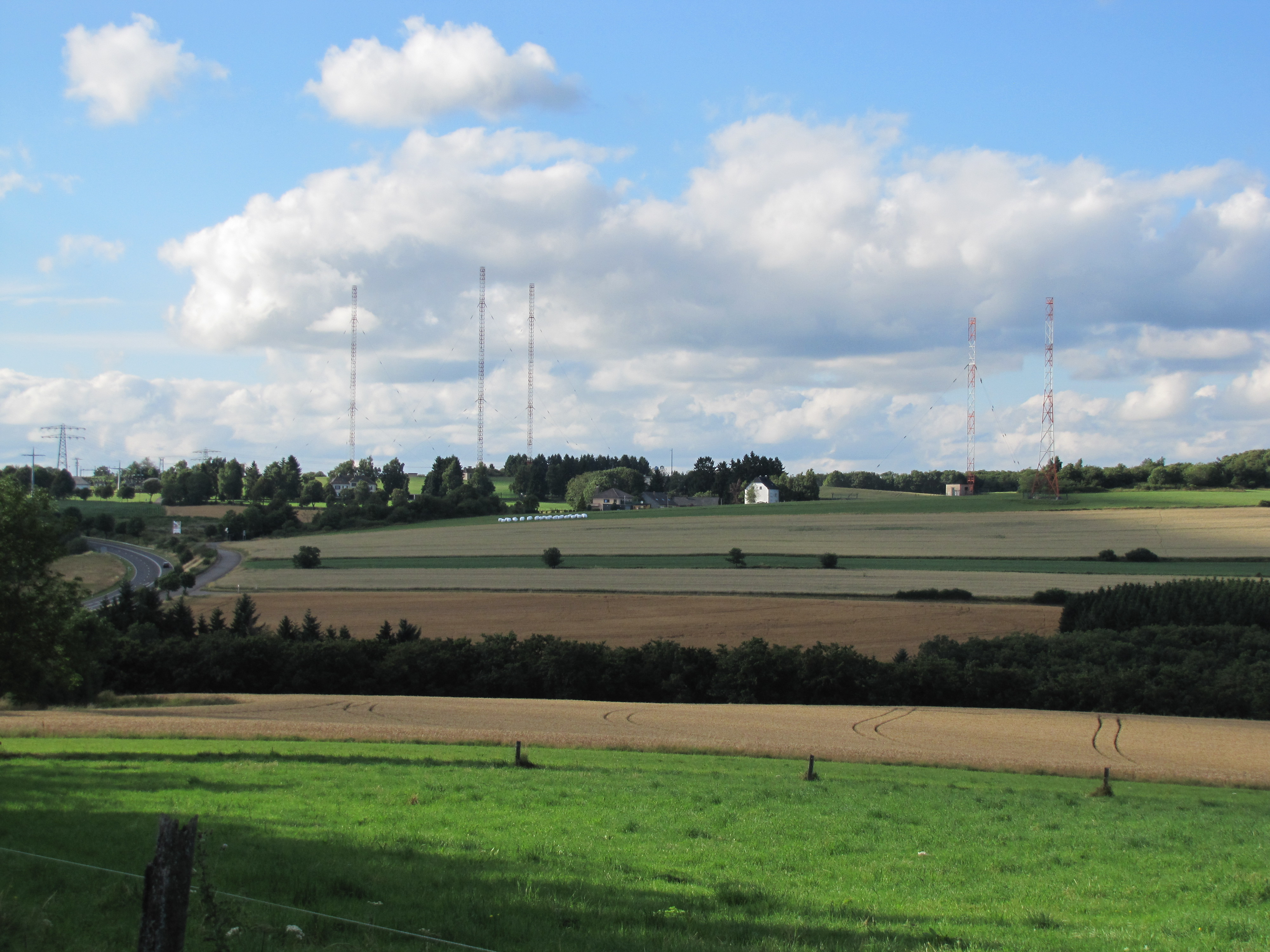
Marnach transmitter, overall view

Marnach transmitter was a broadcasting facility of RTL near Marnach in the commune of Clervaux, in northern Luxembourg. The Marnach transmitter was built in 1955 for improving the transmission of the English-speaking program on 1439 kHz (later 1440 kHz), which was transmitted from 1951 with an omnidirectional antenna from Junglinster, to the British Isles and for a better transmission on this frequency to Germany at daytime. Therefore, it was given a directional antenna with a switchable directional characteristic pointing north-northeast towards the Rhine-Ruhr area, Germany's most populated area, and west-northwest in the direction of the UK. This antenna was implemented in form of a directional antenna consisting of three ground-fed 105-meter-tall (344-foot) guyed mast antennas arranged in the form of an isosceles triangle with a 90-degree angle. As transmitters, two 100 kW units switched in parallel were used when it went in service in December 1955.

== Overview ==
In 1956 the transmission power of the Marnach mediumwave transmitter, which worked until 1978 on 1439 kHz, was increased to 350 kW after the mediumwave transmitter of Junglinster was moved to Marnach. On 15 July 1957 the German-speaking program, which rapidly became very popular, started. In April 1958 the regular program service started, which was a German programme in the daytime and the famous English program "2-0-8" in the evening and nighttime.

In 1962 an FM transmitter was also installed at the site of Marnach transmitter. For this transmitter, a further mast was built. In 1965 the transmission power of the mediumwave transmitter was increased to 600 kW and in 1968 to 1200 kW, resulting in Marnach mediumwave transmitter becoming the most powerful privately owned mediumwave transmitter in the world at that time.

On 17 January 1969 the FM transmission mast of the station collapsed and damaged the transmitter building. For the FM transmitters, which were planned to move in 1970 to the newly built Hosingen FM and TV mast, a temporary antenna was installed, which was dismantled after the Hosingen transmitter went in service.

In 1969 a 60-metre (200') tall guyed ground-fed antenna mast was built, which, with its stronger skywave, allowed better signals to the British Isles at night as the prevailing directional antenna. This antenna however was expanded in the 1970s to a system consisting of five 105-metre (350') tall guyed masts. Nevertheless, it did not work as desired and later it was rebuilt again to the former three-mast antenna. The 60-metre (200') mast used for night transmissions was given a reflector in form of a free-standing 65-metre (210') tall lattice tower with triangular cross section in 1976 for beaming the transmitted power to the British Isles at night.

In November 1978, the Marnach transmitter shifted its frequency slightly to 1440 kHz. This was in compliance with the European Broadcasting Union's new frequency plan, under which all mediumwave and longwave frequencies would become exact multiples of 9 kHz.

On 30 December 1991 the transmission of the English-speaking program of Radio Luxemburg was cancelled, while the transmitter remained in use for the German program "RTL Oldie Radio". Later the transmitter was often hired for other program suppliers. One of these suppliers was the Chinese foreign broadcasting service, which used it for transmitting programmes in foreign languages in the evening and the German pop music radio MEGARADIO, which used it in 2002/03 in the daytime. In spring 2004 Marnach mediumwave transmitter worked first time in DRM-mode. At the beginning of 2005 it started regular DRM transmissions in the daytime while at night the transmitter is still operated in the old AM mode as there are not many radios available which can demodulate programmes in DRM mode.

== Closure ==
CLT-UFA had agreed to cease transmission from the Marnach transmitter within three years of October 2011 (i.e. by 2014) due to concerns from the local community. No replacement site is planned. This was deferred by one further year and the transmitter closed on 31 December 2015 at the same time as the closure of the remaining medium wave transmitters in Germany. On 11 February 2016, the 1440 kHz Marnach masts were demolished.

== See also ==
- Radio Luxembourg
