= Junglinster Longwave Transmitter =

Coordinates: 49°43′6.7″N 6°15′39.0″E

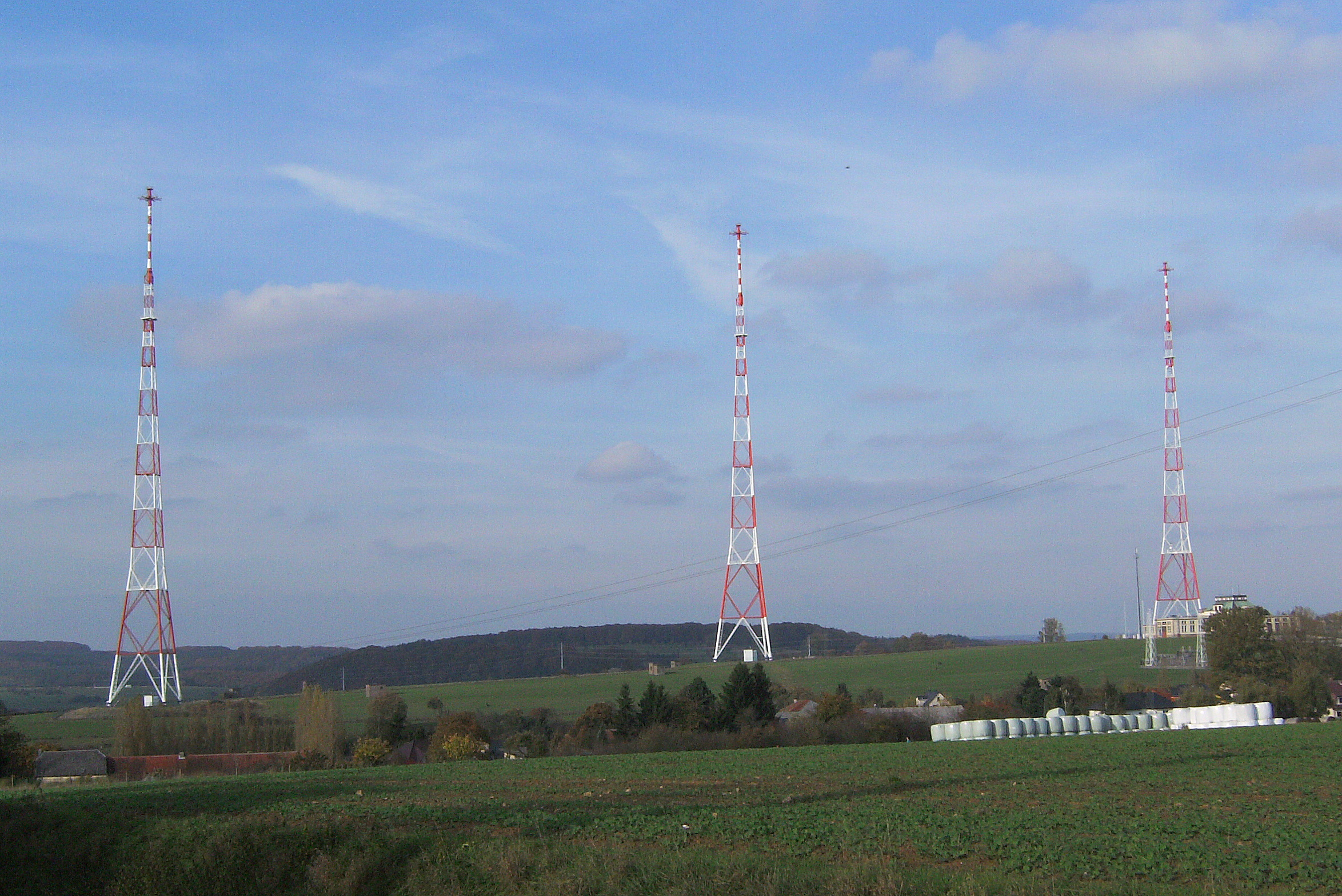
The three longwave transmission towers of Junglinster transmitter

The Junglinster Longwave Transmitter is a longwave broadcasting facility used by RTL near Junglinster, Luxembourg, which went into service in 1932. Its aerial consists of three free-standing steel-framework towers, which are ground fed radiators. These towers formed a directional aerial for the frequency 234 kHz and until 1980 were 250 metres high. Since 1983 their height has been 215 metres.

Junglinster longwave transmitter was at time of inauguration one of the most powerful transmitters in the world. It was discovered that its signal can under some conditions show cross modulation with other radio stations by ionospheric reflection. This phenomenon was named "Luxembourg effect" after the circumstance that it was first detected at the signal of this transmitter in Luxembourg.

After the inauguration of the Beidweiler longwave transmitter the Junglinster longwave transmitter served as a spare, until being definitively discontinued in 2023. The three towers are due to be demolished through controlled explosion by the end of 2026.

Also at the site of Junglinster Longwave Transmitter are the shortwave transmitters of RTL, at the frequencies 6090 kHz and 15350 kHz were used. Transmitting on 6090 kHz, it is of special interest as it was (until the 80s) one of the best known radio stations in Germany and several radio sets had a special switch for its reception, the so-called "Luxembourg"-switch. Today this transmitter works in DRM mode.

From 1951 on, the site of the Junglinster Longwave Transmitter was also the mediumwave transmitter. It moved to Marnach in 1955.

== Brief history ==
Year	Longwave	Mediumwave	Shortwave	FM	Changes
1932	150 kW	-	-	-	Built of longwave transmitter with a transmitter of Chireix
1938	-	-	6 kW	-	First shortwave transmissions
1951	250 kW	-	-	-	Upgrade of longwave transmitter
1952	-	150 kW	-	-	First mediumwave transmissions
1953	-	-	50 kW	-	Second shortwave transmitter went in service
1954	500 kW	-	-	-	Installation of second longwave transmitter
1954	-	-	-	-	Built of second antenna tower (height: 250 metres)
1955	-	0	-	-	Mediumwave transmission moved to Marnach transmitter
1959	-	-	-	12 kW	First FM-transmitter went in service on 92.5 MHz
1959	-	-	-	-	Built of third 250-metre tower
1960	750 kW	-	-	-	Inauguration of third longwave transmitter
1964	1000 kW	-	-	-	Replacement of first longwave transmitter by new 600 kW unit
1970	-	-	250 kW	-	Installation of new shortwave transmitter, built by Telefunken. The two old shortwave transmitters were kept as spare units
1971	-	-	500	-	Installation of a second shortwave transmitter
1971	-	-	-	0	FM-transmissions moved to FM- and TV-mast Hosingen
1973	-	-	500 + 50	-	The old 50 kW shortwave transmitter went in service for broadcasting on 15350 kHz
1976	-	-	500 + 10	-	Replacement of old 50 kW transmitter by a new 10 kW unit
1983	-	-	-	-	The height of the towers is reduced from 250 metres to 216 metres
1987	1200 kW	-	-	-	Replacement of the 600 kW longwave transmitter from 1954 by a new 1200 kW transmitter from Thomson

== See also ==
- Lattice tower
- List of famous transmission sites
