= FM- and TV-mast Hosingen =

Coordinates: 50.02067°N 6.10448°E

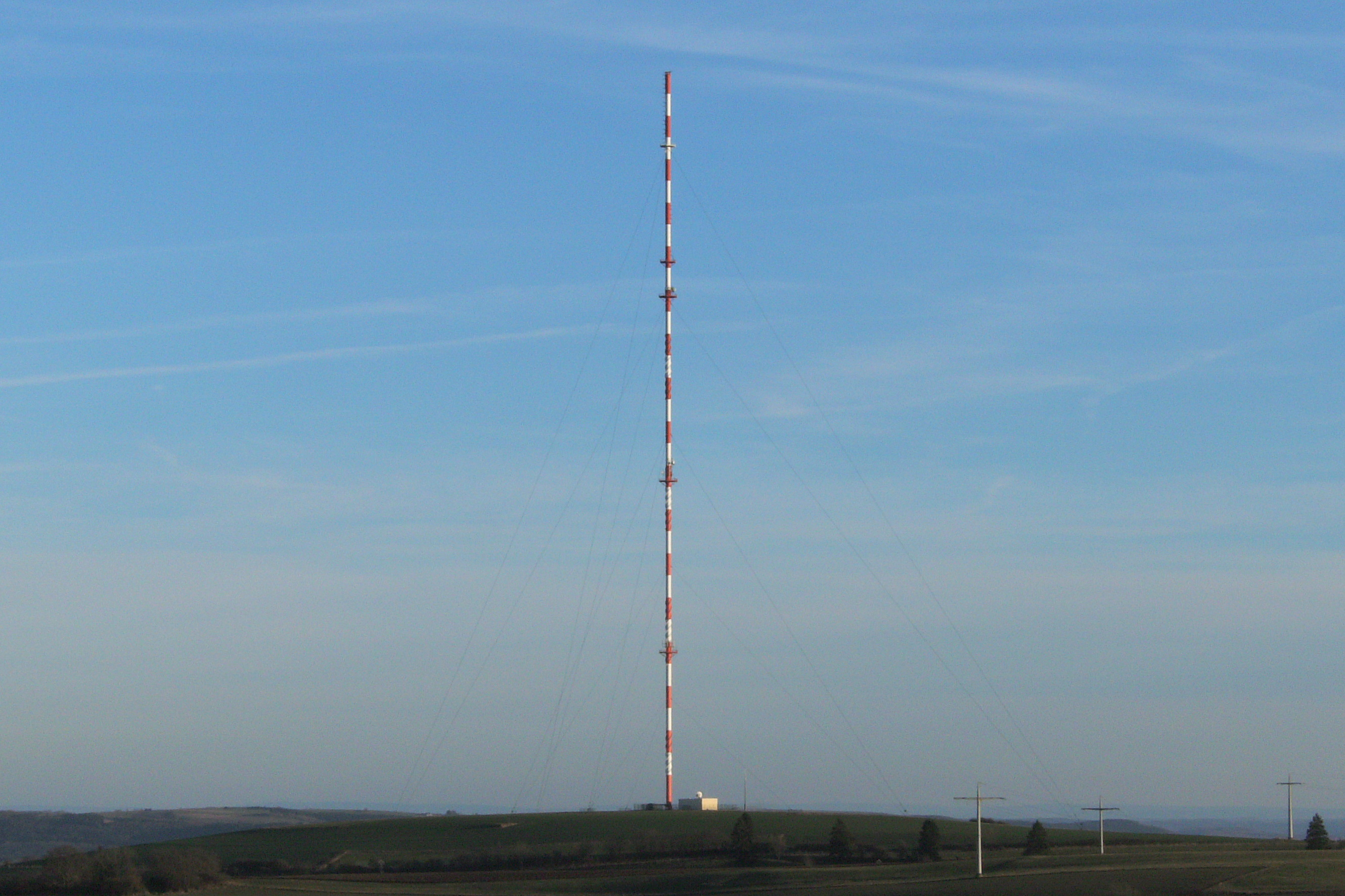
FM- and TV-mast Hosingen, the tallest structure of Luxembourg

The FM- and TV mast Hosingen is a 300-metre (980 ft) high guyed radio mast outside the town of Hosingen, Luxembourg used for FM and TV broadcasting. It has a diameter of 2 metres (6.6 ft) and was built in 1970. The FM- and TV-mast Hosingen is the tallest construction in Luxembourg and property of RTL.

== Construction ==
The FM- and TV-mast Hosingen carries antennas at a height of 285 metres (935 ft), pointed toward Germany. These antennas are used for transmitting the German-speaking program of RTL on 97,0 MHz with an ERP of 100 kW. The antennas for the transmission of the native radio station on 92,5 MHz with an ERP of 50 kW are mounted at a height of 237 metres (778 ft). As transmission device for both frequencies, Telefunken S 3217 transmitters with an output power of 10 kW is used. For each frequency there is also a backup transmitter installed, with an output power of 10 kW, a Telefunken S 3152.

== See also ==
- List of masts
